= List of computer-animated television series =

This is a list of released animated television series made mainly with computer animation.

== 1990s ==
Title	Season(s)	Episodes	Production	Country(ies)	Original Broadcast	Channel/network
Amazing Animals	4	54	Dorling Kindersley Vision; Partridge Films	United Kingdom	1996–99	Disney Channel
Beast Machines: Transformers	2	26	Mainframe Entertainment; Hasbro	Canada; United States	1999–2000	Fox Kids; YTV; Tokyo MX (Japan)
Beast Wars: Transformers	3	52	Alliance Communications (seasons 1–2); Alliance Atlantis Communications (season 3); Mainframe Entertainment; BLT Productions Ltd. Claster Television Incorporated	Canada; United States; Japan	1996–99	Syndication; YTV; TXN (TV Tokyo)
Cartoon Sushi	1	15	a.k.a. Cartoon; DNA Productions; MTV Animation	United States; Canada	1997–98	MTV; Teletoon at Night
Cita's World				United States	1999–2003	BET
Donkey Kong Country	2	40	Nelvana Limited; Medialab Studio L. A. (season 1); Hong Guang Animation (CGCG) (season 2); WIC Entertainment Ltd.	Canada; France (season 1); China (season 2)	1997–2000	Teletoon; France 2 Canal+
Les Fables Géométriques	5	50	Fantôme Animation	France	1990-92	Canal+
Fabulicious Day	1	13	Chariot Media; Cook Communications; Kids Everywhere Productions; Big Idea Productions	Canada	1996	Family Channel
Gregory Horror Show	4	88	Milky Cartoon	Japan	1999–2001	TV Asahi
Insektors	2	26	Fantome Animation; Ellipse Programme; Medialab Studio D.A. Neurones; Erasmus+ Creative Europe Media	France	1994–95	Canal+ France 3 RTBF 1
Jay Jay the Jet Plane	4	62	PorchLight Entertainment; Modern Cartoons; Wonderwings.com Entertainment; Knightscove Family Films	United States	1998–2005	TLC (seasons 1–2); PBS (season 3)
Jellabies	10	95	Optical Image Broadcast; Winchester Entertainment	Australia; United Kingdom	1998–2001	ABC Kids; GMTV
Lavender Castle	2	26	Cosgrove Hall Films; Carrington Productions International	United Kingdom	1999–2000	ITV (CITV)
A Little Curious	2	43	Curious Pictures	United States	1999–2000	HBO
Monster by Mistake	3	51	Catapult Productions; Cambium Entertainment (seasons 1–2); CCI Entertainment (season 3)	Canada	1999–2003	YTV; VRAK.TV (season 3)
The Moxy Show	2	24	Colossal Pictures; Turner Studios	United States	1993–95	Cartoon Network
Napo	1		Via Storia	France; Sweden; Germany; United Kingdom	1998–present	Direct-to-video; YouTube
Prince of Atlantis	1	26	BBC Worldwide; Ravensburger Film + TV; Videal	United Kingdom	1997	BBC1; BBC2
Quarxs	1	12	Canal+	France	1990–93	
Rayman: The Animated Series	1	4	Ubisoft	Canada; France; United States	1999–2000	
ReBoot	4	48	Mainframe Entertainment; BLT Productions; Alliance Communications (seasons 1–3); Shaw Communications (season 3); Alliance Atlantis; Meridian Broadcasting (seasons 1–3)	Canada	1994–2001	YTV
Rolie Polie Olie	6	78	Nelvana; Métal Hurlant Productions (seasons 1–5); Sparx* (seasons 1–5); Sparkling Animation (season 6)	France; Canada	1998–2004	CBC Television; La Cinquième/France 5 Playhouse Disney (United States)
Roughnecks: Starship Troopers Chronicles	1	40	Verhoeven-Marshall; Adelaide Productions; Columbia TriStar Television	United States	1999–2000	Syndication (Bohbot Kids Network)
Shadow Raiders	2	26	Mainframe Entertainment; Alliance Atlantis	Canada	1998–99	YTV
Toy Story Treats	1	54	Pixar Animation Studios	United States	1996	ABC
Transformers: Generation 2	1	52	Takara Tomy/Hasbro	United States	1992–94	
Van-Pires	1	13	Abrams/Gentile Entertainment; MSH Entertainment Corporation	United States	1997	First-run Syndication
Vartmaan	1	26	Climb Media	India	1994–95	DD National
VeggieTales	3	50	Big Idea Productions	United States	1993–2015	Direct-to-video
Voltron: The Third Dimension	2	26	Netter Digital Entertainment; Mike Young Productions; The Summit Media Group; World Events Productions	United States	1998–2000	First-run syndication
Weird-Oh's	1	13	Decode Entertainment; EM.TV & Merchandising AG; Mainframe Entertainment; Testor Corporation	Canada; United States; Germany	1999–2000	YTV; Fox Family Channel

== 2000s ==
Title	Season(s)	Episodes	Production	Country(ies)	Original Broadcast	Channel/network
3-2-1 Penguins!	3	27	Big Idea Entertainment	United States	2000–08	Direct-to-video (2000–03); Qubo (2007–08)
Action Man (2000)	2	26	Mainframe Studios; Saban Entertainment	Canada; United States	2000–01	Fox Kids; YTV
The Adventures of Hello Kitty & Friends		52	Sanrio Digital	Hong Kong; Japan; United States	2008	TVB Jade
The Adventures of Jimmy Neutron, Boy Genius	3	64	O Entertainment; DNA Productions; Nickelodeon Animation Studio	United States	2002–06	Nickelodeon
Alien Racers	1	26	MGA Entertainment; SD Entertainment; BLT Productions, LTD	Canada; United States	2005–06	Fox
Angelina Ballerina: The Next Steps	4	40	HIT Entertainment; WNET New York	United Kingdom; United States	2009–10	Nick Jr. PBS Kids
Angus & Cheryl	1	104	Tuba Entertainment; BRB Internacional; Screen 21; Televisió de Catalunya	Spain; South Korea	2006	AnimaKids
Animal Mechanicals	3	74	Halifax Film	Canada	2008–11	CBC Television
Animalia	2	40	Burberry Productions; Animalia Productions; PorchLight Entertainment	Australia; United States	2007–08	Network Ten; PBS Kids Go!
Ape Escape	1	76	Shogakukan Music & Digital Entertainment; Sony Computer Entertainment	Japan	2002	TXN
Auto-B-Good	2	63	Wet Cement Productions; GoldKing Media	United States	2005–06	Syndication
Baby Faith		6	Integrity Publishers; FamilyTreeMedia	United States	2004–06	Direct-to-video
Back at the Barnyard	2	52	Omation Animation Studio; Nickelodeon Animation Studio	United States	2007–11	Nickelodeon (2007–10); Nicktoons (2011)
The Backyardigans	4	80	Nelvana Limited; Nickelodeon Animation Studio	United States; Canada	2004–13	Nickelodeon; Treehouse TV
Ben & Izzy	1	13	Rubicon Group Holding	Jordan	2006–08	Cartoon Network Arabic; Majid Kids TV
Bernard	3	156	BRB Internacional; EBS Productions; M6 Métropole Télévision; RG Animation Studios; Screen21; Synergy Media (season 2); SK Broadband (season 3)	South Korea; Spain; France; China	2006–09	EBS; M6; CBBC (United Kingdom); AnimaKids
Bigfoot Presents: Meteor and the Mighty Monster Trucks	1	26	Bigfoot, Inc. RC2 Corporation; Endgame Entertainment; Big Bang Digital Studios; Brandissimo! Inc. CCI Entertainment; Discovery Kids Original Productions	United States; Canada	2006–08	Discovery Kids/TLC; Cartoon Network (Cartoonito) (United Kingdom)
Bo on the Go!	3	55	Halifax Film	Canada	2007–09	CBC Television
Boblins	1	78		United Kingdom	2006–08	Treehouse TV; DR1; TVNZ; ABC2; TiJi; CITV; TV2; TV4; MTV3; Canal Panda; RTVS
Boo!	2	104	Tell-Tale Productions; British Broadcasting Corporation; Universal Cartoon Studios	United Kingdom	2003–06	CBeebies
BOZ the Bear		16	Reel FX Animation; Exclaim Entertainment	United States	2005–07	Direct-to-video
Bratz	2	40	Mike Young Productions; MGA Entertainment	United States	2005–08	Fox (4Kids TV)
Bun & Bunee	1	52		South Africa	2009–11	SABC 3
Bunny Maloney	1	52	MoonScoop; Telegael; France Télévisions	France; Ireland	2009	Canal+ Canal+ Family; Game One; Kabillion
Butt-Ugly Martians	1	26	Mike Young Productions; DCDC Limited; Just Entertainment	United States; Hong Kong; United Kingdom	2001–03	CITV
Cars Toons	2	15	Pixar Animation Studios (Mater's Tall Tales); Pixar Canada (Tales from Radiator Springs); Walt Disney Pictures	United States	2008–14	Disney Channel
Casper's Scare School	2	52	MoonScoop; Classic Media; DQ Entertainment	United States; France; India	2009–12	Cartoon Network; TF1
Century Sonny		52		China	2006	CCTV-Children
Chop Socky Chooks	1	26	Aardman Animations; Decode Entertainment; Nickelodeon Animation Studio	United Kingdom; Canada	2007–08	Cartoon Network; Teletoon; Nickelodeon
Chuggington	7	174	Ludorum (series 1–5); Herschend Entertainment Studios (series 6)	United Kingdom; China	2008–21	CBeebies
Code Lyoko	4	97	Antefilms Production (season 1); MoonScoop (seasons 2–4)	France	2003–07	France 3/Canal J Cartoon Network (United States)
Commander Safeguard	1	14	IAL Saatchi & Saatchi	Pakistan	2005–16	Webcast
Cosmic Quantum Ray	1	26	Mike Young Productions; Method Animation; Cosmotoons; Ocean Productions; Europool; Telegael; SK C&C; Independence Creative; Maya Entertainment	United States; Germany; France	2007–08	Animania HD/The Hub
Cubeez	2	104	Cubeez Ltd; Optical Image Broadcast; Cubeedobeedo Ltd; Starsound B.V.	United Kingdom	2000–01	ITV (GMTV)
Cubix	2	26	Daewon Media; 4Kids Productions	South Korea; United States	2001–04	SBS; KBS 2TV
Dan Dare: Pilot of the Future	1	26	The Dan Dare Corporation; Columbia TriStar International Television	United Kingdom; United States	2002	Channel 5
Dinosaur Train	5	100	Infocomm Media Development Authority; Sparky Animation; The Jim Henson Company; FableVision; Snee-Oosh, Inc. (uncredited); Tail Waggin' Productions	United States; Canada; Singapore	2009–21	PBS Kids
Dirtgirlworld	1	52	Meemee Productions; Decode Entertainment	Australia; Canada	2009–11	ABC Kids; CBC; CBeebies (United Kingdom)
Dragon Booster	3	39	Pacific Coast Productions (seasons 1–2); Film Financial & Productions (season 3); ApolloScreen Filmproduktion; Nerd Corps Entertainment; The Story Hat; Alliance Atlantis	Germany; Canada	2004–06	CBC Television
The Drinky Crow Show	1	11	Mirari Films; Williams Street	United States	2008–09	Adult Swim
Elias: The Little Rescue Boat	2	39		Norway	2005–08	
Erky Perky	3	78	CCI Entertainment; Ambience Entertainment; The LaB Sydney	Australia; Canada	2006–09	Seven Network; YTV
Fanboy & Chum Chum	2	52	Frederator Studios; Nickelodeon Animation Studio	United States	2009–14	Nickelodeon (2009–12); Nicktoons (2014)
Farmkids	2	26		Australia	2008	ABC Kids
Father of the Pride	1	15	DreamWorks Animation	United States	2004–05	NBC
Finley the Fire Engine	2	78	Balley Beg Animation Studios; RHI Entertainment; Kickstart Productions	United Kingdom; United States; Canada	2007–12	BBC One; BBC Two; CBeebies
Fireball	4	39	Jinni's Animation Studios; Walt Disney Television International Japan	Japan	2008–20	Tokyo MX (seasons 1–2); Disney Channel (seasons 1–4); Dlife (seasons 2–3)
Fireman Sam (from series 6)	15	309	HIT Entertainment (2003–17); Mattel Television (2017–present)	United Kingdom	2008–present	Cartoonito (series 6–present); Channel 5 (series 8–present)
Fruity Robo	4		Guang Zhou BlueArc Culture Communications Company	China	2009–present	
Funny Pets	2	24		Japan	2006	KBS Kyoto
The Future Is Wild	1	26	Nelvana Limited; IVL Animation; ST Electronics Pte Ltd.	Canada; Singapore; United States	2007–08	Discovery Kids; Teletoon
Galactik Football	3	78	Gaumont-Alphanim; Audi'Art; Welkin (season 1); Hosem (season 1); LuxAnimation (season 1); Supersonic (season 1); Carloon (season 2); Europool (seasons 2–3); Telegael (season 3); DQ Entertainment (season 3)	France; Ireland (season 3)	2006–11	France 2 (seasons 1–2); Gulli (season 3); Jetix (Europe, seasons 1–2); Disney XD (Europe, season 3)
Game Over	1	6	Never Give Up Productions; Venokur Goetsch Venokur; Carsey-Werner Productions; DKP Studios	United States	2004	UPN
The Garfield Show	5	107	Dargaud Media; Paws, Inc.	France; United States	2009–16	France 3 Cartoon Network (2009–12); Boomerang (2015–16)
Genki Genki Non-tan	3	35	Polygon Pictures	Japan	2002–06	Kids Station
Get Ed	1	26	Walt Disney Television Animation	United States; Canada	2005–06	Jetix (Toon Disney); ABC Family
GG Bond	17	1116	Guang Dong Winsing Company Limited	China	2005–present	PAL (2005–11); HDTV 1080i (2011–present)
The Gnoufs	1	52	Method Animation	France	2004	France 3
God Rocks!	1	4	Chelsea Road Productions	Canada	2002-04	Direct-to-video
Guess with Jess	2	52	Entertainment Rights (Earlier Season 1 episodes); Classic Media (Later Season 1 episodes and Season 2); Nelvana	United Kingdom; Canada	2009–10	CBeebies; Treehouse TV
Hairy Scary	1	52	Alphanim; Europool; Shanghai Cartoon Communication Group; Village Productions	France	2008–12	France 3
Handy Manny	3	113	Nelvana Limited	United States; Canada	2006–13	Playhouse Disney (2006–11); Disney Junior (2011–13)
Headcases		8		United Kingdom	2008	ITV
Heavy Gear: The Animated Series	1	40	Dream Pod 9 Paradox Entertainment; Mainframe Entertainment; Adelaide Productions; Columbia TriStar Television	United States; Canada	2001–02	Syndication
Hermie and Friends		15	Tommy Nelson; Glue Works Entertainment	United States	2002–10	Direct-to-video
Higglytown Heroes	3	67	Wild Brain; Happy Nest	United States	2004–08	Playhouse Disney
Hot Wheels Battle Force 5	2	52	Nerd Corps Entertainment; Nelvana Limited; Mattel, Inc.	United States; Canada	2009–11	Teletoon; Cartoon Network
IMP	1	65	Red Kite Animation; Screen 21	United Kingdom; Spain	2006–07	TVC; Channel 4
Iron Kid	1	26	BRB Internacional; Daiwon; Design Storm; Manga Entertainment; Screen 21; Televisión Española	South Korea; Spain	2006	KBS2; TVE2; Clan; RTVE
Iron Man: Armored Adventures	2	52	Method Animation; Marvel Animation; DQ Entertainment; LuxAnimation (season 1); Isle of Man Film (season 1); Genius (season 1); Fabrique D'Images (season 2); Onyx Lux (season 2); France Télévisions (season 2)	France; India; United States; Luxembourg; Isle of Man (season 1)	2009–12	France 2 (season 1); France 4 (season 2); Nicktoons
Jakers! The Adventures of Piggley Winks	3	52	Entara Ltd. Mike Young Productions; Crest Communications	India; United Kingdom; United States	2003–07	PBS Kids; CBBC; CBeebies; RTE Two (Ireland)
Jane and the Dragon	1	26	Nelvana; Wētā Enterprises	Canada; New Zealand	2005–06	YTV
Jibber Jabber	1	26	Northwest Imaging and FX; Jibber Jabber Toons Ltd.	Canada	2007	YTV
Jungle Junction	2	45	Spider Eye Productions	United States; United Kingdom	2009–12	Disney Channel (season 1); Disney Junior (season 2)
Kerwhizz	2	41	BBC; Studio 100	United Kingdom	2008–11	CBeebies
League of Super Evil	3	52	Nerd Corps Entertainment	Canada	2009–12	YTV
Leon	1	52	Studio Hari	France	2009–18	France 5 CBBC; Super RTL
Little Krishna		13	Reliance BIG Entertainment	India	2009	Nickelodeon; Discovery Kids; Sun TV; Pogo
Little Wizard Tao	2	52	G&G Entertainment; Motion Magic Digital Studios	South Korea; China	2009–13	KBS2 (season 1); KBS1 (season 2)
Lucy, the Daughter of the Devil	1	11	Loren Bouchard L.L.C. Fluid Animation; Williams Street	United States	2005–07	Adult Swim
Make Way for Noddy	2	100	Chorion; SD Entertainment	United Kingdom; United States	2002–06	Channel 5/Five; PBS Kids
Masha and the Bear	7	169	Animaccord Animation Studio	Russia	2009–present	Russia-1; Carousel
Master Raindrop	1	26	Flying Bark Productions; EM.Entertainment; Big Communications; Flux Animation Studio; Media Development Authority	Australia; New Zealand; Singapore	2008–09	Seven Network
Max Adventures	12		The Monk Studios (2007–12, 2014–present); Egg Story Studios (2013–14); Unilever	Thailand; United Kingdom	2005–16	
Max Steel (2000)	3	35	Mainframe Entertainment (2001–02) (season 3); Adelaide Productions; Columbia TriStar Domestic Television	United States; Canada (2001–02) (season 3)	2000–02	Kids' WB (2000–01); Cartoon Network (2001–02)
Max Steel Turbo Missions	4	47	Mattel; Sony Pictures Family Entertainment; Mainframe Entertainment	United States; Canada	2008–11	Cartoon Network
Mickey Mouse Clubhouse	4	125	Disney Television Animation	United States	2006–16	Disney Channel (Playhouse Disney/Disney Junior)
Midnight Horror School	1	26	Milky Cartoon	Japan	2003–04	Fuji TV; Animax
Miss BG	2	52	Ellipsanime; Breakthrough Films & Television; Def2shoot; TVOntario	France; Canada (Ontario)	2005–08	France 5 TiJi; TVOntario
Miss Spider's Sunny Patch Friends	3	40	Callaway Arts & Entertainment; AbsoluteDigital Pictures; Nelvana Limited	Canada; United Kingdom	2004–09	Teletoon (series 1–2); Treehouse TV (series 3); Milkshake!
Monk Little Dog	1	52	Kim's Licensing; Timoon Animation; SAMG Animation; Millimages	France; South Korea	2009–10	Canal+ EBS; Cartoon Network
Monster Buster Club	2	52	Marathon Media; Image Entertainment Corporation	France; Canada	2007–09	TF1; YTV; Jetix (Europe)
Mr. Stain	1	14	The Fool	Japan	2003	Kids Station
My Friends Tigger & Pooh	3	63	Walt Disney Television Animation	United States	2007–10	Playhouse Disney
Nina and the Neurons	11	225		United Kingdom (Scotland)	2007–15	CBeebies
New Captain Scarlet	2	26	Anderson Entertainment for Gerry Anderson Productions; The Indestructible Production Company	United Kingdom	2005	ITV
Noah's Park		3	Cook Communications Ministries	United States	2000–01	Direct-to-video
Noonbory and the Super Seven	1	26	Daewon Media; Cookie Jar Entertainment	Canada; South Korea	2009	Knowledge; Access TV; BBC Kids; SCN; EBS
Numberjacks	2	67	Open Mind Productions	United Kingdom	2006–09	CBeebies; BBC Two
Olivia	2	40	Brown Bag Films; Chorion	United Kingdom; United States; Ireland	2009–15	Nickelodeon; Nick Jr. Channel; Channel 5
The Owl	1	54	Studio Hari; TV-Loonland AG; France Télévisions	France; Germany	2006–07	France 3
Ozie Boo!	3	84	Cyber Group Studios; Atiempo (Originally and entirely)	France; Chile (Originally and entirely)	2004–05 (CGS); 2006–07	TVN; Canal 13
Pat & Stan	1	39	Mac Guff Ligne; TV-Loonland AG	France; Germany	2004–10	TF1
Pecola	2	26	Yomiko Advertising; Nelvana; Milky Cartoon (animation)	Japan; Canada	2001–02	Teletoon; TV Tokyo
The Penguins of Madagascar	3	149	DreamWorks Animation; Nickelodeon Animation Studio	United States	2008–15	Nickelodeon (2008–12); Nicktoons (2013–15)
Pet Alien	2	52	Mike Young Productions; Antefilms Production (season 1); Crest Communications (season 1); JadooWorks (season 1); Abú Media (season 1); Telegael Teoranta; KI.KA (season 2); Europool (season 2); MoonScoop (season 2); Télétoon	United States; France; Ireland; India (season 1); Germany (season 2)	2004–07	TF1/Télétoon; Cartoon Network/Animania HD
Le Petit Nicolas		104	Method Animation; Luxanimation; M6 Studios; MG-MMetropole Télévision; DQ Entertainment; ZDF German Television Network; ZDF Enterprise GmbH; Walt Disney Animation Televisión; Disney Channel France	France	2009–11	M6
The Pinky and Perky Show	1	52	Method Films; Picture Production Company; DQ Entertainment	United Kingdom; France	2008	CBBC; France 3
Pixcodelics		65		Brazil	2005	Cartoon Network
Planet Sketch	2	39	Aardman Animations; Decode Entertainment	United Kingdom; Canada	2005–07	CITV; Teletoon
Playboy's Dark Justice		20		United States	2000–01	Playboy TV
Pocoyo	5	321	Zinkia Entertainment (2002–23); Animaj (2023–present); Granada Kids (seasons 1–2); Cosgrove Hall Films (season 1); Koyi Talent (2019–23)	Spain; United Kingdom (seasons 1–2)	2005–present	La 2 (seasons 1–2); La 1 (season 3); CITV (seasons 1–2); Clan TVE (season 4–present); YouTube (season 4; special episodes)
Popee the Performer	1	39	Zuiyo; Nippon Columbia	Japan	2000–01	Kids Station
Pororo the Little Penguin	9	312	Ocon Animation Studios; Iconix Entertainment	South Korea	2003–present	EBS1; Disney Channel; Cartoon Network
Raggs	3	78	ABC Studios, Sydney (2006–09); Blue Socks Media (2009–12); Raggs LLC; Elmulsion Arts; Southern Star International; KQED San Francisco	Australia; United States	2006-09	Seven Network; PBS member stations/Qubo
Ribbits!		3	Focus on the Family; Zonderkidz; Whirligig Animation Studios	United States	2002–03	Direct-to-video
RoboDz Kazagumo Hen	1	26	Toei Animation; The Walt Disney Company	Japan	2008	Toon Disney; Disney Channel Asia
RollBots	1	26	Amberwood Entertainment	Canada	2009	YTV; Radio-Canada
SamSam	2	91	Bayard Jeunesse Animation; Araneo Belgium; Kaïbou Productions (season 3)	France	2007–24	France 5 Gulli
Saru Get You -On Air-	2	77	Xebec	Japan	2006–07	TV Tokyo
The Save-Ums!	2	39	The Dan Clark Company; Decode Entertainment	Canada	2003–05	Discovery Kids (United States); CBC
Scarecrowman	1	26	TMS Entertainment	Japan	2008	Tokyo MX
Shelldon	3	78	Shellhut Entertainment; Tiny Island Productions (seasons 1–2); AniTime (season 1); BeboydCG (season 1); Classic Media (season 1); Anya Animation Company (seasons 2–3); Lunchbox Studio (seasons 2–3); Animotif (season 2); Kantana Animation Studios (season 3); Teapot Studio (season 3); Ad Hoc Animation and Ad (season 3)	Thailand; Singapore (seasons 1–2); Taiwan (season 1)	2008–12	Qubo (United States); Channel 3
Sid the Science Kid	2	67	KCET Los Angeles; The Jim Henson Company	United States	2008–13	PBS Kids
Sitting Ducks	2	26	The Krislin Company; Creative Capers Entertainment; Krislin/Elliot Digital; Sitting Ducks Productions; USA Cable Entertainment (2001–02); Universal Network Television (2002–03)	United States; Canada	2001–03	Cartoon Network
SkyEye		500	Cartoon Saloon	China	2005–present	Hangzhou Television
Skyland	2	26	Method Films; 9 Story Entertainment	France; Canada	2005–07	France 2 Teletoon; Nicktoons (United States)
Special Agent Oso	2	60	Disney Television Animation	United States	2009–12	Disney Channel (2009–11); Disney Junior (2011–12)
Spider-Man: The New Animated Series	1	13	Mainframe Entertainment; Marvel Entertainment; Adelaide Productions; Sony Pictures Television	United States; Canada	2003	MTV; YTV
Sprookjesboom	4	156	Motek Entertainment	Netherlands	2006–09	Z@ppelin; Ketnet; NRW
Star Wars: The Clone Wars	7	133	Lucasfilm; Lucasfilm Animation; CGCG, Inc	United States	2008–20	Cartoon Network (seasons 1–5); Netflix (season 6); Disney+ (season 7)
Storm Hawks	2	52	Nerd Corps Entertainment	Canada	2007–09	YTV
Super Why!	3	103	DHX Media Toronto (seasons 1–2); DHX Studios Halifax (season 3); Out of the Blue Enterprises	Canada; United States	2007–16	PBS Kids; PBS Kids Sprout; CBC Kids
Superior Defender Gundam Force	2	52	Sunrise	Japan	2003–04	TXN (TV Tokyo)
Tak and the Power of Juju	1	26	THQ; Nickelodeon Animation Studio	United States	2007–09	Nickelodeon
Thomas & Friends (from Series 12)	24	584	HIT Entertainment (2003–17); Mattel Creations (2017–21)	United Kingdom	2008–21	Channel 5
Those Scurvy Rascals	1	26		United Kingdom	2005–06	Nickelodeon
Tiny Planets	5	145	Sesame Workshop; Pepper's Ghost Productions Ltd.	United Kingdom; United States	2001–05	CITV
Tortoise Hanba's Stories	2	104		China	2006–08	CCTV
Tractor Tom	2	52	Contender Entertainment Group; HRTV	United Kingdom	2002–04	ITV (CITV)
Transformers: Cybertron	1	52	Gonzo	Japan	2005	TXN (TVA and TV Tokyo)
Transformers: Energon	1	52	Actas; Studio A-Cat	Japan	2004	TXN (TV Tokyo)
Tripping the Rift	3	39	CinéGroupe; Film Roman	United States; Canada	2004–07	Sci Fi Channel; Space; Teletoon (season 3)
Turbo Dogs	1	26	CCI Entertainment	Canada	2008–11	Kids' CBC; Qubo (United States)
The Twisted Whiskers Show	1	26	American Greetings Properties; DQ Entertainment; MoonScoop LLC; Telegael	United States; Canada; Ireland; India	2009–10	The Hub; CBBC (United Kingdom); Teletoon
Underground Ernie	1	26	3DFilms; Joella Productions	United Kingdom	2006	CBeebies
Upin & Ipin	20	774	Les' Copaque Production	Malaysia	2007–present	TV9; Astro Ceria; Astro Prima; TV2
Urban Vermin	1	26	Decode Entertainment	Canada	2007	YTV
Usavich	6	78	Kanaban Graphics	Japan	2006–09	MTV Japan
Vipo: Adventures of the Flying Dog	1	26		Israel	2007–08	Hop! Channel
Viva Piñata	2	52	Bardel Entertainment; 4Kids Entertainment; Microsoft	Canada; United States	2006–09	YTV; Fox (2006–07); The CW (2008)
Weebles	1	10	Hasbro Entertainment; Film Roman	United States	2005	Direct-to-video
What's Your News?		52	Original Pictures; TT Animation	United Kingdom; Canada	2008	Nick Jr. CBC Television
WordWorld	3	45	Word World, LLC; The Learning Box; WTTW Chicago	United States	2007–11	PBS Kids
The WotWots	2	78	Pukeko Pictures; Weta Workshop	New Zealand	2009–11	TVNZ; Kidzone 24; ABC Kids
Xavier: Renegade Angel	2	20	PFFR Productions; Cinematico; Williams Street	United States	2007–09	Adult Swim
Xcalibur	1	40	Ellipsanime; TVA International (early episodes); Tooncan Productions Inc. (later episodes)	Canada; France	2001–02	YTV; Canal+ France 2
Z Rangers	1	26		South Korea	2008	KBS2
Z-Squad	1	26	Enemes; Daiwon C&A Holdings; KT; SOVIK; Nelvana	South Korea; Canada	2006–07	SBS
Zeke's Pad	1	26	Leaping Lizard Productions; Bardel Entertainment; Avrill Stark Entertainment; Flying Bark Productions (uncredited)	Canada; Australia	2008	YTV; Seven Network
Zigby	1	52	Flying Bark Productions; Avrill Stark Entertainment; Big Animation	Australia; Canada; Singapore	2009–13	ABC Kids; Treehouse TV
Zixx	3	39	The Nightingale Company; Rainmaker Entertainment	Canada	2004–09	YTV
The Zula Patrol	3	52	Gotham Entertainment (season 1); Kambooteron Productions (season 1); The Hatchery; Zula USA; UNC-TV; American Public Television	United States	2005–08	PBS Kids (member stations only)

== 2010s ==
Title	Season(s)	Episodes	Production	Country(ies)	Original broadcast	Channel/network
3Below: Tales of Arcadia	2	26	DreamWorks Animation Television; Double Dare You Productions	United States	2018–19	Netflix
44 Cats	2	104	Rainbow S.p.A. (Viacom); Antoniano; Rai Ragazzi	Italy	2018–21	Rai Yoyo; Nick Jr. Italy
47 Todōfuken R	1	12		Japan	2014	Nippon TV
The 99	2	52	Endemol Productions UK	United Kingdom; Canada	2011–12	The Hub (planned)
A-Squad	2	52		China	2019	Tencent Video
Abby Hatcher	2	52	Guru Studio; Spin Master Entertainment	Canada	2019–22	TVOKids; Knowledge Network; Télé-Québec
Adit Sopo Jarwo	2	200+	MD Animation	Indonesia	2014–present	MNCTV (2014–17; 2017–21); Global TV (2014); Trans TV (2017); RTV (2021–24); MDTV (2025–present)
The Adventures of Chuck and Friends	2	39	Hasbro Studios; Nelvana	United States; Canada	2010–12	The Hub
The Adventures of Figaro Pho	1	39		Australia	2012	ABC3
The Adventures of Paddington	3	117	Heyday Films; StudioCanal; Blue Zoo Animation Studio; Superprod Group	France; United Kingdom	2019–25	Gulli; M6; Piwi+ Nick Jr. Channel 5 Nickelodeon (International)
The Adventures of Puss in Boots	6	78	DreamWorks Animation Television	United States	2015–18	Netflix
Aeko & Friends	1	26		South Korea	2019–20	EBS1
Age of Gunslingers	3	36		China	2017–20	Tencent Video
Agent Binky: Pets of the Universe	3	104	Nelvana; Redknot	Canada	2019–24	Treehouse TV
Agi Bagi	3	52		Poland	2015	TVP ABC
The Airport Diary	3	195		China; South Korea	2012–16	KBS2
Ajin: Demi-Human	2	26	Polygon Pictures	Japan	2016	TBS; MBS; CBC
Alien Monkeys	1	52		South Korea	2014	SBS TV
Alien Pig Pipi	1	24		South Korea	2014	KBS1
Aliens Ninano	1	20		South Korea	2017	SBS TV
Alif & Sofia	2	104		Malaysia	2019–21	YouTube
Alisa Knows What to Do!	1	24	Bazelevs	Russia	2013–16	STS; Carousel
All Hail King Julien	6	78	DreamWorks Animation Television	United States	2014–17	Netflix
All New Jackie Chan Adventures	2	104		China	2017	
Alphablocks	5	121	Magic Lantern (series 1); Alphablocks Ltd. (series 2–specials); Blue Zoo Animation Studio (uncredited, credited in specials)	United Kingdom	2010–present	CBeebies
Alvinnn!!! and the Chipmunks	5	130	Bagdasarian Productions; Technicolor Animation Productions	United States; France	2015–23	M6; Nickelodeon/Nicktoons; Family Channel (Canada)
The Amazing World of Gumball	6	240	Cartoon Network Development Studio Europe; Studio Soi; Boulder Media (season 1); Dandelion Studios (season 1)	United Kingdom; United States; Germany; Ireland (season 1)	2011–19	Cartoon Network
Andy Pirki	3	80	AUM Animation Studios	India	2017	Pogo
Angelo Rules	5	272	TeamTO; Cake Entertainment; International Rheingold Productions	United States; France; United Kingdom; Germany	2010–22	France 3 (seasons 1–2); France 4 (season 3); Télétoon+ (seasons 4–5); Cartoon Network; Super RTL
Angry Birds Blues	1	30	Rovio Entertainment; Bardel Entertainment	Finland	2017	Toons.TV; YouTube
Angry Birds Stella	2	26	Rovio Entertainment; Anima Vitae (season 1); Cube Creative	Finland	2014–16	Toons.TV
Animal Rescue	1	52		South Korea	2019–20	KBS1
Antiks	1	52	One Animation	Singapore	2019	YouTube
Apollo's Tall Tales	1	52	Method Animation; Bidibul Productions; ZDF Enterprises	France	2019	France 5
Appleseed XIII	1	13	Production I.G	Japan	2011–12	
Arashi no Yoru ni: Himitsu no Tomodachi	1	26	Sparky Animation	Japan	2012	TXN
Arpeggio of Blue Steel -Ars Nova-	1	12	Sanzigen	Japan	2013	MBS
ARPO: The Robot for All Kids	1	52		South Korea	2012	MBC TV; YouTube
Arthur and the Children of the Round Table	2	98		France	2018	Télétoon+
Arthur and the Minimoys	1	26	Europacorp Television; Studio 100 Animation	France	2017–18	TiJi
Ask the StoryBots	3	22	JibJab Bros. Studios (2016–18); StoryBots Inc. (2019)	United States	2016–19	Netflix
Astro Não Mia	1	13		Brazil	2015	TV Rá-Tim-Bum
Astrobaldo	1	13		Brazil	2017	TV Brasil
AstroLOLogy	2	288	Lemon Sky Animation	Malaysia	2018–20	YouTube; J:COM (Japan
Athleticus	3	90		France	2018–present	Arte
Automatic Study Desk Wiki	2	1100		South Korea	2014–21	KBS2
As Aventuras de Fujiwara Manchester	1	13		Brazil	2017	TV Cultura
Babar and the Adventures of Badou	3	65	Nelvana Limited; TeamTO; Guru Studio (season 1); Pipeline Studios (season 1); LuxAnimation (seasons 1–2 only); The Clifford Ross Company	Canada; France; Luxembourg (seasons 1–2)	2010–15	YTV; TF1; Disney Junior
BabyRiki	6	266	FUN Union; Petersburg animation studio	Russia	2015–present	YouTube
Baku Tech! Bakugan	2	90		Japan	2012–13	TV Tokyo
Balloon Barnyard	1	26		Australia	2017	Disney Junior
Balloopo	2	78		South Korea	2013–14	EBS
Bananas in Pyjamas (2011)	3	156	Southern Star Group	Australia	2011–13	ABC2
BanG Dream! (seasons 2–3)	2	26	Sanzigen	Japan	2019–20	Tokyo MX; KBS Kyoto; BS11; AT-X
Bangle School	1	26		South Korea	2017–18	KBS1
Barbie Dreamhouse Adventures	5	52	Mainframe Studios; Mattel Television	United States; Canada	2018–20	Netflix; YTV
Barbie Dreamtopia (shorts)	1	8	Mattel Studios	United States	2016	YouTube
Barbie Dreamtopia: The Series	1	26	Mattel Studios	United States	2017–18	YouTube
Barbie: Life in the Dreamhouse	7	75	Arc Productions; Mattel Studios (2012–13); Mattel Playground Productions (2013–15); Resnick Interactive Group	United States; Canada	2012–15	YouTube; Nickelodeon (TV specials)
The Barkers	16	267	Melnitsa Animation Studio	Russia	2011–present	Russia-1; Carousel
Battle Through the Heavens	5			China	2017–present	Tencent Video
BBK/BRNK	2	24	Sanzigen	Japan	2016	Tokyo MX; AT-X
Be-Be-Bears	9	234	Digital Television Russia; Parovoz Animation Studio	Russia	2015–present	Carousel
Beastars	3	36	Orange	Japan	2019–present	Fuji TV (+Ultra)
Beat Bugs	3	39	Grace: A Storytelling Company; Thunderbird Entertainment (seasons 1–2); Beyond Entertainment; Atomic Cartoons (seasons 1–2); Seven Network	Australia; Canada (seasons 1–2)	2016–18	Netflix; 7TWO
Beat Monsters	1	52	Synergy Media; Animation Studio Goindol; SK Broadband	South Korea	2017	Cartoon Network
The Beet Party	1	104	ToonBox Entertainment; Redrover Co., Ltd.	Canada; South Korea	2012	Yoopa
Bela Criativa	1	13		Brazil	2018	TV Brasil
Bellbug Popo	1	52		South Korea	2013	KBS1
Berserk	2	24	GEMBA; Millepensee	Japan	2016–17	Wowow
Best Furry Friends		26		Australia	2019–present	Boomerang; 9Go!
Beware the Batman	1	26	Warner Bros. Animation; DC Entertainment	United States	2013–14	Cartoon Network (2013); Adult Swim (Toonami) (2014)
Beyond the Ocean	2	36		China	2018–20	iQIYI
Bibleman: The Animated Adventures	1	26		United States	2016–20	
Biklonz	5	111		South Korea	2014–16	SBS TV
Bing	2	104	Acamar Films; Brown Bag Films; Tandem Films (series 1 only); Digitales Studios	United Kingdom; Ireland	2014–19	CBeebies; S4C (Wales)
Bitz & Bob	2	44	BBC Children's Productions; FremantleMedia Kids & Family Entertainment (series 1); Jellyfish Pictures; Boat Rocker Media (series 2)	United Kingdom; Canada	2018–20	CBeebies
Blaze and the Monster Machines	9	180	Nerd Corps Entertainment (season 1); WildBrain Studios (season 2–present); Nickelodeon Animation Studio	United States; Canada	2014–25	Nickelodeon
Blinky and Knobby			Red Carpet Studio	Russia	2019	Ivi.ru
Bloody Code	1	26		China	2017–18	Bilibili iQIYI
Blue's Clues & You!	5	90	9 Story Media Group; Brown Bag Films; Nickelodeon Animation Studio	United States; Canada	2019–present	Nickelodeon (2019–23); Nick Jr. (2023–24); Treehouse TV; YouTube (2024–present)
Bob the Builder (2015)	3	130	HIT Entertainment (series 1–2); Mattel Creations (series 3)	United Kingdom	2015–18	Channel 5
Bob the Builder (from Ready, Steady, Build!)	2	40	HIT Entertainment	United Kingdom	2010–11	CBeebies
Bobby & Bill	2	104	Dargaud Media; Ellipsanime Productions; Belvision	France	2016–19	France 3
BoBoiBoy	3	52	Animonsta Studios	Malaysia	2011–16	TV3
BoBoiBoy Galaxy	2	40	Animonsta Studios	Malaysia	2016–present	TV3; YouTube; Netflix
Bodhi and Friends	4	156		China	2014	CCTV-14
Bolts & Blip	1	26	ToonBox Entertainment; Redrover Co., Ltd.	Canada; South Korea	2010–11	Teletoon; The CW (Vortexx)
Booba	5	109	3D Sparrow	Russia; United Kingdom	2014–present	YouTube
Boomba & Toomba	1	13		South Korea	2017	KBS1
Boonie Bears	11	728	Fantawild Animation	China	2012–present	Aniworld; BRTV Kaku; RTV and BTV (Indonesia)
Boonie Cubs	6	286	Fantawild Animation	China	2017–present	CCTV-14
The Boss Baby: Back in Business	4	49	DreamWorks Animation Television	United States	2018–20	Netflix
Bottersnikes and Gumbles	1	52	Cake Entertainment; Mighty Nice; Cheeky Little Media; Seven Productions; CBBC; Netflix Studios	Australia; United Kingdom	2015–16	7TWO; CBBC; Netflix
Bread Barbershop	3	91		South Korea	2019–present	KBS1
Bubble Bip	2	52	Planeta Junior; Toonz Entertainment	Spain	2014	Super3
Bubble Guppies	6	129	WildBrain Entertainment (season 1); Nelvana (seasons 2–4); Jam Filled Toronto (seasons 5–6); Nickelodeon Animation Studio	Canada; United States	2011–23	Nickelodeon
Bubble Marin	1	52		South Korea	2014	EBS
Bugsted	1	13	Vodka Capital; Televisa Home Entertainment; Ánima Estudios	Spain; Mexico	2013	
Burka Avenger	4	52	Unicorn Black	Pakistan	2013–16	Geo Tez (season 1); Nickelodeon Pakistan (seasons 2–4)
Business Fish	1	6	IANDA	Japan	2019	Tokyo MX; BS11
Butterbean's Café	2	60	Brown Bag Films; Nickelodeon Animation Studio	United States; Ireland	2018–20	Nickelodeon (2018–19); Nick Jr. Channel (2019–20)
Buzzu in the Intergalactic School	2	52	StartAnima; Centauro Group	Brazil; Colombia	2018–19	Nat Geo Kids; Globoplay; DreamWorks Channel; Amazon Prime; Looke; ClaroTV; Vivo TV+
Calimero (2014)	2	104	Gaumont Animation; TeamTO	France	2014–16	TF1
Canimals	2	109	Voozclub Co., Ltd. BRB Internacional; Screen 21; Aardman Animations	United Kingdom; South Korea; Spain	2011–15	EBS1; ITV (CITV)
Capsule Boy	2	52		South Korea	2016–19	KBS1 (season 1); SBS TV (season 2)
Care Bears & Cousins	2	12	American Greetings; American Greetings Properties	United States	2015–16	Netflix
Care Bears: Welcome to Care-a-Lot	1	26	American Greetings	United States	2012	The Hub
Ceratops Koriyo	1	13		South Korea	2014	KBS2
Chacha Bhatija	2	195		India	2016–present	Hungama TV
Chaplin & Co	1	104	Method Animation; MK2 TV; DQ Entertainment; Fabrique D'Images	France; India	2011–12	International Syndication; France 3
Charley Goes to School	2	104	Les Armateurs	France	2013–16	France 5
Charlie's Colorforms City	6	34	9 Story USA; DHX Studios Halifax/IoM Media Ventures	United States; Canada	2019–22	Netflix
Chatty Toritori	5	32		South Korea	2019–present	JEI TV
Chi's Sweet Adventure	3	88	Marza Animation Planet	Japan	2016–present	TV Tokyo
Cille	5	66	CORDOBA	Turkey	2011–19	TRT Çocuk
City of Friends	2	52		Norway	2010	TV 2
Clanners			Ink Apache; Radio Televisión Española (RTVE); Selecta Visión	Spain	2011–12	Clan
Cleo & Cuquin	3	107	Ánima Kitchent; Televisa; MAI Productions; Selecta Visión	Spain; Mexico	2018–20	Clan
Cloudbabies	1	52	Studio Liddell	United Kingdom	2012–13	CBeebies
Coconut the Little Dragon	2	104		Germany	2015–20	KiKA
Code Lyoko: Evolution	1	26	MoonScoop; Lagardère Thématiques	France	2013	France 4 Canal J
CoNaBlue	2	104		China	2019	Tencent Video
Conni	2	52		Germany	2012–15	KiKA
Cosmicrew	4	156		China	2018	
Counting with Paula	7	368		Singapore	2014–present	Okto
Cracké	1	52	Squeeze Animation Studio	Canada	2016	Teletoon
Cry Babies: Magic Tears	5	94	Hampa Animation Studio	Spain	2018–present	YouTube
Cuby Zoo	1	52		South Korea	2016–17	EBS1
Cutie Cubies	2	52	Parovoz Animation Studio	Russia	2017–20	Tlum HD
Da Jammies	1	13	Toon Farm Animation LLC. Gama Entertainment; Cosmic Toast	United States; Canada	2015	Netflix
DaDuDiDo	5	30	Les' Copaque Production	Malaysia	2014–present	YouTube
Daily Life Safety with Amber	1	26		South Korea	2018	EBS1
Danchi Tomoo	2	78		Japan	2013–15	NHK G
Darwin's Yearbook	1	6	Cartoon Network Studios Europe	United Kingdom; United States	2019	Cartoon Network
Deadly Response	1	30		China	2019	Tencent Video
The Deep	4	65	A Stark Production; Technicolor (seasons 1–3); Nerd Corps Entertainment (season 1); WildBrain Studios (seasons 2–4); Infinite Studios (season 4); BBC Children's Productions (season 4)	Australia; Canada; France (seasons 1–3); Singapore (season 4); United Kingdom (season 4)	2015–22	WildBrainTV; 7TWO; CBBC
The Defenders	1	8		Russia	2015–16	Moolt
Dennis & Gnasher: Unleashed!	2	103	Beano Studios; CBBC Production; Jellyfish Pictures	United Kingdom	2017–21	CBBC; Netflix
Denver, the Last Dinosaur	1	52		France	2018	M6
Descendants: Wicked World	2	33	Bad Angels Productions; 5678 Productions; Disney Television Animation	United States; Canada	2015–17	Disney Channel
The Dibidogs	1	26		Finland; China	2010–12	MTV3; MTV3 Juniori; CCTV-14
Digby Dragon	2	78	Blue-Zoo Productions	United Kingdom	2016–19	Channel 5 Nick Jr.
Dimension High School	1	12	Asmik Ace; Polygon Magic	Japan	2019	Tokyo MX
Dino Aventuras	2	52		Brazil	2015–18	Disney Channel; Disney Junior
DinoCore	5	65		South Korea	2016–19	Tooniverse
Dinopaws		52	Kindle Entertainment; Guru Studio	United Kingdom; Canada	2014–15	CBeebies; Treehouse TV
Dinotrux	8	78	DreamWorks Animation Television	United States	2015–18	Netflix
Doc McStuffins	5	136	Brown Bag Films	United States; Ireland	2012–20	Disney Junior
Doodleboo				France	2015	Canal+ Family
The Doozers	2	72	DHX Media; The Jim Henson Company	Canada; United States	2013–18	Kids' CBC; Hulu
Dosis de Familia	4			Venezuela	2011–15	
Douluo Dalu		263		China	2018–present	Tencent Video
Dr. W		78		Spain	2011	Super3
Dragon Egg	1	52		South Korea	2017–19	KBS2 (2017); KBS1 (2018–19)
The Dragon Prince	7	63	Wonderstorm; MWM Universe; Bardel Entertainment	United States; Canada	2018–24	Netflix
Dragons et Princesses	1	10	Nord-Ouest Films; Studio O Canal+	France	2010	Canal+ Family
Dream Defenders	1	26	Tiny Island Productions	Singapore	2011	3net
Dream Tower	1	13		China	2018	Bilibili iQIYI
Dreamkix	1	26	Designstorm Animation Studio	South Korea	2010	Seoul Broadcasting System; Disney Channel (Southeast Asia)
DreamWorks Dragons	8	118	DreamWorks Animation Television	United States	2012–18	Cartoon Network (2012–14); Netflix (2015–18)
DreamWorks Dragons: Rescue Riders	6	53	DreamWorks Animation Television	United States	2019–22	Netflix (2019–20); Peacock (2021–22)
Driver Dan's Story Train	2	103	Two Four 54; 3Line Media	United Kingdom; United Arab Emirates	2010–12	CBeebies; Al Jazeera Children's Channel (MENA)
Duda & Dada	3	78		South Korea	2013–21	EBS1
Dufan the Defender	1	26	Ancol Dreamlight Studios	Indonesia	2012	Indosiar
Dunia Eicak	1	26		Malaysia	2012	TV3
Eager Beaver		77	100 Kilowatt	Russia	2018	Carousel
Eddie is a Yeti	1	26			2016	Toon Goggles
Egg Goog	2	26		South Korea	2018–19	SBS TV
Ejen Ali	3	39	WAU Animation; The Walt Disney Company (Southeast Asia) Pte. Ltd. (season 3)	Malaysia	2016–23	TV3 (2016–18, 2023–present); Disney+ Hotstar (2022–23)
Ek Tha Jungle	1	26	Accel Animation Studios	India	2010	Disney Channel
Elena of Avalor	3	77	Disney Television Animation	United States	2016–20	Disney Channel; Disney Junior
Ella Bella Bingo	3	104	August Media Holdings Pte Ltd; Kool Produktion AS	Singapore; Norway	2009–15	NRK
Ella the Elephant	1	26	DHX Cookie Jar Inc. FremantleMedia Kids & Family Entertainment	Canada	2013–14	TVOKids
Émilie	1	52	Blue Spirit	France	2012	France 5
Endangered Species	1	26	Nerd Corps Entertainment	Canada	2015	Teletoon
Enertips	1	26		Spain	2010	Super3
Entong				Indonesia	2013	MNCTV
Ernest & Celestine, The Collection	2	52		France	2017–21	France 5
Everything's Rosie	4	105	V&S Entertainment Ltd.	United Kingdom	2010–17	CBeebies; Baraem TV (series 1–2)
Fairy-teens	2	27	Agama Film	Russia	2019–present	Carousel
Fancy Nancy	3	63	Disney Television Animation	United States	2018–22	Disney Junior; Disney Channel; Disney+ (season 3)
Fantasy Patrol	5	130	Studio Parovoz	Russia	2016–present	Moolt; Moolt in Cinema; YouTube
Fantasy Patrol: The Chronicles	3	78	Studio Parovoz	Russia	2019–present	Moolt; YouTube
Fantasy Westward Journey	4	52		China	2014–16	iQIYI; Mango TV; Tencent Video; Youku
Fast & Furious Spy Racers	6	52	Universal Television; DreamWorks Animation Television; Original Film (uncredited); Chris Morgan Productions (uncredited)	United States	2019–21	Netflix
Filly Funtasia	2	26	Dracco Brands (2012–19); BRB Internacional (2012–16); Studio 21 (2012–16); Black Dragon Entertainment (2012–16); Guangzhou Huamai Animation Studios (2018–20); B-Water Animation Studios (2018–20); Zhaolong Culture (2019–20)	Hong Kong; Spain; China	2019–20	iQIYI
Fire Engine Ray	2	52		South Korea	2016–23	EBS1
Fire Robo	1	26		South Korea	2016–17	EBS1
Fire Safety with Roy	1	26		South Korea	2017	EBS1
Fish n' Chips	1	52	Cyber Group Studios	France	2011–12	Gulli
Fist of the Blue Sky: Regenesis	2	24	Polygon Pictures	Japan	2018	Tokyo MX; KBS Kyoto; Sun TV; BS Fuji
Fixi in Playland	3	40		Sweden	2019–21	Viaplay
The Fixies	6	266	Aeroplane Productions; Riki Group	Russia	2010–present	Russia-1 (2010–14); Bibigon; Carousel (2011–present); Russia-K (2014); Da Vinci; PLUSPLUS (2014–22)
The Flamin' Thongs		26		Australia	2014	ABC3
Fleabag Monkeyface	1	52	Sparky Animation; Impossible Kids; Editude Pictures; Walker Productions	United Kingdom; Singapore	2011–12	ITV (CITV)
Flipos	1	13		Chile	2010–11	Canal 13
Floogals	3	130	Nevision Studios; Jellyfish Pictures; Zodiak Kids Studios	United Kingdom	2016–20	Nick Jr. Sprout/Universal Kids (United States)
Foot 2 Rue Extreme	1	39		France; Italy	2014–15	France 3
Forky Asks a Question	1	10	Pixar Animation Studios	United States	2019–20	Disney+
The Fox Badger Family	2	104		France	2018	France 5
Franklin and Friends	2	52	Infinite Frameworks; Nelvana	Canada; Singapore	2011–13	Treehouse TV; Mediacorp
Fruit Ninja: Frenzy Force	1	13		United States	2017	YouTube Premium
Fujilog	2	26		Japan	2011	TVS; Sun TV
G-Fighters	1	26		South Korea	2014–15	EBS
Gaspard and Lisa	2	51	Chorion; Impossible Television	United States; France; United Kingdom	2011–13	Canal+ Family; CITV; Disney Junior (United States)
Gattu Battu			Toonz Animation; Symbiosis; Green gold animation Hi-tech animation Studio 56; 88pictures Irealities	India	2017–20	Nickelodeon Sonic; Nickelodeon
gdgd Fairies	2	25	Bouncy	Japan	2011–13	Tokyo MX
Gecko's Garage				United Kingdom	2015–present	YouTube
Gen:Lock	2	16	Rooster Teeth Animation; Outlier Society Productions	United States	2019–21	RoosterTeeth (2019); HBO Max (2021)
Gigant Big-Shot Tsukasa	1	32	Fanworks; Forest Hunting One	Japan	2014–15	NHK E
Gigantosaurus	3	78	Cyber Group Studios; Kaibou; Blue Spirit Studio	France; Canada	2019–22	France 5 Disney Channel/Disney Junior
The Glass Mask Year 3 Class D	1	13	DLE	Japan	2016	Tokyo MX
Glumpers	2	104	Motion Pictures, S.A.	Spain	2011	Super3
Go Jetters	3	154	Boulder Media (series 1); Giant Animation (Series 1); BBC Studios Kids & Family; Blue-Zoo Productions (series 2–3)	United Kingdom	2015–20	CBeebies
Godofredo	1	13		Brazil	2017	TV Cultura
GoGo Bus	12	312		China	2019–present	
GoGo Dino	10			China; South Korea	2016–present	SBS TV (seasons 1–2); EBS1 (season 3–present)
Goldie & Bear	2	45	Milk Barn Entertainment (season 1); Titmouse, Inc. (season 2)	United States	2015–18	Disney Junior
Gon	2	76	Daewon Media	Japan	2012–15	TXN
Good Morning Today	1	20	The Jim Henson Company; ShadowMachine Films	United States	2013–14	Fusion
Gormiti	3	79	Giochi Preziosi; Planeta Junior; Kotoc Produccions	Italy; Spain	2018–21	Boing/Clan; Rai Gulp/RaiPlay/Rai Yoyo (Italy)
Gormiti Nature Unleashed	1	26	Giochi Preziosi; Mondo TV	Italy	2012–13	Cartoon Network; Boing
Grami's Circus Show	2	20	Studio Gale; KBS Media	South Korea	2012–17	KBS1
The Great Warrior Wall	1	40	2:10 AM Animation	China	2019	Youku
Green Lantern: The Animated Series	1	26	DC Entertainment; Warner Bros. Animation	United States	2011–13	Cartoon Network
Grizzy & the Lemmings	4	104	Hari	France	2016–present	France 3 Boomerang
Guan Hai Ce	2	32		China	2018–20	Tencent Video
Guitar & Drum	2	52		Brazil; Chile	2019	Disney Junior
Gummibär & Friends: The Gummy Bear Show	2	78	Gummybear International; Toonz Animation India	India; Germany	2016–22	YouTube
Guru Aur Bhole				India	2017	Sony YAY!
H_{2}Ooooh!	1	26		Italy	2010	Rai 2
The Happos Family	1	20	Ferrero; Spider Eye Productions; Cyber Group Studios	United Kingdom; France; Italy	2016–18	Boomerang; Cartoonito
Happy Kappy	1	25	Shougakukan Music & Digital Entertainment Inc.	Japan	2011	TV Tokyo
Hareport	1	26	Vivi Film	Belgium; France; Canada	2010	TF1
Heidi (2015)	2	65	Studio 100 Animation; Flying Bark Productions (season 1); Heidi, Pyld	France; Belgium; Australia	2015–20	ZDF; TF1 (TFOU)
Helen's Little School	1	52		Canada; France	2017–18	France 5
Hello Carbot				South Korea	2014–present	KBS1; SBS TV
Hello Ninja	4	39	Gorilla Poet Productions	United States	2019–21	Netflix
Henry Hugglemonster	2	49	Brown Bag Films	United States; Ireland	2013–15	Disney Junior
Hero Factory		11	Threshold Animation Studios; Lego Group; Geely	United States; Denmark; China	2010–14	Nicktoons
Heroes of Envell	2	52	Parovoz Animation Studio	Russia	2017–21	Tlum HD
Heroes of the City	2	52	Ruta Ett DVD AB; Your Family Entertainment (season 1)	Sweden	2012–14	Cartoon Network Sweden
Hi Score Girl	2	24	J.C.Staff; SMDE; BS11	Japan	2018–19	Tokyo MX; BS11; MBS
Hi-sCoool! SeHa Girls	1	13	TMS Entertainment	Japan	2014	Animax; Tokyo MX; Tochigi TV
The Hive	2	78	The Hive Enterprises; DQ Entertainment; Lupus Films; Monumental Productions	India; United Kingdom	2011–16	Disney Junior
Homies		86	100 Kilowatt	Russia	2017	Carousel
Hoshi no Shima no Nyanko	1	26		Japan	2018–19	Tokyo MX
I'm Joybo	2	24		China	2017–19	Bilibili iQIYI; Tencent Video; Youku
Ibn Battuta: The Animated Series				Malaysia	2010	TV2
Iconicles	1	26	Create Media Ventures (Iconicles Ltd.) phuuz entertainment Foothill Entertainment; Dinamo Productions	United Kingdom; United States	2011	CBeebies
ID-0	1	12	Sanzigen	Japan	2017	Tokyo MX; Sun TV; KBS; BS 11
Iesodo		13	Zaya Toonz; Rollman Entertainment	United States	2013–16	Direct-to-video
Ikémen Sengoku: Bromances Across Time	1	12	TMS Entertainment	Japan	2017	Tokyo MX
Imaginary Mary	1	9	David Guarascio Productions; Adam F. Goldberg Productions; Happy Madison Productions; ABC Studios; Sony Pictures Television	United States	2017	ABC
Infini-T Force	1	12	Digital Frontier; Tatsunoko Production	Japan	2017	ytv Nippon TV; FBS; STV; HTV; MMT
Ingress	1	11	Craftar	Japan	2018	Fuji TV (+Ultra); Kansai TV; Tokai TV; TNC; UHB; BS Fuji
Inner Ranger	1	3		South Korea	2011	EBS
Inspector Chingum	2	52		India	2018	Amazon Prime Video
Inspector Gadget (2015)	2	52	DHX Media; DHX Studios Halifax	Canada	2015–18	Teletoon (seasons 1); Family Channel (season 2)
Inspector Mergou			Not Found Prod Algerie	Algeria	2014–15	Echorouk TV
The Invasion of Awakening	3	52		China	2018–21	Tencent Video
Invizimals	1	26	BRB Internacional; Screen21 Media; Televisión Española; Corporació Catalana de Mitjans Audiovisuals; Sony Computer Entertainment; Digital Sky	Spain; China	2013	Clan; Super3
Insectibles	1	52	One Animation	Germany; Malaysia; Singapore	2015	Kika
Jack	3	39	Sparky Animation; PVP Media (Groupe PVP)	Canada	2011–14	TVOKids
Jarau	1	12		Brazil	2014	TV Brasil
Jelly Jamm	2	77	Vodka Capital; 737 SHAKER	Spain; United Kingdom	2011–13	Cartoonito (pan-European); Clan
Jerry and the Raiders	1	26	FAKE Digital Entertainment; First Star Studios	Canada	2016–17	TVOKids; Ici Radio-Canada Télé (French); Qubo (United States)
JingleKids		15		Russia	2015–20	YouTube
Jokebox	1	13		Spain	2011–12	TV3
JoNaLu	2	26	Scopas Medien	Germany	2010–16	Kinderkanal; Nick Jr. Disney Jr.
The Journey Home	1	26	P.I.C.S. W.BABA	Japan; South Korea	2018–19	Tokyo MX (Japan); KBS2 (South Korea)
Journey of Long	1	26	Studio Gale	South Korea	2019–20	KBS1
The Jungle Book	3	156	DQ Entertainment International; ZDF Enterprises; MoonScoop (seasons 1–2); Ellipsanime Productions (season 3); Les Cartooneurs Associés (season 3)	India; Germany; France	2010–19	Nickelodeon; TF1 (seasons 1–2); Piwi+ (season 3); ZDF
The Jungle Bunch: News Beat	1	26	TAT Productions	France	2011	France 3
The Jungle Bunch to the Rescue	3	158	TAT Productions; Master Films	France	2013–20	France 3
Jungle Survival	2	65		South Korea	2015–18	EBS1
Jurassic Cops	3	79		South Korea	2018–22	KBS1 (seasons 1–2); MBC TV (season 3)
Justin Time	3	78	Guru Studio	Canada	2011–16	Disney Junior; Netflix (series 3)
Kado: The Right Answer	1	12	Toei Animation	Japan	2017	Tokyo MX; MBS; BS Fuji; AT-X
Kaeloo	5	241	Cube Creative; Blue Spirit (seasons 1–2); Xilam (season 5)	France	2010–23	Canal+ (seasons 1–2); Télétoon+ (season 3–4); Canal+ Kids (season 5)
Kagagi	1	13	Arcana Studio; Animation Engine	Canada	2014	APTN
Kate & Mim-Mim	2	47	FremantleMedia Kids & Family Entertainment; Nerd Corps Entertainment (season 1); DHX Studios (season 2)	Canada; United Kingdom	2014–18	Knowledge Network; BBC Kids; CBeebies
Katuri	5	156		South Korea	2016–present	EBS1
Kazoops!	3	78	Cheeky Little Media; Giggle Garage Animations; Mighty Nice; Nexus Studios	Australia; Malaysia; United Kingdom	2016–17	CBeebies (2016–17); ABC Kids (2016); Netflix (2016)
Keluarga Somat		26	Dreamtoon Animation Studios	Indonesia	2013–17	Indosiar
Kemono Friends	2	24	Yaoyorozu (season 1); Tomason (season 2)	Japan	2017–19	TV Tokyo; TV Osaka; TV Aichi; AT-X
Kemurikusa	1	12	Yaoyorozu	Japan	2019	Tokyo MX
Kengan Ashura	2	52	Larx Entertainment	Japan	2019–24	Netflix
Kicko & Super Speedo			Green Gold Animations	India	2018	Sony YAY!
Kiddets	1	52	Pukeko Pictures; Hengxin Shambala Kids Cultural Industry Development Co., Ltd.	New Zealand; China	2018–19	TVNZ; Australian Broadcasting Corporation
Kiko	2	103	MNC Animation	Indonesia	2016–22	RCTI; MNCTV; ZooMoo; Disney XD
KikoRiki: New Adventures	1	57		Russia	2012–13	Channel One
KikoRiki: Pin-Code	4	104		Russia	2012–18	Channel One
The King of Fighters: Destiny	1	24	Animonsta Studios iDragons Creative Studio	China; Malaysia	2017–18	
Kingdom Force	1	26	Industrial Brothers; Boat Rocker Studios; Jam Filled Entertainment	Canada	2019–20	CBC Kids and Radio-Canada
Kings of Atlantis	1	13	Omnia Media; Mighty Coconut; YouTube Studio	United States	2017	YouTube Premium
Kioka	1	78		South Korea	2012	KBS2
The Kitchen: Animated Series	1	20		Ukraine	2017	Novyi Kanal
Kiwi & Strit	3	65	Copenhagen Bombay	Denmark	2015	SVT Barnkanalen (Sweden)
Klump	1	26		Denmark; Germany; United Kingdom	2018	KiKA
Klumpies	1	26		Belgium	2010	Ketnet
Knight Rusty	2	52		Germany	2013–14	KiKA
Knights of Sidonia	2	24	Polygon Pictures	Japan	2014–15	MBS
Knights of the Zodiac: Saint Seiya	2	36	Toei Animation	Japan; United States	2019–24	Netflix (season 1); Crunchyroll (season 2)
Kody Kapow	1	26	Jam Filled Entertainment; Zodiak Kids	Canada; United States	2017	Sprout
Kong: King of the Apes	2	23	Arad Animation; 41 Entertainment; OLM, Digital; Sprite Animation Studios; ICON Creative Studio (Season 2)	United States; Canada; Japan	2016–18	Netflix
Kongsuni and Friends	8			South Korea	2014–present	JEI TV (seasons 1–2); Animax (seasons 3–4); KBS1 (seasons 5–7); KBS2 (season 8)
Konna Watashi-tachi ga Nariyuki de Heroine ni Natta Kekka www 'Narihero www'	1	12		Japan	2014	Tokyo MX
Köstebekgiller	1	13		Turkey	2011	TRT Çocuk
Kukuli				Turkey	2013	YouTube
Kung Fu Panda: Legends of Awesomeness	3	80	DreamWorks Animation Television; Nickelodeon Animation Studio	United States	2011–16	Nickelodeon (2011–14); Nicktoons (2016)
Kung Fu Panda: The Paws of Destiny	1	26	DreamWorks Animation Television	United States	2018–19	Amazon Prime Video
Lale Ki Lolu	1	26		Israel	2018	BabyTV
Land of the Lustrous	1	12	Orange	Japan	2017	AT-X; Tokyo MX; BS11; MBS
Lanfeust Quest	1	26	Gaumont Animation; Gaumont Television; DQ Entertainment; Cofinova 23; Devanim; Backup Media; Dapaco Productions	France	2013–14	M6; Canal J
Larva	6	332	TUBAⁿ	South Korea	2011–present	KBS 1TV (2011); KBS 2TV (2013); JEI TV (2014–15); Netflix (2018–24); SBS TV (2024–present)
Lassie (season 2)	1	26	Superprod Animation	France	2014–20	TF1; Télétoon+ ZDF; KIKA
The Legend of Ancient Soul	1	24		China	2017–18	Tencent Video
Legends of Chima	3	41	M2Film	Denmark	2013–14	Cartoon Network
Lego Bionicle: The Journey to One	1	5	The Volta	United States	2016	Netflix
Lego City Adventures	4	65	Passion Paris; Axis Studios (season 1–2); The Lego Group; Circus (and Circus Animation)	France; United Kingdom; Denmark	2019–22	Nickelodeon (2019 –20); Netflix (2022); YouTube (2022)
Lego Friends: Girls on a Mission	4	70		United States	2018–21	YouTube
Lego Friends of Heartlake City	5	19		United States	2012–17	Disney Channel; Super RTL
Lego Friends: The Power of Friendship	2	4		United States	2016	Netflix
Lego Hidden Side	2	20		United States	2019–20	YouTube
Lego Jurassic World: Legend of Isla Nublar	1	13	Atomic Cartoons; The Lego Group	Canada; United States	2019	Family Channel
Lego Star Wars: All-Stars	1	5		United States	2018	Disney XD
Lego Star Wars: Droid Tales	1	5	Lucasfilm	United States	2015	Disney XD
Lego Star Wars: The Freemaker Adventures	2	26	Wil Film ApS; Lucasfilm; The Lego Group	United States	2016–17	Disney XD
Lego Star Wars: The Resistance Rises	1	5	Lucasfilm	United States	2016	Disney XD
Lego Star Wars: The Yoda Chronicles	2	7		United States	2013–14	Cartoon Network (season 1); Disney XD (season 2)
Leliko	2		Düşyeri Cartoon Film Studio	Turkey	2013–17	Planet Çocuk
Leo & Tig	3	78	Digital Television Russia; Parovoz Animation Studio	Russia	2016–present	Moolt; Tlum HD
Leo da Vinci	2	104		Italy	2019–24	Rai Gulp; Rai 2
Levius	1	12	Polygon Pictures	Japan	2019	Netflix
Lilybuds	1	52	Zodiak Kids Studio France; Blue Spirit Studio; France Televisions	France; United Kingdom	2018–19	Discovery Kids (Latin American); TiJi; Knowledge Kids (Canada); Tiny Pop
Limon and Oli	2	54	Mart Ajans	Turkey	2012–20	TRT Children's Channel; Disney Channel; Disney Junior
Ling Cage	1	16		China	2019–present	Bilibili
Little Baby Bum				United Kingdom	2011–present	YouTube
Little Charley Bear	4	52	Chapman Entertainment; Annix Studios	United Kingdom	2011–15	CBeebies
Little Charmers	2	57	Atomic Cartoons; Spin Master Entertainment; Nelvana	Canada	2015–17	Treehouse TV
The Little Farmer Rabby	1	52		South Korea	2016–17	KBS2 (2016); KBS1 (2017)
Little Hero Super Z	2	52		South Korea	2018–20	EBS1
Little People	2	52	HIT Entertainment (season 1); Mattel Creations (season 2)	Canada; United States	2016–18	Sprout
The Little Prince	3	78	Method Animation; DQ Entertainment; Rai Fiction; LP Animation; La Fabrique D'Images; Sony Pictures Home Entertainment (seasons 1–2); AB Productions (season 3); ARD; SES S.A.	France; Italy; Switzerland	2010–15	France 3 TSR; Rai 2 (seasons 1–2); Rai Yoyo (season 3)
Little Tiaras	3	78	Melnitsa Animation Studio	Russia	2018–present	STS Kids
The Little Train Choo Choo	2			South Korea	2013–15	KBS2
The Long Long Holiday	1	10	Les Armateurs; Blue Spirit Animation	France	2015	France 3
Lorong Waktu	1	18	CookIt Studio	Indonesia	2019	SCTV (2019); Vidio (2019–present)
Lost in Oz	2	26	Bureau of Magic; Amazon Studios	United States	2015–18	Amazon Prime Video
Love, Death & Robots	4	45	Blur Studio	United States	2019–25	Netflix
Lucas the Spider (shorts)	2	32		United States	2017–21	YouTube
Lulu Zipadoo	2	104	Mondo TV France	France	2010–13	France 5
Lumi & Bo		17		Germany	2017	Nickelodeon
Luna Petunia	5	33	Saban Brands; BrainPower Studio; Cirque du Soleil	United States; Canada	2016–18	Netflix
Mac & Izzy	1	7	Blue Zoo Animation Studio	United Kingdom	2016	YouTube
Mack & Moxy	1	12	Socially Dynamic Entertainment; Georgia Public Broadcasting	United States	2016	PBS Kids; Family Jr. (Canada)
Mademoiselle Zazie	1	78	Cyber Group Studios; Scrawl Studios	France; Singapore	2013–14	France 5
Magic Adventures: The Crystal of Dark	1	52		South Korea	2016–17	KBS1
Magic Han War	2	52		South Korea	2011–15	MBC TV
Magic Kitchen		75	100 Kilowatt	Russia	2019–present	Carousel
Magic Lantern		104	Parovoz Animation Studio	Russia	2015–16	Moolt
The Magnificent Kotobuki	1	12	GEMBA	Japan	2019	Tokyo MX
Mansour	5	105	ICE Animations; Yowza Digital	United Arab Emirates	2013–19	Abu Dhabi TV; Sama Dubai TV
Martial Universe	4	48		China	2019–present	Tencent Video
Martine	2	104	Les Armateurs	France	2012–17	M6
Mashimaro	3	210		China; South Korea	2018–20	iQIYI
Mask Masters	1	26		South Korea	2013	KBS1
Matt Hatter Chronicles	4	52	Platinum Films; Arc Productions (seasons 1–2); Dream Mill (seasons 1–2); Xentrix Studios (seasons 3–4)	United Kingdom; Canada	2011–15	Nicktoons; CITV; Teletoon; TRTÉ (Ireland)
Max Steel (2013)	2	52	Nerd Corps Entertainment (seasons 1–2); FremantleMedia Enterprises (seasons 1–2); Mattel Studios (season 1); Mattel Playground Productions (season 2)	Canada; United Kingdom; United States	2013–14	Disney XD (2013); Netflix (2014)
Maya the Bee	2	130	Studio 100 Animation	Germany; France	2012–17	ZDF; TF1
Me and My Robot	1	52		France; South Korea	2013	EBS1; France 3
Mega Man: Fully Charged	1	52	Capcom; Dentsu Entertainment USA; DHX Media; DHX Studios Vancouver	United States; Canada	2018–19	Cartoon Network; Family Chrgd
Messy Goes to OKIDO	3	104	Doodle Productions; Rooks Nest Entertainment; Eye Present (formerly Squint/Opera); WildBrain	United Kingdom	2015–23	CBeebies
Meta Runner	3	28	Glitch Productions	Australia	2019–22	YouTube
Mia and Me	4	104	Made 4 Entertainment (formerly Lucky Punch) (seasons 1–3); Hahn Film AG; ZDF; March Entertainment (seasons 1–2); Rainbow S.p.A. (seasons 1–2); Rai Fiction (seasons 1–2)	Germany; Canada (seasons 1–2); Italy (seasons 1–2)	2012–23	KiKa; ZDF; Canal+ Rai 2 Rai Gulp; Nick Jr. Channel; Nickelodeon
Mickey and the Roadster Racers/Mickey Mouse Mixed-Up Adventures	3	87	Disney Television Animation	United States	2017–21	Disney Junior
Middle School Moguls	1	4	Gengirl Media; Nickelodeon Animation Studio	United States	2019	Nickelodeon
Miffy's Adventures Big and Small	9	104	Blue Zoo Animation Studio; Mercis BV	Netherlands; United Kingdom	2015–17	KRO-NCRV (Netherlands); Tiny Pop
Mighty Little Bheem	3	64	Green Gold Animations	India	2019–20	Netflix
Mighty Mike	1	78	TeamTO; Digital Dimension	France; Canada	2019–20	France 3 Ici Radio-Canada Télé (French Canadian); Family Channel
Mike the Knight	3	75	Nelvana; HiT Entertainment	United Kingdom; Canada	2011–17	Treehouse TV; CBeebies
Miles from Tomorrowland	3	75	Wild Canary Animation	United States	2015–18	Disney Junior
Mini Beat Power Rockers	4	200		Argentine	2017–present	Discovery Kids
Miniforce	6		SAMG Entertainment	South Korea	2014–present	EBS1
Minnie's Bow-Toons	9	120	Disney Television Animation	United States	2011–present	Disney Junior
Miraculous: Tales of Ladybug & Cat Noir	6	157	ZAG Entertainment; Method Animation (seasons 1–5); Miraculous Corp. (season 6–present); Toei Animation Europe S.A.S. (seasons 1–5); SAMG Entertainment (seasons 1–3); SK Broadband (seasons 1–3); De Agostini Editore (season 2–present); Gravity Animation, Inc. (season 5); Kidsme S.R.L (season 6–present)	France	2015–present	TF1 (TFOU); Gloob (season 3–present); TFX (TFOU) (2024–present)
Modoo Modoo Show	1	26		South Korea	2016	MBC TV
The Mojicons	2	26		Russia	2015–16	STS
Monchhichi Tribe	2		Technicolor Animation Productions	France	2017	TF1
Mongo Wrestling Alliance	1	10	Mirari Films; Williams Street	United States; Romania	2011	Adult Swim
Monkart	1	52	SAMG Entertainment	South Korea	2017–18	EBS1
Monsikids	3	78	Petersburg Animation Studio; Riki Group; Soyuzmultfilm	Russia	2019–present	Carousel
Monster High: Adventures of the Ghoul Squad	1	14		United States	2017–18	YouTube
Monster Math Squad		132	DHX Media	Canada	2012–16	CBC Television
Monster Strike (season 2 Part 1 & season 3)	2	86	Sanzigen (season 2); Yokohama Animation Laboratory (season 2)	Japan	2017–19	YouTube
Monsters vs. Aliens	1	26	DreamWorks Animation; Nickelodeon Animation Studio	United States	2013–14	Nickelodeon
Moominvalley	4	52	Gutsy Animations	Finland; United Kingdom	2019–24	Yle TV2; Sky One
Mooshak Gungun				India	2016	Maha Cartoon TV
Moriki Doriki	1	13	Parovoz Animation Studio	Russia	2018–20	
Motown Magic	2	51	Grace - A Storytelling Company; Beyond Entertainment; PolyGram Entertainment; EMI Music Publishing; Sony-ATV Music Publishing	United States; Australia	2018–19	Netflix; 7TWO
Motu Patlu	15	1,190	Maya Digital Studios; Viacom18	India	2012–present	Nickelodeon
Mr. Moon	1	52	Sparky Animation; Skaramoosh London; Title Entertainment	Singapore; United Kingdom; Canada	2010	TVOKids; Knowledge Kids; SCN; Playhouse Disney
Mudpit	2	26	Cookie Jar Entertainment	Canada	2012–13	Teletoon
Mundo Ripilica	2	26		Brazil	2017	Discovery Kids
Muppet Babies (2018)	3	71	The Muppets Studio; Odd Bot Animation	United States	2018–22	Disney Junior
Mutant Busters	1	52		Spain	2015	Neox Kidz
My Friend Koriri	1	26		South Korea	2018–19	SBS TV
My Knight and Me	1	52	TeamTO; Thuristar	France; Belgium	2016–17	OUFtivi (Wallonia); Télétoon+ Canal+ Family
Nanocore	3			China	2014–17	Tencent Video; Youku
Naria Girls	1	12	Bouncy	Japan	2016	Tokyo MX
Neobot Master	1	52		South Korea	2017–19	KBS2
The New Adventures of Figaro Pho	1	39	Screen Australia; Australian Broadcasting Corporation; Ambience Entertainment; Chocolate Liberation Front; Fulcrum Media Finance	Australia	2015	ABC3
The New Adventures of Peter Pan	2	52	DQ Entertainment	France; India	2012–16	DeA Kids (Italy); France 3
Nexo Knights	4	40	The Lego Group; M2 Entertainment; Wilbros	Denmark; Canada	2015–17	Cartoon Network
Nick the Inventor		79	100 Kilowatt	Russia	2019–present	Carousel
Nils Holgersson	1	52	Studio 100 Animation	France	2017	France 3
Nina Sahabatku		26	Dreamtoon Animation Studios	Indonesia	2013–15	Indosiar
Nine Songs of the Moving Heavens	2	90	Sparkly Key	China	2016–19	iQIYI; LeTV; Mango TV; Sohu Video; Tencent Video; Youku
Ninjago	15	210	Wil Film ApS (pilot episodes–season 10); WildBrain Studios (seasons 11–15); The Lego Group	Denmark; Canada (seasons 11–15)	2011–22	Cartoon Network (Scandinavia); Teletoon; YTV; Cartoon Network
No-No	1	52		France	2018	Piwi+
Noddy, Toyland Detective	2	104	Gaumont Animation; DreamWorks Animation Television	France; United Kingdom; United States	2016–20	France 5/Piwi+ Channel 5 Universal Kids
Nori: Roller Coaster Boy	2	52		China; New Zealand; South Korea	2017–18	KBS2
Numberblocks	8	188	Blue-Zoo; Alphablocks Ltd.	United Kingdom	2017–present	CBeebies
The Numtums	3	77	Beakus; A Productions; BBC	United Kingdom	2012–13	CBeebies
Nussa	3	74	The Little Giantz; 4Stripe Productions; YouTube Studio (2018)	Indonesia	2018–21	YouTube
Nyanbo!	1	26	Shirogumi	Japan	2016–17	NHK E
Octonauts	5	121	Brown Bag Films (series 1–4); Mainframe Studios (series 5–present); Chorion (series 1); Sony Pictures Television Kids (series 2–present)	United Kingdom; Ireland	2010–present	CBeebies
Oddbods	4	208	One Animation	Singapore	2013–present	Boomerang; YouTube
The Oddbods Show	4	208	One Animation	Singapore; United Kingdom	2016–present	Disney Channel (Asia); Disney XD (United States); CITV; Boomerang; Netflix (season 3); YouTube (season 4 and specials)
Off the Air	14	52	Williams Street; Million Monkeys Inc.	United States	2011–present	Adult Swim
Oh No! It's an Alien Invasion	2	40	Nelvana	Canada	2013–15	YTV (2013–14); Teletoon (2014–15)
Oko Lele	6	119	Metal Brain Studio	United States	2019–present	YouTube
Olly the Little White Van	6	78	Ideas at Work; Blink Animation Studios	United Kingdom	2011–13	CITV; Channel 5 Cartoonito
Omar & Hana	5	117	Digital Durian	Malaysia	2017–21	Astro Ceria
Onyankopon	1	12	Kyotoma	Japan	2017	MixChannel; Tokyo MX
Oops! I-Kooo	2	52		South Korea	2010–12	EBS1
Origanimals	2	52	Giggle Garage	Malaysia	2016	ZooMoo Network
Oscar's Oasis	1	78	TeamTO; Tuba Entertainment; Cake Entertainment; Synergy Media	France; South Korea	2010–11	Canal+ Family / Télétoon+ TF1; EBS
Otoppe		265	pH Studio	Japan	2017–23	NHK E
The Owl & Co	2	156	Studio Hari	France	2013	France 3 Boomerang
Les P'tites Poules	1	32		France	2010	France 5
Pac-Man and the Ghostly Adventures	3	52	41 Entertainment; Arad Productions; Bandai Namco Games; OLM Digital; Sprite Animation Studios	United States; Japan; Canada	2013–15	Disney XD; Tokyo MX
Pada Zaman Dahulu	6	165	Les' Copaque Production	Malaysia	2011–present	TV Alhijrah; Astro Ceria; Astro Prima
Panda and Little Mole	1	52		China; Czech Republic	2016–17	CCTV-14; TV Barrandov
Panda and Rooster	1	52		China; Portugal	2019–20	CCTV-14
Paopao in the Baobab Islands	1	52		South Korea	2014	EBS
Paper Tales	2	78	Parovoz Animation Studio	Russia	2015–16	Moolt; Carousel
Pat a Pat Como	1	18		South Korea	2015	SBS TV
Pat the Dog	2	51	Superprod Animation; Superprod Studio (season 2); Animoka Studios; Toon Factory (season 1); Grid Animation (season 1); Rai Fiction (season 1)	France; Italy; Belgium (season 1)	2017–22	Télétoon+ Canal+ Family; Rai Gulp; La Trois (season 1); OUFtivi (season 1); Ketnet (season 1)
Paw Patrol	14	320	Spin Master Entertainment; Guru Studio	Canada	2013–present	TVOntario
Peeping Life TV Season 1??	1	12	Forest Hunting One	Japan	2015	Nippon TV
Peet the Forest Detective	4	104		South Korea	2014–present	EBS1
Peter Rabbit	2	56	Brown Bag Films; Penguin Books; Silvergate Media	United Kingdom; Ireland	2012–16	CBeebies; Nickelodeon (United States)
Picnic with Cake	1	13		Netherlands	2012	KRO Kindertijd
Piggy Tales (from Third Act)	4	67	Rovio Animation	Finland	2014–19	Toons.TV
Pingu in the City	2	52	Dandelion Animation Studio; Polygon Pictures	Japan	2017–19	NHK E
Pinkfong Wonderstar	3	71		South Korea	2019–present	KBS2
Pipilu Rangers	3	104		China; South Korea	2019–21	EBS1
Pirata & Capitano	2	104	Millimages	France	2016	France 5
Pirates: Adventures in Art	1	22	Halifax Film Company; Privateer II Productions	Canada	2010–11	CBC Television
The Pirates Next Door	1	52		France	2017	France 3
PJ Masks	6	151	Entertainment One; Hasbro Entertainment (season 6); Frog Box Productions; TeamTO; Walt Disney EMEA Productions Limited	France; United Kingdom	2015–24	Disney Channel/Disney Junior/Disney+ (worldwide); France 5 (seasons 1–5); TF1 (season 6)
Planet Sheen	1	26	Nickelodeon Animation Studio; Omation Animation Studio	United States	2010–13	Nickelodeon (2010–11); Nicktoons (2012–13)
Plankton Invasion	1	78	TeamTO	France	2011	Canal+
Playback	1	20		China	2016–17	Tencent Video
The Polos	1	52		Canada	2019–20	Discovery Family
Pom Pom and Friends	1	78		South Korea	2011	EBS
Popples (2015)	3	26	Saban Brands; Method Animation; Zagtoon; Nexus Factory; Umedia; DQ Entertainment International	United States; France; Belgium	2015–16	Netflix
A Portrait of Jianghu: Bad Guys	6	171		China	2014–present	iQIYI; LeTV; Sohu Video; Tencent Video
Power Battle Watch Car	2	52	SAMG Entertainment	South Korea	2015–16	MBC TV
Power Players	1	78	Zagtoon; Method Animation; Man of Action Studios; Kaibou; ON Kids & Family	United States; France	2019–21	Cartoon Network; France 4
Princess Fragrant	1	104		China	2015	
Princess Pring	2	39	Loco Entertainment; KTH; CJ ENM; Infinityone Comics Entertainment	South Korea	2015–16	KBS1
The Psammy Show	1	52	Method Animation; DQ Entertainment	France; Germany; India	2018–19	Disney Channel
Pucca (from Love Recipe)	1	26	Bazooka Studio	South Korea	2018–19	MBC TV
Pumpkin Reports	1	52	Motion Pictures; Young Jump Animation; Sample; TV3; Clan; Rai Fiction; Stretch Films (uncredited)	Italy; Malaysia; Spain	2015–16	Clan
Puppy Dog Pals	5	116	Wild Canary Animation	United States	2017–23	Disney Junior
Puteri	1	6	Les' Copaque Production	Malaysia	2014	TV3
Q Pootle 5	1	52	Snapper Productions; Blue Zoo	United Kingdom	2013–14	CBeebies
Quaid Say Baatein	2		Wakhra Studios	Pakistan	2013–present	Geo TV
Qumi-Qumi	3	21	Toonbox	Russia	2011–19	YouTube
Rabbids Invasion	4	104	Ubisoft Motion Pictures; TeamTO; France Télévisions	France; United States	2013–18	France 3 Nickelodeon / Nicktoons (2013–17)
Rafadan Tayfa	10	127	ISF Studios	Turkey	2014–present	TRT Çocuk
Rainbow Rangers (seasons 1–2)	3	62	Genius Brands; Telegael	United States; Ireland	2018–22	Nick Jr. Channel
Rainbow Ruby	2	52	38 °C Animation Studio; CJ E&M Corporation; Lotte Television; China Entertainment Corporation	South Korea; Canada; China	2016–20	Family Jr. EBS1; CCTV-14 (Mainland China); Qubo (United States); Netflix (Global); RTV (Indonesia)
Raketenflieger Timmi	3	33		Germany	2014–21	KiKA
Ranger Rob	3	66	Studio Liddell; Nelvana	Canada; United Kingdom	2016–21	Treehouse TV
Rated A for Awesome	1	26	Nerd Corps Entertainment	Canada	2011–12	YTV
Al-Rawi	1	30	ActPro; Quinced	Egypt	2014	
Ready Jet Go!	2	67	Wind Dancer Films; Snee-Oosh, Inc.	United States	2016–23	PBS Kids
ReBoot: The Guardian Code	2	20	Mainframe Studios; Reboot Productions; Corus Entertainment	Canada	2018	YTV; Netflix (International)
Regal Academy	2	52	Rainbow S.p.A. (Viacom); Rai Fiction	Italy	2016–18	Rai YoYo; Nickelodeon; Nick Jr.
Rev & Roll	1	52	DHX Studios; Alpha Group Co., Ltd.	Canada; China	2019–present	Family Jr.
Revisions	1	12	Shirogumi	Japan	2019	Fuji TV (+Ultra)
Ricky Zoom	2	52	Entertainment One; TeamTO; Youku Kids; Frog Box; Rai Ragazzi; Maga Animation Studio	France; Pakistan; United Kingdom; China; Italy	2019–21	Gulli; RAI; Youku Kids
Rimba Racer	2	26	Glue Studios	Malaysia	2014–19	TV9 (season 1); TV3 (season 2)
Rob the Robot	2	104	One Animation; Amberwood Entertainment	Canada; Singapore; United Kingdom	2010–13	TVOntario; Knowledge Network; Radio-Canada; Access
Robin Hood: Mischief in Sherwood	4	208	Method Animation; ZDF Enterprises; Fabrique D'Images (season 1); De Agostini Editore (season 1); DQ Entertainment (seasons 1–2); ON Kids & Family (seasons 2–3); KidsMe S.r.l. (season 3)	France; Germany; Luxembourg (season 1); India (seasons 1–2); Italy (seasons 1 and 3)	2015–present	TF1; Disney Channel (seasons 1–2); ZDF; DeA Kids (season 1); Pop (season 1)
Robocar Poli	5	120	RoiVisual; Educational Broadcasting System; Hyundai Motors; Benex Investment; Korea Creative Content Agency	South Korea	2011–22	EBS1
Robot and Monster	1	26	Smasho! Productions; LowBar Productions; Nickelodeon Animation Studio	United States	2012–15	Nickelodeon (2012–15); Nicktoons (2013–15); Noggin (app; 2015)
Robot Trains	2	84	CJ ENM; Bazooka Studio	South Korea	2015–19	SBS TV
Robotia	2		Malabar TV	Argentina	2017–20	Pakapaka
Robozuna	2	40	ITV Studios; KidsCave Entertainment	United Kingdom	2018–20	CITV
Rocket & Groot	1	12	Passion Animation Studios; Marvel Animation	United States	2017	Disney XD
The Rocketeer	1	22	Wild Canary Animation	United States	2019–20	Disney Junior
Roger	1	78	Je suis bien content	France	2019	France 4
Rolando Locomotov		140		Russia	2012	Carousel
Ronja, the Robber's Daughter	1	26	Polygon Pictures; Studio Ghibli	Japan	2014–15	NHK BSP
Rudra: Boom Chik Chik Boom		150	Green Gold Animations; Cosmos Entertainment Maya Digital Studios Hi-Tech Animation; Studio 56	India	2018–present	Nickelodeon
Ruff-Ruff, Tweet and Dave	2	104	Collingwood & Co. Sparky Animation	United Kingdom; Singapore	2015–17	CBeebies; Sprout
Running Man Animation	2	97		South Korea	2017–20	SBS TV
Rusty Rivets	3	78	Arc Productions; Jam Filled Toronto; Spin Master Entertainment	Canada	2016–20	Treehouse TV
RWBY	9	117	Rooster Teeth Animation	United States	2013–present	RoosterTeeth (2013–21); Crunchyroll (2023–present)
RWBY Chibi	4	74	Rooster Teeth Animation	United States	2016–21	RoosterTeeth
Sabrina: Secrets of a Teenage Witch	1	26	Splash Entertainment; MoonScoop; DSK Entertainment; Laughing Lion; Telegael Teoranta; Riverdale Productions	United States; France; Ireland; India	2013–14	Hub Network
Sadie Sparks	1	26	Brown Bag Films; Cyber Group Studios	Ireland; France	2019	Disney Channel
Sammy & Co	2	104		France	2014–17	M6
Sayed Android	1	30		Egypt	2016	
Secret Jouju	13			South Korea	2012–present	
Sendokai Champions	3	53	Kotoc Produccions; Televisión Española; Nottingham Forest	Spain	2013–present	Clan TVE (Spain); Cartoon Network (Latin America); YouTube (United States)
Seven & Me	2	52		France	2016	France 3
The Shadownsters	1	104	Hampa Animation Studio	Spain	2015	Ruutu+ (Finland)
Shan He She Ji Tu	1	20		China	2018–19	Bilibili iQIYI; Tencent Video; Youku
Shane the Chef	1	52		United Kingdom	2018–19	Channel 5
Sheikh Chilli & Friendz				India	2017	Discovery Kids
Shenbing Kids 2	1	52		China	2018	CCTV-14
Sherazade: The Untold Stories	1	26		Australia; Germany; India	2017	Network Ten
Sheriff Callie's Wild West	2	45	DHX Media Los Angeles (season 1); Wild Canary Animation (season 2)	United States	2014–17	Disney Junior
Sherwood	1	10	Giant Animation; Toybox Animation; Baby Octopus; YouTube Originals	United States; Ireland; New Zealand	2019	YouTube Premium
Shimajirō no Wow!		677	The Answer Studio	Japan	2012–present	TXN
Shimmer and Shine (from season 2)	4	86	Xentrix Studios; Nickelodeon Animation Studio	United States	2016–20	Nickelodeon (2016–18); Nick Jr. Channel (2018–20)
Shiva				India	2015–present	Nickelodeon; Nickelodeon Sonic
Shuke and Beita	4	104		China	2019–present	Tencent Video
Sick Bricks	1	40		United States	2015	YouTube
Silly Seasons	1	26	The Flying Circus	South Africa	2015–16	eToonz+
Sindbad & the 7 Galaxies	1	26	Creative Media Partners	United Kingdom	2016–20	
Skylanders Academy	3	38	TeamTO; Activision Blizzard Studios	United States	2016–18	Netflix
Slow Slow Sloth Neul	2	21		South Korea	2017–21	KBS2
Slugterra	6	63	Nerd Corps Entertainment (2012–14); DHX Media (2015–16)	Canada	2012–16	Family Channel; Disney XD/Family CHRGD
Snack World	1	50	OLM	Japan	2017–18	TXN
Snowsnaps	1	26	Carpediem Film & TV; Singing Frog Studio; Corus Entertainment; Technicolor Creative Services Montreal	Canada	2018	Télétoon / Treehouse TV
Socks	1	26	Keytoon Animation Studio	Germany; Spain	2013	KiKA
Sofia the First	4	113	Disney Television Animation	United States	2013–18	Disney Junior; Disney Channel
SofyRuby	2	104		South Korea	2016–18	EBS1 (season 1); SBS TV (season 2)
Sonic Boom	2	104	Technicolor Animation Productions; Lagardère Thématiques; Jeunesse TV; Sega of America, Inc.	United States; France	2014–17	Cartoon Network; Boomerang; Canal J Gulli
Die Sorgenfresser	1	14		Germany	2017–18	Nickelodeon
Space Dogs Family	2	104		Russia	2011–17	Russia-1
Space Racers	2	90	Stardust Animation (seasons 1–2); Maryland Public Television (season 1); WNET New York (season 2)	United States	2014–18	PBS Kids (season 1); Universal Kids (season 2)
Space Ranger Roger	1	24	DHX Media Halifax	Canada	2017	
Spin Fighters	1	30		China	2019	
Spirit Riding Free	12	99	DreamWorks Animation Television	United States	2017–20	Netflix
Splash and Bubbles	1	40	Herschend Studios; The Jim Henson Company	United States	2016–18	PBS; PBS Kids
Spookiz	4		Keyring; Bloomfield Studios	South Korea	2014–16	YouTube
Spot Bots	1	26	Spider Eye	United Kingdom	2016	CBeebies
Spy Kids: Mission Critical	2	20	Dimension Television	Canada; United States	2018	Netflix
Star Darlings	1	12		United States	2015–16	YouTube
Star Wars Rebels	4	75	Lucasfilm; Lucasfilm Animation	United States	2014–18	Disney XD
Star Wars Resistance	2	40	Lucasfilm; Lucasfilm Animation; Polygon Pictures; CGCG Inc.	United States	2018–20	Disney Channel; Disney XD
Stellar Transformation	5	80		China	2018–present	Tencent Video
The Stinky & Dirty Show	2	39	Amazon Studios; Brown Bag Films	United States; Ireland	2015–19	Amazon Prime Video
Stone Age: The Legendary Pet	2	26		South Korea	2017–18	KBS2
Stonyz	1	13		South Korea	2019–20	KBS1
StoryBots Super Songs	1	10	JibJab Bros. Studios	United States	2016	Netflix
Straight Title Robot Anime	1	12	Yaoyorozu	Japan	2013	Tokyo MX
Strawberry Shortcake's Berry Bitty Adventures	4	65	American Greetings	United States	2010–15	The Hub/Discovery Family
Suckers	1	104	BRB Internacional	Spain	2010	Disney XD (United States)
Sugar Skulls	1	10	Metacube Technology & Entertainment	Mexico	2018	Discovery Kids
Sunny Bunnies	9	227	Dlgital Light Studio (seasons 1–7); Animation Café (seasons 7 onwards)	Belarus; United Kingdom	2015–present	YouTube (part of season 2, season 3 onwards); Disney Channel (Russia); Channel 5
Super 4	2	104	Method Animation; Morgen Studios	France; Germany	2014–18	France 3 Cartoon Network (Italy)
Super Bheem			Green Gold Animations	India	2017	Pogo
Super BOOMi	1	52		China	2017	Tencent Video
Super Dinosaur	1	26	Spin Master Entertainment; Atomic Cartoons; Skybound Entertainment; Corus Entertainment	Canada; United States	2018–19	Teletoon
Super Monsters	3	22	Arad Animation (2017–18); ICON Creative Studio; 41 Entertainment	United States; Canada; United Kingdom	2017–19	Netflix
Super V	1	12	Star India; Cornerstone Animation; Baweja Movies	India	2019–20	Disney Channel; Marvel HQ; Star Sports; Star Plus; Disney+ Hotstar
Super Wings	9	364	FunnyFlux Entertainment; Qianqi Animation (season 1); Alpha Group (seasons 2–present); Little Airplane Productions (seasons 1–3); Educational Broadcasting System	South Korea; China; United States	2014–present	EBS syndicated (Mainland China); Universal Kids (seasons 1–4)
Superbook	5	68	Daysview Digital Image (Season 1–3); Toiion Animation Studios (Season 3–5); Xentrix Studios (Season 5)	United States; Japan	2011–21	Tokyo MX; CBN
Sydney Sailboat	2	52	Essential Media and Entertainment; Ideate Media; Telegael; Lemon Sky Studios; Shambles Communications	Australia	2015	ABC Kids; Sprout
Sylvanian Families Mini Episodes	4	48	Shogakukan Music and Digital Entertainment	Japan	2017–20	TV Tokyo (season 1); Tokyo MX (seasons 2–4)
Synostone	2	52		South Korea	2019–20	KBS1 (season 1); KBS2 (season 2)
T-Buster	2	46	Synergy Media	South Korea	2017–19	KBS1 (season 1); KBS2 (season 2)
T-Pang Rescue	2			China; South Korea	2010	KBS2 (South Korea); CCTV-6 (China)
T.O.T.S.	3	75	Titmouse, Inc. ICON Creative Studios	United States	2019–22	Disney Junior (2019–22); Disney Channel (2019–21)
T.R.EX.C.I	2	26		Brazil	2011–13	TV Rá-Tim-Bum
Taina and the Amazon's Guardians	1	26		Brazil	2018–19	Nickelodeon
Taka & Maka	1	40		France	2013	Antenne Réunion
Tales of Demons and Gods	6	328		China	2017–present	Tencent Video; Bilibili iQIYI; Mango TV
Tales of Tatonka	2	52	Cyber Group Studios	France	2010–11	TiJi; France 3 Piwi+
The Tales of Wonder Keepers	1	26	Wizart Animation; Henan York Animation Film Co., Ltd. Suzhou AoLa Animation Technology Co., Ltd.	China	2019–21	IQIYI
Talking Friends	1	10	Disney Interactive Media Group; Outfit7 Entertainment; Karactaz Animation	Slovenia; United States; New Zealand	2012	disney.com YouTube
Talking Tom & Friends	5	156	Outfit7; ARX Anima; People Moving Pixels	Slovenia; Austria; Spain; United States	2014–21	YouTube
Talking Tom Shorts	3	113	Outfit7	United States	2014–present	YouTube
Tarzan and Jane	2	13	Arad Animation; 41 Entertainment; Arc Productions	United States	2017–18	Netflix
Tashi	1	52	Flying Bark Productions; Telegael; Studio 100 Animation	Australia	2014–15	7TWO
Tayo the Little Bus	7	182	Iconix Entertainment; Educational Broadcasting System; Seoul Metropolitan Government	South Korea	2010–24	EBS; Disney Junior (Asia)
Tayo's Sing Along Show	2	26	Iconix Entertainment	South Korea	2013–15	EBS1
Team DroniX	1	26		France	2019–20	France 4
Teenage Mutant Ninja Turtles (2012)	5	124	Nickelodeon Animation Studio; LowBar Productions	United States	2012–17	Nickelodeon; Nicktoons (season 5)
Telemonster	1	52		South Korea	2016–17	MBC TV
Teletubbies	2	120	Wildbrain	United Kingdom	2015–18	YouTube
Tesagure! Bukatsu-mono	3	36	Yaoyorozu	Japan	2013–15	Nippon TV
Three Squirrels	1	52		China	2018	
Thunderbirds Are Go	3	78	ITV Studios; Pukeko Pictures; Weta Workshop	United Kingdom; New Zealand; Australia	2015–20	ITV (CITV)
Tickety Toc	4	59	The Foundation; FunnyFlux Entertainment	South Korea; United Kingdom	2012–16	EBS; Nick Jr. Channel; Channel 5
Tiddlytubbies	3	30	Wildbrain	United Kingdom	2018–20	YouTube
Tin & Tan	1	52		Colombia; Spain	2017–18	Señal Colombia (Colombia); Super3 (Spain)
Tina & Tony	3	156		Russia	2015–present	Moolt
Tinpo	1	78	Cloudco Entertainment; Dentsu; Sprite Animation Studios; OLM Digital	United Kingdom; Japan	2018–19	CBeebies; TV Tokyo
Tip the Mouse	3	104		Italy	2014–19	Rai Yoyo
Titipo Titipo	3	78	Iconix Entertainment	South Korea	2018–22	EBS
Tobot	19	392		South Korea	2010–16	JEI TV; Tooniverse
Tobot Athlon	3	29		South Korea	2016–17	Tooniverse; SBS TV
Tobot: Galaxy Detectives	3	152		South Korea	2018–21	KBS2 (seasons 1–2); Tooniverse (season 3)
Tomato Doppi	2			Uzbekistan	2018	Milliy TV
Tooned	5	30		United Kingdom	2012–16	Sky Sports F1
Top Wing	2	52	Industrial Brothers; 9 Story Media Group	Canada	2017–20	Treehouse TV
Toy Cop	2	52		South Korea	2017–18	KBS2
Traffic Safety with Poli	2	26		South Korea	2011–13	EBS1
Trains	3	128	AA Studio	Russia	2013–17	Russia-1
Transformers: Combiner Wars	1	8	Machinima, Inc. Hasbro Studios; Tatsunoko Production	United States; Japan	2016	go90
Transformers: Cyberverse	4	64	Boulder Media; Allspark Animation (seasons 1–3); Entertainment One (season 4)	United States; Ireland	2018–21	Cartoon Network (seasons 1–3); Netflix (season 4); YouTube
Transformers: Power of the Primes	1	10	Machinima, Inc. Hasbro Studios; Tatsunoko Production	United States; Japan	2018	go90 Tumblr (worldwide)
Transformers: Prime	3	65	Polygon Pictures; K/O Paper Products; Darby Pop Productions; Hasbro Studios	United States	2010–13	The Hub
Transformers: Titans Return	1	10	Machinima, Inc. Hasbro Studios; Tatsunoko Production	United States; Japan	2017–18	go90
Treasure Island	1	26		Italy	2016	Rai Gulp
Tree Fu Tom	5	72	FremantleMedia Kids & Family Entertainment; Blue-Zoo Productions; CBeebies	United Kingdom	2012–16	CBeebies
Treehouse Detectives	2	20	Saban Brands; ENPOP	United States; South Korea	2018	Netflix
Les Triplés	1	78		France; Luxembourg	2014–15	France 5
Trollhunters: Tales of Arcadia	3	52	DreamWorks Animation Television; Double Dare You Productions	United States	2016–18	Netflix
Tron: Uprising	1	19	Disney Television Animation; Polygon Pictures	United States	2012–13	Disney XD
Trucktown		40		Canada	2014–18	Treehouse TV
Trudes Tier	3	32		Germany	2014–22	Das Erste; KiKA
True and the Rainbow Kingdom	3	29	Home Plate Entertainment; Guru Studio	United States; Canada	2017–19	Netflix (worldwide); CBC Television
TukTakMan				South Korea	2017–present	EBS1; MBC TV
Tumble Tots Fun Adventures	1	11		United Kingdom	2016–19	Amazon Prime Video
Turbozaurs	4	104	Caramel & Co; Tale Wind Animation	Russia	2019–present	O!
Tutu	1	52		Cuba; Spain	2017	Clan
Uki	1	52		Belgium	2010	Club RTL; Ketnet
Ultraman	3	31	Production I.G; Sola Digital Arts	Japan	2019–23	Netflix
Vampirina	3	75	Brown Bag Films	United States; Ireland	2017–21	Disney Junior; Disney Channel
Vary Peri	1	40	Alpha Group Company; CJ E&M; InfinityOne Comics Entertainment; Huayi Brothers Media; Huayi Brothers Animation; Daewon Media; Dongwoo Animation; Korea Creative Content Agency; Union Investment Partners; Netmarble; SK Broadband; Tencent Penguin Pictures; China Media Capital	China; South Korea; Hong Kong	2012–13	JiaJia Kids; Golden Eagle Television; Tencent Video; TVB; Tooniverse; KBS1
VeggieTales in the City	2	26	Big Idea Entertainment; DreamWorks Animation Television (uncredited)	United States	2017	Netflix
VeggieTales in the House	4	52	Big Idea Entertainment; DreamWorks Animation Television	United States	2014–16	Netflix
The VeggieTales Show	1	26	Trilogy Animation Group; Prana Studios; 88 Pictures; Big Idea Entertainment	United States	2019–22	Trinity Broadcasting Network
Vic the Viking (2013)	2	78	ASE Studios Pty Limited; Studio 100 Animation; Flying Bark Productions	France; Germany; Austria; Netherlands; Australia	2013–14	TF1; ZDF; Network Ten (season 1); Eleven (season 2); ABC3
ViR: The Robot Boy	4	145	Maya Digital Studios	India	2013–present	Hungama TV
Virtual Guardians	1	26		South Korea	2019–20	KBS1
Wallykazam!	2	52	Nickelodeon Animation Studio	United States	2014–17	Nickelodeon (2014–16); Nick Jr. Channel (2016–17); Treehouse TV (Canada)
Watership Down	1	4	42; Biscuit Filmworks; BBC; Netflix	United Kingdom; Ireland; United States	2018	BBC One; Netflix (International)
Wendy	1	26	Wendy Productions Ltd. Red Kite Animation; ZDF Enterprises	Germany; United Kingdom	2013–14	Kabillion Girls Rule!
The Westward	5	70		China	2018–present	Tencent Video
What's the Big Idea?	1	52		France	2013	France 5
Where's Chicky?	4	208	Xilam; Cube Creative	France	2014–25	Canal J
The Wild Adventures of Blinky Bill	1	52	Flying Bark Productions; Telegael; Studio 100; Studio 100 Media; Giant Wheel Animation	Australia	2016–17	7TWO (formerly); ABC Me
Wild Animal Baby Explorers	3	52		United States	2010–14	PBS member stations
Wilson & Ditch: Digging America	2	21	The Jim Henson Company	United States	2010–12	PBS Kids
Wishenpoof!	2	39	Amazon Studios; DHX Studios Halifax; Out of the Blue Enterprises	United States; Canada	2014–19	Amazon Video
Wissper	2	104	Made 4 Entertainment; Absolutely CuckooTelegael; Discreet Art Productions; Bastei MediaWissper Limited	Germany; United Kingdom; Ireland	2015–19	Channel 5 Junior
Wonder Balls	2	52		South Korea	2014–19	EBS
Woodventures		104	Parovoz Animation Studio	Russia	2017–19	Tlum HD; Moolt
Wooser's Hand-to-Mouth Life	3	37	Sanzigen; Liden Films (season 2)	Japan	2012–15	TV Tokyo (seasons 1–2); Tokyo MX (season 3)
Word Party	5	60	The Jim Henson Company	United States	2016–21	Netflix; BabyFirst
Wu Geng Ji	4	156		China	2016–present	Tencent Video
Xia Lan	7	196		China	2012–18	CCTV-14
Xiaolin Chronicles	1	26	ActionFliks Media Corporation; Genao Productions	United States; France	2013–15	Gulli / Canal J Disney XD (episodes 1–20); Netflix (episodes 21–26); Cartoon Network Asia
Yo Yo	2	104		Italy	2017–20	Rai Yoyo
Yoko	3	78	Dibulitoon Studio; Somuga; Wizart Animation; Animiturri (English version); RTVE; EITB (season 2); Yoko Dibulitoon (season 2)	Russia; Spain	2016–20	Carousel; Clan/ETB 3
YooHoo to the Rescue	3	52	Aurora World; Mondo TV	South Korea; Italy	2019–20	Frisbee
Youths and Golden Coffin	3	84		China	2018–present	Bilibili iQIYI
Yup Yups	1	50	Radical Sheep Productions; Industrial Brothers	Canada	2013	Disney Junior
Zack & Quack	3	43	Zodiak Kids; Candy Bear; The Foundation; QQD Limited; High1 Entertainment	Israel; United Kingdom; South Korea	2014–17	Nick Jr.
Zafari	2	52	Zafari Holdings	Canada	2018–present	France Televisions; TiJi
Zak Storm	1	39	Sega of America; Method Animation; SAMG Entertainment; MNC Animation; SK Broadband; De Agostini Editore; Zagtoon; ON Kids & Family; Man of Action Studios	France; South Korea; United States; Indonesia; Italy	2016–18	Gulli; Canal J
ZellyGo	5	294		South Korea	2017–22	KBS2 (season 1); JEI TV (season 2); Cartoon Network (season 3)
Zombiedumb	3	164	Anyzac	South Korea	2015–present	KBS1; Disney Channel; Netflix
Zoobabu	1	104	BRB Internacional	Spain	2011	Canal Panda
Zoom the White Dolphin	3	156	Media Valley; Marzipan Film	France	2015–present	TF1
Zorro: The Chronicles	1	26	Cyber Group Studios	France	2015–16	France 3
Zou	3	156	Cyber Group Studios; Scrawl Studios	France; Singapore	2012–18	France 5 (formerly); Disney Junior; M6 (formerly); Télé-Québec; TiVi5 Monde; MBC (formerly)

== 2020s ==
Title	Season(s)	Episodes	Production	Country(ies)	Original Broadcast	Channel/network
The 3 Musketeers	1	52		France	2024–present	Okoo
7 Bears	1	10	Netflix Animation; Folivari	United States	2025	Netflix
123 Number Squad!	2	108	Omens Studios	Singapore	2022–24	Sky Kids; Channel 5
100% Wolf: Legend of the Moonstone	2	26	Flying Bark Productions; Studio 100 Media; Studio 56	Australia	2020–23	ABC ME
Abominable and the Invisible City	2	20	DreamWorks Animation Television	United States	2022–23	Peacock; Hulu
Action Pack	2	16	OddBot Animation	United States; Canada; United Kingdom	2022	Netflix
Ada Twist, Scientist	4	41	Netflix Animation; Brown Bag Films; Higher Ground Productions; Laughing Wild; Wonder Worldwide	United States	2021–23	Netflix
Agent 203	1	26	Toon 2 Tango; Mondo TV; V House Animation	Germany; Italy; North Macedonia	2024	Super RTL
Alice & Lewis	2	104		France	2020–23	TF1
Alice's Wonderland Bakery	2	50	Disney Television Animation	United States	2022–24	Disney Junior
Alien TV	2	26	Entertainment One; Pop Family Entertainment; Snowball Studios	Canada; Australia	2020–21	Netflix; 9Go!
The Amazing Digital Circus	1	9	Glitch Productions	Australia	2023–26	YouTube
Angry Birds Bubble Trouble	2	44	Rovio Animation	Finland	2020–23	YouTube
Angry Birds MakerSpace (from season 2)	3	35	Rovio Animation	Finland	2022–25	YouTube
Angry Birds Slingshot Space Stories	1	18	Rovio Entertainment	Finland	2025–present	YouTube
Angry Birds Slingshot Stories	4	75	Rovio Animation	Finland	2020–25	YouTube
Anna & Friends	1	78	Superprod Studio	France	2022–23	France 5 Nickelodeon
Arcane	2	18	Fortiche; Riot Games	United States	2021–24	Netflix
Ariel	2	56	Wild Canary Animation	United States	2024–present	Disney Jr.
Asterix and Obelix: The Big Fight	1	5	Netflix Animation Studios; Les Éditions Albert René; Légende Films; TAT Productions	France	2025	Netflix
Babble Bop!	2	13		United States	2021–23	Peacock
Baby Lemmings	1	78	Hari	France	2026–present	France 4
Bad Dinosaurs	1	8	Netflix Animation; Snafu Pictures	United States	2024	Netflix
The Bad Guys: The Series	2	19	DreamWorks Animation Television	United States	2025–present	Netflix
Barbie Mysteries	2	16	Mattel Television Studios; Kickstart Entertainment	United States; Canada	2024–25	Netflix
Barbie: A Touch of Magic	2	26	Mattel Television	United States	2023–24	Netflix
Barbie: It Takes Two	2	26	Mattel Television	United States	2022	Netflix
Barney's World	1	52	Nelvana; Mattel Television	United States	2024–25	HBO Max
Bastions	1	5	Thymos Media; Navel	South Korea	2023	SBS TV; Crunchyroll (streaming)
Battle Kitty	1	9	Netflix Animation; Layzell Bros.	United States; Australia	2022	Netflix
Batwheels	3	100	DC Entertainment; Warner Bros. Animation	United States	2022–present	Cartoon Network
Baymax!	1	6	Walt Disney Animation Studios	United States	2022	Disney+
Bea's Block	1	20	Sesame Workshop	United States; United Kingdom	2023–24	Sky Kids; Max
The Beachbuds	1	52	JToon Studios; Odin's Eye Animation	Canada; Indonesia; United States	2021	Disney+ Disney+ Hotstar; Discovery Kids (Latin America); ABC iview and ABC (Australia)
Bearbrick	1	13	DreamWorks Animation Television; Dentsu Entertainment	United States; Japan	2025	Apple TV+
BeddyByes	1	52	JAM Media	United Kingdom	2026–present	CBeebies; RTÉ KIDSjr; Disney Jr.
Belfort & Lupin	1	26	Ellipsanime Productions; Dargaud Media; Belvision Studios	France	2025	France 4 Okoo
BIg Lizard	1	52		United Kingdom	2024	CBeebies
Big Nate	2	52	John Cohen Productions; Nickelodeon Animation Studio	United States	2022–24	Paramount+
Big Tree City	1	15	Blue Zoo	United Kingdom	2022	Netflix
Bird's Eye View	1	8	Studio Local	New Zealand	2022	TVNZ
Blade Runner: Black Lotus	1	13	Alcon Television Group; Sola Digital Arts; Williams Street	Japan; United States	2021–22	Adult Swim; Crunchyroll
BooSnoo!	3	59		United Kingdom	2023–present	Sky Kids
Book Hungry Bears	1	52		Canada	2020	TVOKids
Boon and Pimento	1	30	Xilam; CrossRiver Productions	France	2020	YouTube
The Boss Baby: Back in the Crib	2	28	DreamWorks Animation Television	United States	2022–23	Netflix
Brown and Friends	1	18	Line Friends; Kickstart Entertainment	United States	2022	Netflix
Bubble's Hotel	1	52	Bron Studios; Creative Wealth Media	South Korea; China; Canada	2023	YouTube
Buddi	2	16	Frog Land Productions; GCI Film; Shanghai Motion Magic; Spider Eye Inc. Unanico	United Kingdom; China	2020	Netflix
Builder Brothers Dream Factory	1	24	Sinking Ship Entertainment; Corus Entertainment	Canada	2023	Treehouse TV
Bujji & Bhairava	1	2	Vyjayanthi Animation; Green Gold Animations	India	2024	Amazon Prime Video
Cabeon	1	52		South Korea	2023–24	KBS1
Cars on the Road	1	9	Pixar Animation Studios	United States	2022	Disney+
Catch! Teenieping	6	168	SAMG Entertainment	South Korea	2020–present	KBS2 (New TBC) (season 1); JEI TV (season 2–present)
Charlotte's Web	1	3	Guru Studio; Sesame Workshop	United States	2025	HBO Max
The Chicken Squad	1	29	Wild Canary Animation	United States	2021–22	Disney Junior
Chico Bon Bon: Monkey with a Tool Belt	4	38	Silvergate Media; Brown Bag Films	United Kingdom; Ireland	2020	Netflix
The Chosen Adventures	1	14	5&2 Studios; Amazon MGM Studios	United States	2025	Amazon Prime Video; Minno
Chums	3	36		Canada	2024–present	APTN
City of Ghosts	1	6	Netflix Animation; TeamTO	United States; France	2021	Netflix
Cocomelon Lane	7	24	Atomic Cartoons; Infinite Studios; Moonbug Entertainment	United States; Canada	2023–present	Netflix
Colourblocks	2	45	Blue Zoo; Alphablocks Ltd.	United Kingdom	2022–24	CBeebies
Core Sense	1	31		China	2020	Bilibili
The Creature Cases	7	59	TeamTO; Sony Pictures Television Kids; Tencent Video Productions (2022–23; 2025–present)	United States; France; China	2022–present	Netflix (worldwide); Tencent Video
The Croods: Family Tree	8	52	DreamWorks Animation Television	United States	2021–23	Hulu; Peacock
Curses!	2	20	DreamWorks Animation Television; Sunday Night Productions	United States	2023–24	Apple TV+
Daniel Spellbound	2	20	Netflix Animation; Boat Rocker Studios; Industrial Brothers	United States; Canada	2022–23	Netflix
Dee & Friends in Oz	2	17	Brown Bag Films; 9 Story Media Group	United States	2024	Netflix
Deepa & Anoop	2	18	Mattel Television; Kickstart Entertainment	United States	2022	Netflix
Deer Squad	4	80	Beijing iQIYI Science & Technology Co., Ltd.	China	2020–present	iQIYI; Nickelodeon (worldwide)
Dew Drop Diaries	2	40	DreamWorks Animation Television; TeamTO	United States	2023	Netflix
Dino Pops	1	13	Mobius Lab Kids	United States	2023	Peacock
Dino Ranch	3	65	Industrial Brothers; Boat Rocker Studios; Jam Filled Entertainment	Canada	2021–24	CBC Kids
Dino Ranch: Island Explorers	1	26	Industrial Brothers; Boat Rocker Studios	Canada	2025–present	CBC Kids; Ici Radio-Canada Télé; Cartoonito
Do, Re & Mi	1	26	Michael Made Me; Gaumont Animation; Amazon Studios	France; United States	2021–22	Amazon Prime Video
Dog Days Out	1	8	Million Volt Animation Studios; CJ ENM	South Korea	2025	Netflix
Dogmatix and the Indomitables	1	52		France	2021	M6
Doozie's Doghouse	1	7	DreamWorks Animation Television	United States	2026–present	Netflix
Dora	4	104	Little Coop; Walsh Valdés Productions; Pipeline Studios; Nickelodeon Animation Studio	United States; Canada	2024–present	Paramount+
Doug Unplugs	2	26	DreamWorks Animation Television	United States	2020–22	Apple TV+
Dr. Seuss's Horton!	2	13	Netflix Animation; Dr. Seuss Enterprises; Brown Bag Films	United States	2025–present	Netflix
Dream Productions	1	4	Pixar Animation Studios	United States	2024	Disney+
DreamWorks Dragons: The Nine Realms	5	32	DreamWorks Animation Television	United States	2021–23	Hulu; Peacock
Drifting Dragons	1	12	Polygon Pictures	Japan	2020	Fuji TV (+Ultra); Netflix
Dug Days	1	6	Pixar Animation Studios	United States	2021–23	Disney+
Dylan's Playtime Adventures	1	52	Brown Bag Films; Scholastic Entertainment	United States	2024–present	Cartoonito; CBC Kids
Eddie's Lil' Homies	1	10		Australia	2024	NITV
Edmond and Lucy	1	52	MIAM ! Animation	France	2022	France 5
Eden	1	4	CGCG Studio Inc. Qubic Pictures	Japan	2021	Netflix
The Enchanted Village of Pinocchio	1	26	Method Animation; Palomar; Rai Ragazzi; ZDF Studios	France	2022	M6; France 5
Eureka!	1	30	Brown Bag Films	United States	2022–23	Disney Junior
Eva the Owlet	2	17	Brown Bag Films; Scholastic Entertainment	United States	2023–25	Apple TV+
Eyes of Wakanda	1	4	Marvel Studios Animation; Proximity Media	United States	2025	Disney+
The Fairly OddParents: A New Wish	1	20	FredFilms; Billionfold Inc. Nickelodeon Animation Studio	United States	2024	Nickelodeon; Netflix (international)
Fia's Fairies	1	26		Ireland	2022–present	RTÉjr
Firebuds	3	60	Electric Emu Productions; Disney Television Animation	United States	2022–25	Disney Jr.
FriendZSpace	1	52	Shellhut Entertainment; T&B Media; Flying Bark Productions; Studio 100 Media	Australia; Belgium; United States	2022	ABC Me
Gabby's Dollhouse	14	90	DreamWorks Animation Television	United States	2021–present	Netflix
Get Rolling with Otis	2	18	9 Story Media Group; Brown Bag Films	United States	2021–22	Apple TV+
Ghee Happy	1	52		United States; India	2023–present	YouTube
Ghost in the Shell: SAC_2045	2	24	Production I.G; Sola Digital Arts	Japan	2020–22	Netflix
Ghostforce	2	52	Method Animation; SAMG Animation; Zagtoon; Kidsme S.R.L	France; South Korea; Italy	2021–present	TFOU; EBS 1 (season 1); Disney Channel (season 1); Netflix (season 2)
Ginger and the Vegesaurs	2	40	Cheeky Little Media	Australia	2022	ABC Kids
Glowbies	3	36		Canada	2021–22	CBC Kids
Go Go Bus	13	316		China	2020–present	CCTV-14
Go, Dog, Go!	4	40	DreamWorks Animation Television; WildBrain Studios	United States; Canada	2021–23	Netflix
Go! Go! Cory Carson	6	63	Kuku Studios; Superprod Studio; Tonko House; Wilmer Sound	United States; France	2020–21	Netflix
Gremlins: Secrets of the Mogwai	2	20	Amblin Television; Warner Bros. Animation	United States	2023–25	Max
Gudetama: An Eggcellent Adventure	1	10		Japan	2022	Netflix
Gus, the Itsy Bitsy Knight	2	104		France	2021–24	TF1
Hanni and the Wild Woods	1	52		South Korea	2020–present	SBS
He-Man and the Masters of the Universe (2021)	3	26	Mattel Television	United States	2021–22	Netflix
Hello Kitty: Super Style!	12	52	Watch Next Media; Monello Productions	Italy; France	2022–24	Amazon Prime Video; Canal+ Kids; Rai Yoyo
Henrietta	1	52		Germany	2020	KiKa
Hero Inside	2	16	CJ ENM; Million Volt Animation Studios; Ygg Global; Tencent Video Productions	South Korea; China; Thailand	2023–24	HBO Max
Hop and Zip	2	16		South Korea; China; Thailand	2023–24	YouTube
Hot Wheels Let's Race	3	20	Mattel Television; Sprite Animation Studios; OLM Digital	United States	2024–25	Netflix
I Am Groot	2	10	Marvel Studios Animation	United States	2022–23	Disney+
I'll Get You! Holidays	4	91		Russia	2021–present	Karusel
Ice Age: Scrat Tales	1	6	Blue Sky Studios; 20th Century Animation	United States	2022	Disney+
IN:APP	1	52	Anyzac	South Korea	2020	KBS1
Interstellar Ella	1	31	Aardman; Fabrique Fantastique; Apartment 11 Productions	Canada	2022–present	Ketnet
Iron Man and His Awesome Friends	1	37	Marvel Studios Animation; Atomic Cartoons	United States; Canada	2025–present	Disney Jr.
It's Andrew	1	40	Pirate Size Productions; Infinite Studios; Mainframe Studios	Australia; Canada	2025–present	ABC Kids; CBC Kids
Iwájú	1	6	Cinesite; Walt Disney Animation Studios; Kugali Media	United Kingdom; United States; Nigeria	2024	Disney+
Jade Armor	2	26	TeamTO	France	2022–present	Cartoon Network (EMEA); France 4 Super RTL (Germany)
Jungle Box	1	100	Animation Studio 38℃ Doong Studio	South Korea	2021	Tooniverse
Jurassic World Camp Cretaceous	5	49	Universal Pictures; DreamWorks Animation Television; Amblin Entertainment	United States	2020–22	Netflix
Jurassic World: Chaos Theory	4	39	Universal Pictures; DreamWorks Animation Television; Amblin Entertainment	United States	2024–25	Netflix
Kamp Koral: SpongeBob's Under Years	2	39	United Plankton Pictures, Inc. Nickelodeon Animation Studio	United States	2021–24	Paramount+
Kangaroo Beach	3	72	Cheeky Little Media; Siamese (season 3)	Australia	2021–present	ABC Kids
Karate Sheep	2	26	Xilam	France	2023	Netflix
Karma's World	4	40	Karma's World Entertainment; Brown Bag Films; 9 Story Media Group	Canada; Ireland; Indonesia; United States	2021–22	Netflix
Kindergarten: The Musical	1	25	Oddbot Animation	United States	2024–25	Disney Jr.
Kiya & the Kimoja Heroes	1	26	Triggerfish Animation Studios; Entertainment One; Frog Box Productions; TeamTO; Disney Branded Television	South Africa; Canada; France	2023–24	Disney Jr. France 4
Killer Bean	1	2	Jeff Lew Productions LLC; Killer Bean Studios LLC	United States	2020	YouTube
Kitti Katz	1	10	KidsCave Studios	United States	2023	Netflix
Komi Witch Lara	2	52		South Korea	2023	Tooniverse
Kung Fu Panda: The Dragon Knight	3	42	DreamWorks Animation Television	United States	2022–23	Netflix
Lego Friends: Heartlake Stories	1	4		United States	2022	YouTube
Lego Friends: The Next Chapter	3	41	Passion Pictures; Superprod Animation	Denmark; France	2023–present	YouTube
Lego One Piece	1	2	The Lego Group; Shueisha; Atomic Cartoons	United States	2026	Netflix
Lego Pixar: BrickToons	1	5	The Lego Group; Pixar Animation Studios; Atomic Cartoons	United States	2024	Disney+
Let's Go, Cozy Coupe		70		United Kingdom	2020–present	YouTube
Lil Wild	3	56		Singapore	2020–23	Channel 5
Lil' Stompers	1	13	IoM	United States	2023–24	Peacock
Little Baby Bum: Music Time	1	9	Moonbug Entertainment	United States	2023	Netflix
Little Dreamer Gguda	2	26		South Korea	2022–23	KBS1
Lloyd of the Flies	1	52	Aardman Animations	United Kingdom	2022–present	CITV; ZDF
Lucas the Spider	1	77	Wexworks Media; Fresh TV Inc.	Canada	2021–22	Family Channel
Maca & Roni (seasons 1–2)	4	179	Brick Studio	South Korea	2021–present	Tooniverse; KBS1; Cartoon Network
Madagascar: A Little Wild	8	50	DreamWorks Animation Television; Mainframe Studios	United States	2020–22	Hulu; Peacock
Magicampers	1	22	Mikros Animation; ObieCo	United States	2026–present	Disney Jr.
The Marsupilamis	1	52	Ellipse Animation; Belvision; Mediatoon Distribution	France; Belgium	2026–present	Nickelodeon
Marvel Zombies	1	4	Marvel Studios Animation	United States	2025	Disney+
Max & the Midknights	2	11	Jane Startz Productions; Nickelodeon Animation Studio	United States	2024–present	Nickelodeon (season 1); Nicktoons (season 2)
Maya and the Three	1	9	Netflix Animation; Mexopolis	United States; Mexico	2021	Netflix
Mech Cadets	1	10	Netflix Animation; Boom! Studios; Polygon Pictures	United States	2023	Netflix
MechWest	1	4	AnimSchool Studios	United States	2024–present	YouTube; Angel Studios
Mecha Builders	1	26	Sesame Workshop; Guru Studio	United States; Canada	2022–23	Cartoon Network (Cartoonito)
Mechamato	4	52	Animonsta Studios	Malaysia	2021–present	TV3; TV9; Cartoon Network; Netflix; Astro Prima
Megamind Rules!	1	8	DreamWorks Animation Television	United States	2024	Peacock
Mermaid Magic	1	10	Netflix Animation; Rainbow SPA	United States	2024	Netflix
Mia & Codie	2	40	Epic Story Media	Canada	2024–present	TVOKids
Mia's Magic Playground	2	24	Moonbug Entertainment; NENT Group	Norway; United Kingdom	2020–23	Viaplay; YouTube
Mickey Mouse Clubhouse+	2	40	Disney Television Animation	United States	2025–present	Disney Jr. Disney+
Mickey Mouse Funhouse	3	86	Disney Television Animation	United States	2021–25	Disney Jr.
Miffy & Friends	1	78	StudioCanal; Superprod Animation; Mercis BV	Netherlands; France	2025–present	Canal+ Kids; NPO Zappelin
Mighty Express	7	44	Spin Master Entertainment; Atomic Cartoons	Canada	2020–22	Netflix
Mighty MonsterWheelies	2	52	DreamWorks Animation Television; Universal Television	United States	2024–25	Netflix
Millie Magnificent	1	52	Nelvana; Corus Entertainment	Canada	2026–present	Treehouse TV
Mini Smiley	1	78		France	2024–present	Ici TOU.TV
Minibods	1	39	Moonbug	United States	2023–24	YouTube
Miniheroes of the Forest	1	52	Zodiak Kids & Family France	France; Italy	2024	France 5 Rai Yoyo
Mira, Royal Detective	2	54	Wild Canary Animation	United States	2020–22	Disney Channel; Disney Junior; DisneyNow (Season 2)
Modo Challenge	1	52	Blue Spirit	France	2024	TF1
Mojo Swoptops	1	52	Blue Zoo Animation Studio; Tararaboom	United Kingdom	2024–present	CBeebies
Moley	1	52	Nottage Productions	United Kingdom	2021–22	Boomerang
Momonsters	1	52		Spain	2020–present	Clan TV
Mondo Yan	1	52		Spain; Ireland	2020–present	TV3
Monster High	2	46	Mattel Television; Nickelodeon Animation Studio	United States	2022–24	Nickelodeon
Monsters at Work	2	20	Disney Television Animation	United States	2021–24	Disney+ (season 1); Disney Channel (season 2)
Mr. Crocodile	1	39	Method Animation	France	2025–present	Nickelodeon
Mumfie	1	78	Zodiak Kids & Family France	France; Italy	2022	Rai Yoyo; France 5
Mush-Mush & the Mushables	1	50		France	2020–21	RTS 1
My Color Friends		28		United States	2020	BabyFirst
My Dad the Bounty Hunter	2	19	Netflix Animation; Dwarf Animation Studio	United States	2023	Netflix
My Little Pony: Make Your Mark	6	27	Entertainment One; Atomic Cartoons	United States; Canada	2022–23	Netflix
Mystery Lane	1	26	Hari	France	2022–present	Disney Channel
Nefertine on the Nile	1	52		Italy	2021	Rai Yoyo
New Keluarga Somat	1	26		Indonesia	2026–present	Mentari TV
Ninjago: Dragons Rising	3	60	WildBrain Studios; The Lego Group	United States; Denmark	2023–present	Netflix
Not Quite Narwhal	2	39	DreamWorks Animation Television	United States	2023–24	Netflix
Numberville	2	28	Pitchipoy Animation Studios	Israel	2020–21	Kan Educational
Obki	2	30		United Kingdom	2021–22	Sky Kids
Octonauts: Above & Beyond	6	78	Mainframe Studios; Sony Pictures Television Kids	United Kingdom; Canada	2021–present	Netflix
Oggy Oggy	3	52	Xilam	France	2021–23	Netflix; Okoo
Oh My Lallan				India	2023	Sony YAY!
Oko Lele Chibi	1	6		United States	2026–present	YouTube
Oko Lele Horror Adventure	1			United States	2025–present	YouTube
Olly	1	7		United States	2025–present	BabyTV
Oni: Thunder God's Tale	1	4	Tonko House; Netflix Animation	United States	2022	Netflix
The Pandavas				India	2022	Pogo
Paris & Pups	1	4		United States	2025	YouTube
Petronix Defenders	2	52	Method Animation; Palomar; Rai Ragazzi; ZDF Studios	France	2022	M6; Gulli; Super RTL
Pfffirates	1	52	Xilam	France	2022	TFOU
Pif & Hercule Go Green	1	26		France	2026–present	Canal+ Kids
Piggy Builders	1	26	Xilam	France	2025–present	France 5 CBeebies (United Kingdom); Kika (Germany)
Pinaki & Happy - The Bhoot Bandhus			Tavrohi Animations Private Limited	India	2020	Nickelodeon Sonic
Pinocchio and Friends	1		Rainbow S.p.A. Rai Kids; Toonz Media Group	Italy	2021–24	Rai Yoyo
Pip and Posy	1		Magic Light Pictures; Blue Zoo Animation Studio	United Kingdom	2021	Milkshake!
Pixar Popcorn	1	10	Pixar Animation Studios	United States	2021	Disney+
Pop Paper City	1	18		United Kingdom	2022–present	Milkshake!
Press Start!	1	6	Cyber Group Studios	United States	2024	Peacock
Presto! School of Magic	1	26	TeamTO; Federation Kids & Family	France	2021–present	Discovery Kids
Pretzel and the Puppies	2	18	HarperCollins Productions; House of Cool; Saturday Animation Studio	United States; Canada	2022–23	Apple TV+
Princess Power	3	45	Flower Films; Atomic Cartoons	United States; Canada	2023–24	Netflix
Puffins	1	250	Iervolino Entertainment	United States	2020	Apple TV+
Puppies and Kittens	1	21		Russia	2020–present	Karusel
Pupstruction	3	74	Titmouse, Inc.	United States	2023–present	Disney Jr.
Quantum Heroes Dinoster	3	78		South Korea	2023–present	EBS
Rainbow Bubblegem	2	52		South Korea	2023–present	EBS
Ready Eddie Go!	2	52	Hocus Pocus Studio	United Kingdom	2023–present	Sky Kids
A Record of Mortal's Journey to Immortality	4	168		China	2020–present	Bilibili
Remy & Boo	1	26	Industrial Brothers; Boat Rocker Studios	Canada	2020	Universal Kids
Resident Evil: Infinite Darkness	1	4	Quebico; TMS Entertainment	Japan	2021	Netflix
Ridley Jones	5	35	Netflix Animation; Brown Bag Films; Laughing Wild	United States; Ireland	2021–23	Netflix
Ringing Fate	1	12		China	2023	Bilibili
Roberta quiere cacao	1	11		Colombia	2025–present	Caracol Televisión
RoboGobo	2	50	Brown Bag Films	United States; Ireland	2025–present	Disney Jr.
RoBOTIK	1	31		Canada	2022	CBC Kids
Rockoons	1	52		Russia	2021–present	Karusel
Roro Aur Hero Bhoot Mast Zabardast				India	2022	Gubbare
Rubble & Crew	5	83	Spin Master Entertainment; Corus Entertainment	Canada	2023–present	Treehouse TV
Rugrats (2021)	3	64	Klasky Csupo; Nickelodeon Animation Studio	United States	2021–24	Paramount+ (2021–23); Nicktoons (2024); Nickelodeon Global Unlimited (2026)
Run Monster Run	1	8		United States	2026–present	YouTube
S.M.A.S.H.!	1	52	Assemblage Entertainment	Germany	2022	Super RTL; HBO Max
Sakura Wars: The Animation	1	12	Sanzigen	Japan	2020	Tokyo MX; BS11
Samurai Rabbit: The Usagi Chronicles	2	20	Netflix Animation; Atomic Monster; Dark Horse Entertainment; Gaumont Animation	United States; France	2022	Netflix
Santiago of the Seas	2	48	Walsh Valdés Productions (season 1); Nickelodeon Animation Studio	United States	2020–23	Nickelodeon (2020–23); Nick Jr. (2023)
Sausage Party: Foodtopia	2	16	Amazon MGM Studios; Sony Pictures Television; Annapurna Television; Point Grey Pictures; Shaffirwhich	United States	2024–present	Amazon Prime Video
Secret Level	1	15	Blur Studio; Amazon MGM Studios	United States	2024–present	Amazon Prime Video
Sharkdog	3	22	One Animation; Nickelodeon Productions	United States; Singapore	2021–23	Netflix
Shasha & Milo	1	25	Kocca; Gicon	South Korea	2023–24	EBS; Pop (United Kingdom)
Sissi: The Young Empress (season 3)	1	26		Italy	2020	Cartoonito
The Smurfs (2021)	3	156	Dupuis Edition & Audiovisuel; Peyo Productions; Dargaud Media (season 1); Les Cartooneurs Associés (season 2); Ellipsanime Productions (seasons 3–present)	Belgium; France; Germany	2021–present	La Trois (2021–present); TF1 (2021–present); Ketnet (2021–present); Kika (2022–present)
Sofia the First: Royal Magic	1	14	Disney Television Animation; Electric Emu Productions	United States	2026–present	Disney Jr.
Sonic Prime	3	23	Netflix Animation; Sega of America; WildBrain Studios; Man of Action Entertainment	United States	2022–24	Netflix
Spicy Spacey	1	20	Metal Brain Studio	United States	2023–present	YouTube
Spidey and His Amazing Friends	5	113	Marvel Animation (season 1); Marvel Studios Animation (season 2–present)	United States; Canada	2021–present	Disney Jr.
Spirit Rangers	3	39	Netflix Animation; Laughing Wild; Superprod Studio	United States	2022–24	Netflix
Stan & Gran	1	52		United Kingdom	2025	Milkshake!
Star Trek: Prodigy	2	40	Secret Hideout; Roddenberry Entertainment; Brothers Hageman Productions; Nickelodeon Animation Studio; CBS Eye Animation Productions	United States	2021–24	Paramount+ (2021–22); Netflix (2024)
Star Wars Tales	3	18	Lucasfilm; Lucasfilm Animation	United States	2022–25	Disney+
Star Wars: Maul – Shadow Lord	2	10	Lucasfilm; Lucasfilm Animation	United States	2026–present	Disney+
Star Wars: The Bad Batch	3	47	Lucasfilm; Lucasfilm Animation	United States	2021–24	Disney+
Star Wars: Young Jedi Adventures	3	55	Lucasfilm; Lucasfilm Animation; Wild Canary Animation	United States	2023–25	Disney+ Disney Jr.
StarBeam	4	33	Kickstart Productions	Canada	2020–21	Netflix
Stillwater	5	40	Scholastic Entertainment; Gaumont Animation	United States; France	2020–26	Apple TV+
Stop the Gods	2	30		China	2024–present	Tencent Video
Stranger Things: Tales from '85	2	18	Netflix Animation Studios; Upside Down Pictures; 21 Laps Entertainment	United States	2026–present	Netflix
Summer & Todd: Happy Farmers	1	52		Italy	2021–present	Rai Yoyo
Supa Team 4	2	16	Triggerfish Animation Studios; Cake Entertainment; Superprod Studio	South Africa; United States	2023	Netflix
Super Giant Robot Brothers	1	10	Netflix Animation; Reel FX Creative Studios	United States	2022	Netflix
SuperKitties	3	74	Sony Pictures Television Kids	United States; Canada	2023–present	Disney Jr.
Supernatural Academy	1	16	ICON Creative Studio; 41 Entertainment	United States	2022	Peacock
A Tale Dark & Grimm	1	10	Netflix Animation; Boat Rocker Studios; Novo Media Group; Astro-Nomical Entertainment	United States; Canada	2021	Netflix
Tales From Outer Suburbia	1	10	Flying Bark Productions; Siamese; Highly Spirited	Australia	2026–present	ABC iview BYUtv (United States)
Tangranimals	1	52	Xilam; Cube Creative	France	2021	France 5
Tea Town Teddy Bears	1	13	M2 Animation	United States	2024	Peacock
Team Mekbots Animal Rescue	2	21	M2 Animation	United States	2025–present	Peacock
Team Zenko Go	2	22	DreamWorks Animation Television; Mainframe Studios	United States; Canada	2022	Netflix
Teletubbies:Let's Go	1	52	Wildbrain	United Kingdom	2022–23	YouTube
That's Joey!	1	52		France	2020–present	M6
Tiddlytubbies	1	20	Wildbrain	United Kingdom	2021	YouTube
Timbalo	1	10	Bert Smets Productions	Belgium	2025–present	Ketnet Junior
Time Traveler Luke	1	52	Anyzac	South Korea; Malaysia	2020–21	KBS1; TVS; Disney Channel; Astro NJOI
Tish Tash Singalong Series	1	13		South Korea	2025–present	EBS
Toad & Friends	1	52		United Kingdom	2023	HBO Max
Transformers: EarthSpark	4	46	Entertainment One (season 1); Hasbro Entertainment (seasons 2–4); Nickelodeon Animation Studio (seasons 2–4)	Canada (Season 1); United States (seasons 2–4)	2022–25	Nickelodeon; Paramount+
Transformers: War for Cybertron Trilogy	3	18	Rooster Teeth Studios; Polygon Pictures; Allspark Animation (Siege); Entertainment One (Earthrise and Kingdom)	United States; Japan	2020–21	Netflix
Trash Truck	2	28	Netflix Animation; Glen Keane Productions	United States	2020–21	Netflix
Underdog and the Canine Defenders	1			France	2025–present	M6; Gulli
Unicorn Academy	4	21	Spin Master Entertainment	United States	2023–25	Netflix
Unicorn Academy: Secrets Revealed	2	14	Spin Master Entertainment	United States	2026–present	Netflix
Weather Hunters	1	40	Al Roker Entertainment; Silver Creek Falls Entertainment	United States	2025–present	PBS Kids
Weird Waters	2	47	Wayletta Productions LLC; Meticulous Media; Moondog Animation Studios; 9 Story Media Group	Canada	2022–23	Tubi
The Weasy Family	1	78	Hari	France	2025	Télé-Québec
Win or Lose	1	8	Pixar Animation Studios	United States	2025	Disney+
Winx Club: The Magic Is Back	1	13	Rainbow; Rai Kids	Italy	2025–present	Rai 2 Rai Yoyo; RaiPlay (on-demand)
Witch Detectives	1	26	Method Animation; Toonz Entertainment; Entourage Media; Telegael	France	2026–present	TF1; Super RTL
Wizards: Tales of Arcadia	1	10	DreamWorks Animation Television; Double Dare You Productions	United States	2020	Netflix
Wolf King	2	16	Netflix Animation; Jellyfish Pictures; Lime Pictures	United Kingdom; United States	2025	Netflix
Wonderblocks	1	30	Blue Zoo; Alphablocks Ltd	United Kingdom	2025–present	CBeebies
Wonderoos	2	39	7 Ate 9 Entertainment; Atomic Cartoons	United States	2024	Netflix
WondLa	3	20	Skydance Animation; Gotham Group	United States	2024–25	Apple TV+
Woof and Joy	1	47	Karandash Animation Studio; Fabaap	United States	2024	Yippee TV
Zombies: The Re-Animated Series	1	20	Disney Television Animation	United States; Canada	2024	Disney Channel; Disney+
Zoobees	1			India; United States	2020–present	YouTube
Zoonicorn	1	25		Canada	2022	Sky Kids
Zootopia+	1	6	Walt Disney Animation Studios	United States	2022	Disney+
Zyra and the Unicorn (from season 2)	2	7		United States	2023–present	YouTube

== Upcoming ==
Title	Production	Country(ies)	Release date	Channel/network
Action Rabbits	Blue Spirit; Milkcow Media; Atomic Cartoons	France	TBA	TF1
Astro Boy Reboot	Method Animation; Tezuka Productions; Shibuya Productions; ZDF Studios	France	2027	TF1; ZDF
Avengers: Mightiest Friends	Marvel Studios Animation; Atomic Cartoons	United States	2027	Disney Jr.
Bin Buddies	Millimages	France	TBA	TBA
Bro Quest	Revelator Studio	Ireland	TBA	TBA
Cars: Lightning Racers	Pixar Animation Studios; Disney Television Animation; ICON Creative Studio	United States	2027	Disney Jr.
Chickies	Xilam	France	2027	TBA
Dragon Girls	9 Story Media Group; Brown Bag Films	Canada	TBA	TBA
Earthworm Jim: Beyond the Groovy	Interplay Entertainment	United States	TBA	TBA
Elle(s)	GO-N Productions	France	TBA	TBA
Flower & Flour		Australia; Canada	2026	TVOKids
Ghostbusters: Night Shift	Sony Pictures Animation; Netflix Animation Studios; Ghost Corps	United States	2027	Netflix
Gilbert	Gaumont Animation	France	2027	TBA
HexVets and Magic Pets	Nickelodeon Animation Studio; Boom! Studios	United States	2026	Paramount+
Holly & Luna Go Woof!	MITS PROD	Belgium; France	TBA	TBA
Juno the Jellyfish	9 Story Media Group; Crayola Studios; Brown Bag Films	United States	TBA	TBA
Leela's Island	Nelvana; Time Studios	Canada	TBA	Treehouse TV
Littlest Robot	Toon2Tango; V House Animation	France	TBA	TBA
Messi and the Giants	Sony Pictures Television Kids; Leo Messi Management; Sony Music Vision; Atlantis Animation	United States	2027	Disney Channel
Mi Bi Pi & the Dinos	Mr Loyal	France	TBA	TBA
Motel Transylvania	Sony Pictures Animation	United States	2027	Netflix
Surf's Up: The Series	Sony Pictures Animation; Atomic Cartoons	United States	TBA	TBA
SuperBikes	Beta Film	Germany	TBA	TBA
Taïtikis Guardians of the Oceans	Method Animation	France	TBA	TBA
Tales of the Mirru: Vet Explorers	Method Animation; Good Hero	France	TBA	TBA
Toto the Ninja Cat	Superprod Group; StudioCanal Television; StudioCanal Stories	France	TBA	TBA
Vet Academy	Superprod Group; Red Monk Studio	France	TBA	TBA
Wadoo	Method Animation; El Reino Infantil	France	TBA	TBA
What's Up Eesha?	TeamTO; Dandelooo	France	TBA	TBA

== See also ==
- List of computer-animated films
