= List of Zack & Quack episodes =

Zack & Quack is a CGI-animated children's television series created by Gili Dolev and Yvette Kaplan. The series is produced by Zodiak Media. Set inside a pop-up book, the show follows the adventures of a 7-year-old boy Zack and his best friend, Quack. The series premiered on the Nick Jr. Channel and Milkshake! in the United Kingdom and Ireland on February 7, 2014. In the United States, it began airing on April 5, 2014. In February 2017, the show ended completely.

== Series overview ==
Season	Segments	Episodes	Originally released	
Season	Segments	Episodes	First released	Last released
1	20	10	February 7, 2014	April 11, 2014
2	32	16	June 27, 2014	October 10, 2014
3	14	7	May 23, 2016	February 5, 2017

== Episodes ==
=== Season 1 (2014) ===
No. overall	No. in season	Title	Original release date
1	1	"Pop-Up Express" / "Zack & Quack's Pop-Up Circus"	February 7, 2014
2	2	"Pop-Along Cowboy" / "The Poppy-Up Flower"	February 14, 2014
3	3	"Super Popper" / "Pop-Up Speedway"	February 21, 2014
4	4	"Zack's Christmas Letter" / "The Popped Balloon"	February 28, 2014
5	5	"Pop-Up Snowman" / "Pop-Up Moon Mission"	March 7, 2014
6	6	"The Legend of Prince Pop" / "Pop-Up Monster"	March 14, 2014
7	7	"Pop-Up Pumpkin Patch" / "Pop-Up Ball Hero"	March 21, 2014
8	8	"Up Popped a Spider" / "Popping Hopping Hiccups"	March 28, 2014
9	9	"Pop-Up Pond Pet" / "Pop Idols"	April 4, 2014
10	10	"The Knights of Pop-A-Lot" / "The Poparang 3000"	April 11, 2014

=== Season 2 (2014) ===
No. overall	No. in season	Title	Original release date
11	1	"Quack's Birthday Bash" / "Pop-N-Seek Ninjas"	June 27, 2014
12	2	"Pop-Up Kite Contest" / "Pop-Up Duck Vacation"	July 4, 2014
13	3	"Pop-Up Mystery" / "The Best Pop-up Picnic Ever"	July 11, 2014
14	4	"Pop-A-Saurus Rex" / "Pop to the Top"	July 18, 2014
15	5	"Pop-Up Tree House" / "A Poptastic Dance for Two"	July 25, 2014
16	6	"The Great Pop-Up Ice Race" / "Not So Itty Bitty Pop-Up Kitty"	August 1, 2014
17	7	"Don't Pop-Up the Pirates" / "The Pop-Up Games"	August 8, 2014
18	8	"Pop Art Festival" / "Pop-Up Camp Out"	August 15, 2014
19	9	"The Never Ending Pop-Up Adventure" / "The Tidy Popper-Upper"	August 22, 2014
20	10	"Pop-Up Scouts" / "The Pop-Up Easter Egg Hunt"	August 29, 2014
21	11	"Banana Pops" / "Movie Night Popcorn"	September 5, 2014
22	12	"Pop-Up Genie" / "Pop-Up Skate Park"	September 12, 2014
23	13	"Pop Up, Up and Away" / "The Pop-Up Christmas Calendar"	September 19, 2014
24	14	"Where in the World Is Zack's Pop-Up Watch?" / "Pop-Up Parade"	September 26, 2014
25	15	"The Pop-Up Museum" / "The Pop-Up Roller Coaster"	October 3, 2014
26	16	"Pop-Up Posse to the Rescue" / "Pop-Up Golf"	October 10, 2014

=== Season 3 (2016–17) ===
No. overall	No. in season	Title	Original release date
27	1	"Wish Upon a Pop-Up" / "Catch Kira Poptacular"	May 23, 2016
28	2	"Grumpy in Pop-Up Land" / "Pop Fu Duck"	May 25, 2016
29	3	"Pop Witch and Broomsticks" / "Double Duck"	October 24, 2016
30	4	"Viking Pop Ball" / "Pop-Up Swap"	October 26, 2016
31	5	"Ice Pop Sisters" / "Fluffy and the Pop Bears"	December 4, 2016
32	6	"Pop-Up Pegasus" / "Pop Goes the Balloon"	December 15, 2016
33	7	"Pop-Up Counting Sheep" / "Pop-Up Tearaway"	February 5, 2017
