= Yvette Kaplan =

American animator and filmmaker (born 1955)

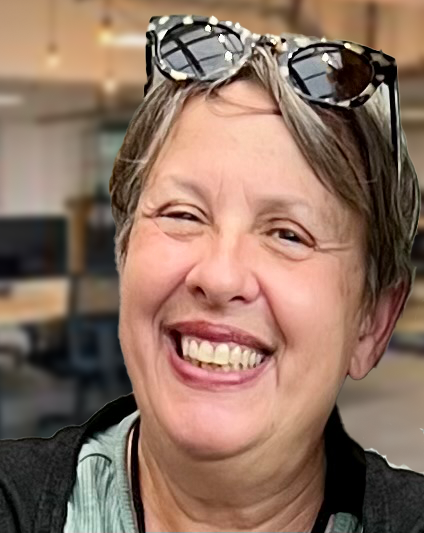

Yvette Kaplan is an American animator, director, and producer of animated films.

She was born Yvette Rosenberg in New York in 1955 and grew up in Brooklyn. After high school, she attended the School of Visual Arts, studying under Howard Beckerman.

Kaplan began her career at a New York studio called Tele-tactics, where she worked with animators Dan Haskett, Tom Sito, and John Canemaker. In the 1970s and 80s, she animated for commercial television at a variety of Manhattan studios, including Broadcast Arts.

In 1991, Kaplan was hired to direct episodes of Doug for Jumbo Pictures. She began at MTV Animation studios in 1994, directing episodes of Beavis and Butt-Head. In 1996, she was the animation director for the feature film Beavis and Butt-Head Do America.

She is one of the creators of the children's animated TV series Zack & Quack from 2014.
