= Zack & Quack =

- Created by: Gili Dolev; Yvette Kaplan
- Written by: Robert Vargas
- Directed by: Ehud Landsberg; Liz Whitaker; Yvette Kaplan; Gilad Bar
- Voices of: Thomas Albritton; Eli Paul; Colin McFarlane; Madison Zamor; Regan Lutz; Maria May; Clancy Penny; Jesse Ray Sheps
- Composer: Mick Cooke
- Countries of origin: France; Israel; United Kingdom; South Korea
- Original languages: Hebrew; English; Korean
- No. of seasons: 3
- No. of episodes: 33 (list of episodes)

Production
- Executive producers: Ronen Shani; Yvette Kaplan; Vanessa Hill; Nigel Pickard; Jae-Woong Um
- Producer: Simon Spencer
- Running time: 11 minutes
- Production companies: Zodiak Kids Studios UK (Note: Known as The Foundation for its first two series); Candy Bear; QQD Limited; High1 Entertainment

Original release
- Network: Nick Jr.
- Release: February 7, 2014 – February 5, 2017

Related
- Tickety Toc

Zack & Quack is an animated children's television series created by Gili Dolev and Yvette Kaplan. Produced by Zodiak Media, the series premiered on Nick Jr. in the United Kingdom and Ireland on February 7, 2014. In the United States, it began airing on the same channel on April 5, 2014. It ended on February 5, 2017, with 33 episodes produced alongside 3 seasons.

== Premise ==
Set inside a pop-up book, the show follows the adventures of 7-year-old Zack and his best friend, Quack.

== Episodes ==
Season	Segments	Episodes	Originally released	
Season	Segments	Episodes	First released	Last released
1	20	10	February 7, 2014	April 11, 2014
2	32	16	June 27, 2014	October 10, 2014
3	14	7	May 23, 2016	February 5, 2017

== Characters ==
- Zack (voiced by Thomas Albritton in seasons 1-2 and Eli Paul in season 3) is a 7-year-old boy and the protagonist of the show. His best friends are Quack and Kira.
- Quack (vocal effects provided by Nick Baker) is a blue mallard who is Zack's best friend. Despite the fact that he can't speak, everybody can understand his quacking.
- Kira (voiced by Madison Zamor) is an 8-year-old girl with curly hair who can fix anything with a little creativity and various tools.
- Hop (voiced by Maria May in seasons 1-2 and Clancy Penny in season 3) and Skip (voiced by Regan Lutz) are a pair of very acrobatic squirrel sisters. Hop is pink while Skip is purple and is the smaller of the two.
- Fluffy (voiced by Jesse Ray Sheps) is a wide-eyed young brown hedgehog.
- Belly-Up (voiced by Colin McFarlane) is an expert and lovable green bullfrog.
