= List of animated television series of 2012 =

This is a list of animated television series first aired in 2012.

Title	Seasons	Episodes	Country	Year	Original channel	Technique
A.U	10	423	China	2012	CCTV-1	Flash
Action Dad	1	22	Brazil	2012	Cartoon Network Brazil	Flash
The Adventures of Figaro Pho	1	39	Australia	2012	ABC3	CGI
The Airport Diary	3	73	China; South Korea	2012–16	KBS2	CGI
Akis	1	12	Malaysia	2012	Nickelodeon	Flash
Alfie Atkins	1	13	Denmark; Germany; Norway; Sweden	2012	NRK	Traditional
The Aquabats! Super Show!	2	21	United States	2012–14	The Hub	Live-action/Flash
Arpo: The Robot for All Kids	1	52	South Korea	2012	MBC TV	CGI
Atomic Forest	2	19	Russia	2012–14	2×2	Flash
Awesome Magical Tales	1	26	Mexico; Australia; Ireland; United States; Canada	2012–13	Seven Network	Flash
Barbie: Life in the Dreamhouse	7	75	United States	2012–15	YouTube	CGI
Beats in Bites	1	35	Canada	2012	TVOKids	Live action/Flash
The Beet Party	1	104	Canada; South Korea	2012	Yoopa	CGI
Ben 10: Omniverse	8	80	United States	2012–14	Cartoon Network	Traditional
Big Block SingSong	4	89	Canada	2012–17	Kids' CBC	Flash
Big Bugs Band	1	15	Israel; United Kingdom	2012	BabyTV	CGI
The Big Lez Show	4	36	Australia	2012–19	YouTube	Flash
The Bite-Sized Adventures of Sam Sandwich	1	10	United States	2012	Disney Junior	Stop motion/Live action
Black Dynamite	2	20	United States	2012–15	Adult Swim	Traditional/Flash
Bondi Band	1	52	Spain; Italy	2012	Disney XD	Flash
Boonie Bears	14	884	China	2012–25	CCTV-14	CGI
Bravest Warriors	4	82	United States; Canada (season 4)	2012–18	YouTube (seasons 1–2); VRV (seasons 3–4); Teletoon; Boomerang	Traditional (seasons 1–3); Flash (season 4)
Brickleberry	3	36	United States	2012–15	Comedy Central	Flash (season 1)/Toon Boom (season 2–3)
Capitan Kuk	1	26	Italy	2012	Rai Yoyo	Flash
Care Bears: Welcome to Care-a-Lot	1	26	United States	2012	The Hub	CGI
Catolicadas	12	119	Mexico	2012–present	Capital 21	Flash
The Chica Show	2	26	United States	2012–15	PBS Kids Sprout/Sprout	Flash/Live action
Cloudbabies	1	52	United Kingdom	2012–13	CBeebies	CGI
Crafty Kids Club	1	52	France	2012	France 5	Flash
Daniel Tiger's Neighborhood	7	152	United States; Canada	2012–present	PBS Kids; CBC Television	Flash (seasons 1–5); Toon Boom (season 6 onwards)
The Darwinners	5	180	France	2012–17	Arte	Flash
Dinofroz	2	52	Italy	2012–15	K2	Flash
DIZI	1	10	Mexico	2012	Once TV Mexico	Flash
Doc McStuffins	5	136	United States; Ireland	2012–20	Disney Junior	CGI
DreamWorks Dragons	8	118	United States	2012–18	Cartoon Network (2012–14); Netflix (2015–18)	CGI
Dufan the Defender	1	26	Indonesia	2012	Indosiar	CGI
Dunia Eicak	1	26	Malaysia	2012	TV3	CGI
Émilie	1	52	France	2012	France 5	CGI
Fábrica de Huevos	1	12	Mexico; United States	2012	Azteca America	Live action/Flash
Flea-Bitten!	1	52	Australia	2012	Nine Network	Flash
The Flooding of Jinshan Temple	1	52	China	2012	CCTV-14	Traditional
Flying Animals	2	44	Russia	2012–18	YouTube; Carousel	Flash
Fugget About It	3	46	Canada; United States	2012–16, 2024–25	Teletoon at Night (seasons 1–2); Fixies (season 3); Hulu; YouTube (2024–25)	Flash
Full English	1	6	United Kingdom; United States	2012	Channel 4	Traditional
Fungi	1	26	Spain	2012	TV3	Flash
Fuzzy Tales	1	50	Canada	2012	CBC Television	
Gormiti Nature Unleashed	1	26	Italy	2012–13	Cartoon Network	CGI
Gravity Falls	2	40	United States	2012–16	Disney Channel (season 1); Disney XD (season 2)	Traditional
Groove High	1	26	United Kingdom; France; Ireland; Belgium; China; Philippines	2012–13	Disney Channel	Traditional/Flash/Live action
Heroes of the City	2	52	Sweden	2012–14	Cartoon Network	CGI
The High Fructose Adventures of Annoying Orange	2	60	United States	2012–14	Cartoon Network	Syncro-Vox/Live action
Howzzattt	1	13	India	2012	Disney XD	
Joe & Jack	1	39	Ireland	2012	RTÉ	Flash
Kaijudo	2	52	United States	2012–13	The Hub	Traditional
Kijeu CSI	2	104	South Korea	2012–14	MBC	Traditional
KikoRiki: New Adventures	1	57	Russia	2012–13	Channel One	CGI
KikoRiki: Pin-Code	4	104	Russia	2012–18	Channel One	CGI
Kioka	1	78	South Korea	2012	KBS2	CGI
Knuckleheads	3	39	Canada	2012–17	Télétoon la nuit	Flash; Syncro-Vox/Live action
Kobushi	1	104	France	2012	Gulli	Flash
Kol's World	2	15	Canada	2012–14	The Pet Network	Flash
Krogzilla	1	10	United States	2012	YouTube	Flash
The Legend of Huainanzi	2	52	China	2012–14	CCTV-14	Traditional
The Legend of Korra	4	52	United States	2012–14	Nickelodeon	Traditional
Limon and Oli	3	104	Turkey	2012–20	TRT Çocuk	CGI
The Lingo Show	2	30	United Kingdom	2012–13	CBeebies	Flash/Live action
Littlest Pet Shop (2012)	4	104	United States; Canada	2012–16	Hub Network/Discovery Family	Flash
Luv Kushh			India	2012–14	Disney XD	
The Magical Toothfairies	2	26	Germany	2012–16	RiC; Fix & Foxi	Traditional
Martine	2	104	France	2012–17	M6	CGI
Maya the Bee	2	130	Germany; France	2012–17	ZDF; KiKa	CGI
Meine Freundin Conni	2	52	Germany	2012–15	KiKa	CGI
Mia and Me	4	104	Germany; Italy (seasons 1–2); Canada (season 1)	2012–23	KiKa; Rai 2/Rai Gulp/Rai Play	CGI/Live action
Michel	1	26	France; Germany	2012	Canal+ Family	
Mini Wolf	2	126	France	2012–15	France 5	Flash
Mio			Mexico	2012–18	Canal Once	Flash
Monster Math Squad		132	Canada	2012–16	CBC Television	CGI
Motorcity	1	20	United States	2012–13	Disney XD	Flash
Motu Patlu	16	1,284	India	2012–present	Nickelodeon	CGI
Mudpit	2	26	Canada	2012–13	Teletoon	CGI/Live action
The Mysterious Cities of Gold	3	78	France; Belgium; Portugal	2012–21	La Trois; TF1 (seasons 2–3); Canal Panda	Traditional
Nae Salang Ddung	2	104	South Korea	2012	MBC	
Napoleon Dynamite	1	6	United States	2012	Fox	Traditional
The New Adventures of Peter Pan	2	52	France; Germany; India; Italy	2012–16	DeA Kids; France 3	CGI
Nulli & Priesemut	1	33	Germany	2012	KiKa	Flash
The Numtums	3	77	United Kingdom	2012–13	CBeebies	Flash (Season 1); CGI (Seasons 2–3)
Nutri Ventures	5	52	Portugal	2012–14	RTP2	Flash
Outopus	1	52	Costa Rica	2012		Flash
Percy's Tiger Tales	2	52	France; Luxembourg	2012	TiJi	CGI
Pérusse Cité	2	23	Canada	2012–13	Radio-Canada	Flash
Peter Rabbit	2	56	United Kingdom	2012–16	CBeebies; Nickelodeon	CGI
Le Petit Spirou	1	78	France	2012	RTBF; M6	
Princess Lillifee	1	26	Germany	2012	KiKa; Das Erste	Traditional
Le Ranch	2	52	France	2012–16	TF1	Flash
Randy Cunningham: 9th Grade Ninja	2	50	Ireland, United Kingdom, United States	2012–15	Disney XD	Flash
Renata	1	13	Chile	2012	Mega	Flash/CGI
Ringelgasse 19	2	26	Germany	2012–14	Das Erste, KiKa	
Robot and Monster	1	26	United States	2012–15	Nickelodeon	CGI
Rolando Locomotov		140	Russia	2012	Carousel, Moolt	CGI
Samurai! Daycare	1	10	United States	2012	YouTube	Flash
Scary Larry	1	52	France, United States	2012	Canal+ Family	Flash
Secret Jouju	13		South Korea	2012–present	JEI Talent TV	CGI
Shaun the Sheep 3D	1	15	United Kingdom	2012	Nintendo Video	Stop motion
Shaun the Sheep Championsheeps	1	21	United Kingdom	2012	CBBC	Stop motion
SheZow	1	26	Australia, Canada	2012–13	Network Ten	Flash
Sítio do Picapau Amarelo	3	78	Brazil	2012–16	TV Globo, Cartoon Network	Flash
Slugterra	6	63	Canada	2012–16	Disney XD, Netflix	CGI
SuperF***ers	1	12	United States	2012–13	YouTube	Flash
Suraj: The Rising Star	1	26	India	2012–13	Colors TV	
Talking Friends	1	10	United States	2012	YouTube	CGI
Teenage Mutant Ninja Turtles	5	124	United States	2012–17	Nickelodeon	CGI
Tickety Toc	2	52	South Korea, United Kingdom	2012–15	EBS, Nick Jr. Channel	CGI
Tilly and Friends	1	52	United Kingdom	2012	CBeebies	Flash
Toby's Travelling Circus		52	United Kingdom	2012–13	Milkshake!	Stop motion
Tooned	5	30	United Kingdom	2012–16	Sky Sports F1	CGI
Trains: The Animated Series	3	130	Russia	2012–17	Russia-1	CGI/Flash
Tree Fu Tom	5	72	United Kingdom	2012–16	CBeebies	CGI
Tron: Uprising	1	19	United States	2012–13	Disney XD	CGI/Traditional
TuTiTu	11	138	Israel	2012–present	YouTube, Luli	CGI
Ulisse: My Name Is Nobody	1	26	Italy	2012	Rai 2	
Ultimate Spider-Man	4	104	United States	2012–17	Disney XD	Traditional
UMIGO	1	20	United States	2012	Syndication	Flash
Unsupervised	1	13	United States	2012	FX	Flash
Vary Peri	1	40	China, South Korea, Hong Kong	2012–13	JiaJia Kids, Golden Eagle Television, Tencent Video, TVB, Tooniverse, KBS1	CGI
Where's My Water?: Swampy's Underground Adventures	1	12	United States	2012–13	disney.com	Flash
Wild Grinders	2	52	United States	2012–15	Nicktoons	Flash
The Wild Soccer Bunch	2	26	Germany	2012–14	KiKa	
Wismo's Little Tales		52	Switzerland	2012		Flash
Wizard Mutterl	1	26	South Korea	2012	EBS	Traditional
The Woodlies	1	26	Australia, Germany	2012	KiKa, Seven Network	CGI
Xia Lan	7	196	China	2012–18	CCTV-14	CGI
YooHoo & Friends (2012)	1	26	United States, Canada, South Korea	2012		Flash/Traditional
Zou	3	156	France, Singapore	2012–18	Disney Junior	CGI

Anime television series first aired in 2012
Title	Episodes	Country	Year	Original channel	Technique
Accel World	24	Japan	2012	Tokyo MX, MBS	Traditional
Aesthetica of a Rogue Hero	12	Japan	2012		Traditional
Aikatsu!	178	Japan	2012–16		Traditional
AKB0048	13	Japan	2012	tvk, GTV, TVS, Sun TV, HTV	Traditional
Amagami SS+ plus	13	Japan	2012		Traditional
The Ambition of Oda Nobuna	12	Japan	2012		Traditional
Another	12	Japan	2012	KNB	Traditional
Aquarion Evol	26	Japan	2012	TV Tokyo	Traditional
Arashi no Yoru ni: Himitsu no Tomodachi	26	Japan	2012	TXN	CGI
B-Daman Fireblast	52	Japan	2012–13	TXN	Traditional
Baku Tech! Bakugan	51	Japan	2012–13		
Bakuman 3	25	Japan	2012–13	NHK E	Traditional
Battle Spirits: Sword Eyes	29	Japan	2012–13		Traditional
Beyblade: Shogun Steel	45	Japan	2012	TXN	Traditional
BeyWheelz	13	Japan	2012		Traditional
Black Rock Shooter	8	Japan	2012	Fuji TV	Traditional
Blast of Tempest	24	Japan	2012–13		Traditional
Bodacious Space Pirates	26	Japan	2012	Tokyo MX, MBS, tvk	Traditional
Boku no Imōto wa "Ōsaka Okan"	12	Japan	2012–13		Traditional
Brave 10	12	Japan	2012		Traditional
Btooom!	12	Japan	2012	Tokyo MX	Traditional
Busou Shinki	12	Japan	2012		Traditional
Campione!	13	Japan	2012		Traditional
Cardfight!! Vanguard: Asia Circuit	39	Japan	2012–13	TXN	Traditional
Chitose Get You!!	26	Japan	2012		Traditional
Chōsoku Henkei Gyrozetter	51	Japan	2012–13		Traditional
Chōyaku Hyakunin isshu: Uta Koi	13	Japan	2012		Traditional
Code:Breaker	13	Japan	2012		Traditional
Daily Lives of High School Boys	12	Japan	2012	TV Tokyo	Traditional
Dangerous Jii-san Ja		Japan	2012	Kids Station	
Dog Days'	13	Japan	2012		Traditional
Duel Masters Victory V	51	Japan	2012–13	TXN	
Dusk Maiden of Amnesia	12	Japan	2012		Traditional
Eagle Talon Neo	38	Japan	2012–13	NHK E	Flash
Ebiten: Kōritsu Ebisugawa Kōkō Tenmonbu	10	Japan	2012		Traditional
Eureka Seven: AO	24	Japan	2012		Traditional
The Familiar of Zero: F	12	Japan	2012		Traditional
Fate/Zero 2	12	Japan	2012		Traditional
Folktales from Japan	258	Japan	2012–17	TXN	Traditional
From the New World	25	Japan	2012–13		Traditional
Gintama': Enchōsen	13	Japan	2012–13		Traditional
Girls und Panzer	12	Japan	2012–13		Traditional
Gokujyo. Gokurakuin Joshi Kōryō Monogatari	12	Japan	2012	Chukyo TV	Traditional
Gon	50	Japan	2012–13		CGI
Good Luck Girl!	13	Japan	2012		Traditional
Haitai Nanafa	13	Japan	2012	QAB	Traditional
Hakuoki: Dawn of the Shinsengumi	12	Japan	2012		Traditional
Hayate the Combat Butler: Can't Take My Eyes Off You	12	Japan	2012		Traditional
Hidamari Sketch × Honeycomb	12	Japan	2012		Traditional
High School DxD	12	Japan	2012		Traditional
Hiiro no Kakera: The Tamayori Princess Saga	13	Japan	2012		Traditional
Hiiro no Kakera: The Tamayori Princess Saga 2	13	Japan	2012		Traditional
Himitsu Kessha Taka no Tsume Gaiden Mukashi no Yoshida-kun	9	Japan	2012	MBS	Flash
Horizon in the Middle of Nowhere II	13	Japan	2012		Traditional
Humanity Has Declined	12	Japan	2012		Traditional
Hyouka	22	Japan	2012		Traditional
Inazuma Eleven GO: Chrono Stone	51	Japan	2012–13		Traditional
Initial D: Fifth Stage	14	Japan	2012–13		Traditional
Inu × Boku SS	12	Japan	2012		Traditional
Is This a Zombie? of the Dead	10	Japan	2012		Traditional
Ixion Saga DT	25	Japan	2012–13		Traditional
Jewelpet Kira Deco!	52	Japan	2012–13		Traditional
JoJo's Bizarre Adventure	26	Japan	2012–13		Traditional
Jormungand	12	Japan	2012		Traditional
Jormungand: Perfect Order	12	Japan	2012		Traditional
Joshiraku	13	Japan	2012		Traditional
K	13	Japan	2012		Traditional
Kamisama Kiss	13	Japan	2012		Traditional
Kids on the Slope	12	Japan	2012	Fuji TV, THK	Traditional
Kill Me Baby	13	Japan	2012		Traditional
Kimi to Boku 2	13	Japan	2012		Traditional
Kingdom	38	Japan	2012–13	NHK BSP	Traditional
The Knight in the Area	37	Japan	2012	TV Asahi	Traditional
Kokoro Connect	17	Japan	2012		Traditional
Kuroko's Basketball	25	Japan	2012		Traditional
Kuromajo-san ga Toru!!	60	Japan	2012–14	NHK E	Traditional
Lagrange: The Flower of Rin-ne	12	Japan	2012	Tokyo MX, ytv	Traditional
Lagrange: The Flower of Rin-ne 2	12	Japan	2012	Tokyo MX, ytv	Traditional
Listen to Me, Girls. I Am Your Father!	12	Japan	2012		Traditional
Litchi DE Hikari Club	8	Japan	2012	Tokyo MX	Flash
Little Battlers eXperience W	58	Japan	2012–13	TXN	Traditional
Little Busters!	26	Japan	2012–13	Tokyo MX, tvk, MBS, TV Aichi	Traditional
Love, Chunibyo & Other Delusions	12	Japan	2012		Traditional
Love, Election and Chocolate	12	Japan	2012		Traditional
Lupin the Third: The Woman Called Fujiko Mine	13	Japan	2012		Traditional
Magi: The Labyrinth of Magic	25	Japan	2012–13		Traditional
Medaka Box	12	Japan	2012		Traditional
Medaka Box Abnormal	12	Japan	2012		Traditional
Mini Rope	4	Japan	2012		
Monchicchiisu	20	Japan	2012–13	Kids Station	CGI
Monsuno	65	Japan, United States	2012–14	Nicktoons, Hulu, TXN	Traditional
Moyasimon Returns	11	Japan	2012		Traditional
Muv-Luv Alternative: Total Eclipse	24	Japan	2012		Traditional
My Little Monster	13	Japan	2012		Traditional
Mysterious Girlfriend X	13	Japan	2012		Traditional
Nakaimo – My Sister Is Among Them!	12	Japan	2012		Traditional
Natsuiro Kiseki	12	Japan	2012	MBS	Traditional
Natsume's Book of Friends 4	13	Japan	2012		Traditional
Natsuyuki Rendezvous	11	Japan	2012		Traditional
Nekomonogatari (Black)	4	Japan	2012		Traditional
Ninja Hattori-kun Returns	156	Japan, India	2012–present	Nickelodeon	Flash (Seasons 1-6)/Traditional (Seasons 2-3)
Nisemonogatari	11	Japan	2012		Traditional
Nyarko-san: Another Crawling Chaos	12	Japan	2012		Traditional
OniAi	12	Japan	2012		Traditional
Oshiri Kajiri Mushi	20	Japan	2012–13	NHK BSP	
Ozuma	6	Japan	2012	WOWOW	Traditional
Paboo & Mojies	52	Japan, South Korea	2012–13	BS Fuji	
Penguin no Mondai POW	51	Japan	2012–13		
The Pet Girl of Sakurasou	24	Japan	2012–13		Traditional
Phi Brain: Puzzle of God – The Orpheus Order	25	Japan	2012	NHK E	Traditional
Picchipichi Shizuku-chan	52	Japan	2012–13	Sun TV	Traditional
Place to Place	12	Japan	2012	TBS	Traditional
Polar Bear Café	50	Japan	2012–13		Traditional
Poyopoyo Kansatsu Nikki	52	Japan	2012	TV Tokyo	Traditional
Pretty Rhythm: Dear My Future	51	Japan	2012–13	TXN	Traditional
The Prince of Tennis II	13	Japan	2012		Traditional
Psycho-Pass	22	Japan	2012–13		Traditional
Queen's Blade Rebellion	12	Japan	2012		Traditional
Recorder and Randsell Do	13	Japan	2012	TVS	Traditional
Recorder and Randsell Re	13	Japan	2012	KBS	Traditional
Ribbon-chan	24	Japan	2012–13	TXN	
Rita & Whatsit	26	Japan, France	2012	NHK E	Traditional
Robin with His 100 Friends Season 2	13	Japan	2012		
Robotics;Notes	22	Japan	2012–13		Traditional
Rock Lee & His Ninja Pals	51	Japan	2012–13	TXN	Traditional
Saint Seiya Omega	97	Japan	2012–14		Traditional
Saki Achiga-hen Episode of Side-A	16	Japan	2012–13		Traditional
Sankarea: Undying Love	12	Japan	2012	TBS	Traditional
Say I Love You	13	Japan	2012		Traditional
Sengoku Collection	26	Japan	2012		Traditional
Shimajirō: A World of Wow!	584+	Japan	2012–present	TXN	CGI
Shining Hearts: Shiawase no Pan	12	Japan	2012		Traditional
Smile PreCure!	48	Japan	2012–13	ANN	Traditional
So, I Can't Play H!	12	Japan	2012		Traditional
Space Brothers	99	Japan	2012–14		Traditional
Star Blazers: Space Battleship Yamato 2199	26	Japan	2012–13		Traditional
La storia della Arcana Famiglia	12	Japan	2012		Traditional
Sword Art Online	25	Japan	2012		Traditional
Symphogear	13	Japan	2012	Tokyo MX	Traditional
Tamagotchi! Yume Kira Dream	49	Japan	2012–13		Traditional
Tanken Driland	37	Japan	2012–13	TXN	Traditional
Tantei Opera Milky Holmes: Act 2	12	Japan	2012		Traditional
Tari Tari	13	Japan	2012		Traditional
Teekyu	12	Japan	2012	Tokyo MX	Traditional
Thermae Romae	6	Japan	2012	Fuji TV	Flash
To Love Ru Darkness	12	Japan	2012		Traditional
Tsuritama	12	Japan	2012	Fuji TV, THK	Traditional
Upotte!!	10	Japan	2012		Traditional
Victory Kickoff!!	39	Japan	2012–13		Traditional
Waiting in the Summer	12	Japan	2012	TV Aichi, KBS, AT-X	Traditional
Wooser's Hand-to-Mouth Life	12	Japan	2012		CGI
World War Blue	3	Japan	2012–13		Traditional
Yu-Gi-Oh! Zexal II	73	Japan	2012–14	TXN	Traditional
Yurumates 3D	13	Japan	2012		Traditional
Yurumates 3D Plus	13	Japan	2012		Traditional
YuruYuri 2	12	Japan	2012		Traditional
Zetman	13	Japan	2012		Traditional

== See also ==
- List of animated feature films of 2012
- List of Japanese animation television series of 2012
