= List of Recorder and Randsell episodes =

Recorder and Randsell is an anime television series by Seven based on the 4-panel manga series by Meme Higashiya. The story revolves around Atsushi Miyagawa, an elementary school student with the appearance of a full grown adult, and his older sister Atsumi, who conversely looks young despite being a high school student. The first two seasons, Do♪ and Re♪, aired on TV Saitama between January 5, 2012 and June 27, 2012 and was simulcast on Crunchyroll. The ending theme for the first season is "Glitter" by Aoi Tada feat. Sister 773 whilst the second season's ending theme is "Stare" by Paprika. A third season, Mi☆, began airing in July 2013. Its ending theme is "One, Two, Hello" (ワンツーハロー, Wan Tsū Harō) by Nanami Kashiyama.

== Episode list ==
=== Season 1 (Do♪) ===
| No. | Title | Original release date |
|---|---|---|
| 1 | "Atsushi and Atsumi"; Transliteration: "Atsushi to Atsumi" (Japanese: あつしとあつみ) | January 5, 2012 |
As Atsushi prepares for a recorder exam, his appearance to others leads him into a tough situation when he tries to talk to one of his classmates.
| 2 | "Atsumi and Everyday Life"; Transliteration: "Atsumi to Nichijō" (Japanese: あつみと日常) | January 12, 2012 |
Atsumi takes Atsushi shopping with her.
| 3 | "Sayo and Atsumi"; Transliteration: "Sayo to Atsumi" (Japanese: 沙夜とあつみ) | January 19, 2012 |
Sayo and Atsumi discuss what kind of guys they like.
| 4 | "Atsushi and Elementary School"; Transliteration: "Atsushi to Shōgakkō" (Japanese: あつしと小学校) | January 26, 2012 |
Atsushi's elementary school teacher, Futami Moriyama, has problems dealing with Atsushi. Later, being with Hina, Atsushi has a run-in with authorities again.
| 5 | "Atsushi and Setsubun"; Transliteration: "Atsushi to Setsubun" (Japanese: あつしと節分) | February 1, 2012 |
An oni costume Atsushi borrows for Setsubun proves a bit too scary for his schoolmates.
| 6 | "Atsushi and Chocolate"; Transliteration: "Atsushi to Choko" (Japanese: あつしとチョコ) | February 8, 2012 |
Atsushi receives a lot of chocolate from the other girls on Valentine's Day.
| 7 | "Movies and Misunderstandings"; Transliteration: "Eiga to Kanchigai" (Japanese: 映画と勘違い) | February 15, 2012 |
Sayo goes to the movies with Atsumi and Atsushi, unaware that Atsushi is Atsumi's little brother.
| 8 | "Atsushi and the Doll Festival"; Transliteration: "Atsushi to Hinamatsuri" (Japanese: あつしとひなまつり) | February 22, 2012 |
Atsushi is invited to Hina's house for Hinamatsuri, but is turned away by her suspicious parents.
| 9 | "Big Bro Take and Employment"; Transliteration: "Take-nii to Shūshoku" (Japanese: タケ兄と就職) | February 29, 2012 |
Atsushi and Atsumi's neighbour, Take, comes over after breaking up with his girlfriend and quitting his job.
| 10 | "Atsushi and White Day"; Transliteration: "Atsushi to Howaito Dē" (Japanese: あつしとホワイトデー) | March 7, 2012 |
Atsushi gets help from Atsumi to make some gifts for White Day.
| 11 | "Atsushi and the Library"; Transliteration: "Atsushi to Toshokan" (Japanese: あつしと図書館) | March 14, 2012 |
Atsushi tries to do his homework at the library, where he encounters Sayo again.
| 12 | "Atsushi and Misunderstandings"; Transliteration: "Atsushi to Gokai" (Japanese: あつしと誤解) | March 21, 2012 |
Atsushi faces yet more misunderstandings with the police.
| 13 | "Flower Blossoms and Siblings"; Transliteration: "Hanami to Kyōdai" (Japanese: 花見と姉弟) | March 28, 2012 |
As people gather for a flower viewing party, Atsushi and Atsumi deal with a drunken Futami
| Special–1 | "Summer and Pool"; Transliteration: "Natsu to Pūru" (Japanese: 夏とプール) | April 20, 2012 |
Sayo attempts to teach Atsushi how to swim.

=== Season 2 (Re♪) ===
| No. | Title | Original release date |
|---|---|---|
| 14 | "New Students and Misunderstandings"; Transliteration: "Shinnyūsei to Kanchigai" (Japanese: 新入生と勘違い) | April 4, 2012 |
As a new school year starts, both Atsushi and Atsumi face misunderstandings with the new batch of students.
| 15 | "Atsushi and Bicycles"; Transliteration: "Atsushi to Jitensha" (Japanese: あつしと自転車) | April 11, 2012 |
Atsushi's friends try to teach him how to ride a bike without training wheels.
| 16 | "Atsushi and Dreams"; Transliteration: "Atsushi to Yume" (Japanese: あつしと夢) | April 18, 2012 |
Atsushi and Atsumi think about what they want to do in the future.
| 17 | "Snacks and Cheering"; Transliteration: "Okashi to Ōen" (Japanese: おかしと応援) | April 25, 2012 |
As Atsumi ends up making too many snacks for Atsushi and his friends, she invites over Sayo, who continues to misunderstand who Atsushi really is.
| 18 | "Family and Hot Springs"; Transliteration: "Kazoku to Onsen" (Japanese: 家族と温泉) | May 2, 2012 |
Atsushi, Atsumi and their family go to a hot spring inn where Atsumi's height becomes a bother for her.
| 19 | "Atsushi and Sports Festivals Part 1"; Transliteration: "Atsushi to Undōkai Sono Ichi" (Japanese: あつしと運動会 その1) | May 9, 2012 |
Atsumi has to act as Atsushi's parent so he can participate in his school's sports festival.
| 20 | "Atsushi and Sports Festivals Part 2"; Transliteration: "Atsushi to Undōkai Sono Ni" (Japanese: あつしと運動会 その2) | May 16, 2012 |
Atsushi and Atsumi have lunch with Sayo before participating in a relay race.
| 21 | "Misunderstanding and Truth"; Transliteration: "Gokai to Shinjitsu" (Japanese: 誤解と真実) | May 23, 2012 |
Sayo learns the truth that Atsushi is Atsumi's little brother.
| 22 | "Atsushi and Hand-me-downs"; Transliteration: "Atsushi to Osagari no Fuku" (Japanese: あつしとお下がりの服) | May 30, 2012 |
Atsushi wears some clothes handed down from Take, which prove to be a bit controversial.
| 23 | "Atsushi and School Festivals"; Transliteration: "Atsushi to Bunkusai" (Japanese: あつしと文化祭) | June 6, 2012 |
Atsushi and his friends go to Atsumi's school culture festival where he runs into Sayo.
| 24 | "Big Sister and Little Sister"; Transliteration: "Ane to Imōto" (Japanese: 姉と妹) | June 13, 2012 |
Atsumi and Sayo spend some time together
| 25 | "Atsushi and Chases"; Transliteration: "Atsushi to Oikakekko" (Japanese: あつしと追いかけっこ) | June 20, 2012 |
A game of hide and seek soon turns into a frantic escape from the cops for Atsushi.
| 26 | "Atsushi and See You Soon"; Transliteration: "Atsushi to Mata ne" (Japanese: あつしとまたね) | June 27, 2012 |
Atsushi joins Atsumi and Sayo to a family restaurant.
| Special–2 | "Atsushi and Bartenders"; Transliteration: "Atsushi to Bātendā" (Japanese: あつしとバーテンダー) | July 20, 2012 |
Whilst visiting Take's part time job at a bar, Atsushi is mistakenly hired as a bartender.

=== Season 3 (Mi☆) ===
| No. | Title | Original release date |
|---|---|---|
| 1 | "Recorder and Randsell Mi★"; Transliteration: "Rikōdā to Randoseru Mi★" (Japanese: リコーダーとランドセル ミ★) | July 8, 2013 |
Atsushi is taken to meet a new police recruit, Aono, before going to the arcades with his friends.
| 2 | "Sayo and Shelter from the Rain"; Transliteration: "Sayo to Amayadori" (Japanese: 沙夜と雨宿り) | July 15, 2013 |
Sayo and Hina briefly stop by Atsushi's house to shelter from the rain.
| 3 | "Inborn Nature and Illegality"; Transliteration: "Shinsei to Higōhō" (Japanese: 真性と非合法) | July 22, 2013 |
Atsumi has to deal with the similarly short Kobayashi and perverted lolicon Yoshioka.
| 4 | "Atsushi and Trainee Kawauchi-san"; Transliteration: "Atsushi to Jisshū nama Kawauchi-san" (Japanese: あつしと実習生川内さん) | July 29, 2013 |
A new trainee teacher, Kawauchi, begins training and is taken aback by Atsushi's behaviour.
| 5 | "Atsushi and the White-spotted Longhorned Beetle"; Transliteration: "Atsushi to Gomadara Kamikiri Mushi" (Japanese: あつしとゴマダラカミキリムシ」) | August 5, 2013 |
Sayo's thoughts of Atsushi are interrupted when a beetle lands on her.
| 6 | "Big Bro Take and Job Hunting!"; Transliteration: "Take-ni to Shūshoku Katsudō-chū!" (Japanese: タケ兄と就職活動中!) | August 12, 2013 |
Atsushi and Atsumi visit Take at his new job at a café.
| 7 | "Shorty and the Days of Anguish"; Transliteration: "Chitchai-kun to Kunō no Hibi" (Japanese: ちっちゃい君と苦悩の日々) | August 19, 2013 |
Kobayashi tries to get Atsumi to go on a date with Yoshioka.
| 8 | "Soul Brothers and Real Brothers"; Transliteration: "Tamashii no Kyōdai to Jitsu no Kyōdai" (Japanese: 魂の兄弟と実の兄弟) | August 26, 2013 |
Yoshioka seems to connect with Atsushi whilst his older brother demonstrates a nature on the polar opposite of Yoshioka.
| 9 | "Shaky Loves and Horror! A Midsummer's Nightmare!!"; Transliteration: "Yureru Koigokoro to Kaiki! Manatsu no Akumu!!" (Japanese: 揺れる恋心と怪奇！真夏の悪夢！！) | September 2, 2013 |
A visit to a school festival haunted house results in everyone being paired up all wrong.
| 10 | "Everyone and Summer Vacation -AM-"; Transliteration: "Minna no Natsu Yasumi -AM-" (Japanese: みんなと夏休み-AM-) | September 9, 2013 |
Sayo gets carried away acting out a Sci-fi scenario talking into the fan with Atsushi.
| 11 | "Everyone and Summer Vacation -PM-"; Transliteration: "Minna no Natsu Yasumi -PM-" (Japanese: みんなと夏休み-PM-) | September 16, 2013 |
Kobayashi dresses up to help Yoshioka-senpai through the big basketball game, while everyone else makes some summer memories.
| 12 | "MI is for Me and You and Everyone"; Transliteration: "MI wa Minna no MI" (Japanese: ミはみんなのミ) | September 23, 2013 |
Everyone heads for the Summer Festival, and things work out for Atsushi in the end.
| Special–3 | "Recorder and Red Randsell"; Transliteration: "Rikōdā to Aka Randoseru" (Japanese: リコーダーとアカランドセル) | October 2, 2013 |
In an alternate universe, everyone has switched gender.
