= The Numtums =

- Created by: Barry Quinn
- Directed by: Mark Taylor (series 2–3)
- Voices of: Simon Greenall; Kate Fleetwood; Ben Bailey Smith; Jane Pickworth; Kaizer Akhtar; Mairead Doherty; Gabriella Gillespie; Jake Phillips; Harvey Rafferty
- Composers: Paul Moessl; Francis Haines (series 2–3); Barrie Bignold (series 2–3); Kate Ockenden (series 2–3); Dave Howman (series 3); André Jacquemin (series 3)
- Country of origin: United Kingdom
- Original language: English
- No. of series: 3
- No. of episodes: 77 (list of episodes)

Production
- Executive producers: Tony Reed; Henrietta Hurford-Jones
- Producers: Lotte Elwell; Katherine McQueen; Barry Quinn
- Running time: 5 minutes (series 1); 11 minutes (series 2–3)
- Production companies: Beakus; A Productions; BBC

Original release
- Network: CBeebies
- Release: 27 February 2012 – 15 December 2014

The Numtums is a British animated children's television series created by Barry Quinn for CBeebies. It is about a group of 10 creatures called the Numtums, each with a number on their tummies. The show debuted on CBeebies in the United Kingdom on 27 February 2012, and ended on 15 December 2014 with a total of 3 series.

== Production ==
The Numtums was animated by Beakus in series 1 and A Productions in series 2 and 3. Series 1 was aimed at toddlers, but series 2 and 3 were revamped for an older audience, introducing more complex concepts such as subtraction, shape recognition and numbers from 11 to 20 with computer animation, and using a more Australian theme. The creator Barry Quinn said in an interview that "we were looking at doing a show about numbers for the early years and an educational expert told us bright, cute characters were a good way to get kids interested." A lot of animal names were suggested, but he settled on numbats who had "num" in their name.

== Broadcast ==
The Numtums debuted on CBeebies in the United Kingdom on 27 February 2012 on the channel's Love to Learn block. The series aired on ABC3 in Australia and New Zealand. In the United States, the show debuted on Qubo on 1 January 2015.

== See also ==
- Big Barn Farm
