= Dunia Eicak =

- Genre: Adventure, Comedy
- Created by: Fythullah; Azman Azahar
- Developed by: Addeen Multimedia Sdn. Bhd.
- Written by: Roy Abdillah; Deansham
- Directed by: Deansham; Azman Azahar (Season 1)
- Voices of: Afiq Idola Kecil; Deansham; Azman Azahar; Pipiyapong
- Theme music composer: Amir Syawal
- Opening theme: Dunia Kita (English version: Our World)
- Ending theme: Dunia Kita (English version: Our World)
- Country of origin: Malaysia
- Original languages: Malay; English
- No. of seasons: 1
- No. of episodes: 26 (list of episodes)

Production
- Running time: 11mins/episode (Season 1)

Original release
- Network: TV3; Nickelodeon Southeast Asia
- Release: 24 June – 16 December 2012

Dunia Eicak is a Malaysian animated television series produced by Addeen Multimedia. The show's plot centers on a boy, nicknamed Eicak, who discovers 'friends' in the most unexpected world. Dunia Eicak is a 3D animation series about appreciating friends, practicing good values, even when sometimes all you really want to do is run away.

The series was published in the HDTV format and was broadcast over TV3 beginning in June 2012, and on Nickelodeon beginning in March 2013.

== Production ==
Dunia Eicak is the first product of Addeen Multimedia Sdn. Bhd., an animation company established by Azman Azahar with one other partner. Addeen Multimedia operated in Cyberjaya since 2011.

The series was released in Malay version and then in English version for the local and international market, respectively. Both versions fully utilises the different voice actors.

== Characters ==
Character	Voice actor	Character information
Eicak	Afiq Idola Kecil (Malay Version)	The main character in the show is Eicak (his nickname). A good hearted 10 years old human boy. Eicak is honest, adventurous, and 'true'. Eicak's greatest satisfaction would be helping others. Greatest turn down, liars, and posers. Eicak is intellectual. For his age, he is a smart boy. Eicak loves to explore, and is not afraid to try new things. He loves music and art. He is not afraid to express himself. He is pretty good with word. Coming from the city, Eicak has a good fashion sense and pretty trendy. Eicak's only downside is he has the tendency to be judgmental.
Fenggo	Pipiyapong (Malay Version)	The village weird guy. He loves surfing, and the one and only in the village to do so. He sees things differently and his vision is different. In fact, he is a bit too advance for the other villagers.
Didie		
Elly		
Bobby		
Chip		
Jimmy	Deansham (Malay Version)	
Koozie		
Tok Ketua	Azman Azahar (Malay Version)	
Tok Pawang		
