= List of Kuromajo-san ga Toru!! episodes =

Kuromajo-san ga Toru!! is an anime television series by Shin-Ei Animation based on the series of children's novels written by Hiroshi Ishizaki and illustrated by Kaori Fujita. The series follows Chiyoko "Choco" Kurotori, a girl who inadvertently summons a black witch named Gyubid and ends up becoming her magical apprentice. The series began airing on NHK Educational TV from April 4, 2012. The series has been ongoing till February 19, 2014, and concluded on Episode 60 of Season 2. The opening theme is "Doki Doki Shichau no Oh Yeah! (Doki Doki しちゃうの Oh yeah!, A Heart Pounding Situation's Oh Yeah!) by Ayumu Shinga.

== Episode list ==
No.	Title	Original release date
1	"The School's Ghost vs. Ms. Black Witch"; Transliteration: "Gakkō no Kaidan VS Kuromajo-san" (Japanese: 学校の怪談VS黒魔女さん)	April 4, 2012
When Chiyoko "Choco" Kurotori attempts to summon Cupid with a stuffed nose, she instead summons the black witch, Gyubid, who decides to train her to become a black witch. Her first job involves investigating a ghost roaming around her school.
2	"It's Cycling, Ms. Black Witch"; Transliteration: "Saikuringu desu Kuromajo-san" (Japanese: サイクリングです 黒魔女さん)	April 11, 2012
When the school decides to hold a cycling rally, Chiyoko asks for Gyubid's magical help to compensate for her inability to ride a bike.
3	"Ms. Black Witch is Super Popular"; Transliteration: "Kuromajo-san Ōi ni Moteru" (Japanese: 黒魔女さん大いにモテる)	April 18, 2012
Chiyoko finds herself in a middle of a psychic debate between two boys over the existence of psychic powers, both of which want to date Chiyoko should they win their argument.
4	"It's First Love, Ms. Black Witch"; Transliteration: "Hatsukoi desu yo Kuromajo-san" (Japanese: 初恋ですよ黒魔女さん)	April 25, 2012
Perverted classmate Naoki Kojima takes an interest in a new transfer student, Ruru Ramon. However, Gyubid suspects Ruru to be a spirit attempting to sacrifice Naoki in order to become a black witch.
5	"Ms. Black Witch and the Great Kitty Rebellion"; Transliteration: "Kuromajo-san no Neko Neko Ōsōdō" (Japanese: 黒魔女さんのネコネコ大騒動)	May 9, 2012
Chiyoko finds her classmates have been turned into cats by an evil peddler who wants to make them his familiars.
6	"Ms. Black Witch Goes to Harajuku"; Transliteration: "Kuromajo-san Harajuku e Yuku" (Japanese: 黒魔女さん原宿へゆく)	May 16, 2012
While shopping in Harajuku, Chiyoko and her friend Megu are approached by a supposed model scout. However, this scout appears to be more than meets the eye.
7	"Ms. Black Witch and the Horror Field Trip"; Transliteration: "Kuromajo-san to Horā na Ensoku" (Japanese: 黒魔女さんとホラーな遠足)	May 23, 2012
While on a field trip, a girl named Rio Mukai is lured into a house by a witch named Baba Yaga, and it is up to Chiyoko and Gyubid to save her.
8	"Ms. Black Witch Fails at Love and Cooking"; Transliteration: "Kuromajo-san wa Koi to Ryōri ga Nigate" (Japanese: 黒魔女さんは恋と料理が苦手)	May 30, 2012
As one of her classmates helps prepare something for a picnic, Chiyoko ends up giving him an ingredient from the spirit world which causes everyone who eats the food to go love crazy.
9	"Ms. Black Witch's Exorcism Challenge"; Transliteration: "Kuromajo-san Yakubarai ni Chōsen suru" (Japanese: 黒魔女さん厄払いに挑戦する)	June 13, 2012
Chiyoko's friend Rinne asks her to help get rid of her bad luck.
10	"Ms. Black Witch Goes On TV"; Transliteration: "Kuromajo-san Terebi ni Deru" (Japanese: 黒魔女さんテレビにでる)	June 20, 2012
Chiyoko and a select few are invited to star in a TV wizardry show. There, she meets a former classmate of Gyubid's, Angolmois, who wishes to make Chiyoko her student.
11	"Let's Chill, Ms. Black Witch"; Transliteration: "Mattari Shimashō Kuromajo-san" (Japanese: まったりしましょう黒魔女さん)	June 27, 2012
Wanting to help her classmate Touko Miyase relax, Chiyoko gets Gyubid to help turn her school into a hot spring inn. She soon learns her classmate, Kyou Oogata, is really a wizard trained by Angolmois.
12	"Ms. Black Witch's Cinderella (Part 1)"; Transliteration: "Kuromajo-san no Shinderera (Zenpen)" (Japanese: 黒魔女さんのシンデレラ（前編）)	July 4, 2012
As Chiyoko's class goes on a trip to the beach, a strange being from the Spirit World named Akuma Joe warns Chiyoko that the bus will explode once it reaches the end of the tunnel. In order to save everyone, Chiyoko chants a spell putting everyone inside the Spirit World, where she must play the role of Cinderella in order to escape. As Chiyoko struggles, Gyubid appears to help her get to the ball.
13	"Ms. Black Witch's Cinderella (Part 2)"; Transliteration: "Kuromajo-san no Shinderera (Kōhen)" (Japanese: 黒魔女さんのシンデレラ（後編）)	July 11, 2012
As Chiyoko continues through the story, she and Gyubid discover the culprit is Kyou, who vows to conquer the Spirit World and make the entire class his pets. However, Chiyoko manages to get everyone to return home safely.
14	"Ms. Black Witch is a Big Sister? (Part 1)"; Transliteration: "Kuromajo-san wa Onēchan? (Zenpen)" (Japanese: 黒魔女さんはおねえちゃん？（前編）)	September 12, 2012
Chiyoko is asked by Megu to take her cousin, Momo, to the mall. Whilst at the arcade section, Momo coaxes Chiyoko's friend Touko Miyase into winning a mysterious hand puppet for her siblings. As Touko's siblings suddenly go missing, Momo is revealed to be Gyubid's underclassman, Touka Blossom, who is plotting to sacrifice Touko's siblings to summon a demon.
15	"Ms. Black Witch is a Big Sister? (Part 2)"; Transliteration: "Kuromajo-san wa Onēchan? (Kōhen)" (Japanese: 黒魔女さんはおねえちゃん？（後編）)	September 19, 2012
Chiyoko manages to reveal that Kyou is behind the incident. Touka reveals she was only pretending to be manipulated so she can try and steal away Kyou's powers once more using the puppet. Kyou attempts to have his cuckoo minions steal the puppet, but Chiyoko, Gyubid and Touka manage to recover it and place it on his hand again, sealing his powers once more. Afterwards, Touka starts living in Chiyoko's house to continue her black witch training.
16	"Ms. Black Witch's Class Visit"; Transliteration: "Kuromajo-san no Jugyō Sankan" (Japanese: 黒魔女さんの授業参観)	September 26, 2012
On Class Observation day, Gyubid disguises herself as Chiyoko's mother in order to investigate her teacher, Mr. Matsuoka, who's been possessed by a demon. After exorcising Matsuoka, they discover the culprit to be Akuma Joe, who was accidentally swallowed by Matsuoka.
17	"Ms. Black Witch's Sports Day (Part 1)"; Transliteration: "Kuromajo-san no Undōkai (Zenpen)" (Japanese: 黒魔女さんの運動会(前編))	October 3, 2012
As the class prepares for Sports Day, they hold a contest for who will be at the top of the human pyramid event. As athletic Suzuka Suzukaze sails through the contest, Gyubid deduces she is a black witch student. Chiyoko and Gyubid tail Suzuka to a hospital as she meets with her instructor, who desires Suzuka to perform a ritual in exchange for her brother's success in undergoing surgery.
18	"Ms. Black Witch's Sports Day (Part 2)"; Transliteration: "Kuromajo-san no Undōkai (Kōhen)" (Japanese: 黒魔女さんの運動会(後編))	October 10, 2012
Come Sports Day, after Gyubid casts an unknown spell on her, Chiyoko spots Angolmois speaking to another man, Count Leonare, about the purposed ritual, learning the truth that performing the ritual will not help Suzuka's brother. Before Chiyoko can warn Suzuka, Angolmois uses paralyzing magic to prevent her from interfering with the ritual which Suzuka begins to perform atop a human pyramid. However, the ritual fails as Suzuka's magic had mysteriously disappeared. As Suzuka's brother's operations goes smoothly, Chiyoko learns from Touka that Gyubid had used a forbidden magic to sever Suzuka's pact with Angolmois, the punishment of which is becoming trapped in a tree in the Spirit World.
19	"Ms. Black Witch's Halloween (Part 1)"; Transliteration: "Kuromajo-san no Harowīn 1" (Japanese: 黒魔女さんのハロウィーン・1)	October 17, 2012
In the run up to Halloween, Chiyoko learns from Touka that police from the Spirit World are hidden throughout the town, meaning Gyubid is still around town somewhere. They manage to find her in an antiques store. They are confronted by the Spirit World Police, but are aided by Akuma Joe, who tells of a conflict between the Public Magic School Gyubid graduated from and the Black Witch Academy, who got the police on their side. Feeling guilt for allegedly causing her school trouble due to her actions, Gyubid decides to travel to the Spirit World to help her school, with Chiyoko and Touka deciding to come along.
20	"Ms. Black Witch's Halloween (Part 2)"; Transliteration: "Kuromajo-san no Harowīn 2" (Japanese: 黒魔女さんのハロウィーン・2)	October 24, 2012
Upon arriving in the Spirit World, the gang, joined by Exnome, go to see Gyubid's principal, Melusine, who assures Gyubid that what she did was the right thing. As Gyubid and co try to escape into town, Chiyoko becomes separated from them and is forced to transform into a dried frog to avoid capture. However, she forgets how to transform back but is luckily noticed by Gyubid before she ends up getting eaten. Just then, they are caught by Leonare and the Spirit Police, where it is revealed that Exnome had betrayed them.
21	"Ms. Black Witch's Halloween (Part 3)"; Transliteration: "Kuromajo-san no Harowīn 3" (Japanese: 黒魔女さんのハロウィーン・3)	October 31, 2012
As Gyubid is put on trial, Chiyoko receives evidence from Melusine that can prove Gyubid's innocence. With help from Touka and a few others, Chiyoko breaks out of prison and arrives at the court room, revealing a letter Leonare wrote explaining how Gyubid was set up by him and managing to get Exnome to testify about its authenticity. After Leonare is taken into custody, the judge decrees that Gyubid should not leave Chiyoko's side until she graduates as a black witch.
22	"Ms. Black Witch as a Dog"; Transliteration: "Inu mo Arukeba Kuromajo-san" (Japanese: 犬も歩けば黒魔女さん)	November 14, 2012
As Gyubid brings up some magic cards that bring proverbs to life, a grammatical error on Chiyoko's part leads her, Gyubid and Touka to become transformed into dogs. As the card that can change them back ends up being taken by a crow, the gang chase after it. Chiyoko gets separated and meets Megu's pet dog Gumi, who ran away from Megu since he didn't want to wear silly clothes for a dog fashion show. They eventually manage to retrieve the card and return to human form.
23	"Ms. Black Witch is Scared of the Swimming Pool Ghost (Part 1)"; Transliteration: "Kuromajo-san pūru no yūrei ni bibiru (Zenpen)" (Japanese: 黒魔女さんプールの幽霊にビビる（前編）)	November 21, 2012
Chiyoko and Gyubid investigate reports of a ghost hanging around the school pool. Finding the ghost to merely be Naoki pulling a prank, Gyubid plans to do a revenge prank, only to find there is an actual monster lurking in the pool.
24	"Ms. Black Witch is Scared of the Swimming Pool Ghost (Part 2)"; Transliteration: "Kuromajo-san pūru no yūrei ni bibiru (Kōhen)" (Japanese: 黒魔女さんプールの幽霊にビビる（後編）)	November 28, 2012
Chiyoko, Gyubid and Touka soon discover that the culprit is Kyou, who has once again unsealed his powers. Chiyoko manages to perform a spell to cleanse Kyou's heart, although as a side effect she loses all of her manga. After the encounter, Gyubid arranges for Kyou's family to move in next door so she can keep an eye on him, with Touka acting as his little sister.
25	"Demon's Library"; Transliteration: "Akuma no Toshoshitsu" (Japanese: 悪魔の図書室)	December 5, 2012
Chiyoko is asked to investigate a supposedly possessed library, which changes the contents of its books to be about trees. They discover the culprit to be one of Chiyoko's schoolmates who became possessed by a tree demon, which Chiyoko and Gyubid soon exorcise.
26	"Ms. Black Witch Wasn't Built in a Day"; Transliteration: "Kuromajo-san wa Ichinichi ni shite Narazu" (Japanese: 黒魔女さんは一日にしてならず)	January 9, 2013
After learning a time control spell from Gyubid, Chiyoko attempts to use it to skip a PE lesson. However, after a bug messes up her finger motions, she ends up stuck in an infinite loop where she must do her PE lesson over and over. After going through multiple loops, she manages to break out of it after managing to do a successful vault.
27	"Suspicious Confectious Cake Contest (Part 1)"; Transliteration: "Okashi na Okashi na Kēki Gassen (Zenpen)" (Japanese: おかしなお菓子なケーキ合戦（前編）)	January 16, 2013
As a cake contest is held, Gyubid teaches Chiyoko a duplication spell to make a copy of herself to look for rare chestnuts for a mont blanc. Things soon get awkward as the copies start making copies of themselves that deviate further from the original with each duplication, so Gyubid and Chiyoko set off to capture all the copies.
28	"Suspicious Confectious Cake Contest (Part 2)"; Transliteration: "Okashi na Okashi na Kēki Gassen (Kōhen)" (Japanese: おかしなお菓子なケーキ合戦（後編）)	January 23, 2013
As Gyubid grows suspicious of Ogata purchasing a large amount of rice bowls, she and Chiyoko discover him bargaining with a banshi from the demon world, presumedly as a soldier for hire. After they step in to confront him, they learn from Touka that the banshi is actually a chef who Oogata asked to teach him how to make a mont blanc.
29	"A Ritual Sacrifice After School!?"; Transliteration: "Hōkago wa Ikenie no Gishiki?!" (Japanese: 放課後は生け贄の儀式?!)	January 30, 2013
Chiyoko gets dragged in by her friends to investigate the curious behaviour of their teacher, Matsuoka. After talking with Gyubid, Chiyoko fears that he may be engaging in a ritual to summon a demon. As it turns out, he was just learning how to make soup in secret.
30	"Valentine Panic"; Transliteration: "Barentain Panikku" (Japanese: バレンタイン・パニック)	February 13, 2013
As Valentine's Day approaches, Gyubid inadvertently feeds the chubby Iwata a herb that makes him seem attractive to everyone. This, Chiyoko must try to give him some chocolate with an antidote whilst facing up against all the other girls that are now infatuated with him.
31	"The Graduation Album Smells Like the Occult (Part 1)"; Transliteration: "Sotsugyō Arubamu wa Okaruto no Nioi (Zenpen)" (Japanese: 卒業アルバムはオカルトの匂い（前編）)	February 20, 2013
A strange occurrence appears to be interfering with the class photo shoot, which is soon revealed to be Ruru, who was inadvertently summoned by Gyubid in a magical game of shiritori.
32	"The Graduation Album Smells Like the Occult (Part 2)"; Transliteration: "Sotsugyō Arubamu wa Okaruto no Nioi (Kōhen)" (Japanese: 卒業アルバムはオカルトの匂い（後編）)	February 27, 2013
Ruru attempts to get revenge on Gyubid and Chiyoko by putting Naoki in harm's way so Gyubid will get expelled. With help from the class's otaku nerd, Chiyoko and Gyubid use the magical shiritori game to summon ingredients for an exorcism.

=== Season 2 ===
No.	Title	Original release date
33	"Ms. Black Witch and Cherry Trees"; Transliteration: "Kuromajo-san to Sakura no Ki" (Japanese: 黒魔女さんと桜の樹)	April 3, 2013
As Chiyoko and their friends have a flower-viewing party, one of their friends, Kokoro, is possessed by the spirit of a tree that has grown tired of becoming a garbage dump. Chiyoko manages to calm it down by using a cleaning spell, only for all the garbage to wind up in her own room.
34	"Ms. Black Witch's Stationery Shop"; Transliteration: "Kuromajo-san no Bunbōguten" (Japanese: 黒魔女さんの文房具店)	April 10, 2013
As Morikawa sets up a shop in the human world, she reveals Gyubid had accidentally sold a piece of spirit world candy that grants someone's desires to one of Chiyoko's classmates, leading to the classroom to be decorated with cute things. With bad things likely to happen if all the licker's wishes are granted, Chiyoko has to find who granted it in order to give them the antidote before they blow up into a balloon and inevitably explode.
35	"Ms. Black Witch and Joke Telling"; Transliteration: "Kuromajo-san to Rakugo" (Japanese: 黒魔女さんと落語)	April 17, 2013
Chiyoko and Gyubid must stop a pig from the spirit world that eats people's shadows, whose only weakness is laughter.
36	"Ms. Black Witch's Quarrel Tempest"; Transliteration: "Kuromajo-san no Kenka Ōsōdō" (Japanese: 黒魔女さんの喧嘩大騒動)	April 24, 2013
Chiyoko inadvertently casts a quarreling spell on a pair of siblings, which ends up spreading to the entire class.
37	"Tiny Black Witch"; Transliteration: "Chīsaku natta Kuromajo-san" (Japanese: 小さくなった黒魔女さん)	May 8, 2013
Whilst watching over Morikawa's shop, Chiyoko accidentally shrinks herself with a spirit world item.
38	"Ms. Black Witch's Grandma"; Transliteration: "Kuromajo-san no Obāchan" (Japanese: 黒魔女さんのおばあちゃん)	May 15, 2013
Choco's grandma visits Choco and give her an amulet which is helps her against Baba Yaga.
39	"Ms. Black Witch's Nightmare"; Transliteration: "Kuromajo-san to Yumemakura" (Japanese: 黒魔女さんと夢魔くら)	May 22, 2013
Choco gets trapped in her dreams. The only way out is to answer one of Makkura's riddles correctly.
40	"Ms. Black Witch's Favorite is Fortune Telling?"; Transliteration: "Kuromajo-san wa Uranai ga osuki?" (Japanese: 黒魔女さんは占いがお好き？)	May 29, 2013
41	"Ms. Black Witch Goes to Spirit World (Part 1)"; Transliteration: "Kuromajo-san Makai e Yuku (Zenpen)" (Japanese: 黒魔女さん魔界へゆく（前編）)	June 12, 2013
42	"Ms. Black Witch Goes to Spirit World (Part 2)"; Transliteration: "Kuromajo-san Makai e Yuku (Kōhen)" (Japanese: 黒魔女さん魔界へゆく（後編）)	June 19, 2013
43	"Ms. Black Witch and Red string of fate 1"; Transliteration: "Kuromajo-san to Akai Ito 1" (Japanese: 黒魔女さんと赤い糸・1)	June 26, 2013
44	"Ms. Black Witch and Red string of fate 2"; Transliteration: "Kuromajo-san to Akai Ito 2" (Japanese: 黒魔女さんと赤い糸・2)	July 3, 2013
45	"Ms. Black Witch and Red string of fate 3"; Transliteration: "Kuromajo-san to Akai Ito 3" (Japanese: 黒魔女さんと赤い糸・3)	July 10, 2013
46	"Ms. Black Witch is Good at Swimming?!"; Transliteration: "Kuromajo-san wa Suiei ga nigate?!" (Japanese: 黒魔女さんは水泳が苦手？！)	September 11, 2013
47	"It's Animals, Ms. Black Witch"; Transliteration: "Animaru desuyo Kuromajo-san" (Japanese: アニマルですよ黒魔女さん)	September 18, 2013
48	"Who's Smells, Ms. Black Witch"; Transliteration: "Nioi ga mieru Kuromajo-san" (Japanese: 匂いが見える黒魔女さん)	September 25, 2013
49	"Ms. Black Witch's School Play"; Transliteration: "Kuromajo-san no Gakugeikai" (Japanese: 黒魔女さんの学芸会)	October 9, 2013
50	"Ms. Black Witch's Autumn Festival (Part 1)"; Transliteration: "Kuromajo-san no Akimatsuri (Zenpen)" (Japanese: 黒魔女さんの秋祭り（前編）)	October 16, 2013
51	"Ms. Black Witch's Autumn Festival (Part 2)"; Transliteration: "Kuromajo-san no Akimatsuri (Kōhen)" (Japanese: 黒魔女さんの秋祭り（後編）)	October 23, 2013
52	"Ms. Black Witch's Dar's Magic"; Transliteration: "Kuromajo-san to Daruma-san" (Japanese: 黒魔女さんとダル魔さん)	October 30, 2013
53	"Ms. Black Witch's Christmas 1"; Transliteration: "Kuromajo-san no Kurisumasu 1" (Japanese: 黒魔女さんのクリスマス・1)	November 13, 2013
54	"Ms. Black Witch's Christmas 2"; Transliteration: "Kuromajo-san no Kurisumasu 2" (Japanese: 黒魔女さんのクリスマス・2)	November 20, 2013
55	"Ms. Black Witch's Christmas 3"; Transliteration: "Kuromajo-san no Kurisumasu 3" (Japanese: 黒魔女さんのクリスマス・3)	November 27, 2013
56	"Ms. Black Witch's Christmas 4"; Transliteration: "Kuromajo-san no Kurisumasu 4" (Japanese: 黒魔女さんのクリスマス・4)	December 4, 2013
(Choco elevated to third rank black witch.)
57	"Ms. Black Witch and Madame Tian Tian"; Transliteration: "Kuromajo-san to Madamu Ten-Ten" (Japanese: 黒魔女さんとマダム天天)	January 22, 2014
58	"Ms. Black Witch and the Bread Thief ?!"; Transliteration: "Kuromajo-san to Pan Dorobō ?!" (Japanese: 黒魔女さんとパン泥棒?!)	January 29, 2014
59	"Letter to Ms. Black Witch (Part 1)"; Transliteration: "Kuromajo-san no Otegami (Zenpen)" (Japanese: 黒魔女さんのお手紙（前編）)	February 12, 2014
60	"Letter to Ms. Black Witch (Part 2)"; Transliteration: "Kuromajo-san no Otegami (Kōhen)" (Japanese: 黒魔女さんのお手紙（後編）)	February 19, 2014
