= List of B-Daman Fireblast episodes =

B-Daman Fireblast, known as Cross Fight B-Daman in Japan (クロスファイト ビーダマンeS), is the second B-Daman anime of the Crossfire series, and the seventh B-Daman anime series overall. Premiering on October 7, 2012, in Japan. The series began airing on TV Tokyo in Japan starting October 7, 2012, and ending September 29, 2013. On March 27, 2015, B-Daman Fireblast was released in North America through a new app for iPhone and iPad, with an Android device release on April 13, 2015. On the day of release, the app featured access to the first 9 episodes in English.

== Episodes list ==
No.	English dub Title/Translated English Title Japanese Title	Original release date
1	"Crank Up the Heat! Garuburn! (Part 1)" / "I'm Getting Fired Up! Drive=Garuburn!"; Transliteration: "Meratsu to moe ruze i! Doraibu = Garubaan!" (Japanese: メラッと燃えるぜィ！ドライブ = ガルバーン！)	October 7, 2012
2	"Crank Up the Heat! Garuburn! (Part 2)" / "Vroom Vroom, I'll Sting You! Slot=Beedle!"; Transliteration: "Bunbun sasu ze i! Surotto=Biidoru!" (Japanese: ブンブン刺すぜィ！スロット・ビードル！)	October 14, 2012
3	"The Cool Guy Arrives! Samuru! (Part 1)" / "I Came Here to Relax! Sonic=Dravise!"; Transliteration: "Kūru ni kitazei! Sonikku = Dravise!" (Japanese: クールに来たぜィ！ソニック = ドラヴァイス)	October 21, 2012
4	"The Cool Guy Arrives! Samuru! (Part 2)" / "I'm Having Fun! DX Break Bomber 7"; Transliteration: "Chō tanoshī zei! DX bureikubonbā 7" (Japanese: チョー楽しいぜィ！DXブレイクボンバー7)	October 28, 2012
5	"Tune-Up Temptation! Misuru! (Part 1)" / "Our Tune-Up! Convert Barrel!"; Transliteration: "Chūn'nappu de i! Konbātobareru!" (Japanese: チューンナップでい！コンバートバレル！)	November 4, 2012
6	"Tune-Up Temptation! Misuru! (Part 2)" / "To Be The Best! Cross Fight!"; Transliteration: "Ittō toru ze ~i! Kurosufaito!" (Japanese: 一等とるぜィ！クロスファイト！)	November 11, 2012
7	"Tracking the Lone Wolf! Wolg! (Part 1)" / "Stray Wolf! Gunlock=Wolg!"; Transliteration: "Hagure Ōkami! Ganrokku=Vorugu!" (Japanese: はぐれ狼ィ！ガンロック = ヴォルグ！)	November 18, 2012
8	"Tracking the Lone Wolf! Wolg! (Part 2)" / "Across=Eagle! The Gluttonous Man Turns Up!"; Transliteration: "Akurosu=Iguru! Ōkui yarō ga yattekita zei!" (Japanese: アクロス = イグル！大食いヤローがやって来たぜィ！)	November 25, 2012
9	"Operation West Area! Crossfire! (Part 1)" / "I'll Do As Well in the West! Cross Fight!"; Transliteration: "Nishi demo yaru zei! Kurosufaito!" (Japanese: 西でもやるぜィ！クロスファイト！)	December 2, 2012
10	"Operation West Area! Crossfire! (Part 2)" / "Victory Blow! Across=Eagle!"; Transliteration: "Ichigeki hisshōda zei! Akurosu = iguru!" (Japanese: 一撃必勝だぜィ！アクロス = イグル！)	December 9, 2012
11	"An Enemy Approaches! Bakuga! (Part 1)" / "Road Fight Match! Arrow Wing Shot!"; Transliteration: "Rōdofaito de shōbu ya dei! Arō uingushotto!" (Japanese: ロードファイトで勝負やでぃ！アロー・ウイングショット！)	December 16, 2012
12	"An Enemy Approaches! Bakuga! (Part 2)" / "Strong Enemy Appears! Byakuga Shiranui"; Transliteration: "Kyōtekida ze ~i! Shiranuhi byakuga" (Japanese: 強敵だぜィ！不知火ビャクガ)	December 23, 2012
13	"Feel the Power! Raydra! (Part 1)" / "No Way! Buster Leg!"; Transliteration: "Masakada zei! Basutāreggu!" (Japanese: まさかだぜィ！バスターレッグ！)	January 6, 2013
14	"Feel the Power! Raydra! (Part 2)" / "I'll Protect It! DX Break Bomber 7!"; Transliteration: "Mamotte miseru zei! DX bureikubonbā 7!" (Japanese: 守ってみせるぜィ！DX ブレイクボンバー7！)	January 6, 2013
15	"Island Showdown! A Mysterious New B-Shot! (Part 1)" / "Arise! Break Ball"; Transliteration: "Agaru zei! Bureikubōru" (Japanese: アガるぜィ！ブレイクボール)	January 13, 2013
16	"Island Showdown! A Mysterious New B-Shot! (Part 2)" / "Raid! Stream=Drazeros!"; Transliteration: "Nagurikomida zei! Sutorīmu=dorazerosu!" (Japanese: 殴り込みだぜィ！ストリーム = ドラゼロス！)	January 20, 2013
17	"What a Jerk! Basara! (Part 1)" / "Good-for-Nothing! Basara Kurohuchi!"; Transliteration: "Rokudenashida zei! Kurohuchi Basara!" (Japanese: ロクデナシだぜィ！黒渕バサラ！)	January 27, 2013
18	"What a Jerk! Basara! (Part 2)" / "Revenge! Byakuga Shiranui! " Transliteration: "Ribenji suru zei! Shiranuhi Byakuga!" (Japanese: リベンジするぜィ！不知火ビャクガ！)	February 3, 2013
19	"Another Newcomer! Scorpio! (Part 1)" / "I'm Heating Up! Meteor Bomber " Transliteration: "Atsuku naru zei! Meteobonbā" (Japanese: 熱くなるぜィ！メテオボンバー)	February 10, 2013
20	"Another Newcomer! Scorpio! (Part 2)" / "Crush! I Came With Mach=Sasword"; Transliteration: "Kusha! To kitazei mahha=sasōdo" (Japanese: クシャッ! と来たぜィマッハ=サソード)	February 17, 2013
21	"The Competition Begins! B-Master Battle! (Part 1)" / "War! The B-Master Battle"; Transliteration: "Kaisen! Bmasutā batoru da zei" (Japanese: 開戦！Bマスターバトルだぜィ)	February 24, 2013
22	"The Competition Begins! B-Master Battle! (Part 2)" / "Formidable Blue Enemy! NEW Dracyan"; Transliteration: "Aoi kyouteki! NEW dorashian da zei" (Japanese: 青い強敵！NEWドラシアンだぜィ)	March 3, 2013
23	"Big Showdown! Garuburn vs. Dracyan! (Part 1)" / "The Blue Showdown! Garuburn VS Dracyan"; Transliteration: "Aoki taiketsuda zei! Garubān VS dorashian" (Japanese: 青き対決だぜィ！ガルバーンVSドラシアン)	March 10, 2013
24	"Big Showdown! Garuburn vs. Dracyan! (Part 2)" / "You're the Eastern B-Master"; Transliteration: "Kimi koso azuma no B masutāda" (Japanese: 君こそ東のBマスターだ)	March 17, 2013
25	"The Final Showdown! Garuburn vs. Dracyan! (Part 1)" / "Strong Ally! Magnum Arm!"; Transliteration: "Tsuyoi mikatada! Magunamumāmu!" (Japanese: 強い味方だ! マグナムマーム!)	March 24, 2013
26	"The Final Showdown! Garuburn vs. Dracyan! (Part 2)" / "Final Battle! Garuburn VS Dracyan"; Transliteration: "Saishū kessen! Garubān vs Dorashian" (Japanese: 最終決戦! ガルバーンvsドラシアン)	March 31, 2013
27	"Mystery! The Legend of Crestland! (Part 1)" / "Mystery! The Legend of Crest Land"; Transliteration: "Misuterī da zei! Kuresutorando no densetsu" (Japanese: ミステリーだぜィ! クレストランドの伝説)	April 7, 2013
28	"Mystery! The Legend of Crestland! (Part 2)" / "Competing with Byakuga! Assault=Dragren"; Transliteration: "Byakuga to shōbu! Asaruto = doraguren" (Japanese: ビャクガと勝負！アサルト = ドラグレン)	April 14, 2013
29	"White Tiger Showdown! Raydra! (Part 1)" / "White Tiger Showdown! The Despicable Bright Red Trap"; Transliteration: "Byakko no taiketsu! Makkade hiretsuna wana da zei" (Japanese: 白虎の対決! 真っ赤で卑劣なワナだぜィ)	April 21, 2013
30	"White Tiger Showdown! Raydra! (Part 2)" / "Awakening of the White Tigers! The Tiger Awakens"; Transliteration: "Byakko no mezame! Taigā kakusei da zei" (Japanese: 白虎のめざめ! タイガー覚醒だぜィ)	April 28, 2013
31	"Mode Change! Dragren! (Part 1)" / "Mode Change of Friendship! Assault=Dragren"; Transliteration: "Yūjō no mōdochenji da zei! Asaruto = doraguren" (Japanese: 友情のモードチェンジだぜィ! アサルト=ドラグレン)	May 5, 2013
32	"Mode Change! Dragren! (Part 2)" / "Farewell, My Friend! Gatling=Deathshell"; Transliteration: "Sarabatomoyo! Gatoringu = desushieru" (Japanese: さらば友よ！ガトリング = デスシエル)	May 12, 2013
33	"Taking Over! Tankshell! (Part 1)" / "Gatling=Deathshell - Controlling All the Areas"; Transliteration: "Gatoringu=desushieru zen eria o seiatsu seyo" (Japanese: ガトリング = デスシエル 全エリアを制圧せよ)	May 19, 2013
34	"Taking Over! Tankshell! (Part 2)" / "I'll Protect It! Cross Fight!"; Transliteration: "Mamotte miseru ze ~i! Kurosufaito!" (Japanese: 守ってみせるぜィ! クロスファイト!)	May 26, 2013
35	"Going Wild! Showdown with Tankshell! (Part 1)" / "Wild Challenge! Leohjya VS Deathshell"; Transliteration: "Yasei no charenji! Reōja VS desushieru" (Japanese: 野生のチャレンジ! レオージャVSデスシエル)	June 2, 2013
36	"Going Wild! Showdown with Tankshell! (Part 2)" / "Decisive Battle! Garuburn VS Deathshell"; Transliteration: "Kessen da zei! Garubān VS desushieru" (Japanese: 決戦だぜィ! ガルバーンVSデスシエル)	June 9, 2013
37	"An Unwelcome Guest! Tripress! (Part 1)" / "An Uninvited Guest! Dyna=Tripress"; Transliteration: "Manekarezaru Kyaku! Daina=Toripuresu" (Japanese: 招かれざる客！ダイナ = トリプレス)	June 16, 2013
38	"An Unwelcome Guest! Tripress! (Part 2)" / "The Ultimate Enemy! Triple=Gillusion"; Transliteration: "Kyūkyoku no teki! Toripuru = girushion" (Japanese: 究極の敵! トリプル = ギルシオン)	June 23, 2013
39	"Operation: Rescue! Phoenix! (Part 1)" / "Helping Out! Spike=Phoenix"; Transliteration: "Tasuke dasu zei! Supaiku = Fenikkusu" (Japanese: 助けだすぜィ! スパイク=フェニックス)	June 30, 2013
40	"Operation: Rescue! Phoenix! (Part 2)" / "Ultimate! Ultimate Drive=Garuburn!"; Transliteration: "Kyūkyoku da zei! Arutimettodoraibu = garubān!" (Japanese: 究極だぜィ! アルティメットドライブ=ガルバーン!)	July 7, 2013
41	"Bro Showdown! Garuburn vs. Gillusion! (Part 1)" / "Showdown of Brothers! Garuburn VS Gillusion!"; Transliteration: "Kyōdai taiketsu!Garubān vs girushion" (Japanese: 兄弟対決！ガルバーンvsギルシオン！)	July 14, 2013
42	"Bro Showdown! Garuburn vs. Gillusion! (Part 2)" / "Crush! Dark's Ambition!"; Transliteration: "Uchikudaku zei! Dāku no yabō" (Japanese: 打ち砕くぜィ！ダークの野望！)	July 21, 2013
43	"The Grand Prix Tournament! Phoenix! (Part 1)" / "Raising the Curtains! Phoenix Grand Prix"; Transliteration: "Kaimakuda zei! Fushichō guranpuri" (Japanese: 開幕だぜィ！不死鳥グランプリ)	July 28, 2013
44	"The Grand Prix Tournament! Phoenix! (Part 2)" / "Ultimate Showdown! Ultimate Rising=Dracyan"; Transliteration: "Kyūkyoku taiketsu! Kyūkyoku raijingu=dorashian" (Japanese: 究極対決！究極ライジング = ドラシアン)	August 4, 2013
45	"I Won't Back Down! Jenta vs. Roma! (Part 1)" / "I Won't Run Away! Genta VS Ryoma"; Transliteration: "Nige wa shinai ze ~i!Genta VS ryōma" (Japanese: 逃げはしないぜィ！ゲンタVSリョーマ)	August 11, 2013
46	"I Won't Back Down! Jenta vs. Roma! (Part 2)" / "Unreliable Match, Naoya VS Byakuga"; Transliteration: "Tayoranu shōbu Naoya VS byakuga" (Japanese: 頼らぬ勝負 ナオヤVSビャクガ)	August 18, 2013
47	"An Unexpected Discovery! Riki! (Part 1)" / "Unexpected Resurrection!? Spike=Phoenix"; Transliteration: "Yoki senu fukkatsu!?Supaiku = Fenikkusu!" (Japanese: 予期せぬ復活！？スパイク = フェニックス！)	August 25, 2013
48	"An Unexpected Discovery! Riki! (Part 2)" / "Looming Wall! Subaru & Dravise!"; Transliteration: "Tachihadakaru kabe! Subaru& doravu~aisu!" (Japanese: たちはだかる壁！スバル&ドラヴァイス！)	September 1, 2013
49	"The Semi-Final Showdown! Kamon vs. Roma! (Part 1)" / "A New Stage! The Semi-Final Kicks Off"; Transliteration: "Aratana sutēji! Junkesshō kaimakuda zei" (Japanese: 新たなステージ！準決勝開幕だぜィ)	September 8, 2013
50	"The Semi-Final Showdown! Kamon vs. Roma! (Part 2)" / "Here at Last! The Fiery Showdown of Brothers"; Transliteration: "Tsuini kita zei! Honō no kyōdai kessen" (Japanese: ついに来たぜィ！炎の兄弟決戦)	September 15, 2013
51	"The Final Match! Phoenix Grand Prix! (Part 1)" / "The Final Match! Phoenix Grand Prix"; Transliteration: "Kesshōsen da zei! Fenikkusuguranpuri" (Japanese: 決勝戦だぜィ！不死鳥グランプリ)	September 22, 2013
52	"The Final Match! Phoenix Grand Prix! (Part 2)" / "Showdown at the Summit! Kamon VS Kakeru!!"; Transliteration: "Chōjō kessenda ze ~i! Kamon vs Kakeru! !" (Japanese: 頂上決戦だぜィ！カモンvsカケル!!)	September 29, 2013
