= List of The Knight in the Area episodes =

The cover of the first DVD compilation of The Knight in the Area released by TV Asahi in Japan

The anime series The Knight in the Area is based on the manga series of the same name written by Hiroaki Igano and illustrated by Kaya Tsukiyama. The series is directed by Hirofumi Ogura and animated by Shin-Ei Animation. The story follows Kakeru Aizawa, who received the heart of his soccer prodigy older brother Suguru Aizawa after an accident. He aims to achieve his brother's dream of winning the World Cup.

The adaption of the series into an anime was first announced in Weekly Shōnen Magazine's 43rd issue in 2011. On January 5, 2012, Crunchyroll announced it will simulcast The Knight in the Area. The series aired between January 7, 2012, and September 28, 2012, on TV Asahi. The episodes used Higher Ground (ハイヤーグラウンド, Haiyā Guraundo) by S.R.S as the opening theme.

== Episode list ==
No.	Title	Original release date
1	"I Like Soccer"; Transliteration: "Boku wa Sakkā ga Daisukidesu" (Japanese: 僕はサッカーが大好きです)	January 7, 2012
Kakeru Aizawa is the manager for his middle school football team and younger brother to football prodigy Suguru Aizawa. His childhood friend, Nana Mishima, returns from the United States of America and enrolls into his class. That night, Kakero secretly practices football at the park and is challenged to a match by a masked stranger. The next day, Suguru has Kakeru enter a football match for the chance to join the regulars as a forward.
2	"Knight in the Area"; Transliteration: "Eria no Kishi" (Japanese: エリアの騎士)	January 14, 2012
Kakeru displays his skills as a forward by predicting and receiving Suguru's skilled passes. Whenever Kakeru has a chance to score, he changes his footing and hits the ball with his right leg reducing the power of the shot and prevents him from scoring. That night, Kakeru meets the masked stranger and explains how he injured a classmate with his left leg during a soccer match which is the cause to his playing style. That morning on the way to school, Suguru attempts to tell Kakeru he is the only forward able to receive his passes. In the middle of the conversation, they are hit by a truck.
3	"A Brother's Pulse"; Transliteration: "Ani no Kodō" (Japanese: 兄の鼓動)	January 21, 2012
In the coma, Kakeru relives the day he, along with Suguru and Nana, promise to join Japan's national soccer team. Meanwhile, Suguru is pronounced brain dead and his family agree to the hospital's decision to transplant his heart into Kakeru to save his life; Nana happens to overhear the decision. Two months later, Kakeru is discharged from the hospital and resigns from the soccer team. At the park, a girl is almost hit by a car but is saved when Kakeru kicks a ball and stops the driver.
4	"Last Pass"; Transliteration: "Rasuto Pasu" (Japanese: ラストパス)	January 28, 2012
Kakeru is unable to recall what happened when he kicked the ball, leading Nana to suspect Suguru's heart is the cause. At the hospital, Suguru's sport counselor, Ayaka Mine, examines Kakeru and reminds him to exercise for his heart. She secretly tasks Nana to watch for Suguru-like behavior from Kakeru possibly resulted from the transplant. That night, Kakeru learns that the masked stranger is Nana and that he received a heart transplant from Suguru. As Kakeru reads through Suguru's dairy, he discovers his brother's frustration with the forwards in Japan's national team and how he desires Kakeru to fill that position. The next day, Kakeru tells Nana he will enroll in Enoshima High where Ryuichi Araki, a midfielder with skills equal to Suguru, is located.
5	"Enoshima High Football Club?!"; Transliteration: "Enoshima Koukou Futtobōru Kurabu!?" (Japanese: 江ノ島高校フットボールクラブ!?)	February 4, 2012
A year passes and Kakeru and Nana are now students in Enoshima High school. They enroll in a soccer club, discovering that their club is the school's unofficial soccer team dubbed FC. They learn that before nationals tournament, FC competes with the official soccer team, dubbed SC, to determine who represents the school. Kakeru and Nana remain on the team after realizing FC's unconventional training is more effective than SC's. Meanwhile, Kakeru attempts to persuade Ryuichi to rejoin FC, who quit soccer and become overweight after losing to SC. Ryuichi explains the same frustration he felt as Suguru about the lack of skilled forwards to accept his passes but is inspired by Kakeru who offers to accept that position.
6	"Clash! FC vs SC!!"; Transliteration: "Gekitotsu ! FC tai SC !!" (Japanese: 激突! FC対SC!!)	February 11, 2012
The match between FC and SC to decide who will represent the school for nationals begins. Ryuichi fails to show up during the match and the team plays without him. After the first half, SC leads by two points. A player on FC is injured and is forced to stop playing. Kota Nakatsuka, Kakeru's middle school friend, quits the SC team and joins the FC team to sub for the player. The game resumes and Kakeru scores a goal as does SC ending the second half with 1:3 lead by SC. Ryuichi, having lost weight, joins FC and subs in for a player for the final half of the game.
7	"Return of the King"; Transliteration: "Ousama no Kikan" (Japanese: 王様の帰還)	February 18, 2012
Ryuichi dribbles by his opponents and scores a goal in the first few minutes. He leads the FC to create an opening allowing Kakeru to score a second point, tying the match at 3:3.
8	"Conclusion"; Transliteration: "Kecchaku" (Japanese: 決着)	February 25, 2012
Kakeru's final shot fails to enter the goal post and the game ends in a tie. FC's coach, Teppei Iwaki, discusses the future of the representation team with SC's coach, Coach Kondou, and the two decide to have Iwaki merge the team and select new regulars. A few days later during practice, Araki regained his lost weight. Consequently, Kakeru and Nana has Araki's mother put him on a diet. After receiving advice from Araki, Nana helps Kakeru overcome his habit of looking at the ball when dribbling. Once home, Nana meets a representative of Nadeshiko Japan who asks her to play for them.
9	"Panic at the Training Camp?!"; Transliteration: "Kyouka Gasshuku ha Oosawagi!?" (Japanese: 強化合宿は大騒ぎ！？)	March 2, 2012
Coach Iwaki arranges the team and sends them to a soccer training camp. Meanwhile, Nana subs in for a player in Nadeshiko Japan during an exhibition game and helps them win against Miami Hurricane, a team from America's female pro league. She later returns to the camp where Iwaki arranges a game of courage which quickly concludes.
10	"Little Witch"; Transliteration: "Ritoru Wicchi" (Japanese: リトル・ウィッチィ)	March 10, 2012
During gym class, Nana is assigned to play soccer with the boys where displays her skills and wins the match. When Kakeru and Nana practice soccer at the park, she scolds him for his aloof attitude on improving his schools and reminds him the two, along with Suguru, promised to play in the nationals. The next day, Nana's recruitment to Nadeshiko Japan becomes public knowledge. Kakeru and his friends attend Japan's exhibition match against a team from German women's Bundesliga, which concludes in a draw. Kakeru becomes depressed, realizing he is the one out of three who has yet to become a national player. Nana later cheers him up and tells him to reach his goal at his own pace.
11	"The Division of the Soccer Club"; Transliteration: "Sakkābu Bunretsu" (Japanese: サッカー部分裂)	March 17, 2012
Team FC's laxed training regime causes the three of the members from the SC club to quit. During practice, a scuffle between Matoba Kaoru and Michiro Takase occurs. Later, Kaoru has Kakeru and Nana accompany him so he can apologize to Takase. There, they learn about Takasa's past from his siblings, and how he had to abandon basketball for soccer in order to attempt the pro leagues to support his family. Kaoru decides to drop his apology after concluding Takasa is playing soccer for money. That night, Kakeru sees Takasa practicing soccer at the park and calls Kaoru where the three practice together. The next day, during practice, they discover most of the SC members have quit.
12	"Enoshima Soccer Club Reborn"; Transliteration: "Shinnamae no Kou Sakkābu" (Japanese: 新生江ノ高サッカー部)	March 24, 2012
Kakeru invites SC to join their practice at a stadium rented out by Iwaki. The leaders of SC, Ryoma Oda, Yugi Sawamura, and Go Kaiouji, show up but do not attend. They run into Kondou who tells them Iwaki's coaching works. To demonstrate this, Kondou takes the three to them to view FC's match against Kamakura College. He explains Iwaki allowed Araki to keep his weight and forced him to play in matches; his extra weight will strain and improve his cardiovascular systems while his exhaustion will give him a natural incentive to lose weight. Accepting Iwaki's coaching style, SC rejoins the club where afterwards, the bench player for Inter-High is revealed.
13	"Raising the Curtain! Inter-High Qualifiers"; Transliteration: "Kaimaku! Intā Hai Yosen" (Japanese: 開幕！インターハイ予選)	March 31, 2012
The Inter-High match begins and Enoshima faces Shonan high-school. After a prolonged game, Enoshima are the victor by a long shot. That night, Nana has Kakeru wear a mask to restrain his vision. As a result, Kakeru accidentally performs a high quality feint that passes Nana.
14	"The Mythical Feint"; Transliteration: "Maboroshi no Feinto" (Japanese: 幻のフェイント)	April 7, 2012
Kakeru tries to master the feint through two practice matches but fails. Later, Kakeru meets Koichi Hibino, a person whom is the cause of Kakeru's fear of using his left leg. Hibino tells Kakeru despite having his ligament permanently torn by him, his school will defeat Enoshima.
15	"Strong Opponent, Tsujido"; Transliteration: "Kyouteki?! Tsujidou Gakuen" (Japanese: 強敵！？辻堂学園)	April 14, 2012
Enoshima plays against Tsujido whose strategy prevents Araki from passing and with their powerful throw-ins, places them two points in the lead after the first half. During the second half, Kakeru collides with an opposing team which causes a change in his personality and play-style.
16	"The Empty Three Seconds"; Transliteration: "Kuuhaku no 3 Byoukan" (Japanese: 空白の3秒間)	April 21, 2012
Nana and Araki recognize Kakeru is playing like Suguru. While in that state, Kakeru bypasses Tsujido's defenses and passes the ball to Araki who is unable to reach the ball in time with his body. Kakeru soon returns to normal and has no recollection of what transpired after the collision. However, his penetration forces Tsujido to become more defensive, allowing Araki to score a goal. Enoshima scores a second goal through a series of passes and Kakeru scores the winning goal with the feint he had been developing.
17	"Leonardo Silva"; Transliteration: "Reonarudo Shiruba" (Japanese: レオナルド・シルバ)	April 28, 2012
Kakeru visits Ayaka who explains his change in personality was influenced by Suguru's heart. Elsewhere, Leonardo Silva, an Under-17 Brazilian national soccer player, watches a recording of Kakeru's previous game and decides to visit him. That night at the park, he challenges Kakeru to a game of keep away and attempts to call out Suguru's personality. He succeeds but interference of Nana causes Kakeru to return to normal. Satisfied, Silva departs and reminisces about his first meeting with Suguru and how they never concluded their match against each other to determine who is the better soccer player.
18	"Seven's Rival"; Transliteration: "Sebun no Raibaru" (Japanese: セブンのライバル)	May 5, 2012
Nadeshiko Japan is scheduled to play against JWSL during a selection match. Nadeshiko's is led by a substitute coach who decides to let the players decide amongst themselves the position they want to play. They also receive a new player named Mai Muraisaki, a highly skilled player who uses solo plays to garner attention to herself. Initially at a disadvantage against JWSL, Nadeshiko eventually win after the players begin to work together. The next day, Enoshima prepares to face Shonan High, Hibino's team.
19	"Iron Wall!! Four Rows"; Transliteration: "Teppeki !! Fōa Rouzu" (Japanese: 鉄壁！！フォーアロウズ)	May 12, 2012
Araki has regained his peak condition and displays his abilities by dribbling the ball to the Shonan's goalpost on his own. Shonan High begins their plan by having some of their players permanently mark specific players from Enoshima to prevent them from receiving passes. Kakeru fails to score goals as he hesitates to kick while Hibino is close to him. During the match, Shonan receives a direct free kick which Kakeru receives to the head.
20	"Appearance of the Phi Trick"; Transliteration: "Fai Torikku Tanjou" (Japanese: Φトリック誕生)	May 19, 2012
During the second half, Enoshima and Shonan tie the game by 1:1. Kakeru begins to hear Suguru's voice who advises him on his play, allowing him to score a second goal with his feint dubbed as the Phi Trick by the announcer. The next day, he runs into Mai who is seeking information on Nana.
21	"Festival Music is the Melody of Love!?"; Transliteration: "Matsuri Hayashiha Koi no Shirabe !?" (Japanese: 祭囃子は恋の調べ！？)	May 26, 2012
The Enoshima soccer team attends a nearby festival. While most of the team is occupied in the games, Kakeru is picked up by Mai who went to the festival alone. After Kakeru leaves due to her teasing, Mai tries to befriend Nana while keeping her facade. The next day, Enoshima prepare for their match against Yoin.
22	"Emperor Tooru Asuka"; Transliteration: "Koutei Asuka Tooru" (Japanese: 皇帝 飛鳥 享)	June 2, 2012
The match between Enoshima and Yoin begins. Enoshima scores the first goal after Kakeru uses the Phi Trick. The team captain of Yoin, Tooru Asuka, had already predicted the situations and adjusts the team accordingly. Yoin's Haruki Onimaru then scores a goal from Enoshima's corner and ties the game.
23	"Desperate Situation"; Transliteration: "Zettai Zetsumei" (Japanese: 絶体絶命)	June 9, 2012
Yoin scores a second goal using a similar situation. During the second half, Enoshima pushes Yoin's defense back by attempting distant shots at the goal. Kakeru breaks through the defense and prepares to score until he is intercepted by Asuka who scores a goal off-screen making it 3:1 with Yoin in the lead.
24	"Tenacity to Win"; Transliteration: "Shouri he no Shuunen" (Japanese: 勝利への執念)	June 23, 2012
Enoshima realize Asuka countered Kakeru's shot and sent it towards Onimaru who scored the goal. As the game drags on, Kakeru falls into despair and Suguru's personality takes over. Suguru scores two goals, and ties the score with four minutes to spare.
25	"Fierce Battle!! Finale"; Transliteration: "Gekitou!! Fināre" (Japanese: 激闘！！フィナーレ)	June 30, 2012
When Kakeru attempts to score another goal, he collapses after his decision conflicts with Suguru's. After being discharged from the hospital, he learns Yoin won when Araki missed a shot during a penalty shoot-out. Kakeru and Araki blame themselves for the loss but are encouraged by their teammates to train for the Winter tournament.
26	"Professional"; Transliteration: "Purofesshonaru" (Japanese: プロフェッショナル)	July 14, 2012
Kakeru goes to watch the semifinal match featuring Silva's Syuku High. There, he meets Araki who asks him to prevent Suguru from interfering with their games and to focus on his skills as a forward. Meanwhile, Nadeshiko Japan's training camp is moved to Kamakura allowing Mai to spend more with Enoshima's soccer team. On the way home, Mai sees a man she knows and ends up hiding in fear. The next day, Araki reveals he has regained his weight to continue his cardio-training.
27	"Ryoma Goes!"; Transliteration: "Ryoushin Gayuku!" (Japanese: 涼真がゆく！)	July 21, 2012
Enoshima's soccer club vacation at a beach; they are forced to work at a restaurant in return for housing. There, Araki forces Ryoma to compete and have the winner confess to the restaurant owner's daughter. Ryoma wins and prepares to turn her down only to realize she was already dating someone.
28	"The Summit Battle! Kamakura vs. Shukyu"; Transliteration: "Choujou Kessen! Kama Gaku VS Ke Gaku" (Japanese: 頂上決戦！鎌学VS蹴学)	July 28, 2012
The inter-high finals between Kamakura and Shukyu begins. Kamakura leads by one point at the end of the first half and ties during the second half. The game goes into loss time where Silva scores the winning goal.
29	"Partly Cloudy"; Transliteration: "Kumori Nochi Hare" (Japanese: くもりのち晴れ)	August 4, 2012
Enoshima's soccer club receives a new training regimen for the upcoming tournament. Meanwhile, Mai is unable to play co-operatively with her teammates and after a dispute with her team, decides to meet Kakeru. There, after Mai does more flirting than Kakeru can mentally handle, Nana arranges a conversation with Kakeru so Mai is able to eavesdrop. Learning that Nana wishes Mai to become her friend and a part of their team, Mai leaves with an uplifted spirit. At home, Kakeru's parents inform him he had been selected to become a part of Japan national under-16 football team.
30	"U–16 Representative Training Camp"; Transliteration: "U–16 Daihyou Gasshuku" (Japanese: U–16 代表合宿)	August 11, 2012
Araki receives the same invitation and reminisces about his first meeting with Suguru. At the training camp, the players compete and thirty players are chosen to stay after several exhibition matches. Twenty players are chosen to participate in the friendly match against America's U-16 team; Kakeru, Araki, Hibino, and Saeki Yusuke are part of the chosen members.
31	"World Match Debut"; Transliteration: "Sekai Sen Debyū" (Japanese: 世界戦デビュー)	August 18, 2012
After a scoreless first half in which the Japanese U-16 team looks sluggish Araki and Kakeru are placed in. Scoring chances begin to open up for Japan. Kakeru uses his Phi Trick to get a scoring opportunity, but his shot is blocked. After his second Phi Trick is stolen Kakeru is removed from the game. Japan goes on to win 3-0. Araki is chosen for the team and Kakeru is given the assignment to improve for a future shot at the U-17 and U-20 Japanese team. Upon returning to Enoshima Seven gives Kakeru a trick she thinks may make his Phi Trick unbeatable, and the Enoshima teammates begin helping Araki lose weight knowing if he doesn't lose weight he'll be cut from the Japanese U-16 team before the first match.
32	"Welcome Home, Romeo-sama?!"; Transliteration: "Okaerinasaimase, Romio sama!?" (Japanese: お帰りなさいませ、ロミオ様！？)	August 25, 2012
It is festival day at Enoshima High and each club has broken out into various activities. Most of the soccer club is working at the Maid's Cafe until they are forced to wear maid's outfits. Just as most of the players decide to leave due to the maid's outfits, the theatre club comes beginning for assistance. All but one member in the club has gotten ill from spending the previous day under a waterfall. Now the soccer club must learn the play and act it out in front of hundreds of people within an hours time. With the help of the broadcasting club acting as emissaries, the soccer club might just be able to pull off one of the most ridiculous performances anyone has ever seen with Kakeru as Romeo and Araki as Juliet.
33	"New Challenger"; Transliteration: "Arata na Kyouteki" (Japanese: 新たな強敵)	September 1, 2012
Kamakura invites Enoshima out for a two-day training camp. The team is able to see how much their skills have improved, but they also worry because it's Araki's last match before leaving for the U-16 matches with Japan. Should they advance to the World Championships, he won't return to the semifinals. Kakeru learns his Phi Trick doesn't work against Kamakura's players and wonders how he can change it. The team studies who their quarterfinal opponent will be, and as the night ends they have a practice match of beach soccer.
34	"Raise the Curtain! High School Championship"; Transliteration: "Kaimaku! Koukou Senshuken" (Japanese: 開幕！高校選手権)	September 8, 2012
The Winter tournament begins and Enoshima defeats their first opponent and Nadeshiko Japan also wins in their match. Later, Yoin's Asuka tells Kakeru he will not lose unless Suguru takes over again. Nana counters that a new Phi trick will be developed by then.
35	"New Total Football"; Transliteration: "Neo Tōtaru Futtobōru" (Japanese: ネオ・トータルフットボール)	September 15, 2012
Enoshima defeats another team and advances in the tournament while Shonan High loses to Sagamigura High and is eliminated. Soon after, Araki and the U-16 national team travels to Asia for the tour. Meanwhile, Iwaki arranges to have Shonan imitate Sagamigura's play style to train Enoshima for the upcoming match. The match begins and Sagamigura uses an improved strategy for the match.
36	"Storm Warning"; Transliteration: "Boufuu keihou Hatsurei!" (Japanese: 暴風警報発令！)	September 21, 2012
Sagamigura are able to take multiple shots at the goals which all but one are blocked by Enoshima's goalkeeper. While the game continues, Nana and Iwaki attempt to figure out how to counter Sagamigura. Iwaki realizes Sagamigura's weakness is in the center and plans to have Kakeru use it to their advantage.
37	"Kickoff"; Transliteration: "Kikkuofu!!" (Japanese: キックオフ！！)	September 28, 2012
Enoshima are able to bypass Sagamigura's circle of defense scoring a goal and forcing the opponent to change strategy. After a second goal by Enoshima, time runs out and Enoshima is the victor. Kakeru and Nana discuss about their experiences and goals where she encourages him to work towards Nationals. The series ends with Enoshima starting their match against Yoin in the finals.

== Volume DVDs ==
Bandai Visual gathered the episodes and released them into DVD volumes. The first DVD volume was released on May 25, 2012.

Bandai Visual (Japan, Region 2 DVD)
Volume	Episodes	Release date	Ref.
Volume 1	1–3	May 25, 2012	
Volume 2	4–6	June 22, 2012	
Volume 3	7–9	July 27, 2012	
Volume 4	10–12	August 25, 2012	
Volume 5	13–15	September 21, 2012	
Volume 6	16–18	October 26, 2012	
