= List of Space Battleship Yamato 2199 episodes =

This is a list of episodes for the Japanese anime military science fiction television series Star Blazers: Space Battleship Yamato 2199. It is a remake of the first Space Battleship Yamato television series created by Yoshinobu Nishizaki in 1974, known in the United States as Star Blazers. The first episode aired on April 6, 2012, on Family Gekijo channel. The series was screened back-to-back in theaters across Japan, a few episodes at a time prior to release on home video, and started airing on television on April 7, 2013. The series is confirmed to be marketed internationally under the name Star Blazers 2199.

== Episodes ==
No.	Title	Original release date
1	"The Messenger from Iscandar"; Transliteration: "Isukandaru no Shisha" (Japanese: イスカンダルの使者)	April 6, 2012 (pre-air); April 7, 2013 (Note: Episodes 1 and 2 were released as a fifty-minute anime film called Dai-Isshō Harukanaru Tabidachi (Chapter 1: "The Long Journey") premiering in Japanese cinemas on April 7, 2012)
In the year 2199, Earth is ravaged by attacks from alien beings of the planet, Garmilas, which have devastated the surface of the Earth and forced what remains of mankind to take shelter underground. To save the Earth, the last of the Earth's space forces must distract the Garmilan forces while a non-Garmilan ship, code named Amaterasu, races to Mars to deliver the Wave Motion Activation Core to the Earthlings. While Captain Mamoru Kodai contains the enemy attack to allow fellow captain Juzo Okita to escape with his forces, Mamoru's brother Susumu and his friend Daisuke Shima investigate the Amaterasu that crashed on Mars. Inside the escape capsule from the crashed ship is a deceased alien female, the lone messenger sent to Earth to make a critical delivery to the Earthlings. Susumu and Daisuke return to Earth on the Kirishima, their only ship to return from the battle at Pluto. On the Kirishima, Susumu learns of his brother's death. When the Kirishima reaches Earth, Susumu looks for Captain Okita to confirm whether his brother was sacrificed in vain, meeting Yuki Mori, who directs him to the hospital wing, on the way. Susumu confronts Okita, who claims responsibly for leading Mamoru to his death. Later, Susumu and Daisuke gets a look at the new Cosmo Zero ship-borne fighters. And when a Garmilan carrier was spotted, they took the plane--actually, that of top ace Saburo Kato--out to intercept the carrier. Unfortunately, its weapons systems were unarmed, and crash lands when it developed engine failure. As the two walked out of the plane's wreckage, Susumu climbed up a crest to see the remains of an ancient battleship, sunk over a century ago.
2	"Toward a Sea of Stars"; Transliteration: "Waga Omomuku wa Hoshi no Unabara" (Japanese: 我が赴くは星の海原)	April 14, 2013
Susumu and Daisuke brings the Wave Motion Activation Core to Earth which allows mankind to complete its first interstellar spaceship, the "BBY-01 Yamato". With Okita as the captain, Daisuke as the navigator, and Susumu as its tactical officer, the Yamato is commissioned to travel to planet Iscandar, in the Large Magellanic Cloud, with orders to retrieve a device able to restore Earth's environment. Before the Yamato gets fully boarded by its crew, Saburo met with Susumu, warning him that, even if he is his commanding officer, he will never forgive him if he leads any of his men to a needless death. Before the Yamato could take off, it must be started by a huge amount of energy, and then it must counter an inbound Garmilan interplanetary ballistic missile targeted at them.
3	"Escape from the Jupiter Sphere"; Transliteration: "Mokusei-ken Dasshutsu" (Japanese: 木星圏脱出)	April 21, 2013 (Note: Episodes 3 to 6 were originally released together as an anime film called Dai-nishō: Taiyōken no Shitō (Chapter 2: "Desperate Struggle in the Heliosphere") premiering in Japanese cinemas on June 30, 2012)
On Garmilan-occupied Pluto, Gelf Gantz suggests sending out a fleet after the Yamato. Commander Valke Schultz turns down the suggestion, preferring first to see what the Yamato does before attempting anything. After making the first ever, albeit interrupted, space warp humankind ever attempted, the main engine malfunctions as the Yamato is caught in Jupiter's gravity well. Captain Okita orders the Yamato to land on a floating continent orbiting the planet to make repairs. On the floating continent, Captain Okita orders an away team to go out and collect samples from the continent. After analyzing some of the plant samples collected, Executive Officer Shiro Sanada discovers that the floating continent is artificially made by the Garmilans. Meanwhile, Raleta, commander of the Garmilas resupply base on the floating continent, gets a message from Gantz, ordering her to dispatch a combat fleet of four ships to attack the Yamato. The Yamato destroys three of the four attacking ships, and then takes off from the continent. Captain Okita orders Susumu to test fire the Wave Motion Gun at the floating continent. Nobody at that time is certain of what would be the result, but Engineer Hikozaemon Tokugawa tells XO Sanada that it's now or never. Susumu fires the gun, destroying not just the base, but the entire continent. Yasuo Nanbu is thrilled at the power of the weapon, but Captain Okita forbears that the Wave Motion Gun is for self-defense only, questioning whether they have done the right thing.
4	"Gravestone on a Frozen Field"; Transliteration: "Hyougen no Hakajirushi" (Japanese: 氷原の墓標)	April 28, 2013
When the Yamato lands on the Saturnian moon Enceladus to mine some much needed Cosmonite and investigate an automated distress call, Analyzer, radar operator Yuki and medic Makoto Harada, with Susumu as escort, encounter the remains of a crashed Earth ship. They are ambushed by Garmiloids (Garmilan androids) and must fight to escape. Help from the Yamato is delayed because they themselves, along with the mining crew, are under attack. In the chaos of battle, Susumu fumbles his sidearm but quickly scrounges up a pistol which he got to know, upon closer inspection, as his brother's. He shoots the built-up ice covering the vessel's exterior markings to confirm his suspicions, and it read Yukikaze, the same name as that of his brother's ship. Unable to find any further clue about Mamoru's whereabouts, they plant a memorial marker to the crew of the Yukikaze and continue their quest.
5	"The Trap on all Sides"; Transliteration: "Shikaku Naki Wana" (Japanese: 死角なき罠)	May 5, 2013
Before leaving the Solar System, the Yamato launches an attack to destroy the Garmilan facilities on Pluto to stop their bombardment of Earth with planet bombs. However, the ship ends up falling for a surprise attack from the enemy's secret weapon, which is the same device that creates the planet bombs, and the crew of Yamato sends their pilot squadron to shut down the Garmilan base.
6	"The Sun Sets on Pluto"; Transliteration: "Meiou no Rakujitsu" (Japanese: 冥王の落日)	May 12, 2013
Having deceived the Garmilans to believe that the Yamato was destroyed for sure, and this time armed with the knowledge that the enemy is using a beam weapon that uses satellites, the ship takes the opportunity to stage a counterattack after the recon pilots find the location of the main Garmilan base. It is here that the Yamato engaged in undersea operations--that is, turning the Yamato into Submarine Mode--and shutting down one of the enemy's reflecting satellites, before returning to Ship Mode upon the recon pilots' discovery of the Base. The recon pilots shut down the emitters that cloak the base in an aurora-like camouflage, exposing the base. The Yamato destroys the Planet Bomb Laser emitter when Susumu spots a beam coming from the bay near the base. The destruction of the base puts an end to radiation bombs falling on Earth, and Earth forces thank the crew for that. Meanwhile, with Schultz's premature announcement of their "victory" to their leader, Abelt Desler, their Leader, first hears of this ship from Earth capable of a Geschtam Jump (what the Garmillans call a "warp jump").
7	"Farewell to the Solar System"; Transliteration: "Taiyou-ken ni Wakare wo Tsugete" (Japanese: 太陽圏に別れを告げて)	May 19, 2013 (Note: Episodes 7 to 10 were originally released together as Dai-sanshō: Hateshinaki Kōkai (Chapter 3: "The Endless Voyage"), in twelve Japanese theaters from October 13 through October 26, 2012.)
With the Garmilan attacks on Earth stopped, the Yamato prepares to leave the Solar System after giving the crew members a last chance to contact their relatives they left behind before resuming their journey to Iscandar, as well as a "heliosphere-crossing" ceremony. Susumu and newly-transferred pilot Akira Yamamoto volunteered to replace two personnel working on the battleship's damaged exterior, since there's no one on Earth they can call anyway. The last calls are often upsetting to the crew. Warrant Officer Yuria Misaki then debuts YRA Radio Yamato.
8	"Wish Upon a Star"; Transliteration: "Hoshi ni Negai wo" (Japanese: 星に願いを)	May 26, 2013
An operation staged by the Garmilan Leader Abelt Desler forces the Yamato to navigate too close to a star in a desperate attempt to escape, maneuvering around solar flares that can instantly destroy the ship while being pursued by the enemy forces who are seeking redemption for the destruction of their Garmilan base on Pluto. During this ordeal, Captain Okita collapsed on his dashboard, prompting Dr. Sakezo Sado to rush to the bridge, but the captain was up and wearing his space suit before he could arrive. Dr. Sado reminded Captain Okita that he is tasked with keeping him alive and tells him to obey his orders, all while not giving any clue to the other members of the crew as to his exact condition. Meanwhile, General Garemund Goer scolded Shultz and his crew that fired the weapon used on the Yamato when it was consumed by the solar flares. Sick and tired of his mouth, Shultz was already seething in anger when Gantz stepped forward and turned the transmission off. Shultz then ordered a final pursuit of the Yamato, but ended up being consumed by the solar flares. Desler awarded posthumous promotions to them as well as honorary citizenships to their families as a result. General Velte Talan, who is involved in Weapons Development, notices the weapon the Yamato used to blow a hole through a solar prominence so that they can escape. Miezela Cerestella, Desler's propaganda officer, dismissed it, however.
9	"Clockwork Prisoner"; Transliteration: "Tokeijikake no Ryoshuu" (Japanese: 時計仕掛けの虜囚)	June 2, 2013
One of the Garmilan androids retrieved by the Yamato on Enceladus is reassembled and activated in an attempt to learn more about their enemies. Analyzer, the Yamato's own robot, develops a rapport with the android. As the android secretly explores its surrounding medium, it encounters a mysterious entity. Analyzer manages to befriend the Android which then reveals its meeting with the shipboard "goddess". However, when the android escapes its confinement, the rest of the crew enters into an alarmed state of alert and searches for it. This episode has many elements from the books by Isaac Asimov and Philip K. Dick on androids.
10	"Graveyard of the Universe"; Transliteration: "Daiuchuu no Hakaba" (Japanese: 大宇宙の墓場)	June 9, 2013
General Garemund Goer is so angered over his dismissal as Commander of the Milky Way Theater that he sent his entire fleet to hunt down the Yamato, regardless of anything. Meanwhile, 'The Yamato falls into a dimensional rift and finds itself unable to escape. A Garmilan ship, the EX-178, led by Captain Valus Lang (actually, a second-class Garmilan), is also trapped there, and approaches the Yamato. Both crews come to a temporary ceasefire while they work together to escape. Lower Storm Leader Melda Ditz, the daughter of the Supreme Commander of Garmilan Astrofleets who was onboard that ship at that time, remains on the Yamato as part of the agreement. A bit of tension, especially between Melda and Akira, occurs when the traction beam from the Garmilan ship towing the Yamato was momentarily disengaged, due to the interference of Imperial Guard Storm Leader Paren Nerge, who is onboard the Garmilan vessel, interfering with the ship's operations. One of the personnel loyal to Captain Lang shot Paren before he could proceed any further, though he has already harassed the communications officer into sending a hyperspace message alerting General Goer. After the EX-178 and the Yamato escape the dimensional rift, General Goer charges at them with his fleet, even blasting Captain Lang's ship, much to the shock of the crew of the Yamato. Instead of fighting Goer's fleet, the Yamato runs away, while luring the fleet near the near-closing dimensional rift. The dimensional rift temporarily reopens, swallowing all of Goer's fleet. As those on the bridge salute the wreckage of Captain Lang's ship, Akira informs Melda that her place of origin is gone, and is now trapped on the Yamato.
11	"A World I Once Saw"; Transliteration: "Itsuka Mita Sekai" (Japanese: いつか見た世界)	June 16, 2013 (Note: Episodes 11 to 14 were originally released together as Dai-yonshō: Ginga Henkyō no Kōbō (Chapter 4: "Defense of the Galactic March"), in twelve Japanese theaters from January 12 through January 26, 2013.)
Melda, a Garmilan pilot under the custody of the Yamato, is given a medical examination by Dr. Sado and is found to be identical to humans at the DNA level, except for the blue skin. She claims that their attack on Earth was not unprovoked, and that it was the Terrons, as the Garmilans call humans, who first fired without warning during the first contact between both races years before. Daisuke, whose father was killed in the attack, does not believe her at all until Susumu Yamazaki, the sole survivor of his father's ship and is currently working in the Engine Room, broke a gag order that revealed to him the truth about what really happened that day: the day when Captain Okita, then an Admiral, was stripped of command of a fleet of space battleships on the spot for refusing to obey Central Command orders to fire at the Garmilan vessels first. Later, Akira and Melda had one last dogfight, where Akira's plane developed engine failure and had to eject. Melda rescues her as Akira floats in space. At the end, Melda is given four days of food supplies and leaves the ship on friendly terms, passing on to Susumu a message for Akira; while Akira gets to spend six days in the brig.
12	"What Lies Beyond"; Transliteration: "Sono Hate ni Aru mono" (Japanese: その果てにあるもの)	June 23, 2013
The Garmilan General Elk Domel is called back from the front lines by Desler and reassigned to the Milky Way Theater with orders to stop the Yamato. When Domel asked a favor from Admiral Gul Ditz, the Supreme Commander of Garmilan Astrofleets, he and General Velte Talan warned him that his sudden rise could attract him enemies. Meanwhile, Susumu and Daisuke have a little spat, irritating Captain Okita and punishing them by having them scrub the ship's floors and the Wave Motion Gun barrel. Later, as the Yamato approaches the edge of the galaxy, it comes under attack by an extra-dimensional submarine, the one specially requested by Domel.
13	"The Wolf from Another Dimension"; Transliteration: "Ijigen no ōkami" (Japanese: 異次元の狼)	June 30, 2013
Taking shelter in an asteroid cluster, the crew of the Yamato discover the enemy's ability to hide their vessel in sub-space and come up with countermeasures against them. It involved Susumu taking off on a Seagull against orders to deploy some sonar beacons that helped a lot in spotting the enemy. It is during this time that Captain Okita collapsed and was taken into emergency surgery.
14	"Whisper of the Witch"; Transliteration: "Majo wa Sasayaku" (Japanese: 魔女はささやく)	July 7, 2013
Returning from a reconnaissance mission, Susumu and Yuki find a drifting Yamato with the rest of the crew missing. As the two look for clues about what happened, they must face an enemy that can use their own memories against them, assisted by an unexpected ally. The enemy, actually two telepaths from the planet Jirel, worked on this mission, and ends up with one of them, Mirenel Linke, dying after her Ghost Link was vaporized inside the Wave Motion Core chamber. As Cerestella, now the last of the Jirels, weeps, the crew of the Yamato reel from the strange encounter as they carry on their way.
15	"Point of No Return"; Transliteration: "Kikan Genkai-ten" (Japanese: 帰還限界点)	July 14, 2013 (Note: Episodes 15 to 18 were originally released together as Dai-goshō: Bōkyō no Gingakan Kukan (Chapter 5: "The Redolence of Intergalactic Space") in twelve Japanese theaters on April 13, 2013.)
General Domel devises a scheme to trap the Yamato in the midst of a massive fleet of Garmilas warships, unaware of what is taking place behind the scenes on his homeworld, which came to bite him just as he was about to sink the Terron battleship.
16	"A Choice for the Future"; Transliteration: "Mirai e no Sentaku" (Japanese: 未来への選択)	July 21, 2013
Badly damaged and in need of provisions, and with Captain Okita resting because he collapsed again "due to overwork" (as Dr. Sado said), the Yamato lands on a lush, fertile planet named Beemela-4. As a ground team led by Susumu makes a startling discovery which could help them a lot in their journey to Iscandar, there are doubts if the ship still has a chance to complete its journey in time. XO Sanada confronted Kaoru about her real motives. There, Kaoru tried convincing Sanada that they abandon their quest for Iscandar and stay on Beemela. That accounted to treason, and he asked the security personnel to arrest her. But, instead, the security force led by Shinya Itou--actually members of a pro-Izumo Plan faction (supporters of a plan that was supposed to be the Yamato 's original mission)--seizes the chance to attempt a mutiny. The mutiny was quelled when Toru Hoshina, one of the members of the security force secretly working under Director Todo's orders, asked Daisuke Shima for help before the mutiny attempt happened, and with some help from Akira and even Dr. Sado, and also with the timely return of Captain Okita; and Kaoru, a member of the pro-Izumo faction, along with Shinya and the other mutineers, were sent to the brig.
17	"Out of the Forest of Memory"; Transliteration: "Kioku no Mori kara" (Japanese: 記憶の森から)	July 28, 2013
Just as General Domel was tried and found guilty because of accusations that he is partly responsible for Desler's assassination, Susumu, Yuki and Shiro explore, with the help of an alien device, the control center of an abandoned warp gateway created by an ancient civilization under Garmilas control. In the midst of a deadly undertaking, Shiro unveils a surprise about the Yamato 's navigational functions and his close friendship with Susumu's late brother Mamoru (as well as Mamoru's relationship with Kaoru). That surprise--that of the comatose Yurisha Iscandar being kept in a capsule in the Automatic Navigation Control Room as its core--is later revealed by Captain Okita to the rest of the crew (apparently breaking a gag order as a result), so as well to quell rumors that Yuki is actually an alien. They also find out that Yuria Misaki has been possessed by Yurisha.
18	"Over the Black Light"; Transliteration: "Kuraki Hikari o Koete" (Japanese: 昏き光を越えて)	August 4, 2013
Using the newly reactivated warp gateway, fighter pilot Hiroki Shinohara scouts the intended shortcut to the halfway point at planet Balun using a captured Garmilas fighter. Once there he discovers a vast fleet of over 10,000 Garmilas ships. That fleet is actually assembled for an astro-naval review, which General Herm Zoellick called for. He took the chance to announce that Desler has been assassinated and tried to seize leadership of Garmilas. Meanwhile, the Yamato is ready to take an alternate route as a result of Hiroki's discovery, but Captain Okita declares that the Yamato must fight its way through the enemy's massive armada if they want to reach the Large Magellanic Cloud in time. Upon the Yamato's entrance through the gate, General Zoellick orders all ships to open fire at the Terron ship, but many are lost due to their being closely spaced. The ships manage to force the Yamato to crash land at Balun. Just when Zoellick was about to declare victory, Desler appears on his ship's monitor, revealing his assassin. An enraged General Goer shot Zoellick to death just as he, the assassin Desler is referring to, tries to explain himself to everyone present. Just then, they see the Yamato fly again, this time readying the Wave Motion Gun. General Goer scoffs at the Yamato upon seeing the trajectory of the Wave Motion Gun's fire, until he realizes that the Gun aimed for Balun's artificial core. When an emergency has been raised, he ordered all ships to get out of the Balun area out of horror. The Yamato, pushed by the Wave Motion Gun's fire, was propelled towards the Magellanic Gate by disabling the ship's anti-gravity anchors. As Balun explodes, the Yamato is now at the edge of the Large Magellanic Cloud.
19	"They're Coming"; Transliteration: "Karera wa Kita" (Japanese: 彼らは来た)	August 11, 2013 (Note: Episodes 19 to 22 were originally released together as Dai-rokushō: Tōtatsu! Dai Magellan (Chapter 6: "Arrival! Large Magellanic Cloud") in sixteen Japanese theaters on June 15, 2013.)
General Domel, his name now cleared, engages in a battle of wits with Captain Okita as he prepares a special attack force to stop the Earth vessel once and for all. But because the main fleets are now light years away due to the destruction of the hyperspace gate at Balun, he has to make do with a crew composed of inexperienced young soldiers, veteran carrier pilots, and a bunch of second-class Garmilans from the planet Zaltz (the same planet as that of Pluto Base's ex-commander Shultz). As the Yamato penetrates the Large Magellanic Cloud, Yurisha, while possessing Yuria, discovers that the ship has a weapon using Wave Motion Energy, and confronts Captain Okita, telling him that Wave Motion Energy should not be used as a weapon. Captain Okita then asked her to believe in them when he said the Wave Motion Gun is only for self-defense, as Yurisha's role is only to observe. He then asked her to watch them carefully and see if humanity is worth saving.
20	"Under a Rainbow Sun"; Transliteration: "Nanairo no Uō no Moto ni" (Japanese: 七色の陽のもとに)	August 18, 2013
General Domel's task force engages the Yamato in a nebula dubbed by Daisuke (for convenience) as the Rainbow Star Cluster. During a fierce battle in which the Yamato is heavily damaged and its Wave Motion Gun disabled with a converted asteroid mining drill, which was reversed by Kaoru and Analyzer, it is infiltrated by Garmilan operatives tasked to kidnap Yurisha of Iscandar. Unfortunately, the operatives see Yuki instead, and, mistaking her for their target, took her. As Susumu is shocked to see Yuki being taken away, the real Yurisha awakens from her coma.
21	"Prison Planet 17"; Transliteration: "Daijūhachi Shūyōjo Wakusei" (Japanese: 第十七収容所惑星)	August 25, 2013
The heavily-damaged Yamato did a burial at sea for the ones who perished in the recent battle. Meanwhile, Yuki, mistaken for Yurisha, is taken to a Garmilas prison colony called Leptapoda, where she is attended by General Domel's wife, who is incarcerated on the prison planet. The Yamato is not far behind, its crew unknowingly seeking to resupply and repair. On a recon patrol involving Susumu and Yurisha, Sukeharu Yabu and Shinya Ito, two of the mutineers, apparently surviving the last battle with Domel, were onboard the Seagull that Susumu pilots, and tried to wrest control of the craft until Yurisha disengaged her seatbelt, affording Susumu a diversion to knock the two down. Sukeharu accidentally fired at the controls as a result, causing it to crash, and is captured by alerted Garmiloids. Just as the prison warden welcomed Yuki, reports of the capture of some runaway prisoners came about. The warden saw Yurisha among them, prompting him to rush to the outside to meet them. Just as that happens, somebody frees the prisoners and distributes weapons. A rioter threw a grenade towards Susumu and the others, dispersing them when they dodged its blast. Meanwhile, the Inspector arrived to visit the prison, but they pointed guns at the warden. It was Melda, coming to free her father, Admiral Gul Ditz, who is imprisoned there. On the other hand, Shinya fired at a soldier who was about to shoot Yurisha, and got rid of her handcuffs. Yurisha rid him of his cuffs before getting himself killed when somebody shot him. His dying wish was for "Yuki" to take the Yamato to Iscandar and save Earth. Susumu sees Yuki, but she is taken by her escort, a Zaltzi named Norran Ortschett, to Captain Wolf Flakken's waiting submarine. As Admiral Ditz and his companions take control of the prison planet, Yurisha tells an anguished Susumu where Yuki is taken to, which leads him to a shocking discovery: Garmilas, where Yuki is taken, is Iscandar's twin planet. Around this time, Kaoru has been pardoned of her mutiny charges.
22	"The Planet that We Head For"; Transliteration: "Mukaubeki Hoshi" (Japanese: 向かうべき星)	September 1, 2013
Captain Okita's condition takes a turn for the worse as the rest of the crew learn that Iscandar and Garmilas are twin planets situated at the same star system. Admiral Ditz's forces and the Yamato plan to help each other, but certain differences led them to peacefully part ways, although leaving them with important information about Desler, and Melda staying with the Yamato as a liaison. Meanwhile, despite knowing that Yuki is not Yurisha, Desler takes advantage of their resemblance to rally his fellow Garmilans in an attempt to take over Iscandar. This reaches Queen Starsha in Iscandar. As the Yamato is about to reach their destination, the ship is targeted by an unknown enemy weapon.
23	"One Man's War"; Transliteration: "Tatta Hitori no Sensō" (Japanese: たった一人の戦争)	September 8, 2013 (Note: Episodes 23 to 26 were originally released together as Dai-nanashō: Soshite Kan wa Iku (Chapter 7: "And Now the Warship Comes") in sixteen Japanese theaters on August 24, 2013.)
After being almost destroyed by the Desler Cannon (Desler's own Wave Motion Gun), Captain Okita orders the Yamato to launch an offensive at the Garmilas capital Baleras. Via holographic transmission, Queen Starsha of Iscandar pleaded with Desler not to proceed with using his Desler Cannon, but ignored her pleas, even justifying his actions by revealing that the ship she is bringing to Iscandar uses Wave Motion Energy as a weapon, too. As the Yamato attacks Desler's palace head-on, Desler escapes to his space fortress, the "Second Baleras," in a ship hidden within the palace, with Yuki on board. He then drops a part of the fortress on the capital in an attempt to vanquish the Yamato while sacrificing his own people, as "a rite of passage" and "signalling the rebirth of a new Garmilas;" and aiming to use Second Baleras, the new capital, to unify it with Iscandar. This display of behavior by Desler angered an otherwise submissive General Hyss, Desler's right-hand man, who orders a state of emergency throughout Baleras. While the rest of the Yamato crew engage the falling portion of the fortress, Yuki did her best aboard Desler's ship by sabotaging the Wave Motion Core of his Desler Cannon by forcing it into overload. Susumu, on the other hand (with Yurisha) departs to rescue Yuki by himself--something he can only do.
24	"The Distant Promised Land"; Transliteration: "Harukanaru Yakusoku no Ji" (Japanese: 遥かなる約束の地)	September 15, 2013
With Desler apparently dead and the Garmilans ceasing their hostilities, the Yamato at last reaches Iscandar, but Queen Starsha is in doubt about providing the assist she promised upon seeing that the Earthlings used the technology she entrusted to them as a weapon of mass destruction. Her doubt causes unease among the crew. As the crew relax to dissipate the tensions by swimming in Iscandar's seas, Starsha hears from all sides, including a grateful General Hyss and even Yurisha herself. She then comes to the Yamato with a decision. As she brings what the crew of the Yamato came for, Starsha revealed that they were the first to use the technology used in what the Yamato crew calls the Wave Motion Gun, to bloodily forge a mighty Iscandarian empire across the Large Magellanic Cloud. Because of the weapon's sheer terror, they never gave the technology to anyone. Starsha then reveals to Susumu the ultimate fate of his brother, which was eventually made known to the rest of the crew. The Yamato then prepares itself for the long journey back to Earth with the Cosmo Reverser--the Yamato itself, rebuilt, with Melda staying behind to help Yurisha with the people of Garmilas; and Starsha clinging to Captain Okita's promise never to repeat their folly with the Wave Motion Gun.
25	"The Forever War"; Transliteration: "Owari Naki Tatakai" (Japanese: 終わりなき戦い)	September 22, 2013
Now becoming the device that can restore Earth's environment, the hope-carrying Yamato (with the Wave Motion Gun port sealed) is on its way back to Earth. They encounter a powerless vessel containing Cerestella, the last of the Jirels and is a part of Desler's cabinet. Along with General Goer and his fleet, which was dispatched by Captain Flakken and his crew (now including the ex-Yamato engine room operator Sukeji Yabu) using the dimensional submarine, Desler, who was presumed dead, comes at the Yamato for a final confrontation at the hyperspace gate. He infiltrated the Yamato with a horde of robotic Garmiloids. Cerestella rushed to Desler, emitting sympathetic telepathic waves, causing Desler to shoot her by accident. In disbelief, Cerestella tries killing herself. Yuki tries to prevent it, but was shot by Desler's guards. As the Garmiloids were disabled, Desler sounds the retreat back to his ship. Desler tries shooting the Yamato with his Desler Cannon, but due to forces within the hyperspace gate, it causes his ship to explode.
26	"Memories of the Blue Planet"; Transliteration: "Aoi Hoshi no Kioku" (Japanese: 青い星の記憶)	September 29, 2013
The Yamato is on the last legs of their journey through outer space. However, a heartbroken Susumu has little to celebrate, even during Saburo and Makoto's wedding, as Yuki did not survive from the wounds she suffered in the last battle. While witnessing the suffering of his brother, Mamoru's spirit, which Kaoru saw earlier, appears next to him to create a miracle, as the Yamato arrives on Earth just in time with a fully-working Cosmo Reverser.
