= Baku Tech! Bakugan (TV series) =

- Country of origin: Japan
- No. of episodes: 90

Original release
- Network: TV Tokyo
- Release: April 7, 2012 – December 28, 2013

Baku Tech! Bakugan is a series in the Bakugan franchise separate from the Bakugan Battle Brawlers series featuring a new cast of characters and a new plot. It adapts the manga of the same name by SHINGO, serialized in Shogakukan's CoroCoro Comic since 2010. Each episode is five and a half minutes long, and aired within the show Ohayō Colosseum UP (Ohacoro Up) on Saturdays at 8:45 am on TV Tokyo. The first season premiered in April 2012, followed by Baku Tech! Bakugan Gachi, which premiered on April 6, 2013 and aired within the show Ohayō Colosseum POP (Ohacoro Pop) on Saturdays at 9:00 am on TV Tokyo.

== Baku Tech! Bakugan (season 1): 2012-13 ==
No.	Title	Original release date
1	"Critical KO!"; Transliteration: "Kuritikaru KO!" (Japanese: クリティカルK.O!)	April 7, 2012
The first Brawl of Harubaru against Raichi in the Bakugan Dojo.
2	"My Companion, Dragaon"; Transliteration: "Aibou wa Doragaon" (Japanese: 相棒はドラガオン!)	April 14, 2012
Harubaru relates to Tatsuma on how he acquired Flare Dragaon.
3	"Shoot to Extremes"; Transliteration: "Shūto wo Kiwamero" (Japanese: シュートをきわめろ!)	April 21, 2012
Raichi and Harubaru teaches Tatsuma about the different BakuTech play styles.
4	"The Grif Brothers"; Transliteration: "Gurifu Kyoudai" (Japanese: グリフ兄弟!)	April 28, 2012
5	"Shadow Sanjushi"; Transliteration: "Shadō Sanjūshi!" (Japanese: シャドウ三獣士!)	May 5, 2012
6	"Quilt's Temple"; Transliteration: "Kiruto no Shinden!" (Japanese: キルトの神殿!)	May 12, 2012
7	"Zero Munikis!"; Transliteration: "Zero Munikisu!" (Japanese: 零ムニキス!)	May 19, 2012
8	"Dragaon's Evolution"; Transliteration: "Doragaon Shinka!" (Japanese: ドラガオン進化!)	May 26, 2012
9	"The Mysterious Master Jyou!"; Transliteration: "Nazo no Masutā Jō!" (Japanese: 謎のマスター・ジョウ!)	June 2, 2012
10	"Ninja Art Poisonous Insult!""; Transliteration: "Ninpō Doku Bari no Jutsu!" (Japanese: 忍法毒バリの術!)	June 9, 2012
11	"Soft Words Win Hard Hearts!"; Transliteration: "Jūyokugō wo Seisu!" (Japanese: 柔よく剛を制す!)	June 16, 2012
12	"Self-Evolving Bakugan"; Transliteration: "Jiko Shinka Bakugan!" (Japanese: 自己進化爆丸!)	June 23, 2012
13	"Phantasmal Munikis!"; Transliteration: "Genwaku no Munikisu!" (Japanese: 幻惑のムニキス!)	June 30, 2012
14	"Advent of a Legend!"; Transliteration: "Densetsu no Kōrin!" (Japanese: 伝説の降臨!)	July 7, 2012
15	"Sechs Tavanel!"; Transliteration: "Zekusu Tabaneru" (Japanese: 統タヴァネル)	July 14, 2012
16	"Zakuro Invades!"; Transliteration: "Zakuro Shūrai!" (Japanese: ザクロ襲来!)	July 21, 2012
17	"Bone Skuls!"; Transliteration: "Bōn Sukarusu!" (Japanese: 骸スカルス!)	July 28, 2012
18	"Dio Sivac's Curse!"; Transliteration: "Jio Shivaku no Noroi!" (Japanese: 帝シヴァクの呪い!)	August 4, 2012
19	"Power Battle"; Transliteration: "Pawa Batoru!" (Japanese: パワーバトル!)	August 11, 2012
20	"King Harou!"; Transliteration: "Kingu Haro!" (Japanese: キング・ハロ!)	August 18, 2012
21	"G-Ganorada"; Transliteration: "Ji Ganoreda!" (Japanese: 鳳ガノレーダ!)	August 25, 2012
22	"BakuThron DX"; Transliteration: "Bakusuron DX!" (Japanese: 爆スロン DX!)	September 1, 2012
23	"Leones vs Falco!"; Transliteration: "Faruko tai Reonesu!" (Japanese: ファルコ対レオネス!)	September 8, 2012
24	"Again the devil!" Transliteration: "Akuma wa Futatabi!" (Japanese: 悪魔はふたたび!)	September 15, 2012
25	"Cry, Shield Leoness!"; Transliteration: "Hoero! Sirudo Reonesu!" (Japanese: ほえろ!護レオネス!)	September 22, 2012
26	"Bakugan Dojo Break-up!"; Transliteration: "Bakugan Dōjō Bunretsu!" (Japanese: 爆丸道場分裂!)	September 29, 2012
27	"Super Almighty Bakugan!"; Transliteration: "Chō Ban'nō Bakugan!" (Japanese: 超万能爆丸!)	October 6, 2012
28	"The Invincible Grif Whirlwind!"; Transliteration: "Muteki no Gurifu Senpū!" (Japanese: 無敵のグリフ旋風!)	October 13, 2012
29	"Initiate Counterattack!"; Transliteration: "Hangeki Kaishi!" (Japanese: 反撃開始!)	October 20, 2012
30	"The Metal Parts of Friendship!"; Transliteration: "Yūjō no Metaru Pātsu!" (Japanese: 友情のメタルパーツ!)	October 27, 2012
31	"Hugger Doguma!"; Transliteration: "Hagā Doguma!" (Japanese: 陣ドグマ!)	October 27, 2012
32	"Win Dmill!"; Transliteration: "Win Domiru!" (Japanese: 扇ドミル!)	November 10, 2012
33	"Wind Metal Sole!"; Transliteration: "Windo Metaru Soru!" (Japanese: 統風メタルソール!)	November 17, 2012
34	"The Two-Faced Bakugan!"; Transliteration: "Futatsu no Kao no Bakugan!" (Japanese: 二つの顔の爆丸!)	November 24, 2012
35	"Odos versus Doubrew!"; Transliteration: "Odosu tai Daburyu!" (Japanese: オドス対ダブリュ！)	December 1, 2012
36	"His Name is Mister Up!"; Transliteration: "Sono Na wa Misuta Appu!" (Japanese: その名はミスター・アップ！)	December 8, 2012
37	"Kachia Gell's Impact!"; Transliteration: "Kachia Geru no Shougeki!" (Japanese: 突（カチア）ゲルの衝撃！)	December 15, 2012
38	"Gell Upper!"; Transliteration: "Geru Appa!" (Japanese: ゲルアッパー!)	December 22, 2012
39	"His Name is Mister Down!"; Transliteration: "Sono Na wa Misuta Daun!" (Japanese: その名はミスター・ダウン！)	December 30, 2012
40	"The Blue Gale, Butta Gill!"; Transliteration: "Aoi Reppu, Butta Giru!" (Japanese: 青い烈風、斬（ブッタ）ギル！)	January 12, 2013
41	"Bakugan Clash!"; Transliteration: "Gachi Baku Towa!" (Japanese: ガチ爆とは！)	January 19, 2013
42	"Bakugan Clash Start!"; Transliteration: "Gachi Baku Sutāto!" (Japanese: ガチ爆スタート!)	January 26, 2013
43	"Seis Tavanel vs. Zakuro!"; Transliteration: "Shisu Tabaneru tai Zakuro!" (Japanese: 覇(シス)タヴァネル対ザクロ!)	February 2, 2013
44	"Bakugan Clash in the Wilderness"; Transliteration: "Kōya no Gachi Baku!" (Japanese: 荒野のガチ爆!)	February 9, 2013
45	"The Seis Metal Threat!"; Transliteration: "Kyōi no Shisu Metaru!" (Japanese: 脅威の覇メタル!)	February 16, 2013
46	"Six Metal"; Transliteration: "Roku Metaru!" (Japanese: 6（ろく）メタル)	February 23, 2013
47	"A Special Training on Bakugan Clash"; Transliteration: "Gachi Baku Tokkun!" (Japanese: ガチ爆特訓！)	March 2, 2013
48	"Seis Tavanel's Assault"; Transliteration: "Shisu Tabaneru Shuugeki!!" (Japanese: シス）タヴァネル襲撃！)	March 9, 2013
49	"Metal Hunting"; Transliteration: "Metaru Kari!" (Japanese: メタル狩り！)	March 16, 2013
50	"Protect the Future!"; Transliteration: "Mirai o Mamore!" (Japanese: 未来を守れ!)	March 23, 2013
51	"Go! Rise Dragaon!"; Transliteration: "Ike! Raizu Doragaon!" (Japanese: いけ! 天(ライズ)ドラガオン!)	March 30, 2013

== Baku Tech! Bakugan Gachi (season 2): 2013 ==
No.	Title	Original release date
1	"The Curtain Rises for the Tavanel Cup!"; Transliteration: "Tavaneru Kappu Kaimaku!" (Japanese: タヴァネルカップ開幕!)	April 6, 2013
2	"Go Garyu!"; Transliteration: "Go Garyu!" (Japanese: 轟ガリュウ！)	April 13, 2013
3	"The Magic Bullet, Gaga Horus"; Transliteration: "Madan no Gaga Horusu!" (Japanese: 魔弾の瞬（ガガ）ホルス！)	April 20, 2013
4	"Bind!"; Transliteration: "Baindo!" (Japanese: 化合(バインド)!)	April 27, 2013
5	"Go Horus!"; Transliteration: "Gō Horusu!" (Japanese: 轟ホルス!)	May 4, 2013
6	"Semifinals! Raichi versus Nivil!"; Transliteration: "Junkesshou! Raichi Tai Nibiru!" (Japanese: 準決勝！ライチ対ニビル!)	May 11, 2013
7	"Gaga Garyu!"; Transliteration: "Gaga Garyu!" (Japanese: 瞬（ガガ）ガリュウ！)	May 18, 2013
8	"Hollow Munikis on Gallows!"; Transliteration: "Shōkei no Horo Munikis!" (Japanese: 処刑台の幻(ホロ)ムニキス)	May 25, 2013
9	"Reunion! Brother Haro!"; Transliteration: "Saikai! Haro nii!" (Japanese: 再会! ハロ兄!)	June 1, 2013
10	"Biyon! Barri Beyond!"; Transliteration: "Piyon! Bari Biyondo!" (Japanese: ピヨ～ン! 羅(バリ)ビヨンド!)	June 8, 2013
11	"Data-Transcending Battle!"; Transliteration: "Dēta o koeta Batoru!" (Japanese: データを超えたバトル!)	June 15, 2013
12	"Rise Dragaon's Last Moment!"; Transliteration: "Raizu Doragaon no Saigo!" (Japanese: 天（ライズ）ドラガオンの最期！)	June 22, 2013
13	"Different Dimension Evolution! Dragaon!"; Transliteration: "Ijigen Shinka! Doragaon!" (Japanese: 異次元進化! ドラガオン!)	June 29, 2013
14	"First Battle! Jigen Dragaon!"; Transliteration: "Uijin! Jigen Doragaon!" (Japanese: 初陣! 士(じげん)ドラガオン!)	July 6, 2013
15	"The Storm-Summoning Final!"; Transliteration: "Arashi o yobu Kesshōsen!" (Japanese: 嵐を呼ぶ決勝戦！)	July 13, 2013
16	"Dragaon! Second Dimension!"; Transliteration: "Doragaon! Ni no Jigen!" (Japanese: ドラガオン！二次元！（にのじげん）)	July 20, 2013
17	"Showdown! Seis Tavanel!"; Transliteration: "Kecchaku! Shisu Tavaneru!" (Japanese: 決着！覇（シス）タヴァネル！)	July 27, 2013
18	"Confrontation! Battlefield Kiwami!"; Transliteration: "Taiketsu! Batorufīrudo Kiwami!" (Japanese: 対決！バトルフィールド極！)	August 3, 2013
19	"Ghost Story! Gachi-BakuBaku Abyss!"; Transliteration: "Kaiden! Gachi Baku Baku Fuchi!" (Japanese: 怪談！ガチ爆々淵！)	August 10, 2013
20	"Shock! Jiba Fudo!"; Transliteration: "Biribiri! Jiba Fudō!" (Japanese: ビリビリ！磁（ジバ）フドウ！)	August 17, 2013
21	"Formidable Enemy! Elec!"; Transliteration: "Kiyōteki! Erekku!" (Japanese: 強敵！エレック！)	August 24, 2013
22	"BakuTech! Double Magnet!"; Transliteration: "BakuTECH! Daboru Magunetto!" (Japanese: 爆TECH！ダブルマグネット！)	August 31, 2013
23	"Deka Bakugan, DraThron!"; Transliteration: "Deka Bakugan Dorasuron!" (Japanese: 超（デカ）爆丸ドラスロン！)	September 7, 2013
24	"Transformation! Deka Dragon Mode!"; Transliteration: "Henkei! Deka Doragon Mōdo" (Japanese: 変形！超（デカ）ドラゴンモード！)	September 14, 2013
25	"Revenge! The Lightning Demon!"; Transliteration: "Ribenji! Dengeki no Majin!" (Japanese: リベンジ！電撃の魔人！)	September 21, 2013
26	"The Ultimate Transformation! Fourth Dimension"; Transliteration: "Kyūkyoku henkei! Yon no Jigen" (Japanese: 究極変形！四次元！（よんのじげん）)	September 28, 2013
27	"The Masked Challenger!"; Transliteration: "Kamen no Chōsensha!" (Japanese: 仮面の挑戦者！)	October 5, 2013
28	"Eight Metal! Sanzu Hollowbos"; Transliteration: "Eito Metaru! Sanzu Horobos!" (Japanese: 8メタル！滅（サンズ）ホロヴォス！)	October 12, 2013
29	"Fierce Battle! Raichi vs. Zakuro!"; Transliteration: "Gekitō! Raichi tai Zakuro!" (Japanese: 激闘！ライチ対ザクロ！)	October 19, 2013
30	"Runaway! Tatsuma DraThron!"; Transliteration: "Bōsō! Tatsuma Dorasuron!" (Japanese: 暴走！タツマドラスロン！)	October 26, 2013
31	"The New Leoness and Falco are Born!"; Transliteration: "Shingata Reonesu Faruko Tanjō!" (Japanese: 新型レオネス・ファルコ誕生！)	November 2, 2013
32	"Secret of the Bakugan Brothers!"; Transliteration: "Kyōdai Bakugan no Himitsu!!" (Japanese: 兄弟爆丸の秘密！)	November 9, 2013
33	"Herculean Strength! Lashow Leoness!"; Transliteration: "Gōriki! Rashō Reonesu!" (Japanese: 剛力！将（ラショウ）レオネス！)	November 16, 2013
34	"Super Strength! Ogre Falco!"; Transliteration: "Chōriki! Ouga Faruko!" (Japanese: 超力！皇（オウガ）ファルコ！)	November 23, 2013
35	"Make a Big Comeback! Go Dragaon!"; Transliteration: "Dai Gyakuten! Gō Doragaon!" (Japanese: 大逆転！轟（ゴウ）ドラガオン！)	November 30, 2013
36	"Raichi's Revival! Zeta Munikis Appears!"; Transliteration: "Fukkatsu no Raichi! Zēta Munikisu Tōjō!" (Japanese: 復活のライチ！ゼータムニキス登場！)	December 7, 2013
37	"Push Push! The Masculine Press!"; Transliteration: "Pusshu Pusshu! Osu Puresu!" (Japanese: プッシュプッシュ！押（オス）プレス！！)	December 14, 2013
38	"Clash! Harubaru vs. Raichi!"; Transliteration: "Gekitotsu! Harubaru tai Raichi!" (Japanese: 激突！春晴対ライチ！)	December 21, 2013
39	"Go! Jigen Dragaon!"; Transliteration: "Ike! Jigen Doragaon!" (Japanese: いけ！士（ジゲン）ドラガオン！)	December 28, 2013
