= List of Poyopoyo Kansatsu Nikki episodes =

Poyopoyo Kansatsu Nikki is an anime based on the manga series of the same title by Rū Tatsuki. It is a slice-of-life comedy centered on a spherical cat named Poyo, a girl named Moe who adopts him, and her strange family. The anime television series began airing on January 8, 2012, and has been simulcasting on Crunchyroll subtitled in English. The anime aired on TV Tokyo and Kids Station in Japan.

== Episodes ==
No.	Title
1	"All About Maru the Cat..."; Transliteration: "Sono Neko Maru ni Tsuki..." (Japanese: その猫マルにつき…)
Moe meets Poyo after passing out in the street.
2	"Forever with the Sphere"; Transliteration: "Maru to Itsumo Demo~tsu" (Japanese: マルといつまでもっ)
Moe continues her narration of the Sato family and Poyo's mysterious nature.
3	"The Sphere and Kuro"; Transliteration: "Maru to Kuno" (Japanese: マルとクロ)
Poyo has a new cat friend, Kurobe, and shows Hide why he is so dashing.
4	"The Sphere's Three Neighbors"; Transliteration: "Mukō 3-ken Maru to Nari" (Japanese: 向こう3軒マルとなり)
Poyo earns the respect of the owners' Farmers Market, and meets Hide's classmates Maki and Suzuki.
5	"Come in, Sphere"; Transliteration: "Maru wa Uchi" (Japanese: マルはウチ)
It is the start of the New Year, and traditional beans thrown for Setsubun affects the pets of Moe, Maki, and Suzuki differently.
6	"When With a Sphere, Do as the Sphere Does"; Transliteration: "Maru ni Haitte wa Maru ni Nare" (Japanese: マルに入ってはマルになれ)
Poyo is acting as a surrogate mother for the orphaned kittens, while the Sato family searches for adopters, but spending time with Poyo, each kitten is developing a unique trait.
7	"Snow Falling on Spheres"; Transliteration: "Yuki no Furu Maru wa♪" (Japanese: 雪の降るマルは♪)
Kurobe, the cat next door, is missing. The old lady next door has enlisted the Sato family and friends to help find him.
8	"Come, Sphere"; Transliteration: "Maru yo Koi" (Japanese: マルよ来い)
Moe works out during the winter season, Poyo gives up his secret base, and a girl will wear anything in the cold to look cute.
9	"The Sphere Has Been Waiting for You"; Transliteration: "Matteta Maru" (Japanese: 待ってたマル)
Granny has won an overnight trip to a hot spring, but is reluctant to leave Kuro alone. Hide agrees to watch Kuro and Poyo, so Moe and Granny can enjoy the trip.
10	"The Sphere Stood Up"; Transliteration: "Maru ga Tatte" (Japanese: マルがたった)
Moe explains the various tricks and behavior of Poyo. The other pet owners share the tricks of Kuro, Tsuku, and Daifuku.
11	"The Sphere is Nice and Warm"; Transliteration: "Maru wa Hokka Hoka" (Japanese: マルはほっかほか)
When spring arrives, the routines change around the household.
12	"The Season of the Sphere"; Transliteration: "Maru no Kisetsu" (Japanese: マルの季節)
It is strawberry season, and an old friend of Poyo's is back. Hide, Moe, and Maki are enlisted to work at Akai's Strawberry Field.
13	"The Sphere of Blessings"; Transliteration: "Megumi no Maru" (Japanese: 恵みのマル)
It is spring and is time to show a little skin, be lazy, and suffer from allergies.
14	"The Hated Sphere"; Transliteration: "Kiraware no Maru" (Japanese: きらわれのマル)
The Satos have new neighbors, the Tanakas. The wife, Yuka, is afraid of animals.
15	"Sphere Snapshots"; Transliteration: "Maru Pashari" (Japanese: マルぱしゃり)
Moe is determined to get Poyo into cat magazines. Everyone offers their own version of what it will take to make it happen.
16	"The Sphere Fights"; Transliteration: "Maru wa Tatakau" (Japanese: マルはたたかう)
The legacy of Poyo continues around the neighborhood.
17	"The Sphere Weather"; Transliteration: "Maru Biyōri" (Japanese: マル日和)
Moe attempts to create a Poyo steamed cake, Grandma learns to appreciate her Kuro, and Poyo might be a superhero.
18	"A Real Ladies' Sphere"; Transliteration: "Mote Maru" (Japanese: モテマル)
A new cat is in the neighborhood causing unexpected trouble for Poyo.
19	"Sphere Baldness"; Transliteration: "Maru Hage" (Japanese: マルハゲ)
A new house is being built in the area the cats like to play; Poyo gets himself in a sticky situation.
20	"Mysterious Sphere"; Transliteration: "Nazona Maru" (Japanese: なぞなマル)
A sudden phone call causes Moe to run out of the house, leaving Papa worried. Yuka-san provides great story material for Hide.
21	"The Sphere's Habits"; Transliteration: "Maru Kuse" (Japanese: マルくせ)
A favorite phrases and habits of cat owners are revealed in this episode.
22	"Sphere Magistrate"; Transliteration: "Maru Bugyō" (Japanese: マル奉行)
Poyo is the unofficial ruler of the neighborhood, but one of his subjects becomes a temporary housemate.
23	"Drizzle, Drizzle, Sphere, Sphere"; Transliteration: "Shito Shito Maru Maru" (Japanese: しとしとマルマル)
Everybody spends their time differently on a rainy day, animals and humans alike.
24	"Rain and Toads on Spheres"; Transliteration: "Tsuyu Ga Maru" (Japanese: ツユガマル)
During the rainy season, cabin fever sets in and guardian spirits come out.
25	"Let's Do Some Sphere-ious Tidying"; Transliteration: "Maru Sharimashō" (Japanese: マルしゃりましょう)
The Sato household is on a cleaning spree.
26	"Spherely-Poly"; Transliteration: "Marukoro" (Japanese: マルコロ)
Food can be a power weapon or super cute, as everything is better when it looks like Poyo.
27	"The Bamboo Leaves Rustle in the Spheres"; Transliteration: "Sasa no wa Māru Maru" (Japanese: ささのはマールマル)
Cats and humans alike enjoy Tanabata.
28	"The Summer-Colored Sphere"; Transliteration: "Natsuiro no Maru" (Japanese: 夏色のマル)
Summer has come, and everyone handles it a different way.
29	"Summer All A-Round"; Transliteration: "Maru Goto Natsu" (Japanese: マルごとナツ)
The summer season continues, and this episode has a focus on Kurobe and Hide.
30	"Aloha Sphere"; Transliteration: "Aroha Maru" (Japanese: アロハマル)
The heat is bad, and everyone is dealing with it in their own special way.
31	"The Roundest Day of Summer"; Transliteration: "Natsu no Ichiban Maru I-Bi" (Japanese: 夏の一番マルい日)
Cucumbers, watermelons, and snakes all make for great summer snacks.
32	"Round Summer Mystery"; Transliteration: "Maru Samā Misuterī" (Japanese: マルサマーミステリー)
A monk has come to perform a Buddhist memorial service and runs into Poyo.
33	"The Lantern Festival Should be Round"; Transliteration: "Obon wa Maru Ku" (Japanese: お盆はマルく)
Chikua~ Chikuba~ Poyo~ Poyo~ Hya~
34	"Rumble, Flash, Spheres Pouring Down"; Transliteration: "Goropika Marusshān" (Japanese: ゴロピカマルッシャーン)
The weather turns the conversation into a game of "What If?"
35	"Next to the Sphere was Another Sphere"; Transliteration: "Maru no Tonari ni Maru Ga Ita" (Japanese: マルのとなりにマルがいた)
It is the season for chrysanthemum.
36	"The Sphere Circled 'Round, or Whatever"; Transliteration: "Maru ga Marushite Maru to Yara" (Japanese: マルがマルしてマルとやら)
Moe has an obvious addiction to all that is round.
37	"Fur Everywhere, Spheres Everywhere"; Transliteration: "Kekkō Ke-darake Maru Maru-darake" (Japanese: けっこう毛だらけマル丸だらけ)
It is all about pet hair and beauty salons.
38	"Because the World is So Round"; Transliteration: "Chikyū ga Tottemo Maru i kara" (Japanese: 地球がとってもマルいから)
In this episode Poyo goes in space.
39	"It Was a Sphere Like a Lantern"; Transliteration: "Bon no Yōna Marudatta" (Japanese: 盆のようなマルだった)
Living with Poyo pays off at the sports fest, and Papa Sato does not fool around with thieves.
40	"As Autumn Deepens, What Does the Sphere Do?"; Transliteration: "Aki Fukashi Maru wa Nani o Suru Maru zo" (Japanese: 秋ふかしマルはなにをするマルぞ)
The colder air makes everyone a bit rounder.
41	"A Fighting Sphere Shot!"; Transliteration: "Faitona Maru Ippatsu~tsu" (Japanese: ファイトなマル一発っ!)
The members of the Sato family have to prove about how much they are strong in fight.
42	"I Found a Tiny Sphere"; Transliteration: "Chīsai Maru Mitsuketa" (Japanese: 小さいマル見つけた)
This episode has a focus on Daifuku.
43	"Read, See, Sphere"; Transliteration: "Yomu Miru Maru" (Japanese: 読む見るマル。)
Poyo wants to be a model.
44	"Round, Round, Grumble and Frown"; Transliteration: "Maru Maru Moya Moya" (Japanese: マルマルもやもや)
A cat never forgives, and never forgets.
45	"It Was a Sphere Tastier than a Chestnut"; Transliteration: "Kuri Yori Umai Marudatta" (Japanese: クリよりうまいマルだった)
Meat, potatoes, and a little weight gain.
46	"The Sphere of Warring States, Round 1"; Transliteration: "Sengoku Maru no Sono Zen Maru" (Japanese: 戦国マルのその前マル)
Moe has been transported back to the Warring States era.
47	"The Sphere of Warring States, Round 2"; Transliteration: "Sengoku Maru no Sonogo Maru" (Japanese: 戦国マルのその後マル)
Moe has been transported back to the Warring States era, and she is getting married.
48	"With Love and Spheres"; Transliteration: "Ai to Maru to" (Japanese: 愛とマルと)
Poyo wants to stay warm in the winter.
49	"Sneeze Three Times, Take Three Spheres"; Transliteration: "Kushami 3-kai Maru 3-jō" (Japanese: くしゃみ3回マル3錠)
Hide is sick, and Poyo is there to help.
50	"Where There are Spheres in Life, Life is All Spheres"; Transliteration: "Jinsei Maru Arya Zenbu Maru" (Japanese: 人生マルありゃ全部マル)
This episode is a clip show.
51	"Round the End of the Year"; Transliteration: "Oshitsu Marumashita" (Japanese: おしつマルました)
Moe and Poyo celebrate the end of the year.
52	"Until we Come 'Round Again"; Transliteration: "Mata Maru-bi Made" (Japanese: またマル日まで)
So long, round cat.
