= Limon and Oli =

- Genre: Comedy; Adventure; Family; Animation
- Created by: Salih Memecan
- Written by: Salih Memecan, Erge Özcan, Bruce Bernstein, Meriç Acemi, Jeff Treves, Alp Türkbiner, Baran Güler
- Directed by: Yücel Çavdar, İsmail Günbay, Diren Ayhan, Enes Büyük, Oğuz Öztürk
- Country of origin: Türkiye
- Original language: Turkish
- No. of seasons: 2
- No. of episodes: 54

Production
- Running time: 5 minutes (first season); 7 minutes (second season)
- Production company: Mart Ajans

Original release
- Network: TRT Children's Channel, Disney Channel Turkey, Disney Junior
- Release: 31 December 2012 – 2015

Limon and Oli is a Turkish animated cartoon series for children aged 4–9, created by Salih Memecan. The series has aired on Disney Junior since 2015 in 110 Europe, the Middle East and Africa countries. The show is based on the daily comic strip, Sizinkiler ("Your kind of family"), which has been published in a Turkish national newspaper since 1991.

== Premise ==
The television series revolves around the adventures of two anthropomorphic chicken chicks, Limon and Oli, in dealing with school, themselves, neighbors, or others.

== Airing history ==
The first season of Limon and Oli was aired as 26 five-minute episodes on Turkish TV, TRT Children's Channel, from 2012 to 2013. The next season aired on Disney Junior as 26 seven-minute episodes. The second season began in Turkey on Disney Junior, in November 2014, and had reached the airwaves of 110 countries by April 2015. Two additional seasons, totaling 52 seven-minute episodes, are slated to air on Disney Junior across those 110 CEEMA countries through 2017.

== Characters ==
Limon: A female yellow chick and the family's darling little girl. She is in grade school. She likes to think before she acts. Oli usually pulls Limon into an adventure before she can start planning how to go about it. However, she is always ready to join Oli's games. She is the center of attention in her family, especially paid by her mom. May wants to raise a “perfect” child and insists on feeding her healthy meals, enforcing her bed time, checking on her homework, and taking her to all kinds of extracurricular activities.

As a nice and intelligent girl, Limon usually plays along. She is not a stereotypical nerd, but she is curious to learn and is diligent when it comes to school work. She likes to be praised and to be liked. She resorts to her charm and sense of humor to get her way when she wants something at home or in school. She often challenges her parents with her thoughtful, “brilliant” questions.

Her catchphrases: "But why??", "But why not?"

Oli: A male black chick Limon's best friend and partner in crime. Oli is an adventurous, active, dynamic young boy. He is overly self-confident and highly energetic. He is always happy with what he gets. Nothing can put him down. Unlike Limon, Oli acts immediately and intuitively, and adapts to changes easily. Oli is friendly with everyone. Life is mostly fun and games for Oli. He never hesitates to dive into situations where he senses any possibility for fun and play. He is an expert skateboarder and juggler. He likes being outdoors and prefers to explore life in action over rigid, traditional classroom learning. School is not among his favorite activities. He likes to stay away from school as much as possible.

Oli's parents are rarely seen or mentioned and he is almost always seen at Limon's house, which can lead to the first time viewers to mistake Oli for Limon's brother.

His catchphrases: "Exactamente", "Am I a genius or what!", "Let me!", "Urgent! Urgent!"

Bubs: Limon's father and May's husband. Bubs loves his family but likes to take it easy and mind his own business. He is too cool for simple everyday chores and issues. He drives May crazy with his indifference to her expectations for romance, but knows how to make her laugh with his witty comments. He is more a realist than a romantic. He loves to read. He reads books, newspapers, magazines, clippings, and even prospectuses. He has an intellectual side and sense of humor that becomes handy in making May laugh.

Bubs' catchphrases: "Can you bring me...", "Of course I love you.", "Oh! I forgot!"

May: A typical multi-tasking, perfectionist, detail-oriented, loving mom. May's family means a lot to her. She is the boss around the house. She wants the best for everyone and goes out of her way to accommodate them. She is tough on her family to keep them on top of their chores and responsibilities. She yearns for romance but gets a few laughs instead. She has entrepreneurial aspirations and occasionally sees through some of her small business ideas, but she mostly likes to work on her own time and be her own boss. She always questions the meaning of love, life, relationship, and marriage. Anniversaries mean a lot to her. She usually hints at Bubs when their anniversary is around the corner, to avoid feeling catastrophic disappointment. However, she is usually the one who plans the celebration. She struggles with her weight and is always first to jump on the latest diet, exercise, and healthy living fad. She likes to take vacations with her family.

May's catchphrases: "Did you do this? That?", "What is the meaning of love, life, marriage, etc.?", "It's bed time!", "Finish your food!", "Do your homework!"

Great Great Grandpa: Lives in a small house far away from the city. He is a fun grandpa, and a great storyteller. And, having seen and done them all, he has a lot to tell. He is a life guru!

Gıcıko: A jealous, selfish, and mean character, she tries to ruin Limon and Oli's fun endeavours.

Akonpokon: A born-to-be scientist. He is busy experimenting with scientific projects, inventing things, reading about them. He has little time for petty kids stuff.

== Episodes ==
=== Season 1 ===
Limon and Oli turn themselves into" Team Crazy Eggs" when faced with a problem or create one just for the adventure of it. But, they have to deal with the incurable protagonist Proto. Limon and Oli find creative ways to outdo Proto to achieve their goals.

Episode No.	Title	Written by	Animation studio	Original air date	Theme
1.01	Back Door	Baran Güler	Raatsız	2012	Limon and Oli go to their favorite writer's book signing event. But there is a long line and Proto, the security guard, tells them only one more person can enter the bookstore. But, they both want to meet the author and get his autograph.
1.02	Rock Band	Alp Türkbiner	Raatsız	2013	Limon and Oli want to learn to play musical instruments. Bubs takes them to Proto's music store. Let's see if Team Crazy Eggs will be great musicians.
1.03	May's Cookies	Alp Türkbiner	Raatsız	2013	May bakes delicious cookies and wants to turn her hobby into a business. Limon and Oli do not want to lose May to the business world. They offer to help.
1.04	Chasing Teacher	Alp Türkbiner	Raatsız	2013	Their teacher wants to visit May and have a talk with her after school. Limon and Oli think the teacher will complain about their misbehaviour in class. They have to prevent her from going to May's house.
1.05	Treasure Hunt	Alp Türkbiner	Raatsız	2013	There is a math test the next day. The teacher gives Limon and Oli an old treasure map. Team Crazy Eggs will search the hidden treasure and study for the exam at the same time.
1.06	Power Cut	Baran Güler	Raatsız	2013	Power is gone in Limon's house. To make the best out of the situation the whole family agrees to play bowling until the power is restored. Limon and Oli against May and Bub!
1.07	Secret animal	Baran Güler	Raatsız	2013	Limon and Oli go camping. They meet Proto, the jungleman. They hear voices of mysterious creatures. They are afraid that Proto is hurting the jungle animals. Crazy Eggs have to save the mysterious creatures.
1.08	Mysterious Noise	Alp Türkbiner	Raatsız	2013	It's way passed Limon and Oli's bedtime. They are still on the phone when Limon suddenly hears noises from downstairs. Oli rushes to help. They start chasing what makes the noise.
1.09	Pool Problem	Alp Türkbiner	Raatsız	2013	Limon and Oli go on a vacation with May and Bubs. The kids are very excited for a swim in the pool. But they have to deal with Proto, the lifeguard!
1.10	Young Coaches	Alp Türkbiner	Raatsız	2013	Limon and Oli compete in the basketball tryouts in school. They both want to get into the team.
1.11	Young Pirates	Alp Türkbiner	Raatsız	2013	Limon and Oli break Bubs' antique model ship. Bub is furious. Limon and Oli have to make it up to him.
1.12	To Be Or Not To Be	Baran Güler	Raatsız	2013	Limon and Oli go to watch the actor Proto's new play. Impressed by the show they want to become famous actors like Proto.
1.13	TV	Alp Türkbiner	Raatsız	2013	Limon and Oli want to watch cartoons while Bub wants to watch the news. This starts a small remote control war. All of a sudden the TV signal is gone. They all have to find some other form of entertainment.
1.14	New Neighbor	Alp Türkbiner	Raatsız	2013	Edon, the new kid in the neighborhood, throws a pool party at his house. Limon and Oli think they will lose their popularity to Edon so they try to display all of their talents at the party.
1.15	Talent Show	Baran Güler	Raatsız	2013	Limon and Oli participate in the talent show in school. They want to get the best prize with their rap dance performance.
1.16	Happy Birthday Bubs	Baran Güler	Raatsız	2013	It's Bubs' birthday. There is a surprise party for him!
1.17	Painting Disaster	Salih Memecan, Erge Özcan	Raatsız	2013	Limon and Oli go to Proto's art exhibition. Proto's favorite painting is in a special room. Oli blows a bubble-gum while looking at it and ruins the painting. Team Crazy Eggs tries to fix it before Proto notices.
1.18	Dogsitters	Salih Memecan, Erge Özcan	Raatsız	2013	Limon and Oli have to walk Mrs. Konkiş's dog, Koket. They are excited about their first dogsitting experience.
1.19	A Festival Movie	Baran Güler	Raatsız	2013	There is a famous film festival in town. Limon and Oli produce and submit their own short movies. Proto gives them a hard time with their submissions.
1.20	My Birthday	Salih Memecan, Erge Özcan	Raatsız	2013	Limon and Oli throw birthday parties on the same day. Each of them wants his/her party to be more popular and the competition begins.
1.21	Bigfoot	Salih Memecan, Erge Özcan	Raatsız	2013	Limon and Oli meet Proto, the mountaineer, during their winter vacation in the mountains. Proto warns them about the snow monster, Yeti.
1.22	Little Reporters	Salih Memecan, Erge Özcan	Raatsız	2013	Limon and Oli apply for the journalist position for the school's newspaper.
1.23	A Cute Guest	Salih Memecan, Erge Özcan	Raatsız	2013	Limon and Oli find a kitten while playing snowball. They name him Snowbally and take him home. Team Crazy Eggs will take care of him the whole day without being caught by May and Bubs.
1.24	Quiz Show	Salih Memecan, Erge Özcan	Raatsız	2013	Limon and Oli want to go home and watch a quiz show on TV. On the way home they meet Proto, the voyager, and his best friend Gagari. A small talk with them becomes very handy.
1.25	Messy Room	Salih Memecan, Erge Özcan, Naz Elkorek	Raatsız	2013	Limon and Neyney go to Oli's house after school. Neyney would like to teach them how to dance. But Oli's room is so messed up that they hardly have room to move around.
1.26	Car Race	Salih Memecan, Erge Özcan	Raatsız	2013	Limon and Oli apply for the toycar race. But first they have to build their own toy car.
1.27	Prankster	Alp Türkbiner	Raatsız	2013	Limon and Oli read an article in an old newspaper about an alumnus of their school who has become famous for his pranks. They decide to pursue his legacy.
1.28	The Champion of Champions	Alp Türkbiner	Raatsız	2013	Limon and Oli apply for the online wrestling-game contest. Wrestling champion Proto trains them for the game.

=== Season 2 ===
Episode No.	Title	Written by	Animation studio	Original air date	Theme
2.01	Gold Medal	Meriç Acemi	M6	2014	Limon and Oli find Bubs' gold medal in the attic. They think that Bubs was a successful sportsman and decide to become one just like him.
2.02	A Trip To The Moon	Salih Memecan, Erge Özcan	M6	2014	Limon and Oli go to Akönpokön's secret spaceport. Akönpokön shows them the new spacecraft that he is going to send to the moon. Limon and Oli volunteer to travel in it.
2.03	Bubs' Hiccup	Salih Memecan, Erge Özcan	M6	2014	Bubs is about to give a speech in the cultural center about germs but suddenly starts to have hiccups. Limon and Oli makes plans to stop his hiccup.
2.04	May's Art	Meriç Acemi	M6	2015	May starts designing jewelry. Limon and Oli help her by opening a yard sale booth in the front yard.
2.05	Magic Stone	Meriç Acemi, Salih Memecan, Erge Özcan	M6	2015	Limon and Oli find a stone in the backyard. They imagine that it is magical. They want to find out the stone's superpowers.
2.06	Sweet Trouble Hems	Salih Memecan, Erge Özcan	M6	2015	Mino, the teacher, consigns her adorable hamster to Limon and Oli for the weekend. Limon and Oli have to build natural powered vehicle energy for their science project and take care of the hamster during the weekend.
2.07	Very Very Angry Bird	Salih Memecan, Erge Özcan	M6	2015	Limon has an art project for Mother's Day. She wants to draw a mother bird. She has to find a mother bird, take a photo of her and then draw the picture. But it's too hard on her own. Oli comes to her rescue right away.
2.08	Backup Singer	Salih Memecan, Erge Özcan	M6	2015	Popular band "Biniboom" throws a contest. Oli, a singer wannabe, looks forward to meet the band members and joins the contest with Limon's support.
2.09	My Friend Snowman	Salih Memecan, Erge Özcan	M6	2015	Limon makes a beautiful snowman which makes Gıcıko very jealous. Oli jokes around with Limon and accidentally ruins Gıcıko's snowman. Gıcıko is very angry with him and decides to ruin Limon's snowman in return!
2.10	Big Yellow Boat	Salih Memecan, Erge Özcan	M6	2015	Limon and Oli go on a vacation with their families. They find a treasure map in a bottle in the sea and sail away to find the treasure. Unluckily they find themselves on deserted island with Gıcıko.
2.11	Haunted House	Salih Memecan, Erge Özcan	Digiflame	2015	May and the other moms decides to rent a house for their kids to engage in artistic activities. Limon, who wants to do sculptures and Oli, who realizes that the house is next to the basketball tournament field are very happy. But, the house is rumored to be haunted.
2.12	Tearful Limon	Salih Memecan, Erge Özcan	Digiflame	2015	Limon is very tearful after having bad dreams. She strongly believes that this will ruin her upcoming birthday and she decides to find a way to stop it.
2.13	Accidental Fame	Bruce Bernstein, Salih Memecan	Digiflame	2015	Limon and Oli are in the school band. Limon becomes the laughing stock of school when she accidentally makes a silly sound with her instrument. But surprisingly Limon and her silly sound become a national fame.
2.14	The Telescope	Bruce Bernstein, Salih Memecan	Digiflame	2015	Gıcıko is the nightmare of the school because of her pranks. Oli shows Limon the telescope of Akönpokön and Limon comes up with a good idea. She will observe Gıcıko with it to figure out her next prank.
2.15	Perfect Gift	Bruce Bernstein, Salih Memecan	Digiflame	2015	Limon wants to get the perfect gift for her mom's upcoming birthday. When Oli gets involved, things get even more complicated.
2.16	Dancing Shoes	Bruce Bernstein, Salih Memecan	Digiflame	2015	Limon and Oli claim to have found magical dancing shoes that turn the person who wears them into a great dancer. Kids at school love these shoes and Limon and Oli start to sell them. But things get complicated when kids start to realize that there is no magic with the shoes.
2.17	She Has The Power	Bruce Bernstein, Salih Memecan	Digiflame	2015	Oli realizes his favorite football team scores whenever Limon sneezes. He takes her to a football game, Limon sneezes and the team wins. Limon becomes famous for her sneeze. Bubs takes Limon to the match of his football team. But there is a problem. Limon is not able to sneeze.
2.18	The New Boy In The Town	Bruce Bernstein, Salih Memecan	Digiflame	2015	When Limon starts to spend too much time with the new boy in the town, Bazi, Zeytin gets jealous. He can't stand the idea of losing his best friend to another person and he starts to challenge Bazi.
2.19	The Butterfly Lady	Bruce Bernstein, Salih Memecan	Digiflame	2015	Limon goes to the lakeshore to watch the sunrise and she sees a bizarre woman riding her bicycle. This woman looks exactly like a giant butterfly with antennas on her head and wing shaped arms. Limon gets scared. Limon and Oli decide to find out about her.
2.20	The Secret of Life	Salih Memecan, Erge Özcan, Jeff Treves	AnimaIstanbul	2015	Limon and Oli visit Grand Grand Father. GGF has a loving relationship with his cat, Lokum. Lokum, however, goes nowhere near Limon and Oli. The kids want to find out about the secret of this relationship. GGF tells them it's a big secret, the secret of life. GGF tells them the secret will be revealed by the mountain across his cottage. Limon and Oli go to the mountain to find out about the secret of life.
2.21	The Man Inside	Bruce Bernstein, Salih Memecan, Jeff Treves	AnimaIstanbul	2015	Limon is yet to watch the final episode of her favorite TV show, The Man Inside. She needs a quiet place to watch the episode without any distraction. After trying many remote places in vain, she finally goes to GGF's cottage. GGF has a story.
2.22	The Lost Book	Bruce Bernstein, Salih Memecan, Jeff Treves	AnimaIstanbul	2015	It's the due date and Limon has to return the book to the library. But, she can't find it. Limon is in a panic and with the help of Oli, she looks for the book. Giciko tells them to look into Lost Property Storage where there is a huge watch dog.
2.23	The Mysterious Agent	Salih Memecan, Jeff Treves, Bruce Bernstein	AnimaIstanbul	2015	Limon is a big fan of Mayko and The Gang music group, especially its front man, Mayko. Zeytin is jealous. He tells a lie about Mayko's real identity to prevent Limon for going to their concert. Then a strange thing happens. Bubs, dressed like an agent leaves the house in an utterly mysterious fashion. Limon and Oli chase Bubs to find out his real identity.
2.24	Amusement Park	Salih Memecan, Jeff Treves, Bruce Bernstein	AnimaIstanbul	2015	Limon and Oli go to the new amusement park in town. Limon wants to go on the merry-go-round, Oli wants to try the scariest roller coaster, The Comet. Giciko sees them on the merry-go-round and starts to make fun of Oli. Limon decides to try the Comet to cheer Oli up. But Limon and Oli gets stuck on top of the Comet because of cruel Giciko.
2.25	Checkmate	Salih Memecan, Erge Özcan, Jeff Treves, Bruce Bernstein	AnimaIstanbul	2015	Oli claims being intelligent is way more important than studying hard. They decide to test the idea by playing a chess game. Limon goes through Bubs' harsh training to prepare for the game. Oli makes a deal with Akonpokon. Akonpokon will watch the game secretly and tell Oli the moves he should make.
