= Inside Man (disambiguation) =

Inside Man is a 2006 American crime film directed by Spike Lee.

Inside Man or The Inside Man may also refer to:

== Film and television ==
=== Films ===
- Inside Man: Most Wanted, a 2019 sequel to the 2006 film
- Inside Man (2023 film), a 2023 film

=== Television episodes ===
- "An Inside Man", Star Wars Rebels season 3, episode 10 (2016)
- "Inside Man", Angie Tribeca season 1, episode 9 (2016)
- "Inside Man", Animal Kingdom season 6, episode 4 (2022)
- "Inside Man", Ben 10: Alien Force season 2, episode 9 (2008)
- "Inside Man", Bosch: Legacy season 2, episode 3 (2023)
- "Inside Man", Bourbon Street Beat episode 15 (1960)
- "Inside Man", Chicago Fire season 12, episode 11 (2024)
- "Inside Man", Memphis Beat season 2, episode 2 (2011)
- "Inside Man", Power season 6, episode 6 (2019)
- Inside Man (Star Trek: Voyager), season 7, episode 6 (2000)
- "Inside Man", Stingers season 5, episode 16 (2002)
- "Inside Man", Supernatural (American) season 10, episode 17 (2015)
- Inside Man (The Penguin), episode 2 (2024)
- "Inside Man", Titans season 4, episode 5 (2022)
- The Inside Man (Agents of S.H.I.E.L.D.),season 3, episode 12 (2016)
- "The Inside Man", Barnaby Jones season 5, episode 23 (1977)
- "The Inside Man", Dixon of Dock Green series 11, episode 24 (1965)
- "The Inside Man", Groove High episode 2 (2012)
- "The Inside Man", Knots Landing season 8, episode 13 (1986)
- "The Inside Man", MacGruder and Loud episode 4 (1985)
- "The Inside Man", Mannix season 6, episode 6 (1972)
- "The Inside Man", NCIS season 7, episode 3 (2009)
- "The Inside Man", Rawhide season 4, episode 6 (1961)
- "The Inside Man", Shannon's Deal season 2, episode 6 (1991)
- "The Inside Man", The Adventures of Ellery Queen season 2, episode 9 (1951)
- "The Inside Man", The Dead Zone season 5, episode 5 (2006)
- "The Inside Man", The F.B.I. season 5, episode 12 (1969)
- "The Inside Man", The Nine episode 9 (2009)
- "The Inside Man", The Sentinel season 3, episode 5 (1997)
- "The Inside Man", Winter episode 4 (2015)

=== Television shows ===
- Inside Man (2022 TV series), a British television series
- The Inside Man (1969 TV series), a British television series
- The Inside Man (2019 TV series), a British cybersecurity awareness training web series

== Literature ==
- The Inside Man (1974), a novel by George Harmon Coxe
- The Inside Man (2013), a novella by Nicole D. Peeler, featured in the anthology Carniepunk
- The Inside Man (2014), a novel by Jeff Abbott
- The Inside Man (2020), a novel by M. A. Rothman

== Music ==
- "Inside Man", an unreleased song by SZA

== See also ==
- Inside job (disambiguation)
- The Man Inside
- Inside Men, a 2012 British television series
- Morgan Spurlock Inside Man, an American television series
- A Man on the Inside, an American television series
