= The Man Inside =

The Man Inside may refer to:

== Film ==
- The Man Inside (1916 film), an American silent film directed by John Adolfi
- The Man Inside (1958 film), a British crime adventure film directed by John Gilling
- The Man Inside (1990 film), an American drama film directed by Bobby Roth
- The Man Inside (2012 film), a British boxing film written and directed by Dan Turner, starring David Harewood

== Literature ==
- The Man Inside, a 1914 novel by Natalie Sumner Lincoln, basis for the 1916 film
- The Man Inside, a 1954 novel by M. E. Chaber, basis for the 1958 film
- The Man Inside (novel), a 1968 novel by W. Watts Biggers

== Television ==
- "Man Inside", The Shield season 5, episode 7 (2006)
- "The Man Inside", Limon and Oli season 2, episode 21 (2015)
- "The Man Inside", Little House on the Prairie season 5, episode 4 (1978)

== See also ==
- Inside Man (disambiguation)
- Enakkul Oruvan (disambiguation)
