= Inside Job =

An inside job is a crime committed by a person in a position of trust, or with the help of someone either employed by the victim or entrusted with access to the victim's affairs or premises.

Inside Job may also refer to:

== Books ==
- Inside Job (novella), a 2005 novella by Connie Willis

== Entertainment ==
=== Film ===
- Inside Job (1946 film), a 1946 film noir directed by Jean Yarborough
- Inside Job (2010 film), a 2010 documentary film about the 2008 financial crisis by Charles H. Ferguson

=== Television ===
- The Alpha Caper (also known as The Inside Job), a 1973 crime thriller made-for-TV movie
- Inside Job (2014 TV series), a reality show on TNT
- Inside Job (2021 TV series), an adult animated Netflix original series created by Shion Takeuchi with Alex Hirsch as executive producer
- "Inside Job", a 1994 episode of Melody Rules
- "The Inside Job" (SpongeBob SquarePants), a 2009 episode of SpongeBob SquarePants
- "The Inside Job", a 2010 episode of Leverage
- "Inside Job", a 2012 episode of Transformers: Prime

== Music ==
- Inside Job (Don Henley album), 2000
- Inside Job (Roswell Rudd album), 1976
- Inside Job, 1980 contemporary Christian album by Dion DiMucci

=== Songs ===
- "Inside Job", song on the 1992 album Little Village (album) by the band of the same name
- "Inside Job", song on the 1998 album 40 Dayz & 40 Nightz by Xzibit
- "Inside Job", song on the 2006 album Pearl Jam (album) by the band of the same name

== See also ==
- Inside Man (disambiguation)
