= Enakkul Oruvan =

Enakkul Oruvan (English: A man inside me) can refer to two Indian Tamil-language films:

- Enakkul Oruvan (1984 film), starring Kamal Haasan
- Enakkul Oruvan (2015 film), starring Siddharth

== See also ==
- The Man Inside (disambiguation)
