= Animal Kingdom (TV series) =

2016 American drama television series

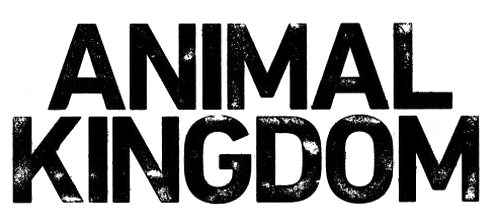
- Genre: Crime drama
- Based on: Animal Kingdom by David Michôd
- Developed by: Jonathan Lisco
- Starring: Ellen Barkin; Scott Speedman; Shawn Hatosy; Ben Robson; Jake Weary; Finn Cole; Daniella Alonso; Molly Gordon; Carolina Guerra; Sohvi Rodriguez; Leila George; Jon Beavers; Rigo Sanchez
- Theme music composer: Atticus Ross & Claudia Sarne
- Composers: Alexis & Sam
- Country of origin: United States
- Original language: English
- No. of seasons: 6
- No. of episodes: 75 (list of episodes)

Production
- Executive producers: Liz Watts; David Michôd; Eliza Clark; Andrew Stearn; Jonathan Lisco; John Wells; Etan Frankel; Christopher Chulack
- Producers: Jinny Howe; Andrew Stearn; Terri Murphy; Llewellyn Wells
- Production locations: Oceanside, California; Los Angeles, California
- Cinematography: Danny Moder; Loren Yaconelli
- Running time: 45–60 minutes
- Production companies: John Wells Productions; Warner Horizon Television (seasons 1–4); Warner Bros. Television (seasons 5–6)

Original release
- Network: TNT
- Release: June 14, 2016 – August 28, 2022

Animal Kingdom is an American crime drama television series developed by Jonathan Lisco. It is based on the 2010 Australian film of the same name, which in turn was inspired by the criminal Pettingill family. The series was produced by David Michôd, who wrote and directed the original film.

Animal Kingdom premiered on TNT on June 14, 2016, with the first season consisting of ten episodes. Starting with the second season, each subsequent season consisted of thirteen episodes. The second season premiered on May 30, 2017. The third season premiered on May 29, 2018. The fourth season premiered on May 28, 2019. The fifth season premiered on July 11, 2021. The sixth and final season premiered on June 19, 2022. The series concluded on August 28, 2022, after six seasons for a total of 75 episodes. It was the final scripted original series to air on TNT before the production of original programming ceased.

== Premise ==
The series centers on Joshua "J" Cody who, after the death of his mother when he was 17 years old, moves in with his estranged relatives, the Codys, who run a criminal family enterprise set in Oceanside, California, that is governed by the respected matriarch Janine "Smurf" Cody.

The Codys partake in numerous criminal activities and pull off various heists to make money. These jobs are undertaken by J's uncles: Barry "Baz" Blackwell, Smurf's adopted son who calls the shots; Andrew "Pope" Cody, the oldest and most dangerous of Smurf's sons; Craig Cody, the tough and fearless middle son; and Deran Cody, the troubled and suspicious youngest son. Associates of the Cody family include Catherine Belen, Baz's live-in girlfriend and mother of their daughter Lena; Nicky Belmont, J's girlfriend and fellow high school student; Lucy, Baz's mistress from Mexico; and Mia Benitez, a young gang member and member of the Trujillo family.

A younger Smurf, who is a member of a crew of career criminals while establishing her future criminal enterprise, is also depicted in the years 1977, 1984, 1992, and 1999. Members of her crew include Jake Dunmore, her on-again/off-again boyfriend; Manny, the leader of her crew, and later her children; Andrew and Baz, and her only daughter, Julia Cody.

== Cast and characters ==
- Ellen Barkin as Janine "Smurf" Cody, the tough matriarch of the Cody family and J's estranged grandmother who runs a respected criminal enterprise in Oceanside, California. She is very protective of her family and presents a borderline-incestuous love towards them. (seasons 1–4)
  - Smurf is also portrayed by Rimea Kasprzak during flashbacks in 1966 (guest season 1) and by Leila George during flashbacks in 1977, 1984, 1992 and 1999 as a member of a crew of ruthless career criminals as she develops her criminal skillset while raising a young family. (seasons 5–6; recurring season 4)
- Scott Speedman as Barry "Baz" Blackwell, Smurf's adopted son who is the leader in the Cody family's heists but begins to question how Smurf runs their jobs. (seasons 1–3; guest season 6)
  - Baz is also portrayed by Reeve Baker during flashbacks in 1984 (guest season 5) and by Darren Mann during flashbacks in 1992 and 1999. (recurring season 6)
- Shawn Hatosy as Andrew "Pope" Cody, the oldest Cody son, who has mental illness and OCD for most of his life, and even considers suicide. After having served three years in Folsom State Prison, for a bank robbery job gone wrong, he returns to the Cody family.
  - Pope is also portrayed by Houston Towe during flashbacks in 1984 (recurring season 5) and by Kevin Csolak during flashbacks in 1992 and 1999. (recurring season 6)
- Ben Robson as Craig Cody, the middle Cody son, who has a predilection for drugs and extremely risky activities. Often unpredictable, and less reliable than his brothers, he finds enjoyment in the criminal lifestyle and throwing parties. He is also in an on-again/off-again relationship with his girlfriend, drug dealer Renn Randall.
  - Craig is also portrayed by Oz Kalvan during flashbacks in 1992 (recurring season 6) and by Jack Michael Doke during flashbacks in 1999. (guest season 6)
- Jake Weary as Deran Cody, the youngest Cody son and a former competitive surfer who is not as ruthless as his older brothers. He attempts to distance himself from the Cody family's criminal activities and is in a complicated relationship with his boyfriend, fellow surfer Adrian Dolan.
  - Deran is also portrayed by Cyrus Blomberg during flashbacks in 1992 (recurring season 6) and by Dexter Hobert during flashbacks in 1999. (guest season 6)
- Finn Cole as Joshua "J" Cody, Smurf's grandson who moves in with her and his uncles at the Cody family estate following the death of his mother, Julia Cody, who was Smurf's only daughter and Pope's twin sister. He must quickly adapt to his family's criminal lifestyle and is the only one who will challenge Smurf.
- Daniella Alonso as Catherine Belen, Baz's girlfriend, and the mother of their daughter, Lena Blackwell. Pope also has had an obsessive infatuation with her in the past. (season 1)
- Molly Gordon as Nicky Belmont, J's girlfriend and fellow high school student who becomes close with the Codys. (seasons 1–3)
- Carolina Guerra as Lucy, Baz's mistress from Mexico with whom he has a recurring romance. She is also the head of a Mexican gang with her brother Marco. (seasons 2–3; recurring season 1)
- Sohvi Rodriguez as Mia Benitez, a tough young woman raised in a gang, led by her cousin Pete Trujillo, who is very rough around the edges. (season 4; recurring season 3)
- Jon Beavers as Jake Dunmore, a member of Smurf's crew of ruthless career criminals from 1977 to 1984 and her on-again/off-again boyfriend. (season 5; recurring season 4)
  - Jake is also portrayed by Jack Conley in the present day, now Craig's father. (guest seasons 1, 4; recurring season 2)
- Rigo Sanchez as Manny, the leader of Smurf's crew of ruthless career criminals from 1977 to 1984. He also briefly appeared in season 2 in the present day, portrayed by an uncredited actor. (season 5; recurring season 4)

== Episodes ==
Season	Episodes	Originally released	
Season	Episodes	First released	Last released
1	10	June 14, 2016	August 9, 2016
2	13	May 30, 2017	August 29, 2017
3	13	May 29, 2018	August 21, 2018
4	13	May 28, 2019	August 20, 2019
5	13	July 11, 2021	October 3, 2021
6	13	June 19, 2022	August 28, 2022

== Production ==
TNT ordered the pilot of Animal Kingdom in May 2015; Barkin and Speedman were the first to be cast in July 2015, as matriarch Smurf and her adopted son Baz, respectively. In August, Cole and Weary were added as J and Deran, with Hatosy and Robson soon cast as the remaining Cody brothers Pope and Craig. Alonso was later announced as Baz's wife Catherine, and Molly Gordon as J's girlfriend Nicky.

The project was picked up to series with a 10-episode order in December 2015. The show debuted on June 14, 2016, and on July 6, 2016, TNT renewed it for a 13-episode second season. On July 27 TNT announced it would be renewing Animal Kingdom for a third season, which premiered on May 29, 2018. The season 3 premiere was aired after a game on TNT beginning 12:30/11:30 central the day before the premiere. On July 2, 2018, TNT renewed the series for a fourth season. Production on the fourth season began on January 10, 2019. The fourth season premiered on May 28, 2019.

On July 24, 2019, TNT renewed the series for a fifth season. On March 16, 2020, production on the fifth season was suspended "until further notice" due to the global COVID-19 pandemic. Production on the fifth season resumed on September 7, 2020. Filming for the season wrapped on December 11, 2020. On January 14, 2021, ahead of the fifth-season premiere, TNT renewed the series for a sixth and final season. Production on the final season began on March 6, 2021. Filming for the season wrapped on August 12, 2021.

== Reception ==
=== Critical response ===
The first season of Animal Kingdom has received positive reviews. On review aggregator website Rotten Tomatoes, the season has an approval rating of 76% based on 33 reviews. The consensus is: "Bolstered by Ellen Barkin's acting prowess, Animal Kingdom is a darkly intriguing, although occasionally predictable, twisted family drama." On Metacritic, the series has a score of 65 out of 100, based on 27 critics, indicating "generally favorable reviews".

=== Ratings ===
Viewership and ratings per season of Animal Kingdom
Season	Timeslot (ET)	Episodes	First aired		Last aired		Avg. viewers (millions)	Avg. 18–49 rating
Season	Timeslot (ET)	Episodes	Date	Viewers (millions)	Date	Viewers (millions)	Avg. viewers (millions)	Avg. 18–49 rating
1	Tuesday 9:00 pm	10	June 14, 2016	1.31	August 9, 2016	1.51	1.27	0.43
2	Tuesday 9:00 pm	13	May 30, 2017	1.19	August 29, 2017	1.41	1.17	0.38
3	Tuesday 9:00 pm	13	May 29, 2018	1.61	August 21, 2018	1.37	1.31	0.39
4	Tuesday 9:00 pm	13	May 28, 2019	1.35	August 20, 2019	1.39	1.21	0.33
5	Sunday 9:00 pm	13	July 11, 2021	0.76	October 3, 2021	0.68	TBD	TBD
6	Sunday 9:00 pm	13	June 19, 2022	0.47	August 28, 2022	0.90	TBD	TBD

=== Accolades ===
Year	Award	Category	Recipient(s) and nominee(s)	Result	Ref.
2017	Saturn Awards	Best Action-Thriller Television Series	Animal Kingdom	Nominated	
2018	Saturn Awards	Best Action-Thriller Television Series	Animal Kingdom	Nominated	

== International broadcast ==
In Australia, Bangladesh, Saudi Arabia, the Netherlands and the UK, it is available on Netflix.

In Canada, the show is broadcast on CTV Drama Channel, formerly known as Bravo, and all seasons are available on Netflix and Crave. Beginning with its fourth season, the episodes were broadcast on Bravo at the same time and day as the original TNT broadcasts. In French, the show airs on Z.

In France, the series is broadcast on Warner TV since February 8, 2018.

In Brazil, the series is available on Netflix.

In Belgium, the series is available on Amazon Prime Video 2022.

== Syndication ==
All episodes of the first through sixth seasons are available in the U.S. on Amazon Prime and Netflix. Seasons 1 through 6 in the U.K.

== Home media ==
The first season was released in DVD and Blu-ray formats on April 28, 2017. Each set contains behind-the-scenes featurettes and deleted scenes. The home media for the first two season's DVD releases were distributed by Warner Bros. Home Entertainment. For Season 3, the Warner Archive Collection label also produced the Blu-ray format starting with Season 2, and began manufacture on demand DVD releases for the remaining seasons.
