= List of Animal Kingdom episodes =

Animal Kingdom is an American drama television series developed by Jonathan Lisco, based on the 2010 Australian film by David Michôd. The series follows Josh "J" Cody (Finn Cole), who, after the death of his mother when he is 17 years old, moves in with the Codys, a criminal family clan governed by matriarch Janine "Smurf" Cody (Ellen Barkin). Animal Kingdom debuted on TNT on June 14, 2016.

On July 6, 2016, the series was renewed for a second season of thirteen episodes. On July 27, 2017, TNT renewed the series for a third season. On July 2, 2018, TNT renewed the series for a fourth season. On July 24, 2019, TNT renewed the series for a fifth season. On January 14, 2021, ahead of the fifth season premiere, TNT renewed the series for a sixth and final season. The final season premiered on June 19, 2022.

During the course of the series, 75 episodes of Animal Kingdom aired, between June 14, 2016, and August 28, 2022.

== Series overview ==
Season	Episodes	Originally released	
Season	Episodes	First released	Last released
1	10	June 14, 2016	August 9, 2016
2	13	May 30, 2017	August 29, 2017
3	13	May 29, 2018	August 21, 2018
4	13	May 28, 2019	August 20, 2019
5	13	July 11, 2021	October 3, 2021
6	13	June 19, 2022	August 28, 2022

== Episodes ==
=== Season 1 (2016) ===
No. overall	No. in season	Title	Directed by	Written by	Original release date	Prod. code	U.S. viewers (millions)
1	1	"Pilot"	John Wells	Teleplay by : Jonathan Lisco	June 14, 2016 (Note: The pilot episode was released online on June 1, 2016 and shown on TNT after a basketball playoff game.)	296038 / U11.10042	1.31
After his mother Julia dies of an overdose, 17-year-old Joshua "J" Cody goes to stay with his estranged grandmother Janine, otherwise known as "Smurf", who runs a criminal enterprise in Oceanside, California. J meets his uncles: Craig, Deran, and their adopted brother, Baz. J reveals Julia's death to his rebellious girlfriend Nicky. The Codys are surprised when their unstable eldest brother Pope returns unannounced from serving a three-year sentence for a bank robbery. The Codys organize a smash and grab robbery, and Pope enlists J to secure a car for the job against Smurf's orders. While trying to steal a car, J gets punched by the car's owner before Pope steps in. The brothers loot a jewelry store and steal valuable watches. In the process, Craig gets shot and Deran accidentally injures a security guard.
2	2	"We Don't Hurt People"	John Wells	Jonathan Lisco	June 14, 2016	U13.12352	1.10
Baz finds out from his wife, Catherine, that the security guard was actually a moonlighting cop and has died from his injuries. Following the botched robbery, Smurf creates discord among the boys when she demands they destroy the car and the valuable watches. Pope convinces J to lie to Smurf about what transpired during the car robbery; J later reveals what happened to Baz. J accidentally walks in on Deran having sex with another man, Adrian, to which Deran severely beats Adrian in front of J to cover up his own sexuality. Pope visits Catherine, whom he had a previous fling with, and confronts her about their past relationship; Catherine turns him down. Worried about Pope's mental instability, Smurf steals pills from a neighbor and secretly crushes them into Pope's food. When Craig's gunshot injury worsens, Baz takes Craig to a hospital in Mexico to tend to his wound. While in Mexico, Baz receives a visit from a woman named Lucy; the two share a passionate kiss.
3	3	"Stay Close, Stick Together"	Christopher Chulack	Eliza Clark	June 21, 2016	U13.12353	1.18
In Mexico, Baz spends time with Lucy and her son, while Craig attempts to smuggle drugs across the Mexico-US border as a favor for Lucy's brother Marco. Deran tries to collect rent money from Adrian, who refuses and instead requests that Deran pay his medical bills. Smurf attempts to intimidate Catherine by kidnapping her daughter Lena, who is being watched by a babysitter, at a grocery store. The incident further exacerbates the tension between Smurf and Catherine. Pope takes Deran and J on a side job behind Smurf and Baz's back; Pope is impressed by J's willingness and participation during the job, angering Deran. Later, Deran attempts to drown J in the pool, after which J packs his bags and secretly runs away. Smurf tracks down J's phone and catches up with him at the train station. She convinces him to stay and also suggests that Baz is J's biological father.
4	4	"Dead to Me"	Karen Gaviola	Etan Frankel	June 28, 2016	U13.12354	1.19
The boys organize an elaborate celebration for Pope's birthday, leading Smurf to suspect they are running side jobs without her permission. When nobody fesses up to the moonlighting, Smurf cuts them off and kicks everyone out of the house. Upon learning of Pope and J's secret side job, Smurf lets J stay at the house, but warns him about lying. Baz's biological father, Ray Blackwell, goes missing. Nicky spends the day with Smurf, while J bonds with Catherine. Pope and J share an intimate conversation about Julia, who was Pope's twin sister, and the two visit her gravesite. Craig discovers his drug dealer girlfriend Renn overdosing. Unsure of what to do, he leaves Renn's body on the floor and steals some of her jewelry and drugs. The next day, Craig receives a call from Renn at the hospital, and she orders Craig to find out who stole from her.
5	5	"Flesh Is Weak"	Christopher Chulack	Megan Martin	July 5, 2016	U13.12355	1.39
Despite Smurf letting the boys return to work, Deran refuses to come home. Adrian cuts off his relationship with Deran, confronting him for hiding his sexuality from his family. In exchange for Deran to come home, Pope kidnaps Adrian's new boyfriend and throws him in the ocean; Adrian lambasts Deran and criticizes his relationship with Smurf. Renn believes that her friend, Sage, was the one who stole from her. Under Renn's instructions, Craig violently beats up Sage. Smurf and Baz meet with Nicky's parents, and Baz questions Nicky about her father's military background. J attends an art gallery with his teacher, Alexa. Smurf attends the same gallery and is startled to recognize a man in one of the photographs; Smurf flirts with the photographer to get more information about the man's identity. J begins a sexual relationship with Alexa, who is later revealed to be an informant.
6	6	"Child Care"	Regina King	Etan Frankel	July 12, 2016	U13.12356	1.25
After trying to buy heroin from an undercover cop, Alexa has been forced to become an informant for Detective Yates, who is running an investigation on the Codys. Alexa and J grow closer. Pope gets arrested for failing a drug test, and he discovers that Smurf has been sneaking pills into his food; Smurf convinces him to continue taking his medications. Catherine discovers that Baz is still visiting Ray. Renn concludes that Craig was the one who stole from her, and she and her friends tie Craig naked to a chair. When they extort him for $6,800, Craig is forced to call Smurf to bail him out. Baz wants to get Nicky's lieutenant father, Paul, involved in a heist to steal a shipment of cash passing through Camp Pendleton. After Pope and Deran rob Nicky's house, J realizes his uncles are responsible and breaks up with Nicky to protect her. Baz is angered and approaches Smurf, warning her that J may be a liability.
7	7	"Goddamn Animals"	Tim Southam	Eliza Clark	July 19, 2016	U13.12357	1.22
Flashbacks from Smurf's childhood depict a man named Isaiah, a former boyfriend of Smurf's mother Miriam. Following a botched robbery in which Miriam was shot, Isaiah drove away, leaving her to die. In the present, Smurf leaves town to visit Isaiah, the man in the art gallery photo, at the auto body shop he works at; Isaiah does not recognize her. Smurf initially intends to kill Isaiah, but when Isaiah fondly reminisces on old memories about Miriam and a young Smurf, she decides not to go through with the plan. Baz implores a reluctant Paul to help them with the upcoming heist, while Pope's old prison buddy, Vin, threatens Baz and Pope into letting him partake in the heist. Worried about Pope's behavior, Catherine confides in her police friend Patrick. Craig reveals his knowledge of Deran's sexuality and encourages him to make up with Adrian. Alexa and J continue their sexual relationship; Alexa betrays Detective Yates and reveals to J that she is wearing a wire.
8	8	"Man In"	Larry Teng	Megan Martin	July 26, 2016	U13.12358	1.23
Paul hesitantly agrees to help the Codys prepare for the upcoming heist. Baz and Pope pay off Vin for $10,000, after which Pope affirms that Vin is now out of his life. Feeling betrayed and abandoned, Vin visits the Cody house and reveals to Smurf that he knows the secrets of their family; Smurf runs him off the property with a shotgun. Patrick refers Catherine to Detective Yates, who reveals that Smurf was responsible for the death of Catherine's parents. Stunned by the revelation, Catherine refuses to become an informant but makes plans to run away, packing a bag for herself and Lena. J asks Baz if he is his biological father. Upon discovering that Ray is newly sober, Baz confronts him for the abuse he endured as a child and violently pours a bottle of booze down his father's throat. Assuming that J and Alexa are in a relationship, Nicky shows up at the Cody house to confront J, but ends up bonding with Craig; Nicky later tells J that she had sex with Craig. Angered, J breaks down and opens up to Alexa.
9	9	"Judas Kiss"	Christopher Chulack	John Wells	August 2, 2016	U13.12359	1.32
The Codys finish off the military base heist with Paul. Pope, Baz, Craig and Deran enter the base ostensibly to play paintball, but sneak off. Following Baz's plan, they switch a portion of the stored cash with fake bills, and stash what they have stolen in waste barrels to be transported off base. J agrees to talk to Detective Yates, but is hesitant to implicate the rest of the family. Yates manipulates Alexa into seducing J to get a confession. After Catherine steals money from Smurf's house, Smurf deduces that Catherine is talking to the cops and manipulates Pope into confronting her. Pope visits Catherine and confronts her for stealing money from Smurf. Realizing she is in danger, Catherine tries to seduce Pope; he smothers her with a pillow and buries her dead body.
10	10	"What Have You Done?"	John Wells	Jonathan Lisco	August 9, 2016	U13.12360	1.51
Smurf tries to keep Baz from figuring out the truth about Catherine by framing Vin. Believing that Vin was involved in Catherine's disappearance, Baz nearly beats him to death before Pope stops him. Pope then confronts Smurf over her manipulation and getting him to do her dirty work. The money from the Camp Pendleton heist comes through, and Craig and Deran collect the money from the waste barrels, which are being transported in the back of a truck. Paul asks for a larger cut of the money, but is sternly denied by Smurf. Deciding against implicating his family, J gets Alexa to confess that Yates blackmailed her to sleep with him. After tricking the police into conducting a raid at the Cody house, J reveals that he has implicated Yates by recording the confession on his phone, forcing Yates to end her investigation of the Codys and Alexa getting arrested for the drug charges. Smurf visits Isaiah at his house; she shoots him in the chest and head.

=== Season 2 (2017) ===
No. overall	No. in season	Title	Directed by	Written by	Original release date	Prod. code	U.S. viewers (millions)
11	1	"Eat What You Kill"	Christopher Chulack	Jonathan Lisco	May 30, 2017	U13.12551	1.19
After a risky job goes wrong, the boys blame Smurf and cut her out of future jobs. Smurf lambasts all the boys for "ganging up on her", resulting in an argument between Smurf and Baz. After Craig and Deran also decide to leave, Smurf cuts off their credit cards. Pope and Baz plan their next heist, while Deran tells Craig about his plan to open a bar, hoping to make a life for himself outside of his family's criminal enterprise. Nicky refuses to move to Guam with her family and decides to stay with Craig, who seems to have lost interest in their relationship. J asks Smurf if he can still live in the Cody house; Smurf lets him. Baz continues to deal with Catherine's disappearance, and he tells Lucy that Catherine left him. Pope continues to feel grief over his involvement in Catherine's death. Smurf receives a visit from a man named Javi, who tells her to visit a dying man named Manny; Smurf agrees to visit Manny on her own terms.
12	2	"Karma"	Thomas Carter	Eliza Clark	June 6, 2017	U13.12552	1.05
The brothers plan their big job without Smurf: casing a megachurch. While visiting the church, Pope bonds with churchgoer Amy. Upon learning that the boys are doing their own jobs, Smurf changes the locks and passwords on all her properties. While Pope looks after Lena, Baz hires a private investigator to look into Catherine's disappearance. Lucy is disconcerted to learn that Lena is still living with Baz, believing that Catherine would not have left without her daughter. Baz ultimately convinces Lucy to stay by telling her that Catherine left him because she found out about their affair. When a fire accidentally breaks out in Craig's apartment, Smurf invites Nicky and Craig to live at the Cody house. Craig refuses to do so, instead deciding to stay with Deran. The boys organize a quick robbery to give Deran cash to buy the bar. Smurf finds out that Manny has died, and she invites J to join her at the wake.
13	3	"Bleed for It"	J. Michael Muro	Megan Martin	June 13, 2017	U13.12553	0.96
Smurf and J attend Manny's funeral; Smurf has a tense reunion with Javi, who is revealed to have been an old acquaintance of the Cody family in his childhood. Following the funeral, Smurf tells J that Manny mentored her when she was younger, and also instructs J to "put a bullet in my head" if she ever turns senile like Manny. The two rob a diner on the way home. Pope attends bible study at the megachurch and continues to bond with Amy, who admits that she lost custody of her son in a drunk-driving incident. Lena asks Pope if Catherine is dead. As Deran and Craig prepare to open the bar, Deran worries that being an ex-con will cause trouble with the liquor license inspector, and he is upfront about his criminal past upon meeting with the inspector. Baz goes to Mexico to visit Lucy and gather supplies for the church heist. Craig's father, Jake, warns Smurf that Manny recorded tapes of his memories before his death; a suspicious Javi is later seen listening to the tapes.
14	4	"Broken Boards"	Emmy Rossum	Etan Frankel	June 20, 2017	U13.12554	1.13
Smurf teaches J the economic side of the family business, while Baz discovers that Smurf has changed the codes on the family storage spaces. Baz tries to get the boys together by jumping off an eight story crane, but Craig quits the church heist nevertheless. Pope and Amy go on their first date, and Pope confesses that he spent some time in prison. Smurf finds out about Deran's bar through Nicky, leading Deran to invite Smurf to the opening night. The bar's opening night is successful, although Deran clashes with Craig, who openly snorts drugs and invites the underaged Nicky. Adrian also arrives at the opening night to show his support. Outside the bar, Deran gets into a confrontation with Smurf; he questions Smurf's relationships with her sons and comes out to her.
15	5	"Forgive Us Our Trespasses"	Laura Innes	T.J. Brady & Rasheed Newson	June 27, 2017	U13.12555	1.17
Smurf takes J to a shooting range to teach him how to shoot. Javi and his gang kidnap Smurf and take her to the desert. Javi reveals that he knows Smurf killed his father, and blackmails her for $300,000, threatening to give Manny's recordings to the police. When the boys fail to answer her calls, Smurf returns to Oceanside after hitchhiking a truck driver. Nicky flirts with J, who has moved into Deran's room. Baz, J, Pope and Deran commence the megachurch robbery; Pope helps Baz and J sneak into the vents to steal a safe under the church's floor, while Deran keeps an eye on the security guard. The heist is ultimately successful, although J severely injures his leg during the heist. Amy invites Pope to her house, and the two become intimate for the first time. Craig, annoyed over the church heist, goes on a bender and recklessly drives his motorcycle while high on cocaine; he ends up crashing at the beach and is found by the police.
16	6	"Cry Havoc"	Larry Teng	Jonathan Lisco	July 11, 2017	U13.12556	1.17
Craig gets bailed out of jail by Nicky. Baz is confronted by Patrick, who is investigating Catherine's disappearance. Amy is interviewed by the police over the church robbery. Smurf reunites with Craig's father Jake, who has been beaten by Javi's crew and instructs Smurf to pay Javi. Smurf recruits J, and they collect the $300,000 from Smurf's secret storage unit. Smurf later meets up with Jake, who ties her up at gunpoint and steals the $300,000. That night, Javi and his crew break into the Cody house and catch J and Nicky. They brutally attack J and hold Nicky hostage. After Javi's crew leave the house with Nicky, Pope and Smurf arrive and discover J beaten up. Smurf receives a call from Nicky, who has been dropped off at the corner of Trailhead and Ash – the location where Smurf buried Javi's father, Lou.
17	7	"Dig"	David Rodriguez	Eliza Clark	July 18, 2017	U13.12557	1.27
Following J and Nicky's attack, Smurf organizes the boys and claims that Manny was the one who killed Lou, but Jake buried the body with her gun. The boys agree to dig up Lou's body and the gun so the murder will not be traced back to Smurf. Since Jake stole her money, Baz loans Smurf the $300,000 from the church heist, although he questions Smurf over how she got the initial $300,000 to pay Javi. Baz tells Pope about the confrontation with Patrick, and reveals that he now believes Catherine is dead. Baz and Smurf meet up with Javi's crew; Smurf directly confronts Javi, coldly telling him that she did not take him in as a child because he is "stupid and angry and impulsive, just like [his] father." Javi pulls a gun on Smurf, but a member of Javi's crew, having been paid off by Smurf, shoots Javi in the head. The Codys subsequently dispose of Lou's body and the gun, seemingly leaving Smurf in the clear.
18	8	"Grace"	Cherie Nowlan	Megan Martin	July 25, 2017	U13.12558	1.10
Growing suspicious of Smurf's cash flow, Baz puts a tracker in Smurf's purse and tracks her down to the storage unit, after which he discovers that Smurf has been skimming money from their jobs. As police officers pressure Amy on the megachurch robbery, Pope deflects their suspicions by framing Leon, an ex-con at the church. J discovers that Nicky is still pursuing a relationship with Craig. In response, J invites a girl from school to the Cody house, making Nicky jealous. Craig begins working for a yacht company in preparation for a wedding yacht heist. Deran tells Adrian his plans to leave the crime business; Adrian wonders if the Cody brothers will accept Deran's decision. After discovering that Patrick has an informant file on Catherine, Baz concludes that Smurf is responsible for Catherine's death.
19	9	"Custody"	Gary Goldman	Etan Frankel	August 1, 2017	U13.12559	1.21
Craig tells the brothers about his plan for the next heist: robbing a yacht wedding. Baz believes the idea is risky and decides against partaking in the heist, leading Deran and Craig to enlist Marco for the job. Nicky looks into purchasing a gun, but is shut down by the store owner for being underaged. Baz tells Pope he believes Smurf killed Catherine. Feeling guilty, Pope confides in Amy, telling her that he "hurt someone"; Amy shows Pope forgiveness and insists that he is a good person. Later, Pope witnesses Amy being lambasted by her brother for trying to gift her son a pet dog; Pope comforts Amy, and the two have sex. Smurf tracks down Jake and discovers he has spent most of the $300,000; she tasers Jake and shoots him in the leg before collecting the remainder of the money. Unbeknownst to Smurf, Baz has recruited J to help him rob her storage unit, though J does not know it belongs to Smurf.
20	10	"Treasure"	Josef Wladyka	T.J. Brady & Rasheed Newson	August 8, 2017	U13.12560	1.20
The Codys, Nicky and Marco begin the yacht heist. While Nicky distracts the coast guard, the boys successfully invade the yacht wedding and rob all the partygoers. J and Nicky rekindle. Craig reunites with Renn; he apologizes and implores her to join him on a trip to Las Vegas. Following the robbery of her storage unit, Smurf grows suspicious of Baz and J. She attacks the storage unit attendant, who confirms that Baz was at her storage locker. In an attempt to implicate Smurf, Baz digs up Javi's body and shoots the head with Smurf's gun. Smurf plants a secret microphone at Baz's house. Baz buys a new house and reveals to Lucy that he has hidden Smurf's storage unit money behind the house walls. Baz also tells Lucy that he wants to move in with her in Mexico.
21	11	"The Leopard"	Michael Morris	Eliza Clark	August 15, 2017	U13.12561	1.16
In exchange for helping with the yacht heist, Marco enlists Craig and Deran for a human trafficking job. Craig and Deran bring the hostage to the designated location, and Marco pays the brothers. Shortly after, Lucy arrives and pistol whips Marco, revealing her association with the cartel. While searching through Smurf's storage unit, Baz discovers a file containing police photographs of a young Baz having been beaten; Baz brings the photographs to Ray and confronts him. Pope stalks Patrick and discovers that Catherine never became an informant for the police. Overcome with guilt, Pope angrily confronts Smurf, and then tearfully confesses to Amy that he murdered someone; Amy is distraught and orders him to leave. Baz tells Smurf that he robbed her storage unit. Suspecting that things may go awry with Baz, Smurf prepares J to become her power of attorney should it become necessary. Baz then calls the cops on Smurf, who is arrested in connection to Javi's murder.
22	12	"You Will Be Gutted"	Larry Teng	Jonathan Lisco	August 22, 2017	U13.12562	1.22
Baz reveals the contents of Smurf's storage unit to the boys, and also reveals that he and Lena are moving to Mexico with Lucy. While in police custody, Smurf tries to prove that Baz framed her for Javi's murder, but J discovers that Baz has erased the house's security footage of him stealing Smurf's gun. Craig and Deran discuss their future. J and Nicky have sex. Following his revelation to Amy, Pope contemplates suicide. During a party at the Cody house, Lena is left unattended and nearly gets hit by a car; Pope criticizes Baz for his poor parenting. Wanting to secure a future for Lena financially, Pope opens a trust fund for Lena and robs numerous banks to deposit the money. Baz is angered to discover that J is Smurf's power of attorney, and Lucy tries to manipulate J by implying that Baz is his father. Baz later confronts J, telling him they will settle things with the lawyer.
23	13	"Betrayal"	John Wells	John Wells	August 29, 2017	U13.12563	1.41
After finding out she will be in jail for longer than expected, Smurf meets with Detective Pearce, who offers her a shorter sentence if she rats out her boys. J pays a Hispanic gang to protect Smurf in jail. Nicky and J prepare for their graduation; Nicky anticipates reuniting with her parents, but they fail to show up at the graduation ceremony. J and Nicky rob a house. Baz visits Smurf in jail, and she informs Baz that Pope knows what happened to Catherine. Baz then confronts Pope, who confesses Catherine's murder. In an unexpected gesture, Baz embraces Pope and forgives him. Overwhelmed by his family, Craig reveals to Deran that he is leaving. He visits Renn, and the two go on an impromptu road trip. As Baz and Lucy prepare to leave for Mexico, Baz is shot by an unknown assailant. Lucy leaves Baz for dead, and she and Marco steal the money and jewelry that Baz took from Smurf.

=== Season 3 (2018) ===
- Episode 1 was the highest rated and most watched episode of the season and series.

No. overall	No. in season	Title	Directed by	Written by	Original release date	Prod. code	Viewers (millions)
24	1	"The Killing"	John Wells	John Wells	May 29, 2018 (Note: This episode was shown as a special preview following an NBA games aftershow ahead of the timeslot premiere on May 29. The timeslot premiere pulled 1.3 million viewers and a 0.4 18–49 rating.)	U13.13001	1.61
Following the shootout, Baz is rushed to a hospital; he dies on the operating table. After being informed by police officers, Pope reveals Baz's death to his brothers, while Detective Pearce tells the news to Smurf. In the aftermath of Baz's death, the boys discuss what will happen next, and Nicky raises concerns about Lena being taken into foster care. J expresses his suspicions of Craig, who has skipped town to Mexico with Renn. After speaking with Lucy, Pope believes that Smurf and J are responsible for Baz's death. Smurf instructs a group of men, which includes gang leader Pete Trujillo, to visit Baz's house and collect her money. They discover the money already stolen, leaving Smurf to contemplate who stole it.
25	2	"In the Red"	David Rodriguez	Eliza Clark	June 5, 2018	U13.13002	1.22
Months after Baz's death, the Codys have tried to move on. Craig and Renn have been living in Mexico, though they return to Oceanside after Craig is beaten and robbed by a local gang. Deran has been pulling risky jobs with his own crew, and Nicky informs J about Deran's secret jobs. Deran and Adrian are seeing each other, although Deran encourages Adrian to leave town to surf competitively. Pope deals with raising Lena, who is being bullied at school. Lucy gives Pope the police file on Baz's death. J has a fling with Pete's cousin Mia, the go-between he pays for Smurf's protection in jail. Smurf navigates prison politics while telling J how to manage the family's money. J is laundering money going through Smurf's properties, but her funds are dwindling; J warns his uncles that they may lose more properties, and proclaims that they need to pull a job.
26	3	"The Center Will Hold"	Alex Zakrzewski	Daniele Nathanson	June 12, 2018	U13.13003	1.16
A flashback reveals that Mia shot and killed Baz. In the present, J and Mia continue their money/pleasure relationship. Nicky is pressured into performing sexual acts for her drug dealer Dylan, whom she owes $1,000. Nicky ends up getting J to bail her out, while Mia pistol-whips Dylan. Craig and Renn break up and Craig ponders moving back home. Craig and Deran destroy real estate properties that compete with their own, and they also reunite with their former friend, Linc, who is now a nurse. Pope transfers Lena to a new private school. After gaining information from inmate Alvarez, Smurf organizes a pill mill job from behind bars, which J pushes the family to do. While J and Pope scout the job, Smurf and Alvarez disagree over the job's cut; Smurf then plants heroin in Alvarez's cell, causing Alvarez to get transferred to isolation.
27	4	"Wolves"	James Hanlon	Bradley Paul	June 19, 2018	U13.13004	1.33
Smurf demands that the DA provide the forensics report which proves that the bullet from Smurf's gun was fired after Javi's murder, but Pearce stalls in hopes that Smurf will incriminate her boys. The Codys successfully execute the pill mill job. Upon investigating the robbery, Pearce suspects that the Codys are involved. At the bar, Deran reconnects with Linc. The Cody boys meet Mia, who has moved into Smurf's house. Feeling threatened by Mia moving in, Nicky stalks Mia to a local bar. The two end up having drinks, and Nicky cheats on J with another man; Nicky later confesses her infidelity to J. Deran's father, Billy, and his girlfriend Frankie visit the Cody house. J informs Smurf of Billy's return; Smurf orders J to get Billy out of the house.
28	5	"Prey"	Megan Griffiths	Addison McQuigg	June 26, 2018	U13.13005	1.31
Billy and Mia each ignore Pope's suggestions that they move out. Deran and Linc have sex. Lena gets in trouble at school after cutting off another girl's ponytail, and Lena's teacher suggests that Pope take her to grief counseling. Pearce begins to grow suspicious over J's money orders, leading J to meet with each tenant of Smurf's properties to confirm their "rental agreement." Craig confronts Smurf over her previous investments into a local surf team; Smurf reveals that the investment was a payoff due to an old incident involving Craig and another surfer, in which the surfer ended up paralyzed. Growing increasingly isolated from J, a depressed Nicky packs her bags and calls Paul, asking if she can stay with him in Guam; Paul turns her down. Returning home, Nicky contemplates shooting heroin with Billy.
29	6	"Broke from the Box"	Mark Strand	Matt Kester	July 3, 2018	U13.13006	1.20
Smurf discovers that the DA claims to have a witness to Javi's murder, despite the ballistics report showing that Smurf did not fire the fatal shot. Smurf orders J to drive to the desert and track down Javi's gang; J hesitates but eventually agrees. Frankie pays J in exchange for her and Billy to stay at the Cody house. Craig, Deran and J get into a turf fight with a Brazilian gang and rob them. After the incident at Lena's school, Pope receives a visit from Child and Family Services, who want to speak with Lena. Nicky and J's relationship continues to falter. After the two get into an argument, Nicky gets high on Billy's heroin and accidentally shoots herself with a gun. J drives Nicky to the hospital and leaves her bleeding at the front entrance before driving off.
30	7	"Low Man"	Cherie Nowlan	Eliza Clark	July 10, 2018	U13.13007	1.27
While Nicky recovers in the hospital, J receives a visit from Paul, who orders J to cut off all contact with Nicky. Pope follows a lead on Baz's killer with Lucy and Marco, leading to the revelation that Smurf may have had Baz killed. Deran's date with Linc turns awkward after Adrian unexpectedly returns, leading Deran to visit Adrian and make out with him. Pearce pressures Smurf to turn on her sons, even purposely transferring Alvarez as Smurf's new cellmate. Although Smurf initially agrees to a deal, she goes back on it after realizing that Pearce is desperate and bluffing about the witness, as he had offered her a great deal too easily. The DA is forced to drop the charges due to lack of evidence, and Smurf gets released from jail.
31	8	"Incoming"	David Rodriguez	Daniele Nathanson	July 17, 2018	U13.13008	1.35
After being released from jail, Smurf discovers from Detective Pearce that the boys have been laundering money through her properties. Frankie and Billy help the Cody boys rob $790,000 being transported by plane. During the heist, Pope grows fed up with Billy, and J and Deran miss the drop-off point. They end up convincing a neighbor to drive them to the designated spot. Following the heist, the boys are surprised to find a subdued Smurf at home; they are ambivalent about her return. Billy catches up with Deran at the bar. Deran questions why Billy left him as a child; Billy claims that he wanted to raise Deran in Reno, but Smurf forced him to leave.
32	9	"Libertad"	Nick Copus	Bradley Paul	July 24, 2018	U13.13009	1.33
Smurf calls a family meeting, and demands that the boys get back the money Baz stole from her, which she believes Lucy took. She revokes J's power of attorney and insists the boys give her a twenty percent cut to launder money through her properties; she also organizes a proper memorial for Baz. Smurf visits Deran, who agrees to come to her memorial for Baz, and she has sex with Billy. When Deran's acquaintance Ox gets shot, Craig calls Linc to save Ox; Linc is unimpressed by Deran's criminal life and ends their relationship. Pope is forced to say goodbye to Lena when DCFS unexpectedly removes her from his care. Smurf gives money to Pete and asks him to make a trip to Mexico.
33	10	"Off the Tit"	Larry Teng	Addison McQuigg	July 31, 2018	U13.13010	1.31
Pope desperately visits DCFS, in hopes for information on Lena's transfer. J makes plans to launder money through different properties behind Smurf's back. Craig tries to apologize to Linc. Renn reveals that she is pregnant, though she insists Craig is not the father. Billy demands his cut from their plane heist, and when he does not get it, he threatens J and fights with Pope. Billy ultimately steals from Deran’s bar safe and flees. Following Billy's departure, Deran goes to Smurf for emotional support. Under Smurf's orders, Pete abducts Marco and ties him up in a warehouse. Smurf and Pete's crew brutally torture Marco to find out where her stolen money is.
34	11	"Jackpot"	Shawn Hatosy	Matt Kester	August 7, 2018 (Note: This episode premiered at Oceanside International Film Festival one week earlier.)	U13.13011	1.44
Smurf coerces the boys to be with her when she meets with Lucy to exchange Marco for her stolen money. In the process, she reveals her association with Pete's gang, to the boys' dismay. Lucy returns Smurf's money, minus what Baz had already given to the boys. However, a furious Marco starts a firefight that leaves him fatally wounded and Pope captured by Lucy. Following Marco's death, Lucy confesses to Pope that she did steal Smurf's money and lied about it, but continues to insist that she loved Baz, and that Smurf was behind his murder. As a condition of having Pope returned, Smurf admits to Lucy that she had Baz killed. Lucy calls a truce and Smurf retrieves Pope, who tells her that he now knows she ordered the hit on Baz.
35	12	"Homecoming"	David Rodriguez	Eliza Clark	August 14, 2018	U13.13012	1.37
Pope plans to kill Smurf, but is thwarted when she announces that Lena is coming home under her guardianship. Frankie takes Craig to a potential job at the luxurious house of a surf-gear entrepreneur. J sets Mia up in the condo he purchased for himself with Smurf's money. Smurf confronts her lawyer, Morgan, about secretly selling off one of her properties. Stunned, Morgan implicates J. Later, J approaches Morgan while she is swimming in the ocean. He kidnaps Morgan and leaves her for dead, her leg cut, 10 miles out to sea. Pope reunites with Lena but discovers she is unhappy. Realizing Lena is better off without him, Pope returns Lena to her foster family, telling Smurf that she will allow them to adopt Lena in exchange for his silence regarding her role in Baz's death. She agrees, if he will move back in.
36	13	"The Hyenas"	Chris Chulack	John Wells	August 21, 2018	U13.13013	1.37
Craig pulls the house burglary job with Frankie. Smurf and Pope investigate Morgan's theft of Smurf's properties and begin to suspect that J is involved. J destroys evidence linking him to the thefts. Morgan's dead body is washed up on shore. Pope has a breakdown, and he visits Amy's house for comfort. Under Smurf's orders, Pete takes Mia down to Mexico, where she murders Lucy by shooting her in the head in front of her son. Mia's abusive ex-boyfriend, Tupi, is released from jail. Deran plans to buy a house and have Adrian move in, but Adrian, who is smuggling drugs for a friend, is stopped by airport police on his way to a surf competition. Smurf divides ownership of all of her properties among the boys. J promises a sleeping Smurf that he will take everything from her.

=== Season 4 (2019) ===
No. overall	No. in season	Title	Directed by	Written by	Original release date	Prod. code	U.S. viewers (millions)
37	1	"Janine"	John Wells	Eliza Clark	May 28, 2019	U13.13601	1.35
Flashbacks depict a young Smurf in 1977 robbing banks with her boyfriend Jake and his gang. The bank heist goes bad when someone pulls out a gun, but Smurf warns them, and the gunman is shot by another gang member. The gang, led by Colin, argues over Smurf being part of the gang because she is female and her long hair stands out; Smurf overhears this and cuts her hair short. In the present, Adrian is now living with Deran, and following his arrest for drug smuggling, has made a deal with the DEA to help them catch the man who hired him. J is attending college classes. While the boys plan to rob a diner, Craig worries about Pope's reckless behavior. When the robbery goes wrong, Pope attempts to commit suicide by cop before Craig stops him.
38	2	"Angela"	John Wells	Daniele Nathanson	June 4, 2019	U13.13602	1.10
Flashbacks continue in 1977; following a heist, Smurf and Colin end up having sex. In the present, Craig suspects that Pope is suicidal. Adrian continues to meet with his DEA contact and is forced to identify Deran. Mia and Tupi conspire to rob J. Craig plots a museum heist with Frankie. J is approached by a detective investigating Morgan's murder. Smurf manages to get Morgan's death ruled an accident and confronts J about his actions. It is revealed that the detective was an old friend of Smurf whom she hired to determine whether J was responsible for Morgan's death. Angela, an old friend of Pope and Julia, returns to the Cody house, despite Smurf's orders to leave. Throughout the episode, Smurf displays increasing signs of illness and ultimately collapses.
39	3	"Man Vs. Rock"	Solvan Naim	Bradley Paul	June 11, 2019	U13.13603	1.18
In flashbacks, Smurf becomes more involved with Colin's gang. Pope deals with the return of Angela and is reluctantly given a job by Deran at the bar. Craig helps Frankie prepare for the new job. J is horrified when he witnesses Mia murder one of Tupi's friends. Later, upon seeing Angela at the house, J confronts Pope. J reveals that Angela used to make him shoot her up, and that after Angela disappeared with Julia's drugs, Julia ended up in the hospital due to bad drugs J had gotten in an effort to make her better. Smurf undergoes medical tests and learns that she has developed skin cancer, which has spread to other parts of her body.
40	4	"Tank"	Megan Griffiths	Addison McQuigg	June 18, 2019	U13.13604	1.19
Flashbacks depict Smurf and Colin discussing their upbringings; Colin relates his time in the war, and Smurf reveals that Miriam worked as a prostitute. Later, Smurf chastises the gang for mocking Colin's PTSD. In the present, Mia and Tupi vandalize J's apartment when J kicks her out. Colby, a member of Deran's old crew, informs Deran about Ox's death. Colby also reveals that Adrian is working with Jack. Angela confronts Smurf over "what you did to Julia." Despite J's concerns, the boys proceed with Craig and Frankie's museum heist. They are successful, but Frankie does not have the money upfront. Craig receives an unexpected visit from a pregnant Renn. Pope and Angela discover Smurf, bleeding and passed out in the bathroom.
41	5	"Reap"	Cherie Nowlan	Matt Kester	June 25, 2019	U13.13605	1.01
In flashbacks, Smurf and Colin grow closer as the gang grows angrier with Smurf, who wants to be a part of the gang. In the present, Pope discovers Smurf's cancer diagnosis; Smurf instructs him to keep it a secret from his brothers. Pope and Angela kiss. J confronts Mia, who blackmails him over his secret side jobs. Tupi later starts a fight with J, but J gets the upper hand, spurring Tupi to run away. J has sex with his classmate Olivia. After being shorted by Frankie, the boys end up robbing Frankie's associate Rahul. Frankie arrives at the Cody house to give Smurf a cut of the job; Smurf later reprimands the boys for planning jobs with outsiders. Tensions rise between Deran and Adrian, who gets interrogated by Detective Pearce.
42	6	"Into the Black"	Loren Yaconelli	Bill Balas	July 2, 2019	U13.13606	1.12
Flashbacks depict Smurf and the gang robbing a commune; the leader is revealed to be someone who sexually abused Smurf as a child. In the present, Detective Pearce pressures Adrian to help take down the Cody family. Smurf undergoes cancer treatment and learns that someone close to the family is talking to the cops. Smurf instructs J to find out who it is; J instead follows Smurf to her medical treatment and learns of her cancer. Pope and Angela continue their relationship. Craig confronts Frankie and discovers she was trying to use him to get close to Smurf. After the DEA takes down Jack, Colby attempts to blackmail Deran for $20,000. Instead, Deran kills Colby and places the blame for talking to the cops on him.
43	7	"Know Thy Enemy"	Laura Belsey	Vanessa Baden Kelly	July 9, 2019	U13.13607	1.15
In flashbacks, it is implied that Smurf has become pregnant. Pope struggles to deal with Smurf's cancer, while Angela refuses Smurf's attempts to bribe her to leave. A pregnant Renn continues to live with Craig, but she unexpectedly takes off. J begins plotting a new job involving Olivia's family. Smurf continues searching for the person speaking to the cops and secretly buys a bag of high-powered weapons before stealing a car and taking off. Guilt-stricken, Adrian admits the truth to Deran and declines working with Pearce, even if it means going to jail. Adrian ultimately decides to move out rather than continue to put Deran at risk. Having never taken a life before, Deran is filled with guilt over killing Colby to protect Adrian. Despite Adrian's lies, Deran decides to work things out with him while keeping Adrian's actions a secret from everyone else.
44	8	"Ambo"	David Rodriguez	Bradley Paul	July 16, 2019	U13.13608	1.29
Flashbacks continue to depict a young Smurf, who has begun to take a commanding role in the gang and is revealed to have aided in ripping off the gang. In the present, the boys pull the job J set up, but are subsequently robbed by Mia and Tupi. J informs Pete of their activities, and Pete kills Tupi after discovering he is wearing one of the stolen chains from J's job. Mia pushes J to continue their partnership and confesses to murdering Baz for Smurf. Instead, J kills Mia, recovers the stolen items, and reveals Smurf's cancer to Pete, telling Pete that he will now be dealing with him instead of Smurf.
45	9	"SHTF"	Janice Cook	Eliza Clark	July 23, 2019	U13.13609	1.13
Flashbacks depict Smurf visiting Colin's family. Following the visit, Smurf reveals her pregnancy to Colin. In the present, Smurf visits Colin's brother Jed to buy more guns. Pope tells Deran and Craig about Smurf's cancer and visits Lena. J deals with the aftermath of his dealings with Mia and purposefully tempts Angela to go back on drugs. Deran enlists Craig's help to ambush Agent Livengood, hoping to force Livengood to change his mind about Adrian, but Craig refuses when he realizes that Livengood is a cop. Pearce later visits Deran and offers to help with Adrian if Deran will talk to Pearce about the family. Renn gives birth and admits she thinks her son is Craig's. Smurf returns and reveals that she has a big job for the family, one on which she will be joining them.
46	10	"Exit Strategy"	Nick Copus	Matt Kester	July 30, 2019	U13.13610	1.13
In flashbacks, Colin informs Manny about Smurf's pregnancy. Manny suggests that they ditch Smurf, but Colin decides against doing so. In the present, Smurf orchestrates an elaborate party at the house and also announces their next job: raiding Jed's bunker. Olivia tries to blackmail J, having learned of the Codys' history. Craig gets confronted by Renn's mother, who wants Renn's baby to live with her; Craig refuses. Renn names her baby son Nick. Pope learns that Angela has relapsed. At Smurf's party, he locks Angela in the bathroom to detox. Adrian reveals that he is potentially facing fifteen years in prison. Smurf informs Deran that she knows that Adrian is talking to the cops. She warns him: “Handle it, or I'll have to turn it over to Pope.”
47	11	"Julia"	Shawn Hatosy	Daniele Nathanson	August 6, 2019	U13.13611	1.20
In flashbacks, a heavily pregnant Smurf plans for her new life with Colin. However, her plans are destroyed when Colin is killed in a shootout with the police. Following Angela's drug binge, Pope attempts to get her sober again and gets a stark look at her original intentions for him; Angela had only shown up at the Cody house to get money from Smurf. Angela's confession forces Pope to face his guilt over his distance from Julia. After learning of J's role in Angela's relapse, Pope states that once Smurf is gone, J will be too. Craig tries to build a family with Renn. Deran makes plans to flee the country with Adrian after being ordered by Smurf to kill him. J is approached by Frankie for help with pulling off a new job.
48	12	"Ghosts"	John Wells	John Wells	August 13, 2019	U13.13612	1.42
Flashbacks depict Smurf going into labor after Jed tries to rape her; she gives birth to Julia and Pope. In the present, Smurf leads the robbery of Jed's gold stash while Angela enjoys having the house to herself. Smurf kills Jed and instigates a gunfight with his sons, nearly getting her and Pope killed. After being rescued by Pope, a deranged Smurf reveals that she had intended it to be a suicide mission, wanting to die rather than wasting away from cancer. Smurf tries to force Pope to shoot her. Instead, J shoots Smurf in the head, killing her instantly. Following Smurf's death, Deran makes plans to leave the country for good with Adrian, while J expresses concerns about Pope's truck, which Pope had left behind during the escape.
49	13	"Smurf"	David Rodriguez	Eliza Clark	August 20, 2019	U13.13613	1.39
In flashbacks, Smurf escapes from Jed and seeks the help of a friend, Pamela, before returning to Jake. In the present, J learns that Smurf left a minimal amount of money to her family; the rest, including the house, goes to Pamela. With the help of Frankie, J identifies Pamela and learns that Smurf may have done a string of armed robberies with her in the 80s that Smurf was never caught in. With Smurf dead, her friends and enemies come out of the woodwork, including Billy and Jake. Craig meets Jake for the first time, unaware that Jake is his father. Smurf's fence refuses to do business with J. Deran decides to remain behind in Oceanside, breaking up with Adrian for Adrian's safety. After being kicked out by Pope, J meets with him and reveals his lies and Smurf's will, offering Pope his help in exchange for them running the family together. Pope accepts. To prove that they are still in business, the family publicly assault Angela's brother, who is threatening her life after she snitched on him to get a lesser prison sentence.

=== Season 5 (2021) ===
No. overall	No. in season	Title	Directed by	Written by	Original release date	Prod. code	U.S. viewers (millions)
50	1	"Red Handed"	Nick Copus	Daniele Nathanson	July 11, 2021	U13.14201	0.76
Periodic flashbacks, now in 1984, depict Smurf leading a transitory lifestyle, and using Julia and Pope as pickpockets and shoplifters. The flashbacks also depict Pope's early issues with violence and unusual behavior as well as Julia's questioning of Smurf's motives. In the present, J hands out copies of Smurf's will to Deran and Craig, who learn they are left with nothing. The Codys circle the wagons as they learn Jed's sons, a group of doomsday preppers, have tracked the truck to Oceanside. A tense standoff leads to an agreement that the gold should be returned in order to put Smurf's vendetta to rest. However, the truce does not hold; the preppers attack the house and all but one, Mike, are killed by the Codys. In the hills, Pope forces Mike to dig a grave, struggling with the decision of whether or not to execute him; he ultimately decides to let Mike go, refusing to do what Smurf would want.
51	2	"What Remains"	Mark Strand	Bill Balas	July 18, 2021	U13.14202	1.17
In flashbacks, Pamela advises Smurf to make serious plans for the future and give up her reckless ways. At a party, Smurf gets into a heated confrontation with a drug dealer which is deescalated by Pam. In the present, the Codys find out that Smurf's entire estate, including their home, will be transferred to Pam in six months time. Looking for ways to keep the family business afloat, J convinces Frankie to give him access to a fence. Pope starts to unravel after finding out Angela has not reported to her parole officer in weeks. Deran reflects on his regrets for not leaving the country with Adrian and ends up burning clothes and pictures of them in a rage. Adrian's DEA handler, believing that Deran had murdered Adrian, warns that he will be coming after the Codys as a result. J is approached by Pete, who provides him with a lead for a job; the location of a crashed cargo plane filled with drugs and money. J tells Deran and Craig about the job; they agree, on the condition that Pope is included.
52	3	"Freeride"	John Wells	Bradley Paul	July 25, 2021	U13.14203	0.99
In 1984, Smurf reconnects with Manny and Jake for the first time since Colin's death, convincing them to assist her in robbing the drug dealer that Pam had introduced her to. Pam is furious and kicks Smurf out; with nowhere else to go, Smurf makes her way to Oceanside. In the present, Deran finds himself involved with a couple where he exhibits aggressive behavior similar to his treatment of Adrian. Craig attempts to convince Renn to stop dealing drugs out of their house. Pope continues to worry those around him in his disoriented state. The plane job does not go as planned when no cash is found, and the Codys must evade armed pursuers after fleeing with a large amount of cocaine. Deran and Craig storm out of the house after learning J had already made a deal to have Pete move the drugs and had set up his own businesses with money stolen from Smurf.
53	4	"Power"	Batan Silva	Shukree Hassan Tilghman	August 1, 2021	U13.14204	1.00
In 1984, Smurf is now living with Jake, Manny, Julia and Pope in a trailer park in Oceanside. After a successful smash-and-grab, the group decide to stay in town and explore other opportunities. In the present, a schism develops between the Codys in the aftermath of the plane job; Deran tries to assert himself as leader of the family over J, demanding complete access to J's businesses and assets. Deran also tries to shut J out from dealing with Pete, leading J to offload the drugs. Craig implores Frankie to stop dealing with J. Pope is arrested and admitted to the hospital after being found wandering in a fugue state. Pope angrily recounts J's shooting of Smurf, lamenting it as something that should not have happened. Deran confronts Pam, who hints at an opportunity for future jobs in exchange for parts of the estate. Adrian's DEA handler presses Deran to make a deal, suggesting that Adrian will eventually get bored, return from Southeast Asia and be arrested otherwise.
54	5	"Family Business"	Janice Cooke	Vanessa Baden Kelly	August 8, 2021	U13.14205	0.95
In 1984, Smurf successfully pulls off an elaborate scheme to get an Oceanside police officer on her payroll for use in future jobs. In the present, Pam and her family meets with the Codys, providing them with a job; Phoenix, Pam's son, reveals that the job is to retrieve evidence of his involvement in an accidental death. They give the Codys an ultimatum - accept the job or move out by the end of the week. Deran and J accept the job, in which they will be taking a safe from the office of a busy skateboard company. Craig meets with Frankie and learns that she has lost business contacts and is in debt. Pope becomes undone after learning that Angela had been beaten to death by an addict in a local drug house; Pope viciously beats the addict under the Oceanside Pier. Later at the house, Pope breaks down, confiding to Deran about his ongoing blackouts and hallucinations; Deran agrees the best decision would be for him to leave town for a while.
55	6	"Home Sweet Home"	Nick Copus	Matt Kester	August 15, 2021	U13.14206	0.89
In flashbacks, Jake is severely beaten in front of Pope and Julia by a man named Max Cross, an Oceanside underworld figure who considers their recent jobs an infringement on his territory. Smurf makes a deal with Max in exchange for him keeping away from the family. In the present, the safe job goes horribly awry, as none of the information Phoenix provided turns out to be correct. J and Deran narrowly escape from a window with the safe while Renn, who was brought in to act as a distraction, is forced to stab someone in order to get away after her cover is blown. Craig, Deran and J agree to hold onto the safe until Pam formally signs the house over to them. Pope runs away and finds himself at a roadside commune; he meets a mysterious woman named Cassandra, who convinces him to ingest a drink laced with drugs. Pope and Cassandra leave the commune and wander further off into the desert in a stupor.
56	7	"Splinter"	Nick Copus	Carla Frankenbach	August 22, 2021	U13.14207	0.93
In flashbacks, Smurf strikes up a relationship with Billy, leaving Pope and Julia home alone. Smurf returns and discovers Pam waiting with them; Pam states that despite her and Smurf's disagreements, she will always be there for her when needed. In the present, Pope continues to travel with Cassandra and finds out she is a divorcee. J meets with Lark, Pam's granddaughter, who signs the house back over to the Codys. Craig celebrates with a wild party at the house, in which he throws all of Deran's belongings into the pool. Renn finds out that Craig wanted her nowhere near the job; out of spite, Renn attempts to buy coke from her supplier. Deran deals with his struggling bar, finding out the downturn is due to rumors that the Codys had Adrian murdered. J discovers that Pete had been approached by Adrian's DEA handler; Pete tells J the only information the agent was looking for was on Deran.
57	8	"Gladiators"	Nick Copus	Heath Corson	August 29, 2021	U13.14208	0.83
In 1984, Smurf and Pam's bond grows noticeably stronger after a successful jewelry store heist. In the present, Pope kidnaps Cassandra's son from her ex-husband to return him to her. Craig learns from J that none of the Codys will benefit from the plane job and, desperate for cash, goes on a coke binge and robs several liquor stores. J meets with Lark and asks about the possibility of selling parts of Smurf's estate if the Codys decide to go their separate ways. Deran confronts Pete over his dumping of the drugs; Pete states that he will no longer do business with the Codys. Craig, Deran and J fight over who is to blame for their current situation; J blames Deran for not being strong enough to kill Adrian. Pope returns home and finds J packing his bags; Pope convinces J to stay and, despite threatening to find him should he leave, there is a tenuous respect between the two.
58	9	"Let It Ride"	Loren Yaconelli	Bill Balas	September 5, 2021	U13.14209	0.94
In 1984, Manny fails to show up for a job after he is beaten over mounting gambling debts and Smurf strikes up a partnership after paying off his loan shark, Pete Trujillo Sr. and the young Pete. In the present, the Codys attend a local skate competition, where Deran runs into the owner of a new local bar that has been contributing to his lack of business. J approaches Lark for a lead on an attorney who can help them simplify the money laundering process that Smurf set up with their properties. Having returned home, Pope gets rid of anything that reminds him of Smurf. J's new contact in the Oceanside police gives him access to files regarding the Codys, though none of them state how much information the DEA has on Deran. Deran advises Adrian's sister to stop sending Adrian money. Craig fights with Renn over her continued dealing, causing her to leave with their son. At the bar, Craig bribes a local food vendor to come to Deran's instead; the rival bar owner arrives and starts a fight with Craig and Deran.
59	10	"Relentless"	Loren Yaconelli	Bradley Paul	September 12, 2021	U13.14210	0.88
Smurf runs afoul of Max once again, who is unhappy that Smurf is doing jobs outside his territory. Max approaches Pope and Julia and threatens to take them away if Smurf does not pay what is owed; Smurf learns of this and assures both kids that he will never bother them again. In the present, Deran's bar gets shut down by the liquor board; Deran initially believes it is due to the fight, but later finds out it was ordered by Agent Livengood. J scopes out a potential robbery of a local "hawala". Disappointed to find out the small amounts handled, J implores Craig to contact Frankie for a lead on one operating on a larger scale. Pope learns that Pete has forbidden anyone from dealing with the Codys. Officer Chadwick, J's contact in the Oceanside police, sets up a meeting with the Codys to discuss options for dealing with the DEA. They meet at Deran's bar and are surprised to see Livengood arrive with the officer. After vowing to destroy the family using every resource he can, Livengood is suddenly shot dead by Chadwick; Chadwick assures the shocked Codys that the killing will not be traced to them, but he expects to be well compensated for his services in the future.
60	11	"Trust the Process"	Shawn Hatosy	Shukree Hassan Tilghman	September 19, 2021	U13.14211	0.85
In 1984, Smurf's attempt to lure Max into a trap through a local contact (Baz's mother, a local stripper) is unsuccessful. Smurf is violently confronted by Max, but Pope saves her by stabbing Max in the leg; Pope then witnesses Smurf kill Max. In the present, the Codys deal with Livengood's death; J and Pope pay smugglers to stage the death as a cartel hit. Deran and Craig meet with Frankie to discuss scoping out a job. Frankie meets with a higher-level hawala, a longshoreman operating out of a union hall, using a GPS to track where the money is being stored. Initially believing it to be in the hall, the Codys discover the tracker has entered a large port, where security will be air-tight. Pope and Craig comment on the impossibility of the job, but Deran states, with proper planning, there is a good chance they will be successful.
61	12	"Loose Ends"	Nick Copus	Matt Kester	September 26, 2021	U13.14212	0.75
In 1984, the crew decides to rob Max's safe that contains cash, guns and a sizeable list of his underworld contacts which, much to Jake and Manny's chagrin, Smurf plans to use to build her own network. In the present, the Codys prepare to move on the port, though it shapes up to be difficult when Deran and J are unable to come up with a clear plan of action after scoping it out. Craig's drug abuse worsens, leading both Frankie and Pope to confront him over his reckless behavior and the risk it will pose on the job. FBI agents show up at the bar and question Deran about his association with Livengood, but they do not seem to suspect his involvement. J and Pope decide to cut ties with Chadwick. Pope finds out that Pete is moving the coke from the plane job, despite telling the Codys it was disposed of. When back at the house, Pope praises J for the way he has stepped up since Smurf's death and informs him of the situation with Pete.
62	13	"Launch"	Nick Copus	Daniele Nathanson	October 3, 2021	U13.14213	0.68
In 1984, Smurf begins making plans to move into the Cody family home, and she reveals to Julia and Pope that she is pregnant. In the present, the Codys rob the port, but they are discovered and forced to flee both the man they are robbing and the police; however, the heist is ultimately successful. After getting her cut of the money, Frankie leaves the country. Renn continues to ignore Craig while living with her cousins; she attempts to send a friend to collect both her and Nick's things, but Craig refuses. Enraged at Pete's lies about the cocaine, Pope and J confront Pete; Pope rips one of Pete's eyes out as a punishment and threatens to do worse if he does not give them their cut. The Codys share a family dinner where J and Deran, finally working together as the leaders of the family, outline their plan to sell off Smurf's apartment buildings and buy a series of businesses to launder money through. To everyone's surprise, Deran decides to start laundering money through his bar, which had previously been just his legitimate side business. As they celebrate, the police discover Catherine's body buried at a new housing development.

=== Season 6 (2022) ===
No. overall	No. in season	Title	Directed by	Written by	Original release date	Prod. code	U.S. viewers (millions)
63	1	"1992"	Nick Copus	Daniele Nathanson	June 19, 2022	U13.14551	0.47
In 1992, Pope, Julia and Baz steal computers from their high school, but are caught by faculty. Following a meeting with the vice-principal and Smurf, recommendations are made for the twins: Pope is expelled and advised to transfer to an alternative school, whereas Julia is given the option to stay. Smurf later lies to Julia, telling her she was also expelled. In the present day, Smurf's former fence Gia seeks the Codys' help to complete a job against a rival seller. The Codys instead burn Gia's store down as retribution for refusing to fence for them after Smurf's death. Craig, newly sober, is able to occasionally see his son under Renn's conditions, while Deran feels the weight of Smurf's past presence in the community as disruptive out-of-towners descend upon Oceanside. J gets intimate with Lark, Pamela's granddaughter and family lawyer.
64	2	"Rise"	Nick Copus	Matt Kester	June 19, 2022	U13.14552	0.36
In 1992, Smurf and a teenage Pope meet with a lawyer to deal with assault charges against him; Smurf rejects the lawyer's suggestion that Pope visit a psychiatrist and instead pays her off to assure that Pope avoids juvie. Julia consoles Pope and warns him about Smurf's manipulation, after which Pope burns his skateboard. In the present, J calls a family meeting to search for a new attorney for the crew and ends up bonding with Penny, a married lawyer whose husband is away on active military duty. Pope digs in and refuses to sell a vacant lot he owns, instead deciding to build a skate park in the lot. Deran leans into his growing influence and status within the family business. Craig struggles to stay sober and asks to swap houses with Deran, who declines; Craig also bonds with a bike mechanic named Vince, who offers to become Craig's sponsor.
65	3	"Pressure and Time"	Shawn Hatosy	Bradley Paul	June 26, 2022	U13.14553	0.68
In 1992, Julia takes a job at the mall, a decision that irritates Smurf; Julia is ultimately convinced to quit her job when Smurf offers her a stolen car. Smurf also expresses disapproval when Pope becomes more involved with church. In the present, J tries to offload blue diamonds that came from Gia's job to high-end jeweler Eddie Pham and is initially lowballed. J later proposes to his uncles that they rob Eddie's building for their next job. Deran and Pope search for Craig, who breaks his sobriety after a confrontation with Renn; Craig's absence forces Deran and J to confront how unreliable he's become. Elsewhere, Detective Louise Thompson begins an investigation into Catherine's murder and interviews Lena, who recalls that Pope visited Catherine on the day that she died.
66	4	"Inside Man"	Amyn Kaderali	Vanessa Baden Kelly	June 26, 2022	U13.14554	0.53
In 1992, Pope continues to spend time at church and joins a bible study group. Baz visits the church and scopes it out, after which Smurf announces to the family that they will rob the church for their next job, infuriating Pope and Julia. In the present, Craig scopes out Eddie's building, while J tries to convince Eddie's brother Arthur to assist them as an insider for their upcoming job; Arthur ultimately agrees to help the Codys when J offers a 25% cut. J continues to bond with Penny, and the two go on a date. Deran hangs out with an out-of-town contact and expresses suspicion over Craig and Vince's friendship. Pope offers a job to a homeless young man named Taylor at the skate park; Taylor is later revealed to be working as a reluctant informant for Detective Thompson.
67	5	"Covet"	Aric Avelino	Carla Frankenbach	July 3, 2022	U13.14555	0.68
In 1992, Baz, Julia and a reluctant Pope are pulled into performing the church job for Smurf. When Smurf expresses interest in pawning an ancient Bible, Pope decides to return the Bible to the church but is caught by Father Kirby; Pope tearfully beats the priest and storms out. In the present, the Codys prepare for their next big job; J pushes for more control over the planning, side-lining Deran's input, and Craig tries to stay clean but is tempted by old contacts and environments. Detective Thompson visits an imprisoned Vin, who states that Pope told the other inmates that Catherine was his wife. When Taylor gets injured at the skate park, Pope visits Taylor at the hospital and has a chance encounter with Amy. J and Penny begin a sexual affair.
68	6	"Diamonds Are Forever"	Mark Strand	Shukree Hassan Tilghman	July 10, 2022	U13.14556	0.69
In 1992, teenage Julia and Baz grow closer and end up having sex, angering Smurf and further isolating Pope. In the present, the Codys pull off a staged jewel robbery as their next job, while Detective Thompson breaks into the Cody house and turns off the circuit breaker to search for any evidence. J secretly skims profits from the heist, deepening his betrayal of the family, while Craig and Deran clash and get into a physical altercation over the job and its aftermath. Following the heist, Pope leaves Amy a voicemail to reconnect.
69	7	"Incognito"	Nick Copus	Heath Corson	July 17, 2022	U13.14557	0.68
When Nick is kidnapped by a rival drug dealer, Craig desperately turns to Deran for help. The two brothers work together to track Nick down, eventually abducting one of the rival dealers and using him to locate the people holding Nick. They raid a heavily fortified drug operation, with Deran taking several bullets to his bulletproof vest during the rescue. They get Nick back safely, repairing the relationship between the two brothers. Meanwhile, J continues pursuing Penny, while Pope agrees to J's idea of turning the skate park into a non-profit to launder money. Pope and Amy reconnect over dinner, after which they are confronted by Detective Thompson, who introduces herself as Taylor's mother. Pope begins to suspect that somebody broke into the Cody house after noticing a misplaced cereal box.
70	8	"Revelation"	Ryan Zaragoza	Bradley Paul	July 24, 2022	U13.14558	0.77
In 1992, Smurf arranges for Pope to discover the truth about Julia and Baz's relationship, which causes him to storm off in distress. Later, Smurf accuses Julia of "ruining" the family by pursuing Baz, while Baz implies to Smurf that he may move out of the Cody house. In the present, J and Deran consider doing a smaller independent robbery, while Craig, Renn and Nick spend time together as a family, with Craig increasingly confronted by the possibility that Renn wants to take Nick and leave. After being threatened by Pope, Taylor admits that his "mother" is actually Detective Thompson. Pope follows Thompson to her motel room and directly confronts her, believing that she is looking for a payout; Thompson is undeterred and faces off against Pope, revealing her investigation into Catherine's murder. Afterwards, Pope returns to the Cody house and reveals to a stunned J and Deran that he killed Catherine, and that Thompson is tailing him.
71	9	"Gethsemane"	Ramaa Mosley	Vanessa Baden Kelly & Carla Frankenbach	July 31, 2022	U13.14559	0.66
In 1992, Julia attempts to make amends with an upset Pope, while Smurf offers Baz his own place in order to keep him away from Julia. Later, Smurf hires sex workers to arrive at the house and bond with Pope, much to Julia's disgust. In the present, Pope explains the details of Catherine's murder to J, Deran and Craig, including how Smurf manipulated him into performing the act. The Codys hire a lawyer to represent Pope. Meanwhile, Renn expresses interest in leaving Oceanside to start anew, but Craig is reluctant. Penny calls J when her sister overdoses. Pope is formally arrested and brought in for intense questioning by authorities about past crimes; Thompson reveals that she learned that Pope murdered Catherine through Amy, and threatens to charge her as an accessory to murder. Thompson also reveals that if the case goes to trial, Lena will have to view the crime scene photographs of Catherine's corpse. In order to prevent Amy and Lena from being dragged into a trial, Pope makes a full confession to Catherine's murder.
72	10	"Clink"	Shaz Bennett	Shukree Hassan Tilghman	August 7, 2022	U13.14560	0.76
In 1992, Julia and Pope work together on one of Smurf's jobs, and Julia is seen taking a cut of Smurf's money for herself. In the present, Pope is now in prison and begins to deteriorate psychologically. The Codys pay a prison contact to protect him, but Pope refuses protection and actively isolates himself. He is eventually stabbed in the stomach by a member of a gang connected to the Trujillo's. Pope retaliates violently and deliberately gets himself put into solitary confinement after drugs are found in his possession. Deran visits him and tries to persuade him to fight the charges; Pope refuses and makes it clear that Lena and Amy are not to be harmed. Meanwhile, J becomes convinced that Pope is too dangerous to leave alive and considers paying the prison contact to have Pope killed rather than protected. Craig and Deran, however, reject that idea and decide that they need to break Pope out of prison.
73	11	"Hit and Run"	Sherwin Shilati	Matt Kester	August 14, 2022	U13.14561	0.74
In 1992, Julia considers going to college and is chastised by Pope for stealing from Smurf. When Julia discovers that Baz is cheating on her, Pope comforts Julia and tries to kiss her; Julia immediately lambasts him. In the present, Pope remains in solitary and becomes increasingly detached from reality, beginning to experience visions of Baz. Baz talks to Pope about Catherine and helps him confront the fact that his obsession with Catherine, and ultimately her murder, was heavily shaped by Smurf’s manipulation. Meanwhile, Craig, Deran and J work on a plan to get Pope out of prison and divide up the Cody assets so that they can disappear afterwards. Billy reappears and offers to help with the prison connection, although Deran ultimately wants to handle things himself. Flashbacks to 2013 reveal what happened three years before the events of season one; Pope and Baz were preparing to rob a bank, but Baz was already looking after himself rather than Pope. During the robbery, Baz escapes while Pope is left behind when the police arrive. Pope runs from the scene, throws away his gun and is eventually caught.
74	12	"Exodus"	Nick Copus	Bradley Paul	August 21, 2022	U13.14562	0.79
In 1992, Smurf discovers that Julia has been stealing from her and confronts her daughter, effectively telling Julia that she can have her freedom but only on Smurf's terms. The confrontation becomes physical and extremely ugly, with Smurf dragging Julia out of the house while Pope watches. Julia visits Baz, but he refuses to take her in under Smurf's orders. In the present, Pope decides that he needs to get out of prison and offers prosecutors information about an old murder/cold case in exchange for a prison transfer and greater protection. He takes them to the location where a body is buried, allowing the authorities to recover it. The Cody brothers finally accept that their criminal empire is collapsing. Deran closes and says goodbye to his bar, while the brothers begin liquidating their assets and preparing to leave Oceanside. Craig has to choose between staying with the family and leaving with Renn and Nick, and he ultimately decides that Renn and his son are his priority. J is making plans with Penny, but he is also clearly continuing to think several moves ahead and isn't as emotionally invested in the relationship as Penny believes.
75	13	"Fubar"	John Wells	Daniele Nathanson	August 28, 2022	U13.14563	0.90
In flashbacks, a heavily pregnant and strung out Julia breaks into the house and is caught by Pope; she admits that while the baby's father could be Baz, she does not know for sure. Smurf agrees to take Julia to rehab; while driving to rehab, Pope and Julia choose J's name together, and Pope promises to always be there for his nephew. Displeased at Julia's good influence over Pope, Smurf abandons her on the streets and forces Pope to choose between her and Julia; Pope reluctantly chooses Smurf. In the present, Deran and Craig successfully break Pope out of a prison transport, but J betrays them, sabotaging their getaway vehicles and alerting the police to their plans. Cornered, Pope makes a last stand against the cops while Deran and Craig escape; although Pope wins, he is mortally wounded in the process. While robbing a convenience store, Craig is shot by the owner's young son and he later dies in Deran's arms. Deran promises Craig to look after Nick. After J uses her as an alibi, Penny becomes frightened and refuses to flee with J; knowing that she will call the cops, a remorseful J fatally poisons Penny. An enraged Pope catches J, who reveals that he blamed the Codys for the death of his mother because they abandoned her. After nearly drowning J, Pope allows him to escape. Pope then burns down the Cody house before finally dying of his wounds. Having destroyed his family and stolen all of their money, J makes it to the Virgin Islands where he sits poolside, now completely alone.

== Ratings ==
Animal Kingdom : U.S. viewers per episode (millions)

Season	Episode number													Average
Season	1	2	3	4	5	6	7	8	9	10	11	12	13	Average
1	1.31	1.10	1.18	1.18	1.39	1.25	1.22	1.23	1.32	1.51	–			1.27
2	1.19	1.05	0.96	1.13	1.17	1.17	1.27	1.10	1.21	1.20	1.16	1.22	1.41	1.17
3	1.61	1.22	1.16	1.33	1.31	1.20	1.27	1.35	1.33	1.31	1.44	1.37	1.37	1.31
4	1.35	1.10	1.18	1.19	1.01	1.12	1.15	1.29	1.13	1.13	1.20	1.42	1.39	1.21
5	0.76	1.17	0.99	1.00	0.95	0.89	0.93	0.83	0.94	0.88	0.85	0.75	0.68	0.94
6	0.47	0.36	0.68	0.53	0.68	0.69	0.68	0.77	0.66	0.76	0.74	0.79	0.90	0.67

Audience measurement performed by Nielsen Media Research (Note: The viewership statistics in the graph and table are sourced from the citations in the season-specific tables above.)

=== Season 1 ===
Viewership and ratings per episode of List of Animal Kingdom episodes
No.	Title	Air date	Rating (18–49)	Viewers (millions)	DVR (18–49)	DVR viewers (millions)	Total (18–49)	Total viewers (millions)
1	"Pilot"	June 14, 2016	0.4	1.31	—N/a	0.80	—N/a	2.11
2	"We Don't Hurt People"	June 14, 2016	0.4	1.10	—N/a	0.84	—N/a	1.94
3	"Stay Close, Stick Together"	June 21, 2016	0.4	1.18	—N/a	0.94	—N/a	2.12
4	"Dead to Me"	June 28, 2016	0.4	1.18	—N/a	—N/a	—N/a	—N/a
5	"Flesh Is Weak"	July 5, 2016	0.5	1.39	0.4	1.11	0.9	2.50
6	"Child Care"	July 12, 2016	0.4	1.25	0.4	1.23	0.8	2.48
7	"Goddamn Animals"	July 19, 2016	0.4	1.22	—N/a	—N/a	—N/a	—N/a
8	"Man In"	July 26, 2016	0.4	1.23	—N/a	1.06	—N/a	2.29 (Note: Live +7 ratings were not available, so Live +3 ratings have been used instead.)
9	"Judas Kiss"	August 2, 2016	0.4	1.32	0.3	—N/a	0.7	—N/a
10	"What Have You Done?"	August 9, 2016	0.5	1.51	0.4	1.42	0.9	2.93

=== Season 2 ===
Viewership and ratings per episode of List of Animal Kingdom episodes
No.	Title	Air date	Rating (18–49)	Viewers (millions)	DVR (18–49)	DVR viewers (millions)	Total (18–49)	Total viewers (millions)
1	"Eat What You Kill"	May 30, 2017	0.4	1.19	0.5	1.20	0.9	2.39
2	"Karma"	June 6, 2017	0.4	1.05	0.4	1.16	0.8	2.21
3	"Bleed for It"	June 13, 2017	0.3	0.96	0.5	1.29	0.8	2.25
4	"Broken Boards"	June 20, 2017	0.3	1.13	0.5	1.25	0.8	2.38
5	"Forgive Us Our Trespasses"	June 27, 2017	0.4	1.17	—N/a	—N/a	—N/a	—N/a
6	"Cry Havoc"	July 11, 2017	0.4	1.17	0.3	1.16	0.7	2.33
7	"Dig"	July 18, 2017	0.4	1.27	0.5	1.30	0.9	2.57
8	"Grace"	July 25, 2017	0.4	1.10	—N/a	—N/a	—N/a	—N/a
9	"Custody"	August 1, 2017	0.4	1.21	0.4	1.31	0.8	2.52
10	"Treasure"	August 8, 2017	0.4	1.20	0.5	1.21	0.8	2.42
11	"The Leopard"	August 15, 2017	0.4	1.16	0.4	1.33	0.8	2.48
12	"You Will Be Gutted"	August 22, 2017	0.4	1.22	0.4	1.32	0.8	2.54
13	"Betrayal"	August 29, 2017	0.4	1.41	0.5	1.31	0.9	2.71

=== Season 3 ===
Viewership and ratings per episode of List of Animal Kingdom episodes
No.	Title	Air date	Rating (18–49)	Viewers (millions)	DVR (18–49)	DVR viewers (millions)	Total (18–49)	Total viewers (millions)
1	"The Killing"	May 29, 2018	0.7	1.61	—N/a	—N/a	—N/a	—N/a
2	"In the Red"	June 5, 2018	0.4	1.22	0.3	1.05	0.7	2.27
3	"The Center Will Hold"	June 12, 2018	0.4	1.16	0.3	0.95	0.7	2.12
4	"Wolves"	June 19, 2018	0.4	1.33	0.4	1.16	0.8	2.49
5	"Prey"	June 26, 2018	0.4	1.31	0.3	0.96	0.7	2.28
6	"Broke From the Box"	July 3, 2018	0.4	1.20	0.3	1.06	0.7	2.26
7	"Low Man"	July 10, 2018	0.4	1.27	0.4	1.17	0.8	2.44
8	"Incoming"	July 17, 2018	0.4	1.35	0.3	1.28	0.7	2.63
9	"Libertad"	July 24, 2018	0.4	1.33	0.4	1.25	0.8	2.59
10	"Off the Tit"	July 31, 2018	0.4	1.31	0.3	0.92	0.7	2.24
11	"Jackpot"	August 7, 2018	0.4	1.44	0.3	0.92	0.7	2.37
12	"Homecoming"	August 14, 2018	0.4	1.37	0.4	1.21	0.8	2.58
13	"The Hyenas"	August 21, 2018	0.4	1.37	0.3	0.95	0.7	2.32

=== Season 4 ===
Viewership and ratings per episode of List of Animal Kingdom episodes
No.	Title	Air date	Rating (18–49)	Viewers (millions)	DVR (18–49)	DVR viewers (millions)	Total (18–49)	Total viewers (millions)
1	"Janine"	May 28, 2019	0.4	1.35	0.3	1.03	0.7	2.38
2	"Angela"	June 4, 2019	0.3	1.10	0.4	1.19	0.7	2.29
3	"Man Vs. Rock"	June 11, 2019	0.3	1.18	0.3	1.14	0.6	2.33
4	"Tank"	June 18, 2019	0.3	1.19	0.3	1.14	0.6	2.33
5	"Reap"	June 25, 2019	0.3	1.01	0.3	1.08	0.6	2.08
6	"Into the Black"	July 2, 2019	0.3	1.12	0.3	1.13	0.6	2.25
7	"Know Thy Enemy"	July 9, 2019	0.3	1.15	0.4	1.18	0.7	2.33
8	"Ambo"	July 16, 2019	0.3	1.29	0.4	1.13	0.7	2.41
9	"SHTF"	July 23, 2019	0.3	1.13	0.3	1.11	0.6	2.25
10	"Exit Strategy"	July 30, 2019	0.3	1.13	0.3	1.14	0.6	2.27
11	"Julia"	August 6, 2019	0.3	1.20	0.4	1.13	0.7	2.33
12	"Ghosts"	August 13, 2019	0.4	1.42	0.3	1.09	0.7	2.51
13	"Smurf"	August 20, 2019	0.4	1.39	0.3	0.98	0.7	2.37

=== Season 5 ===
Viewership and ratings per episode of List of Animal Kingdom episodes
No.	Title	Air date	Rating (18–49)	Viewers (millions)	DVR (18–49)	DVR viewers (millions)	Total (18–49)	Total viewers (millions)
1	"Red Handed"	July 11, 2021	0.2	0.76	0.2	0.71	0.4	1.47
2	"What Remains"	July 18, 2021	0.3	1.17	0.2	0.89	0.5	2.06
3	"Freeride"	July 25, 2021	0.2	0.99	0.3	0.87	0.5	1.87
4	"Power"	August 1, 2021	0.2	1.00	—N/a	—N/a	—N/a	—N/a
5	"Family Business"	August 8, 2021	0.2	0.95	—N/a	—N/a	—N/a	—N/a
6	"Home Sweet Home"	August 15, 2021	0.2	0.89	0.2	0.89	0.4	1.78
7	"Splinter"	August 22, 2021	0.2	0.93	0.3	0.90	0.5	1.83
8	"Gladiators"	August 29, 2021	0.2	0.83	—N/a	—N/a	—N/a	—N/a
9	"Let It Ride"	September 5, 2021	0.2	0.94	—N/a	—N/a	—N/a	—N/a
10	"Relentless"	September 12, 2021	0.2	0.88	—N/a	—N/a	—N/a	—N/a
11	"Trust the Process"	September 19, 2021	0.2	0.85	—N/a	—N/a	—N/a	—N/a
12	"Loose Ends"	September 26, 2021	0.2	0.75	—N/a	—N/a	—N/a	—N/a
13	"Launch"	October 3, 2021	0.1	0.68	—N/a	—N/a	—N/a	—N/a

=== Season 6 ===
Viewership and ratings per episode of List of Animal Kingdom episodes
No.	Title	Air date	Rating (18–49)	Viewers (millions)	DVR (18–49)	DVR viewers (millions)	Total (18–49)	Total viewers (millions)
1	"1992"	June 19, 2022	0.1	0.46	TBD	TBD	TBD	TBD
2	"Rise"	June 19, 2022	0.1	0.36	TBD	TBD	TBD	TBD
3	"Pressure and Time"	June 26, 2022	0.1	0.68	TBD	TBD	TBD	TBD
4	"Inside Man"	June 26, 2022	0.1	0.53	TBD	TBD	TBD	TBD
5	"Covet"	July 3, 2022	0.2	0.68	TBD	TBD	TBD	TBD
6	"Diamonds Are Forever"	July 10, 2022	0.1	0.69	TBD	TBD	TBD	TBD
7	"Incognito"	July 17, 2022	0.1	0.68	TBD	TBD	TBD	TBD
8	"Revelation"	July 24, 2022	0.1	0.77	TBD	TBD	TBD	TBD
9	"Gethsemane"	July 31, 2022	0.1	0.66	TBD	TBD	TBD	TBD
10	"Clink"	August 7, 2022	0.2	0.76	TBD	TBD	TBD	TBD
11	"Hit and Run"	August 14, 2022	0.1	0.74	TBD	TBD	TBD	TBD
12	"Exodus"	August 21, 2022	0.1	0.79	TBD	TBD	TBD	TBD
13	"Fubar"	August 28, 2022	0.2	0.90	TBD	TBD	TBD	TBD
