= Salih Memecan =

Turkish cartoonist (born 1952)

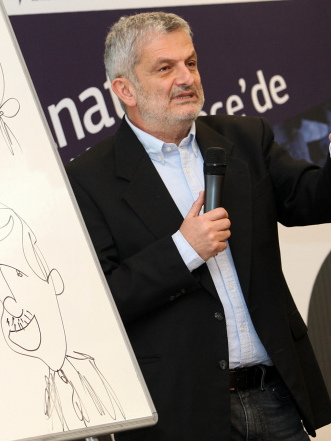
- A Turkish editorial caricaturist and cartoonist
- Born: 2 September 1952 (age 74) Giresun, Turkey
- Area: Cartoonist
- Notable works: Sizinkiler (Limon & Zeytin), Bizimcity

Salih Memecan (born 2 September 1952, Giresun, Turkey) is a Turkish editorial caricaturist and cartoonist. Memecan's political cartoon strip, Bizimcity, and comics cartoon strip, Sizinkiler, have been published daily in Sabah newspaper, one of the largest in Turkey, and weekly in the Aktüel magazine. The New York Times, The Washington Post, the San Francisco Chronicle, The Baltimore Sun and The Philadelphia Inquirer have published Memecan's editorial cartoons.

After receiving his BA and MA degrees in architecture from the Middle East Technical University in Ankara, Turkey, Memecan received his PhD in architecture from the University of Pennsylvania as a Fulbright scholar (1983).

Memecan's daily agenda included a political cartoon strip, Bizimcity, on the front page, and a comics cartoon strip, Sizinkiler, on the back page of the Sabah newspaper. The animated version of Bizimcity takes place on the prime-time news program on ATV. He was fired from Sabah newspaper in the late 2015.

Memecan became chairman of the newly formed Turkish Media Association in 2010. He is married to Mesude Nursuna Memecan, a member of the Parliament of Turkey in the AKP.

== Criticism ==
Memecan was harshly criticised for his caricature ridiculing hunger strikes of 2012. He is also condemned for his mocking of people who were killed by police during Gezi protests.
