= Sizinkiler =

Turkish comic strip

Sizinkiler (literally, "Your People"), was a daily newspaper comic strip created by the Turkish cartoonist Salih Memecan in 1991. The name of the newspaper comic strip was called Limon ile Zeytin, after Salih Memecan started releasing the strips in a compilation, he changed the title as "Sizinkiler". The strip centers around the dynamics of a everyday family life of two child anthropomorphic chickens named Limon (tr. lemon) and Zeytin (tr. olive). Sizinkiler has been adapted into a computer-animated series of 104 episodes produced by Mart Ajans with animation done by M6, Digiflame and Anima Istanbul that premiered on Turkish Disney Channel in 2014 and over 31 books.
