= The Country Mouse and the City Mouse =

"The Town Mouse and the Country Mouse" is one of Aesop's Fables from ancient times, often retold under that name or assorted variations. Works which include variations on the title or subject matter (or both) of "The Town Mouse and the Country Mouse" include:

- "Mus Urbanus et Mus Rusticus" ('The City Mouse and the Country Mouse') (about 35 BC), Latin poem, II.VI.77–115 of the Satires by Horace
- "The Twa Mice" (circa 1480s), Scots adaption of "The Town Mouse and the Country Mouse"
- The Hind and the Panther Transvers'd to the Story of the Country-Mouse and the City-Mouse (1687), English satire by Charles Montagu, 1st Earl of Halifax
- The Tale of Johnny Town-Mouse (1918), English children's book by Beatrix Potter based on "The Town Mouse and the Country Mouse"
- Le Rat de Ville et le Rat des Champs ('The Town Rat and the Country Rat') (1927), French animated film by Ladislas Starevich
- The Country Cousin (1936), American animated short film based on "The Town Mouse and the Country Mouse"
- "The City Mouse and the Country Mouse" (1977), an episode of Basil's Cartoon Story Book
- "Country Mouse, City Mouse" (In the Heat of the Night) (1989), American TV episode
- The Country Mouse and the City Mouse: A Christmas Tale (1993), American TV special
- The Country Mouse and the City Mouse Adventures (1998–2001), French-Canadian-American animated TV series
- "Gratitude" (2000), American animated TV episode of Adventures from the Book of Virtues based on "The Town Mouse and the Country Mouse"

== See also ==
- Country mouse, an Australian species of mouse
