= Virtual Hero =

Spanish animated TV series

- Created by: Rubén "El Rubius" Doblas
- Based on: Virtual Hero by Lolita Aldea
- Written by: Juan Torres; Alexis Barroso
- Directed by: Alexis Barroso
- Voices of: Rubén "El Rubius" Doblas; Graciela Molina; Nuria Trifol; Miguel Ángel "Mangel" Rogel; Sergio Zamora; Joël Mulachs; Elisabeth Bargalló; Juan Carlos Gustems; Pep Sais; Carme Calvell
- Opening theme: El libro de las sombras by Mägo de Oz
- Ending theme: Shelter by Porter Robinson and Madeon
- Composer: José Villar
- Countries of origin: Spain; South Korea
- Original language: Spanish
- No. of seasons: 2
- No. of episodes: 18

Production
- Executive producers: Pilar Blasco; Ismael Calleja; Domingo Corral; Felipe Pontón
- Animator: Jaruyi Studio
- Running time: 22 min.
- Production companies: Movistar+ Zeppelin TV; Motion Pictures

Original release
- Network: Movistar+
- Release: 12 October 2018 – 28 February 2020

Virtual Hero is an animated television series produced by Zeppelin TV and Motion Pictures, S.A. for Movistar+ based on the comic book trilogy of the same name created by Rubén "El Rubius" Doblas.

In September 2020, Movistar+ announced the cancellation of the series after two seasons.

== Synopsis ==
Rubius is one of the 100 selected playtesters for the ORV, an experimental virtual reality device. Connected directly to his neuronal network, these glasses transport him to a computer game universe known as the Game Worlds. Little does Rubius know, it's all part of an evil plan hatched by Trollmask, the devious Master of the Game Worlds, who is holding the players hostage in this virtual setting so that they all witness his victory over Rubius. Alongside his allies Sakura, Zombirella, Slimmer and G4T0, this unlikely hero will take on the challenges of the Game Worlds to free the players from Trollmask's clutches.

== Cast ==
Character	Voice (Spanish)	Voice (English)
Main cast
Rubius	Rubén "El Rubius" Doblas	Unknown
Sakura	Graciela Molina	Unknown
Zombirella	Nuria Trifol	Jenny Beacraft
Mangel	Miguel Ángel "Mangel" Rogel	Unknown
Trollmask	Sergio Zamora	Masumi Mutsuda
Demonika	Joël Mulachs	Unknown
G4T0	Elisabeth Bargalló	Caitlyn Mary Mac
Slimmer	Juan Carlos Gustems	Alex Warner
Guruf	Pep Sais	Unknown
Silueta	Carme Calvell	Unknown
Secondary cast
Maddy Model	Marina García Guevara	Unknown
Captain Legarde	Daniel García	Daniel Francis-Berenson
Ben	Raúl Rodríguez	Unknown
Nancy	Marta Barbará	Unknown
Professor Brasas	Rafael Calvo	Mark Schardan
Armadurón	Alfonso Vallés	Unknown
Patitas	Ramón Canals	Unknown
Limón 4K	Jordi Ribes	Unknown

== Episode list ==
=== Season 1 ===
No. overall	No. in season	Title	Original release date
1	1	"Un artefacto misterioso"	12 October 2018
2	2	"Monstruo de ciudad, monstruo de campo"	12 October 2018
3	3	"Cosas grandes y cuadradas"	12 October 2018
4	4	"La hora del té"	12 October 2018
5	5	"Animalitos sueltos"	12 October 2018
6	6	"La batalla de Puerto Panoli"	12 October 2018
7	7	"Un mundo real"	23 November 2018
8	8	"Doppelgänger"	30 November 2018
9	9	"Un pirata metepatas"	7 December 2018
10	10	"Yourface"	14 December 2018
11	11	"Cyberblade"	21 December 2018
12	12	"Reverso tenebroso"	28 December 2018

=== Season 2 ===
No. overall	No. in season	Title	Original release date
13	1	"Alas negras"	28 February 2020
14	2	"Actualizaciones"	28 February 2020
15	3	"Sacrificios"	28 February 2020
16	4	"Los que vienen a morir te saludan, Maddy"	28 February 2020
17	5	"Retazos del pasado"	28 February 2020
18	6	"Game (not) over"	28 February 2020

== Reception ==
Virtual Hero has received mixed reviews among television critics. On a positive note, Alberto Cano wrote for eCartelera that Virtual Hero is "a series that, in spite of betting on elements already seen on the likes of Ready Player One or Spy Kids 3-D: Game Over, manages to build a varied, attractive universe with its own personality, resulting in a fresh, fun animated fiction that rises as a notable product for the young audience." On the negative side, Espinof dismissed the show as "a poor imitation of the shōnen genre" and "an animated fanzine with no pretension or quality".
