= Lingopie =

VOD platform for language learning

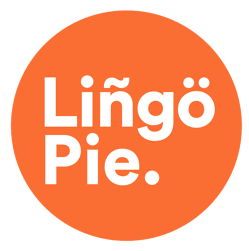
- Company type: Private company
- Industry: Online education; Language Learning software; E-Learning; Education Technology; Entertainment & Media
- Founded: 2018; 8 years ago
- Founders: David Datny; Roy Oppenheim
- Headquarters: Tel Aviv, Israel
- Key people: David Datny (CEO)
- Products: Lingopie Kids, Lingopie Music, Lingopie Lessons, Lingopie TV App
- Services: VOD; Private tutoring; Language-learning tools
- Website: lingopie.com

Lingopie is a subscription-based video-on-demand (VOD) platform for language learning. Founded in 2018, Lingopie integrates interactive language learning tools with streaming content, featuring capabilities such as dual subtitles, video-based flashcards, and gamified review drills. The platform maintains a curated library of original productions and acquired international titles, including television shows, movies, and multimedia content in their original languages.

As of February 2025, Lingopie offers content in twelve languages: Spanish, French, Italian, Portuguese, German, Russian, Japanese, Korean, Chinese, English, Turkish, Dutch, Greek, Polish, and Hebrew. The platform is available on the web, mobile devices (Android and iOS), and smart TVs.

== History ==
Lingopie is an Israeli company incorporated in Tel Aviv in 2021.

In March 2020, Lingopie secured seed funding. In 2021, the company was among the ten Israeli startups selected for Google for Startups, a growth lab program launched by Google Israel in 2018 that now runs in 14 countries.

== Concept & Methodology ==
Lingopie employs an immersive language acquisition methodology integrating video-on-demand (VOD) content with interactive language learning tools and spaced repetition systems. The platform's primary pedagogical approach, known as “binge-learning,” synthesizes entertainment media consumption with structured language acquisition processes.

The methodology centers on authentic target-language content, including television programs, feature films, audiobooks, and podcasts, which expose learners to naturalistic language patterns, colloquialisms, and contextual grammar usage. This approach aligns with contemporary research on implicit language acquisition through meaningful input, as described in Krashen’s input hypothesis.

The "binge-learning” methodology structured by Lingopie operates through five progressive phases:

- Silent Binge Phase: Initial exposure to native-level content through entertainment media
- Interactive Phase: Content review using dual subtitles, translations, and interactive transcripts
- Comprehension Phase: Reinforcement through games, quizzes, and interactive exercises
- Speaking Phase: Oral practice through speech recognition and live sessions with native speakers
- Advanced Fluency Phase: Progressive engagement with more complex native content

Lingopie’s core instructional design relies on dual-language subtitles. Every show includes two sets of subtitles, one in the user's native language and one in the target language. Users can click on the words they don't know and obtain an instant translation. All the words the users click on become flashcards that they can later review and study. Users can also play minigames and quizzes to review. The video player includes other language-learning tools to facilitate the learning process, such as different video speed options, grammar quizzes, and features to practice their listening and speaking skills.

Beyond its core platform, Lingopie developed specialized learning environments to cater to different learning preferences and needs. In 2025, the company launched Short Stories by Lingopie, an interactive reading feature that combines bite-sized narratives with language learning tools.

=== Lingopie Kids ===
Launched as a child-focused extension of the main platform, Lingopie Kids provides age-appropriate content while maintaining the core interactive learning tools. The platform features curated content specifically selected for young language learners, including animated series, educational programs, and children's entertainment content.

=== Lingopie Music ===
As a complementary service, Lingopie Music applies the platform's interactive learning methodology to music-based content.

=== Lingopie Lessons ===
Lingopie offers live language instruction, including private one-on-one and group lessons taught by native-speaking tutors.

=== Lingopie TV App ===
Developed for smart television platforms, the TV application extends Lingopie’s learning environment to television devices. As of 2024, the platform hosts approximately 3,000 hours of multilingual content, including feature films, television series, podcast content, and music videos.

== Languages Offered ==
Lingopie provides language learning content through various language pairs, with some languages serving as both source (L1) and target (L2) languages. The platform’s content availability varies based on the language combination. As of 2025, the following language pairs are supported:

L1	L2 Languages
English	Spanish, French, Italian, German, Portuguese, Russian, Japanese, Korean, Chinese, Dutch, Turkish, Greek, Polish
Spanish	English, French, Italian, German
French	English, Spanish, Italian, German
German	English, Spanish, French, Italian
Italian	English, Spanish, French, German
Portuguese	English, Spanish, French, Italian, German

== Platform Availability ==
Lingopie is available for streaming via web browsers on Windows, macOS, and Linux operating systems, as well as through dedicated applications on mobile and television platforms. The service can be accessed through native iOS and Android mobile device apps.

For television viewing, Lingopie offers dedicated apps on Android TV, Google TV, and Roku streaming devices. The platform maintains consistent functionality across devices, including its interactive language learning features and synchronized progress tracking.

== Content ==
Lingopie has acquired content from several different independent producers and public broadcasting networks including RTVE, the largest public broadcasting network in Spain, Latino-owned Fuse Media, Japanese animation studio TMS, and German public-service television broadcaster ZDF, among others:

Spanish:

- Caracol
- TV Azteca
- Pakapaka
- Superights
- Jetpack
- Motion Pictures
- Mondo TV

French:

- Film and Pictures
- Newen Studios
- Mediawan

Japanese:

- Fuji TV
- TBS

Korean:

- EBS
- YTN
- Grafizix
- JEI TV

Russian:

- Star Media

German:

- Autentic
- UCM.ONE
- STUDIO HAMBURG

Italian:

- Lux

== Reception ==
PC Magazine gave Lingopie 3.5 out of 5 stars, stating that it offers a competitively priced annual subscription and has quality videos, but that the interface offers little guidance and has room for improvement.

In 2022, Good Housekeeping also recognized Lingopie as one of the 15 best apps to learn Spanish. In 2022, Lingopie was chosen as one of the “top language learning solutions” by EdTech Digest for their EdTech Cool Tool Awards.
