= Jewry (surname) =

Jewry is a surname. Notable people with the surname include:

- Bernard Jewry, birth name of English singer Alvin Stardust (1942–2014)
- Laura Jewry, birth name of English writer Laura Valentine (1814–1899)
