= John R. Dilworth =

American animator and director (born 1963)

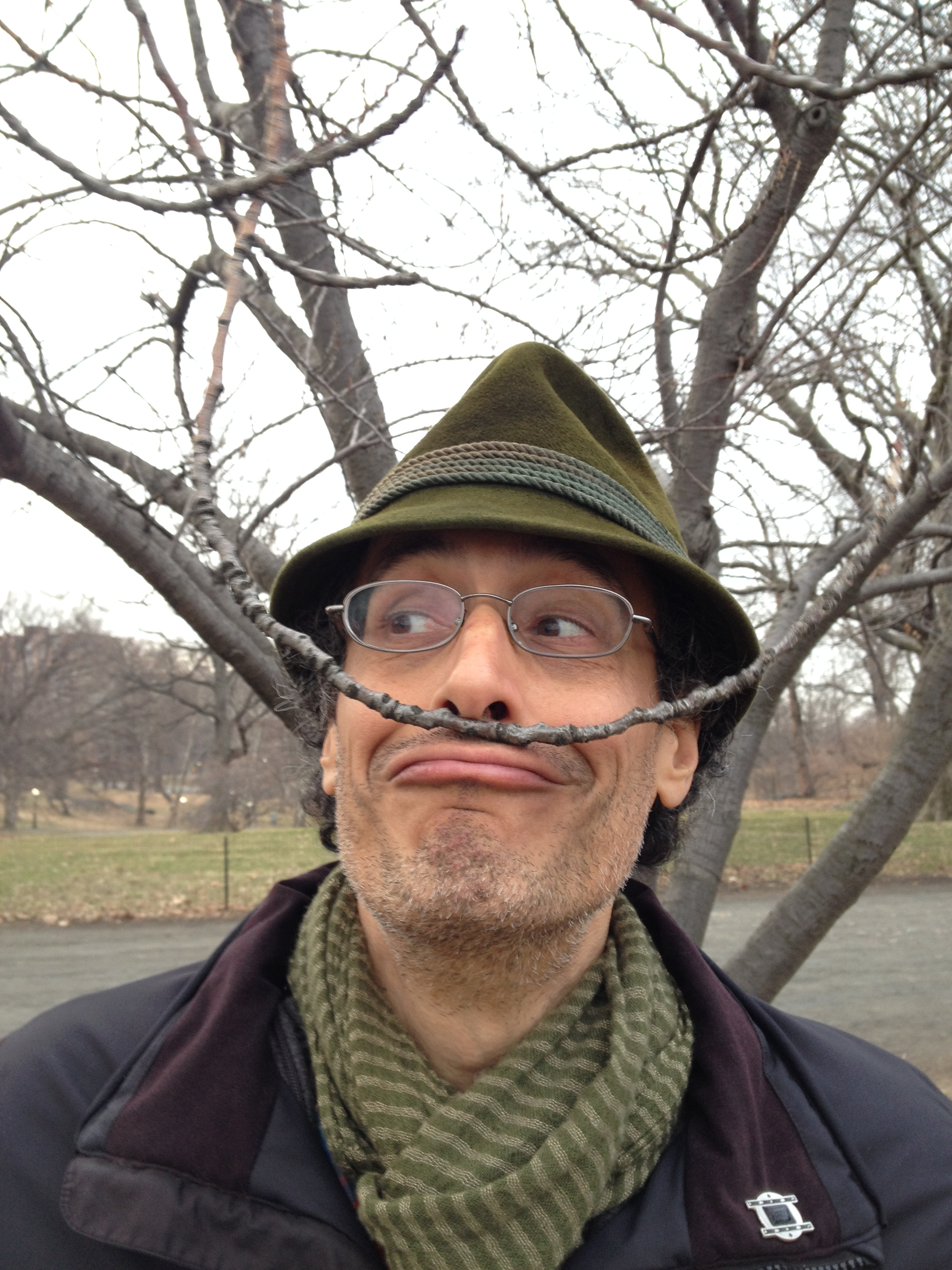
- Dilworth in 2014
- Born: John Russell Dilworth; February 14, 1963 (age 63); New York City, New York, U.S.
- Education: School of Visual Arts
- Occupations: Animator, actor, writer, director, storyboard artist, producer
- Years active: 1982–present
- Known for: Courage the Cowardly Dog

John Russell Dilworth (born February 14, 1963) is an American animator, actor, writer, director, storyboard artist, producer and the creator of the animated television series Courage the Cowardly Dog. Dilworth's works have appeared on PBS, CBS, Showtime, HBO, Fox, ABC, NBC, Arte, CBC Television, YTV, Teletoon, BBC Two, Cartoon Network, Nickelodeon, Comedy Central and MTV, among others.

== Career ==
John Russell Dilworth was born on February 14, 1963, in New York City.

After graduating from the School of Visual Arts, Dilworth became an art director at Baldi, Bloom and Whelan Advertising. During this period, he worked on his own films in his spare time, providing much of his own funding. His animated short, The Chicken from Outer Space, was nominated for an Academy Award in 1996. Cartoon Network later commissioned Dilworth to turn the short into a series, which eventually became Courage the Cowardly Dog. He also worked on the original opening for Nicktoons and worked on Doug. He also directed the pilot episode of Sniz & Fondue titled Psyched for Snuppa. Dilworth created the series of nine animated shorts for Sesame Street based on his independent film, "Noodles & Nedd". "Nedd" is named after the author Nedd Willard, a mentor.

Dilworth's short Angry Cabaret was also featured in MTV's 1994 Animation Weekend. His breakout film was The Dirdy Birdy, which aired on MTV's Cartoon Sushi and on Comedy Central. He was animation consultant of Gumby: The Movie, and was also one of the directors of Drew Carey's Green Screen Show. Dilworth was also an animator and layout artist on the first two videotapes of Richard Scarry's Best Video Series Ever!.

Dilworth appears in pixilation sequences in the 2013 animated short Subconscious Password by Chris Landreth.

In 2017, Dilworth completed a new short film, Goose in High Heels. The film could previously be viewed on his YouTube channel, Stretch Films; however, it currently is not available online for viewing.

=== Stretch Films ===
Stretch Films
- Type: Animation studio
- Industry: Animation
- Founded: January 23, 1991
- Founder: John R. Dilworth
- Headquarters: New York City, United States
- Products: The Dirdy Birdy; Courage the Cowardly Dog

Stretch Films, Inc. is Dilworth's production company that was founded in 1991. It is best known for Cartoon Network's Courage the Cowardly Dog, but the company has produced other works as well. Dilworth serves as the company president.

== Filmography ==
- Pierre (1985) (student film; appeared on Showtime)
- The Limited Bird (1989; aired on Fox)
- Earthday Birthday (1990)
- When Lilly Laney Moved In (1991; aired on Comedy Central following its launch)
- Psyched for Snuppa (1992) (Jumbo Pictures for Nickelodeon)
- Smart Talk with Raisin (1993) (Appeared on MTV's Liquid Television in 1994)
- The Dirdy Birdy (1994) (Redux aired in 2014)
- Angry Cabaret (1994) (Also appeared on MTV Animation Weekend)
- Cartoon Network (IDs) (1994–1997)
- The Chicken from Outer Space (1996) Academy Award-nominated short
- Noodles and Nedd (1996) (later appeared on Sesame Street)
- Big Bag: Ace and Avery (1998)
- Hector The Get-Over Cat (1998) – Indent for Nickelodeon.
- A Little Curious (short films) (1999)
- Courage the Cowardly Dog (series) (1999–2002)
- Catch of the Day (featuring Noodles and Nedd) (2000)
- Courage in Scary Monsters (2000; Web Premiere Toons short)
- The Mousochist (2001)
- Life in Transition (2005)
- The Return of Sergeant Pecker (2006, credited as Pierre Delarue)
- Garlic Boy (2008)
- Rinky Dink (2009)
- Bunny Bashing (2011)
- Pumpkin Reports (2012) – CGI pilot episode made by Spanish studio Motion Pictures, S.A., that hired John to direct the pilot. In 2016, the pilot was turned in a TV series.
- The Fog of Courage (2014) – A special CGI short starring Courage the Cowardly Dog.
- The Dirdy Birdy Redux (2014)
- Dirdy Birdy II: A Night at Club Sheik (2015) – A cancelled sequel to The Dirdy Birdy.
- Prudence and the Imps (2016) – An unfinished animated pilot.
- Goose in High Heels (2017)
- Howl If You Love Me (2023)
- Goblins of Litter (2024)
