= Aunt Louisa's Nursery Favourite =

1870 book by Laura Valentine

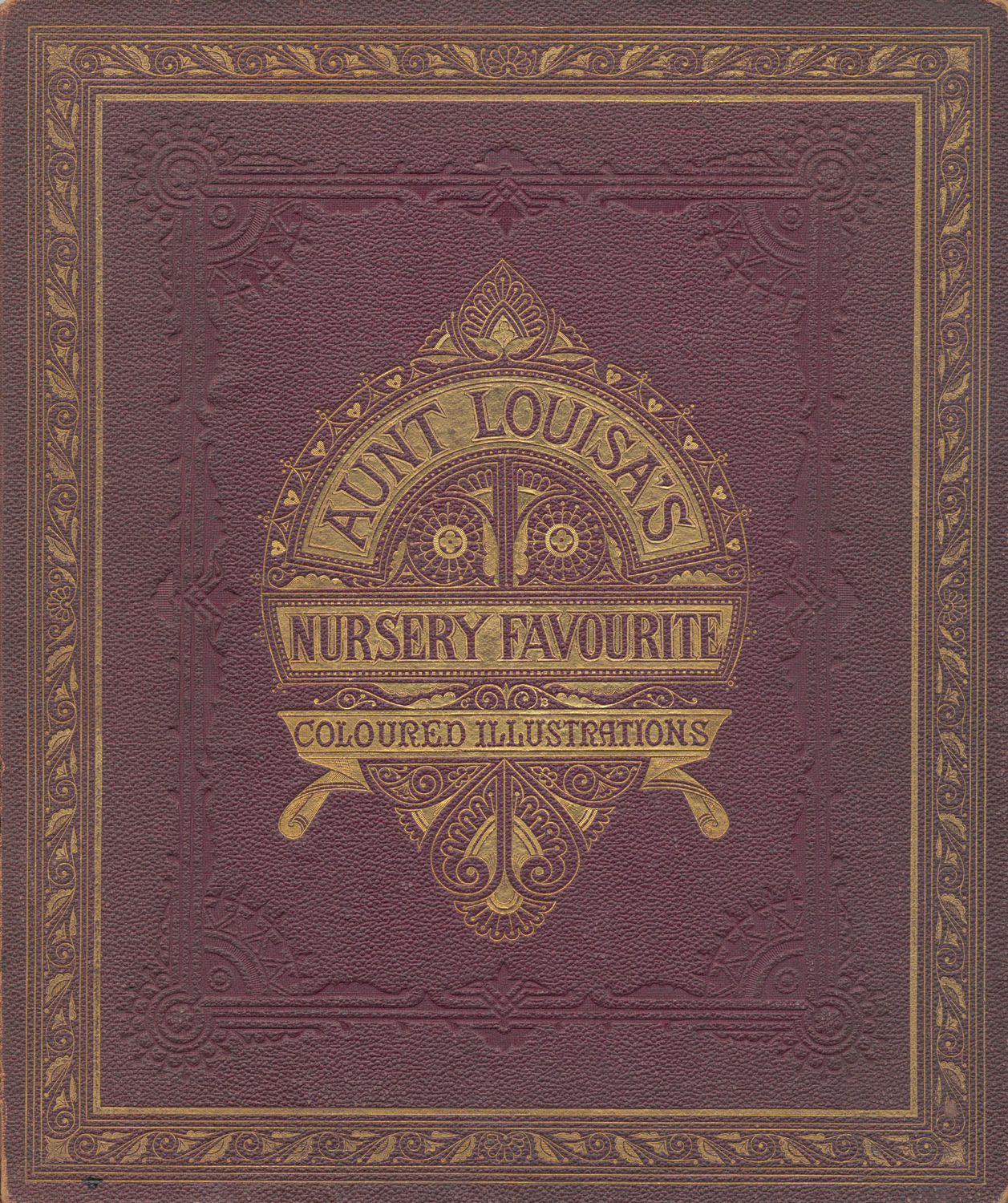
- Book cover
- Author: Laura Valentine
- Language: English
- Publisher: Frederick Warne and Co.(London); Scribner, Welford and Co. (USA)
- Publication date: 1870
- Publication place: United Kingdom
- Media type: Print

Aunt Louisa's Nursery Favourite is a book by Laura Valentine released in 1870 and containing stories like "Diamonds and Toads", "Lily Sweetbriar", "Dick Whittington" and "Uncle's Farm Yard".
