= Glumpers =

Spanish animated television series

- Genre: Animated miniseries
- Created by: MAKE
- Developed by: Motion Pictures, S.A.
- Written by: Juan Carlos Ramis; Jose Mª Pérez Quintero
- Directed by: Enrique Uviedo; Pere Clos
- Theme music composer: Miquel Tejada
- Country of origin: Spain
- Original language: None (no dialogue)
- No. of series: 2
- No. of episodes: 104

Production
- Producer: Enrique Uviedo
- Running time: 2 minutes
- Production company: Motion Pictures (Spain)

Glumpers is a Spanish CGI animated television series by Motion Pictures, S.A. (Spain) co-produced with Televisió de Catalunya. The series consists of two seasons, which have 104 episodes of 2 minutes each.

== Synopsis ==
The Glumpers are a gang of blob-like creatures who live together. Each 2-minute episode revolves around them getting involved with everyday situations, along with some more bizarre ones.

== Characters ==
The Glumpers are a group of friends with totally stereotyped and conflicting personalities who live, or at least try, in a beautiful house outside Glumperona. There are six main quirky leading glumpers:

- Fubble is the essence of laziness, he hates any kind of physical exercise, excepting jaw movement, eating is his other big passion.
- Quigly is a hyper-active little glumper, who is always in high spirits, he does everything too much Quigly, so, almost always he tends to put his foot in it.
- Webster is quiet and shy, but always shows up how to join in the fun. Submissive and good-natured, he's always in the mood for playing...
- Gobo is a big size happy-go-lucky glumper who is a master chef and graceful dancer. He is the only one who tries to make the common sense come up, a misunderstood leader.
- Dudd is the most mischievous glumper and Booker's brother.
- Booker is the smartest glumper, who is highly gifted, the opposite of his brother: Dudd.
