= The Town Mouse and the Country Mouse =

Fable by Aesop

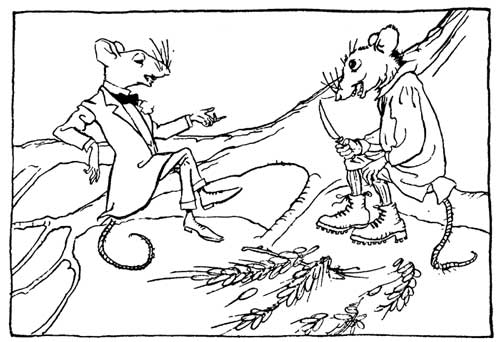
Aesop's Fables (1912), illustrated by Arthur Rackham.

"The Town Mouse and the Country Mouse" is one of Aesop's Fables. It is number 352 in the Perry Index and type 112 in Aarne–Thompson's folk tale index. Like several other elements in Aesop's fables, "town mouse and country mouse" has become an English idiom.

== Story ==
In the original tale, a proud town mouse visits his cousin in the country. The country mouse offers the city mouse a meal of simple country cuisine, at which the visitor scoffs and invites the country mouse back to the city for a taste of the "fine life" and the two cousins dine on white bread and other fine foods. But their rich feast is interrupted by a cat which forces the rodent cousins to abandon their meal and retreat back into their mouse hole for safety. The town mouse tells the country mouse that the cat killed his mother and father and that he is frequently the target of attacks. After hearing this, the country mouse decides to return home, preferring security to opulence or, as the 13th-century preacher Odo of Cheriton phrased it, "I'd rather gnaw a bean than be gnawed by continual fear".

== Spread ==
The story was widespread in Classical times and there is an early Greek version by Babrius (Fable 108). Horace included it as part of one of his satires (II.6), ending on this story in a poem comparing town living unfavorably to life in the country. Marcus Aurelius alludes to it in his Meditations, Book 11.22; "Think of the country mouse and of the town mouse, and of the alarm and trepidation of the town mouse".

However, it seems to have been the 12th century Anglo-Norman writer Walter of England who contributed most to the spread of the fable throughout medieval Europe. His Latin version (or that of Odo of Cheriton) has been credited as the source of the fable that appeared in the Spanish Libro de Buen Amor of Juan Ruiz in the first half of the 14th century. Walter was also the source for several manuscript collections of Aesop's fables in Italian and equally of the popular Esopi fabulas by Accio Zucco da Sommacampagna, the first printed collection of Aesop's fables in that language (Verona, 1479), in which the story of the town mouse and the country mouse appears as fable 12. This consists of two sonnets, the first of which tells the story and the second contains a moral reflection.

== British variations ==
British poetical treatments of the story vary widely. The Scottish Henryson's The Taill of the Uponlandis Mous and the Burges Mous makes the two mice sisters. The one in the country envies her sister's rich living and pays her a visit, only to be chased by a cat and return home, contented with her own lot. Four final stanzas (lines 190–221) draw out the moral that it is better to limit one's ambition and one's appetites, warning those who make the belly their god that "The cat cummis and to the mous hes ee".

Henryson attributes the story to Esope, myne author where Sir Thomas Wyatt makes it a song sung by "My mothers maydes when they did sowe and spynne" in the second of his satires. This is more in accord with Horace's description of it as "an old wives' tale" but Wyatt's retelling otherwise echoes Henryson's: an impoverished country mouse visits her sister in town but is caught by the cat. In the second half of the poem (lines 70–112) Wyatt addresses his interlocutor John Poynz on the vanity of human wishes. Horace, on the other hand, had discussed his own theme at great length before closing on the story.

By contrast, the adaptation in La Fontaine's Fables, Le rat de ville et le rat des champs (I.9), is simply told. There it is the town rat that invites the country rat home, only to have the meal disturbed by dogs (as in Horace); the country rat then departs, reflecting, as in Aesop, that peace is preferable to fearful plenty.

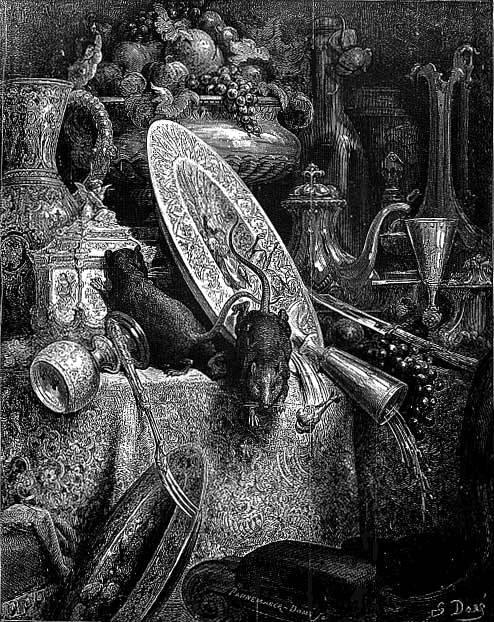
Gustave Doré's illustration of La Fontaine's fable

Adaptations dating from Britain's "Augustan Age" concentrate upon the Horatian version of the fable. The reference is direct in The hind and the panther transvers'd to the story of the country-mouse and the city mouse, written by Charles Montagu, 1st Earl of Halifax and Matthew Prior in 1687. This was a satire directed against a piece of pro-Stuart propaganda and portrays the poet John Dryden (under the name of Bayes) proposing to elevate Horace's "dry naked History" into a religious allegory (pp. 4ff).

Part of the fun there is that in reality the Horatian retelling is far more sophisticated than the "plain simple thing" that Bayes pretends it is, especially in its depiction of Roman town-life at the height of its power. It is this aspect of Horace's writing that is underlined by the two adaptations of his satire made by other Augustan authors. The first was a joint work by the friends Thomas Sprat and Abraham Cowley written in 1666. Horace has the story told by a garrulous countryman, a guise that Cowley takes on with delicate self-irony. It allows him to adapt the comforts of the imperial city described by Horace to those of Restoration London, with references to contemporary high cuisine and luxury furnishings such as Mortlake Tapestries. Cowley's portion appeared separately under the title of The Country Mouse in his volume of essays.

In the following century the friends Jonathan Swift and Alexander Pope combined in a similar imitation of Horace's Satire in octosyllabic couplets, with Pope playing the part of the story-teller from line 133 onwards and attributing the tale to contemporary fabulist Matthew Prior. The point of the piece is once again to make a witty transposition of the Classical scene into present-day circumstances as an extension of the poem's anachronistic fun. At a slightly later date Rowland Rugeley (1738–76) was to imitate their performance in much the same manner in "The City Mouse and Country Mouse: a fable to a friend in town". The argument has been made that, for all the fable's championing of country life, the emphasis on the urban and urbane in these poems is fully in the spirit of the Horatian original.

In all versions of the original fable, much is made of the poor fare upon which the country mouse subsists. Dried (grey) peas and bacon are frequently mentioned and it is these two that the early 19th-century author Richard Scrafton Sharpe (c. 1780–1852) uses in a repetitive refrain to his lyrical treatment of "The Country Mouse and the City Mouse". He was the author of Old friends in a new dress – or Familiar fables in verse, which went through different editions from 1807 onwards. The stories are told in song measures rather than as a narrative, and it was in a later edition that this retelling appeared.

== Eastern analogies ==
A similar story appears among the fables of Bidpai as "The Lean Cat and the Fat Cat". It is related that 'There was once a poor, lean old woman, who lived in a tiny, tumbled-down house, with a cat as poor and as lean as herself. This cat had never tasted a bit of bread, and had come no nearer a mouse than to find its tracks in the dust.' A sleek, plump cat boasts to her of how it feasts at the king's table and invites her to come and join in next day. The poor woman advises her pet to be content with its lot. Unheeding, the lean cat sets off for the palace. Owing to its infestation by cats, however, the king had ordered that any caught there were to be put to death. The lean cat dies, regretting that it had not listened to the old woman's wise advice.

== Later adaptations ==
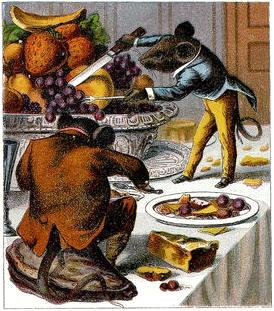
An illustration from Aunt Louisa's Oft Told Tales, New York c.1870

Beatrix Potter retold the story in The Tale of Johnny Town-Mouse (1918). In this she inverted the order of the visits, with the country mouse going to the city first, being frightened by a cat and disliking the food. Returning the visit later, the town mouse is frightened of the rain, the lawnmower and the danger of being stepped on by cows. The story concludes with the reflection that tastes differ. A segment from the tale was incorporated into the children's ballet film The Tales of Beatrix Potter, danced by the Royal Ballet with choreography by Frederick Ashton (1971). The ballet was subsequently performed onstage in 1992 and 2007.

In 1927 the story was made into a French silent film, with puppet animation by the director Wladyslaw Starewicz, under the title Le Rat de Ville et le Rat des Champs. In this updated version, the urban rat drives out of Paris in his car to visit his cousin on the farm. They return to the city and visit a nightclub but their revels end in pandemonium with the arrival of a cat. Recognizing that city life is too hectic for him, the country rat prefers to dream of his urban adventure from the safety of his home. The American equivalent was the Silly Symphonies cartoon The Country Cousin (1936), in which the country mouse hikes along the railroad track to visit his cousin in the city. The main action takes place on the supper table and is governed by the unexplained need for silence. When the reason for this is revealed as the cat, the cousin escapes into the street, only to face the worse hazards of the traffic.

In 1980, the fable was whimsically adapted by Evelyn Lambart for the National Film Board of Canada using paper figures and brightly coloured backgrounds. Other cartoons much more loosely based on the fables have included Mouse in Manhattan (1945) and The Country Mouse and the City Mouse: A Christmas Tale (HBO 1993), which eventually led to the television series The Country Mouse and the City Mouse Adventures.

In the UK, Vicky Ireland dramatised the fable for Merseyside Young People's Theatre in 1987. The 80-minute play has since been acted in the US, South Africa and New Zealand. It features William Boot, a country mouse bored with rural life at his grandmother's house, who is visited by his city cousin and learns that he has inherited Tallyhoe Lodge in London. They leave to run a gauntlet of adventures, from which William returns to settle gratefully in his peaceful country retreat.

Among musical interpretations, there have been the following:

- Louis-Nicolas Clérambault set words based on La Fontaine's fable in the 1730s
- Jacques Offenbach included it in Six Fables de La Fontaine (1842) for soprano and small orchestra
- Benjamin Godard, the last of his Six Fables de La Fontaine (op. 17, 1872/9)
- Auguste Moutin (1821–1900) set it as a song in 1876.
- Ernest Reyer set La Fontaine's fable for his own performance
- Jean-René Quignard for 2 children's voices
- Isabelle Aboulker's setting of La Fontaine's words is on her composite CD Les Fables Enchantées (1979)
- Ida Gotkovsky, the third fable in her Hommage à Jean de La Fontaine for choir and orchestra, commissioned for the tercentenary of La Fontaine's death (1995)
- Claude Ballif, the fourth of his Chansonettes : 5 Fables de La Fontaine for small mixed choir (Op72, Nº1 1995)
