= Pumpkin Reports =

Spanish-Malaysian-Italian television series

- Genre: Science fiction; Comedy
- Developed by: Alberto Alcázar; Francisco Javier Galán; Oriol Roca; Ángel Coronado; Pere Clos; Ian Carney; John R. Dilworth; Alexis Barroso; Xavi Mas; Oscar Albert; Tony Albert
- Written by: Alexis Barroso; Pol López Grau; Andrew Nicholls; Darrell Vickers
- Directed by: Alexis Barroso
- Voices of: Dylan Jones; Matt Ban; Shannon Conley; Onalea Gilbertson; Stephanie Pam Roberts; H. D. Quinn; Lindsay Sheppard; Pietro Ubaldi
- Theme music composer: Raniero Gaspari
- Composer: Raniero Gaspari
- Countries of origin: Spain; Malaysia; Italy
- Original language: English
- No. of seasons: 1
- No. of episodes: 52 (and 1 pilot)

Production
- Executive producers: Oscar Albert; Leow Teik Cheng; Giuseppe Franchi
- Producers: Tony Albert; Enrique Uviedo; Leow Teik Cheng; Paolo Favarin; Regis Brown
- Cinematography: Jacob Carmona
- Editors: Alexis Barroso; José Manuel Ruíz
- Running time: 11 minutes
- Production companies: Motion Pictures; Young Jump Animation; Sample; Rai Fiction; Stretch Films (uncredited)

Original release
- Network: Clan
- Release: October 31, 2015 – April 23, 2016

Pumpkin Reports is an animated science fiction comedy television series. It was produced by Motion Pictures and was broadcast from October 31, 2015, to April 23, 2016, on Nickelodeon, Clan, and Rai Gulp. 52 episodes were produced.

== Plot ==
Loom and Ran are Kemiies who were sent to the Earth in order to send back reports and plan the invasion. Max Green's relatively normal life changes after he discovers that. Since his parents will not believe him, Max is left to stop the Kemiies' earth-dominating plots. Max receives help from his friends, including Violet – Max's friendly nemesis since kindergarten, Pixel – the town's nerd and most convinced alien believer, and Simon Sillicon – a genius scientist fallen into disgrace. Most of Loom's and Ran's plans are failed causing the invasion to be put off. All that comes to change later Loom's soulmate, who is a human. With his help the invasion is getting closer.

== Characters ==
=== Loom Prxbtlyp ===
Loom Prxbtlyp, also referred to as her civilian name, Teresa Green (voiced by Onalea Gilbertson), is, upon first inspection, a polite, neatly-dressed, well-behaved pre-teen girl who was adopted by the Greens family. She's a straight-A student and respects her elders. But in actuality she is a Kemii dedicated to taking over the earth and enslaving its inhabitants, as her job is to send nightly reports describing the human race to the orbiting Kemii to speed up the impending invasion and later to start the invasion. She has trouble grasping the subtleties of human nature, and tends to see humans as illogical and like an ant farm. Loom has a very sensitive side and sometimes becomes more human than a Kemii. Later her soulmate came in the series and together they plan the invasion and their ruling.

Loom chose her disguise of a cute 12-year-old Teresa based on characters she saw on a movie billboard from across the Greens' house, and named his brother Goliath off of a dog's ID tag.

=== Ran Strb ===
Ran Strb, also referred to as his civilian name, Goliath Green (voiced by Pietro Ubaldi), is a 380-year-old Kemii who was nearing retirement when he got his assignment and thought the job would be a drag. Ran doesn't speak in any Earth languages, and instead speaks only the Kemii language. His body is heavily clothed and he has a mop of pumpkin-orange hair, so only a portion of his face is ever shown. He also has a long vegetal tail with a mind of its own, and can extend a slimy psedupodal green stalk-body on which he can elevate his kindergarten-sized self to an intimidating 20-feet high.

=== Max Green ===
Max Green (voiced by Shannon Conley) is an energetic, bossy, underhand 11-year-old. He is good at sports, talented in music and academics, and was popular at school until Loom and Ran, his adoptive "siblings" showed up and stole the show. His goal is to make people believe his alien siblings theory for attempting to use his home as a home base for stealing Earth, and to stop their daily reports about the human race to their home planet, Kemii.

=== Violet Violet ===
Violet Violet (voiced by Stephanie Pam Roberts) is an 11-year-old girl with a BIG fashion sense and a blog describing how she'd like to improve the world – its music, aesthetics, and especially its rigid, closed-minded people; like the teachers who won't let her wear a swan hat to class.

She wears violet clothing, dyes her hair violet, and is looking for a violet pet. To her, the color represents the repudiation of conformity. Her being strong-willed is a problem, because Max is strong-willed too. These two, competitors in school and now in saving the planet, seldom see eye-to-eye. Each one wants to run their alien-busting outfit and each chafes at anything sounding like "orders" coming from the other.

=== Pixel Sillicon ===
Pixel Sillicon (voiced by Dylan Jones) is a fool 11‐year‐old who loves aliens. His father is a dedicated UFOlogist, which accounts for Pixel's interest, but not for the depth of his ardor. Pixel believes he was abducted by aliens and he sincerely hopes to be abducted again one day – so he leaves his bedroom window open at night and has an arrow of lights on the roof pointing to his room.

Pixel's easy credulity makes him a less-than-perfect ally for Max's campaign to convince the townspeople. He's loyal to his good friend Max, not least because Max actually lives with two aliens. Despite his admiration of Max and acknowledgment of Max as the anti-invasion Team Leader, Pixel is romantically attracted to Loom, and believed he and she could rule earth between them as benevolent King and Queen before seeing her soulmate and their plans of ruling their kingdom.

=== Simon Sillicon ===
Simon Sillicon (voiced by Matt Ban) is Pixel's father who abandoned his foundational computer work (which resulted in a famous Valley in California being named after him) to devote his genius to discovering the aliens he has been convinced have been walking among us for 30 years.

The scientific community shunned Simon years ago, leading Simon to invent gadgets and computer programs to fight the alien onslaught he believes is coming. Simon is very focused on his devices and computer algorithms, so he does not mind being bossed‐around by two kids. He is to be of service in any plan that Max or Violet contrive.

Simon has a mysterious past. There are files which are getting him involved in a big scandal.

=== Victor Green ===
Victor Green (voiced by H.D. Quinn) is a loving, if somewhat distracted, father and a doting husband. He has the ambition of doing great things for his family. He and his son, Max share a positive outlook on life, and a slight tendency to be unrealistically optimistic. He is a mid-level executive at Cucurtown's biggest business, Cutlery Land.

=== Laura Green ===
Laura Green (voiced by Lindsay Sheppard) is Max's mother and Victor's wife. Her primo gourd-growth is the main reason her backyard was chosen by Loom for the Kemii Advance Team, and her prize-winning pumpkin is alien headquarters. Laura is a homemaker with a college degree in botany, but she also has a big ambition; to compete on the Television game show Who Knows What with her large, growing expertise in koalas and Australian Rules Football.

== Episodes ==
=== Pilot (2010) ===
Title	Directed by	Written by	Original release date
"Pumpkin Reports"	John R. Dilworth	John R. Dilworth	March 25, 2010
Max wants to paint the house but the others had done it. Max was jealous and start breaking the pumpkins. He will not have any pumpkin meatloaf for dinner. He will go up to his room and play his guitar.

=== Season 1 (2015–16) ===
No. overall	Segment no.	Title	Directed by	Written by	Original release date
1	1a	"Eyes Closed Friday"	Alexis Barroso	Alexis Barroso and Pol López Grau	October 31, 2015
Humans would be so much easier to invade from above if they didn't look at the sky, so Teresa creates a brand new superstition that has everyone closing their eyes for one hour on Friday.
2	1b	"Fear Itself"	Alexis Barroso	Alexis Barroso and Pol López Grau	October 31, 2015
The discovery of phobias inspires Teresa to build a device that probes humans' minds for what they're most scared of, then creates it right in front of them. Each member of the Team Alien must confront his or her own greatest fear.
3	2a	"Crazy in Love"	Alexis Barroso	Andrew Nicholls & Darrell Vickers	November 7, 2015
When Teresa learns about love, she decides that an extreme version of this silly emotion might be used to render humans so love-struck they're useless.
4	2a	"Indecision"	Alexis Barroso	Andrew Nicholls & Darrell Vickers	November 7, 2015
Teresa uses Kemii Indecision Sludge to render her parents, and Max and his friends, totally incapable of making a decision, then goes about enacting her plan to shut down the town's decision-making ability.
5	3a	"Lights, Camera, Invasion"	Alexis Barroso	Andrew Nicholls & Darrell Vickers	November 14, 2015
When the Kemii realize that humans don't fear actors playing aliens, they prepare to shoot a fake movie in Cucurtown starring the leader of the actual invasion team.
6	3b	"River of Esmerelda"	Alexis Barroso	Andrew Nicholls & Darrell Vickers	November 14, 2015
Teresa plans to call down an invasion during the finale of a popular TV telenovela, during which all of Cucurtown will be inside, watching.
7	4a	"Lost City of Kemii Rodor"	Alexis Barroso	Andrew Nicholls & Darrell Vickers	November 21, 2015
Pixel may have discovered the Lost City Of Kemii-Rodor, left on Earth by The Ancient Ones, disguised as a stone.
8	4b	"Saving Goliath"	Alexis Barroso	Andrew Nicholls & Darrell Vickers	November 21, 2015
The discovery that Teresa is fed up with Goliath's incompetence causes celebration at Team Alien HQ, until they realize any replacement would be better for Teresa and worse for them.
9	5a	"League of the Unpopular Scientists"	Alexis Barroso	Andrew Nicholls & Darrell Vickers	November 28, 2015
Teresa plans to have omnivorous alien Volgoths eat everyone's mobile phones so Cucurtown will be cut off from the world - which requires tricking Simon, who has a special talent which could ruin her plot, into leaving town.
10	5b	"Test of Nerves"	Alexis Barroso	Andrew Nicholls & Darrell Vickers	November 28, 2015
If Simon can't overcome his paralyzing fear of tests in time to renew his driver's license, Team Alien will be grounded. So Teresa enacts a plan to ensure Simon will have the worst road-test ever.
11	6a	"Extreme Camping"	Alexis Barroso	Andrew Nicholls & Darrell Vickers	December 5, 2015
When Victor gets the wrong survival package for his Extreme Camping club - a ladder, a cookie jar and some marbles - the "outdoor endurance contest" between Max and Teresa gets seriously weird.
12	6b	"To Tell The Truth"	Alexis Barroso	Andrew Nicholls & Darrell Vickers	December 5, 2015
The discovery that small lies help humans to get along comes as a major revelation for the Kemii, who decides to see what would happen to society if everyone suddenly began telling the truth.
13	7a	"Violet's Diary"	Alexis Barroso	Andrew Nicholls & Darrell Vickers	December 12, 2015
Violet loses her top secret diary - which wouldn't be a problem if she hadn't written the Emergency Destruct Code for Team Alien headquarters inside it - and if Teresa hadn't discovered that it was missing.
14	7b	"Clone Training Day"	Alexis Barroso	Andrew Nicholls & Darrell Vickers	December 12, 2015
Max and Pixel look after a vacationing friend's poodle to prove to their parents that they can be responsible with a pet, but Teresa clones the dog and begins training an army of pet-servants she can place inside every home.
15	8a	"Paranoia"	Alexis Barroso	Andrew Nicholls & Darrell Vickers	December 19, 2015
Solar flares have blocked the Kemiis' communication with the mothership, so Teresa and Goliath decide to go on vacation. Convinced the aliens' inactivity is a trick, Max and Team Alien go on high alert, raising their level of paranoia.
16	8b	"Mirror Mirror"	Alexis Barroso	Andrew Nicholls & Darrell Vickers	December 19, 2015
Teresa plans to lure Max and Violet through an alien mirror-portal, then smash it, locking the humans on the other side. But when Teresa falls through the mirror too, all three are trapped together in backwards-Cucurtown.
17	9a	"Monster Grow"	Alexis Barroso	Andrew Nicholls & Darrell Vickers	December 26, 2015
Due to a new fertilizer, Teresa grows till she can't fit in the house, but Max and Team Alien believe it's a plot to grow enormous and stomp the town flat - despite Goliath's desperate pleas that they help him figure out what's wrong with her.
18	9b	"The Girl Who Cried Alien"	Alexis Barroso	Andrew Nicholls & Darrell Vickers	December 26, 2015
On the principal that the Boy Who Cried Wolf was eventually ignored, Teresa reports false UFO sightings all over Cucurtown to lure the townspeople into complacency before the real attack.
19	10a	"The Flamulards"	Alexis Barroso	Andrew Nicholls & Darrell Vickers	January 2, 2016
After Pixel describes an alien abduction he "remembers" from two years ago, Teresa radios for an immediate pickup from Earth. The aliens whom Pixel says are returning this week are Teresa and Goliath's mortal enemies the Flamulards.
20	10b	"Some Assembly Required"	Alexis Barroso	Andrew Nicholls & Darrell Vickers	January 2, 2016
When the Kemii mothership sends Teresa a complicated weapon that will need at least a week to assemble, she decides to enter it in the school Science Fair and annihilate two birds with one stone.
21	11a	"Have a Lousy Birthday"	Alexis Barroso	Andrew Nicholls & Darrell Vickers	January 9, 2016
As their mutual birthdays approach, Max and Teresa each plot to ruin each other's day by destroying their most valued treasures; Teresa's Crown Of Earth Domination, and Max's stuffed doggy, Mr. Woof.
22	11b	"Pixel Popularity"	Alexis Barroso	Andrew Nicholls & Darrell Vickers	January 9, 2016
With no time for work due to social commitments, Teresa transforms Pixel into an amazing musical performer to get her admirers off her back. But, adored by all, superstar Pixel becomes annoying to everyone.
23	12a	"Jealousy"	Alexis Barroso	Andrew Nicholls & Darrell Vickers	January 16, 2016
When Teresa learns about the incapacitating power of human jealousy, she arranges for Pixel to innocently win three things - a spelling bee, a basketball contest and a rare comic - to make the other members of Team Alien so jealous.
24	12b	"Toddy to the Rescue"	Alexis Barroso	Andrew Nicholls & Darrell Vickers	January 16, 2016
Pixel's biggest fan, 6-year-old Toddy Munson, insists on helping Team Alien any way he can - which becomes a more destructive distraction for their human enemies than the Kemii could ever have dreamed of.
25	13a	"The Spy Who Loathed Me"	Alexis Barroso	Andrew Nicholls & Darrell Vickers	January 23, 2016
Team Alien and the Kemii both want to stop a local construction project, but Teresa can't bring herself to help her enemies. So she creates the shadowy Agent X, to leak valuable "inside information" to gullible Pixel.
26	13b	"O Christmas Tree"	Alexis Barroso	Andrew Nicholls & Darrell Vickers	January 23, 2016
As Christmas approaches, Teresa introduces evil hypnotic Klunder Beasts, which resemble glowing Christmas trees, into every home in town.
27	14a	"Headless Pierre"	Alexis Barroso	Andrew Nicholls & Darrell Vickers	January 30, 2016
Teresa uses the chilling effect of a scary local legend to work in the school at night undisturbed, until Victor sneaks in to face his longstanding fear of Headless Pierre - and Max, Pixel, all thinking they're in the school alone.
28	14b	"Muy Loco"	Alexis Barroso	Andrew Nicholls & Darrell Vickers	January 30, 2016
The winner of the Muy Loco Fruit Drink skateboard contest wins a Golden Helmet, which Teresa mistakenly thinks has amazing powers. She enters Goliath, so Max and Pixel undergo grueling half-pipe training with skateboard legend Ji-Hun.
29	15a	"Cold War"	Alexis Barroso	Andrew Nicholls & Darrell Vickers	February 6, 2016
When the Kemii learn that humans with head colds are useless to fight an invasion - or even to get off the couch - they build a statue of a giant nose, designed to sneeze cold germs over the town at the unveiling.
30	15b	"Mindswap"	Alexis Barroso	Andrew Nicholls & Darrell Vickers	February 6, 2016
Teresa's plot to put Goliath's mind in Max's body backfires and Max, Goliath and Moonbeam all end up with their brains inside the wrong bodies.
31	16a	"To Sleep Perchance to Invade"	Alexis Barroso	Andrew Nicholls & Darrell Vickers	February 13, 2016
When Teresa's dream-projector puts a dream of peaceful surrender into the heads of every sleeping human in town, the only way Team Alien can fight her is to go into the dream themselves.
32	16b	"Cook & Conquer"	Alexis Barroso	Andrew Nicholls & Darrell Vickers	February 13, 2016
The aliens learn that humans like big, cheap food, so they start a new restaurant to bloat everyone in Cucurtown into overfed exhaustion.
33	17a	"Pumpkin News"	Alexis Barroso	Andrew Nicholls & Darrell Vickers	February 20, 2016
Teresa becomes Cucurtown's "most trusted newscaster," and uses her trusted position to broadcast a lie that will hasten the invasion.
34	17b	"The Treasure of Sewer Madre"	Alexis Barroso	Andrew Nicholls & Darrell Vickers	February 20, 2016
Teresa starts a rumor that there's pirate gold buried in the town's sewers. But when she calls-in the alien invasion, the gold-crazy townspeople won't come out to be conquered.
35	18a	"Grounding Max"	Alexis Barroso	Andrew Nicholls & Darrell Vickers	February 27, 2016
When Max is entrusted with a valuable crystal trophy, Teresa plots to get him grounded for life by smashing it to pieces while it's in his possession.
36	18b	"Progress Report"	Alexis Barroso	Andrew Nicholls & Darrell Vickers	February 27, 2016
Horrified that her First Year Progress Report is unfavorable, Teresa narrates an indignant summary for her alien bosses of everything she's accomplished since the aliens' arrival on Earth.
37	19a	"The Musical Meteor"	Alexis Barroso	Andrew Nicholls & Darrell Vickers	March 5, 2016
Teresa uses a rare Euterpium meteor to turn everyone in Cucurtown into carefree singing slave-gardeners, but her plot backfires when she and Goliath come under the meteor's powerful singing-dancing influence themselves.
38	19b	"Mister Stinker"	Alexis Barroso	Andrew Nicholls & Darrell Vickers	March 5, 2016
When Goliath gets childishly enamored of a ventriloquist dummy that Simon has wired for sound, Team Alien believe they have him under their control - until a malfunction makes the dummy receive random radio broadcasts.
39	20a	"Voodoo Zombie Max"	Alexis Barroso	Andrew Nicholls & Darrell Vickers	March 12, 2016
Teresa turns Max into a Voodoo Zombie following her every order - but forgets to command him not to mindlessly obey everyone else he runs into.
40	20b	"Wanted! Robot Arm!"	Alexis Barroso	Andrew Nicholls & Darrell Vickers	March 12, 2016
Max and his friends celebrate the fact that the police have impounded a broken Kemii robot arm - finally, there's indisputable proof of alien technology on earth. But the disembodied arm still has a surprise up its sleeve.
41	21a	"Victor Mystery"	Alexis Barroso	Andrew Nicholls & Darrell Vickers	March 19, 2016
Max thinks Take Your Child To Work Day is going to be boring, until he comes across alarming evidence that his father is actually a top-secret operative with amazing equipment and powers.
42	21b	"Mutant Squirrel"	Alexis Barroso	Andrew Nicholls & Darrell Vickers	March 19, 2016
A Kemii bio-energizing beam meant to replenish Cucurtown's soil accidentally mutates a squirrel and a worm into a deranged Squirrel-Worm Beast bent on undermining the entire town.
43	22a	"Young Simon Says"	Alexis Barroso	Andrew Nicholls & Darrell Vickers	March 26, 2016
Teresa has a brilliant idea for fighting Simon: bring his happy, popular 12-year-old self here from the past and show him what he risks becoming due to his unhealthy preoccupation with aliens.
44	22b	"Pixel & Teresa Date"	Alexis Barroso	Andrew Nicholls & Darrell Vickers	March 26, 2016
Pixel wins a date with Teresa in a charity auction, then scrambles to win the high amount he bid, while Teresa does everything she can to keep him from getting it.
45	23a	"The Xismarth Device"	Alexis Barroso	Andrew Nicholls & Darrell Vickers	April 2, 2016
The mothership sends Teresa an alien weapon of unknown powers to test. Afraid it might be booby-trapped, she arranges for Team Alien to "steal" the possibly dangerous device and test it for her.
46	23b	"The Lemuel Frequency"	Alexis Barroso	Andrew Nicholls & Darrell Vickers	April 2, 2016
Teresa decides if she can somehow infect everyone with the bad luck of Max's clumsy schoolmate Lemuel, the Earth can be easily conquered while all the humans are tripping over their own feet.
47	24a	"A Day in the Life of Teresa"	Alexis Barroso	Andrew Nicholls & Darrell Vickers	April 9, 2016
Max decides to trap Teresa in her own lies by volunteering her as the subject of a documentary TV series telling "true emotional stories about remarkable human beings."
48	24b	"Chicken Chase"	Alexis Barroso	Andrew Nicholls & Darrell Vickers	April 9, 2016
The Kemii finally collect a critical mass of the cloning molecule Multiplonium. But Goliath's chicken gobbles it all up, mistaking it for corn, then goes on the run and clones into 2, then 4, 8, 16 - complicating Teresa's plans to catch it.
49	25a	"Babysitting Goliath"	Alexis Barroso	Andrew Nicholls & Darrell Vickers	April 16, 2016
When Max is left alone with Goliath and their babysitter, Teresa gives him three simple rules: don't let Goliath hear organ music, smell "chicken smoke," or see the full moon through food, or there'll be terrible consequences.
50	25b	"The Maltese Chicken"	Alexis Barroso	Andrew Nicholls & Darrell Vickers	April 16, 2016
When the school mascot, a golden chicken statue, goes missing, with Max as the only suspect, Police Officer Dorcas becomes a Sam-Spade-like sleuth, chasing down confusing clues as Max fights to clear his name.
51	26a	"Unhappy Halloween"	Alexis Barroso	Andrew Nicholls & Darrell Vickers	April 23, 2016
Teresa enlists several Kemoon Warriors to spread terror throughout the Earth on Halloween. But Pixel unwittingly borrows the pumpkin-like aliens for a decoration project and they come to life inside Garden Planet at night.
52	26b	"Forget Yourself"	Alexis Barroso	Andrew Nicholls & Darrell Vickers	April 23, 2016
Teresa builds an army of Kemii-bees to use against the humans, but gets electrocuted and loses her memory and identity, just as the evil, powerful robot bees go on a rampage against humans and aliens alike.

== Broadcast ==
In the United States, Pumpkin Reports debuted alongside the launch of Primo TV on January 16, 2017.
