= Aunt Louisa's Bible Picture Book =

1887 book by Laura Valentine

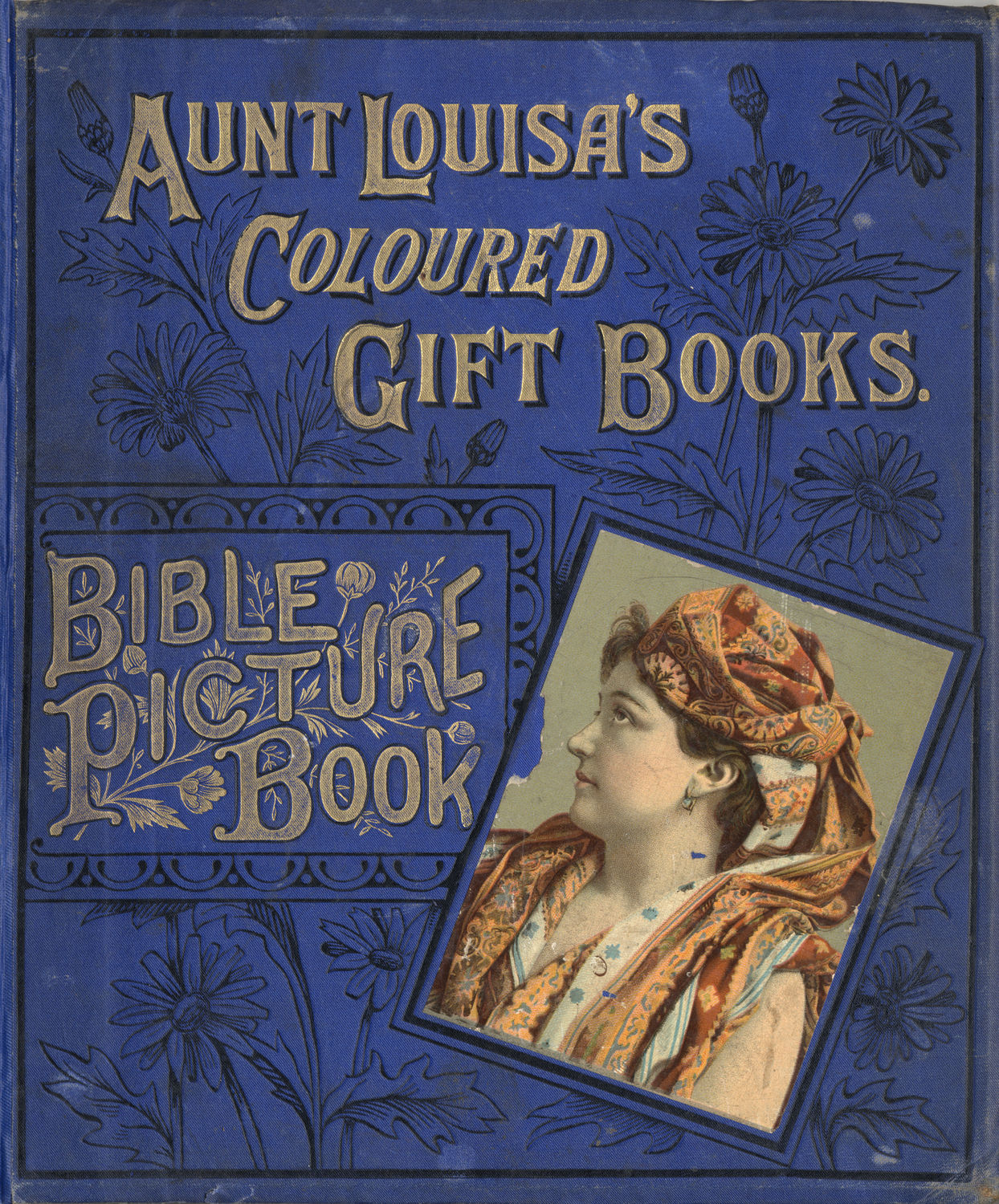
- Book cover
- Author: Laura Valentine
- Language: English
- Publisher: Frederick Warne & Co. (London)
- Publication date: 1887
- Publication place: United Kingdom
- Media type: Print

Aunt Louisa's Bible Picture Book is a book by Laura Valentine released in 1887 and containing stories like "The Story of King David", "Joseph and His Brethren" and "Wonders of Providence".
