= List of The Country Mouse and the City Mouse Adventures episodes =

HBO's children animated TV series The Country Mouse and the City Mouse Adventures had two seasons, each with 26 episodes, totaling 52 episodes aired between March 1, 1998, and October 27, 1999. The following list informs the number, title, plot location and airing date of each episode. In this list, a plot summary is also included in most but not all episodes.

== Series overview ==
Season	Episodes	Originally released	
Season	Episodes	First released	Last released
1	26	March 1, 1998	May 30, 1998
2	26	March 21, 1999	October 27, 1999

== Episodes ==
=== Season 1 (1998) ===
This season used traditional cel-animation, and was produced in 1997 and aired in 1998.

No. overall	No. in season	Title	Location	Original release date
1	1	"The Mouse-tache Marauder"	France	March 1, 1998
Someone is painting mustaches on the famous paintings in the Louvre. Emily and Alexander must find out who is responsible before the museum reopens.
2	2	"The Case of the Disappearing Diamond"	United Kingdom	March 7, 1998
3	3	"Strauss Maus"	Germany	March 8, 1998
Emily and Alexander must find Richard Strauss' missing music before the premiere of his latest symphony.
4	4	"Those Amazing Mice in Their Flying Machines"	England and France	March 14, 1998
Emily and Alexander witness the first air race from London, England to Paris, France.
5	5	"Frisco Rumble"	California, United States	March 15, 1998
Jeanie's father has been wrongfully arrested for theft of money, but with the aid of Emily, Alexander and Ernestine, she convinces the police officer and the sergeant that he is innocent and they have him released before the jail is destroyed by an earthquake.
6	6	"To Catch a Tiger by the Tail"	India	March 21, 1998
Sarita takes Emily, Alexander and their Indian cousin, Bahjay, to the jungle to rescue some captured animals from a poacher called Sam McBean. Asura, a Bengal tiger, seeks their help to find her lost cub, but is caught by McBean. The mice and Sarita find the cub, release Asura and pursue McBean.
7	7	"Mouse-o-taur"	Greece	March 22, 1998
While visiting Crete, Emily and Alexander investigate what appears to be the mythical Minotaur haunting the Labyrinth.
8	8	"Adventure on the Orient Express"	Italy	March 28, 1998
While taking a trip on the Orient Express, Emily and Alexander have to stop a conductor from getting away with a set of jewels from a wealthy woman.
9	9	"Swiss Chocolate Mouse"	Switzerland	March 29, 1998
While visiting their cousin Heidi in Switzerland, Emily and Alexander try to stop a duo of thieves who steal all the chocolate at a tasting contest to melt down as a coating for stolen gold coins.
10	10	"Mice on Ice"	Canada	April 4, 1998
Emily, Alexander and their cousin Powhuktuk travel to a village suffering food shortage and meet twins Katelo and Nuljalik. The mice and the twins make their own trip to follow Tanugeak, braving the dangers along the way. The twins then save Tanugeak from being stranded and find a ship full of food.
11	11	"The Great Yeti Adventure"	Tibet	April 5, 1998
Alexander, Emily and their cousin Jamyang go mountain climbing to meet Bhanti. Bhanti's father is helping the evil Marnak to find the legendary Yeti. The mice and Bhanti find the Yeti before Marnak does. The mice and Bhanti then prevent Marnak from showing off the Yeti. Also, the mice are attacked by a snow leopard.
12	12	"A Mouse-vellous Treasure Hunt"	Mexico	April 11, 1998
Alexander and Emily meet their cousin Carlos and his friend, Maria. Maria's father is seeking the treasure of the sunken San Gallente to pay his debts. The mice and Maria dive down to race greedy Barton to the treasure. Using a makeshift submarine, the mice dispose of Barton and locate the lost treasure.
13	13	"Imperial Mice on China"	China	April 12, 1998
It is the Year of the Rat. Emily and Alexander meet their cousin Wu-Sing and his friend, Emperor Pu-Ying. Notail Nogoodnik has kidnapped the mouse Emperor, Fu-Mouse-Chu, and is impersonating him to hoard citizens' goods. The mice rescue Fu-Mouse-Chu, unmask Notail and prevent him from pilfering the goods.
14	14	"Yen for Trouble"	Japan	April 18, 1998
Emily and Alexander's cousin Fumi introduce them to her friend, Kiko, who is having problems with rats stealing her father's silk from his shop. Some silk is due to be taken to the local emperor for his daughter, Mitsumi. By accident, the mice create for Mitsumi painted silk, perfect for her kimono.
15	15	"Mousecovites"	Russia	April 19, 1998
Emily and Alexander rush to their cousin, Ivan Ivanich. A number of thefts at the Moscow Circus is about to make both that circus and the Mousecovite Circus close down. The mice find out that Ivan's friend, Sasha, is forced by the ringmaster to commit the thefts. The mice and Sasha lead the ringmaster to the police inspector.
16	16	"Vaudeville Mice"	New York City, United States	April 20, 1998
Emily and Alexander see their uncle Satchey. The Oxodrome Theatre is losing business and the singing talent of Satchey's friend, Benny, is getting nowhere. In addition, saboteurs kidnap Benny's father, Harry. The mice and Benny follow them and manage to thwart them from robbing a bank and rescue both Harry and the theatre.
17	17	"Outback Down Under (aka Down Under)"	Australia	April 26, 1998
Alexander and Emily make their way to a farm with their cousin Gemima. Their friend, Amy, runs away with her horse, Nicholas, thinking her father is replacing the horse with an automobile. The mice, with the help of Blister, follow Amy and rescue her from a pack of dingoes with the aid of Uncle Arthur. Then they proceed to rescue Amy's parents from the desert.
18	18	"Zeppelins Away!"	Germany	May 2, 1998
Alexander and Emily visit their cousin Fritz and his friend, Leni. Leni takes the mice to ride her grandfather, Count Zeppelin's new airship invention. The airship works fine, but the count's assistant, Zsolt, steals the plans and destroys both airships, everyone else managing to escape safely from the latter.
19	19	"The Mystery of the Mouse Pharaoh's Tomb"	Egypt	May 3, 1998
Emily and Alexander visit their cousin Anwar on an archeology dig. Together, they must solve the riddle of the missing hieroglyphics and find the tomb of the Pharaoh Kamose before the water from the Aswan dam buries the tomb underwater forever.
20	20	"The Ghost of Castle MacKenzie"	Scotland	May 9, 1998
Emily and Alexander go with their cousin Angus to Castle MacKenzie, where ghosts and a treasure are around. The MacKenzies are on the verge of moving out of their castle, while No-Tail No-Goodnik joins the MacRats. The mice find the treasure and the feud between the castle clans ends.
21	21	"No Mouse Is an Island"	Galápagos Islands	May 10, 1998
Alexander, Emily, their cousin Sonja and their friend, Paulo, are caught in a storm and taken by pirates, seeking Big Jim Tin's treasure. As Paulo assists the pirates to find it, the mice ride after them. With the help of a tortoise, the mice get the treasure, save Paulo and scare away the pirates.
22	22	"Diamond Safari"	Africa	May 16, 1998
Cousin Sue takes Alexander and Emily to see her friend, Tumaini, who is mocked for being tall. A greedy diamond miner, DeClerk is intent on blasting Dark Mountain, where Tumaini has run off to. With help from a bat (the species is currently unknown) named Bungo, the mice rescue Tumaini and all together they put a stop to DeClerk.
23	23	"Arabian Tails"	Iraq	May 17, 1998
Alexander, Emily, their cousin Siri and her friend, Abdul, are desperate for water, but Abdul's hypnosis on Alexander causes him to steal the other camp's water and point the finger on Abdul. The mice and Abdul follow an ancient trail to the Babylonian hanging gardens, where water is plentiful.
24	24	"Klondike Mice"	Canada	May 23, 1998
Emily and Alexander visit their cousin Ned and his friend, Danny, in the middle of the Gold Rush. Ned and Danny have some of their own gold hunting to do, but are both conned by Soapy Smith and Notail Nogoodnik. Danny and the mice follow them and befriend a Kodiak bear cub. Together, they stop the con men and find their gold sources.
25	25	"All I Want for Christmouse"	Finland	May 24, 1998
A Scrooge-esque villain steals Santa's reindeer (accurately now caribou) in an effort to ruin Christmas so that people would buy his toys.
26	26	"Matador Mice"	Spain	May 30, 1998
While visiting their cousin Carmen, Emily and Alexander have to help a little girl save her father from the dangerous bull fightings, as well as save her gentle bull from competing.

=== Season 2 (1999) ===
This season used digital ink and paint, and was produced in 1998 and aired in 1999.

No. overall	No. in season	Title	Location	Original release date
27	1	"Bicycle Mice"	France	March 21, 1999
While visiting their cousin Renaud, Emily and Alexander get wound up in a bicycle race across France and having to deal with a greedy banker who wants Gaston's friend vineyard and Notail Nogoodnik who has stolen Gaston's experimental bike, both willing to use treachery and sabotage to get what they want.
28	2	"Ballet Mice"	Russia	March 22, 1999
Emily and Alexander are at the Imperial School of Ballet in Russia. Anna Pavlova, an up and coming ballerina, is sabotaged by her best friend and Emily and Alexander have to help her before the auditions for the ballet school are over and her dreams ruined.
29	3	"Mouse in the Mayan Moon"	Mexico	March 23, 1999
Emily and Alexander meet up with cousin Xoc and his friend Wendy, who are accompanying Wendy's father, Livingston Thompson, on an archaeological expedition to a Mayan temple, but when No-Tail No-Goodnik (whose after the Jade Jaguar) kidnaps Emily and fools the Mayan mice into thinking he's a shaman, it's up to Alexander to save his cousin with a charade of his own.
30	4	"Meatball Mice"	Italy	March 24, 1999
Emily and Alexander travel to Venice to meet cousin Mario and his friend Benedetta. When Benedetta’s secret family recipe is stolen, Emily, Alexander and Mario help Benedetta’s family to win a cooking contest.
31	5	"Jungle Mice"	Congo	March 25, 1999
Emily and Alexander join cousin Tio and his friend Sugita in accompanying famous explorer Mary Kingsley on her safari through the Congo. It's not long before the independent-thinking Mary runs into trouble and to top it off, the group stumbles on a lumber operation by Mowdown Mack, whose out to capture an albino gorilla.
32	6	"POSH Mice"	Atlantic Ocean	March 26, 1999
While on a cruise ship to America, Emily and Alexander must stop a greedy steward from cheating a boy and his father out of their money and immigration papers, to make them out to be stowaways.
33	7	"Marconi Mice"	Newfoundland, Canada	March 27, 1999
Emily and Alexander must help ensure that the first wireless telegraph goes smoothly with the inventor's assistant secretly sabotaging the effort, feeling that his boss didn't give him enough credit.
34	8	"Cinematic Mice"	France	March 28, 1999
Emily and Alexander arrive in France in time to join cousin Monique and her friend Renee Lumiere for the premiere of Renee's uncles' moving picture film, but somebody seems determined to wreck the Lumiere Brothers' premiere and somebody appearing in the play "The Count Of Monte Cristo", scheduled to take place in the same theater the Lumiere Brothers' film is being shown, becomes a likely suspect.
35	9	"Sherlock Mouse"	United Kingdom	March 29, 1999
While visiting their cousin Sherlock, Emily and Alexander must solve the case of the missing manuscript for Arthur Conan Doyle's latest novel, The Hound of the Baskervilles.
36	10	"Solid Gold Mouse"	Bali, Indonesia	March 30, 1999
Emily and Alexander meet up with cousin Musi and her friend Dhanu to see Dhanu perform a traditional Balinese dance to outsiders, but No-Tail No-Goodnik arrives at the same time and steals Dhanu's golden headdress and the valuables of Musi's mice friends' costumes. With Emily covering for Musi, Alexander and Musi have to get back the stolen trinkets in time for the dance...and will need help from a royal cat.
37	11	"Panama Mouse"	Panama	March 31, 1999
A few days before the opening of the Panama Canal, Emily and Alexander join up with cousin Pedro and his friend Willy, an American tourist. However, the last stages of the project are being plagued by thefts and monster calls. Even though the culprit behind the monster calls is found out, the mice discover No-Tail No-Goodnik is behind the thefts of the workers and, along with another rat, intending to swindle a Panama mice village (that's moving out for the canal) out of their valuables.
38	12	"Three Mice and You're Out"	Massachusetts, United States	April 1, 1999
On the day of the first World Series, Emily and Alexander travel to Boston to meet up with cousin Casey and his friend Joey, son of the Boston team's star player, Fast Ball McFall. The day, however, is not met without sabotage on two fronts: the coach of the Pittsburgh team stealing McFall's lucky four-leaf clover to throw off McFall's confidence and No-Tail No-Goodnik joining the rat baseball team with the intent of throwing off the mice baseball team's game and scoring a big wheel of cheese.
39	13	"Wild West Mice"	New York City, United States	April 2, 1999
Emily and Alexander go to watch Buffalo Bill's Wild West, where they meet their cousin Annie. Buffalo Bill's medal of honour get mysteriously stolen. Emily, Alexander and Annie follow a trail to Monterey Jack (actually No-Tail Nogoodnik) and Annie challenges him to get the medal back.
40	14	"White House Mouse"	Washington, D.C., United States	October 15, 1999
Emily and Alexander go down to Washington DC to visit cousin Archie and his friend Teddy Roosevelt Jr., son of President Teddy Roosevelt, for the 4th of July parade. The preparations hit a snag when the President's horse Cyclone disappears, a mysterious figure accompanies an old friend of the President, and No-Tail No-Goodnik has his greedy little eyes on Cyclone's golden horseshoes.
41	15	"Houdini Mouse"	Hungary	October 16, 1999
Harry Houdini's act are secretly being sabotaged by a rival, who is determined to make sure that Houdini doesn't get out of his stunts alive.
42	16	"The Big Cheese"	Netherlands	October 17, 1999
Emily and Alexander arrive in the Netherlands to see cousin Miep and her friend Princess Wilhemina, who is to be crowned the new Queen of the Netherlands. The timing of the mice's arrival couldn't have come at a worse time: the cheese has been tasting too salty lately, and the mice stumble upon No-Tail No-Goodnik's plan to sell good cheese at very expensive prices to the Dutch mice in the nearby mice village, who Wilhemina has good connections with.
43	17	"World's Fair Mice"	St. Louis, United States	October 18, 1999
Emily and Alexander arrive in St. Louis to see cousin Josephine and her friend Harriet, who are accompanying George Washington Carver to the World's Fair being held in St. Louis. Josephine's strong taste buds come in handy when it's discovered that Professor Waldo, Carver's rival, has switched the peanut butter with his bad-tasting walnut spread.
44	18	"Hong Kong Mice"	Hong Kong, China	October 19, 1999
Emily and Alexander come to Hong Kong to see cousin Jaow-Young and his friend Yin, who are both taking part in the Dragon Boat Races. The mice are quick to catch on to trouble going afoot when Yin's father's rival makes plans to sabotage Yin's father's Dragon Boat, but they'll have to work fast if they're to save the day as well as make it to the Mice and Rats' Dragon Boat Race in time.
45	19	"High Flying Hi-Jinks"	North Carolina, United States	October 20, 1999
Emily and Alexander make it down to Kitty Hawk to visit cousin Charlotte and her friend Johnny and to witness history in the making: the first flight of the Wright Brothers' airplane and the first flight of Charlotte's mouse-built airplane. The Wright Brothers' chance to make history might get ruined when two vital parts of their plane go missing and the owner of a bird sanctuary is the likely suspect.
46	20	"Siamese Mice"	Thailand	October 21, 1999
Emily and Alexander arrive in Thailand to visit cousin Choi and her friend Trang, in time for the coronation of the Prince of Siam. When No-Tail No-Goodnik swipes the Prince's prized possession, the Star of Siam, Trang gets the blame for the theft and the mice must find the Star of Siam and clear Trang's name...with a little help from Trang's elephant, Chai Chai.
47	21	"Down Under Plunder (aka New Zealand Mice)"	New Zealand	October 22, 1999
Emily and Alexander decide to help out the women of New Zealand gain their right to vote. The only problem is that the only man left to give his vote is the chief of the native tribes deep in the jungle and the polls are closing fast.
48	22	"When Irish Mice Are Smiling"	Ireland	October 23, 1999
Emily and Alexander arrive in Ireland to visit cousin O'Reilly and his friend Rory, as well as settle Alexander's inheritance of a place called Blarney Castle. The visit doesn't include the addition of No-Tail No-Goodnik, who is after a pot of gold at the end of the rainbow and thinks O'Reilly is a real genuine leprechaun, but when No-Tail accidentally starts a fire, it will take some help from the "Little People" to save Rory's grandfather.
49	23	"Teddy Bear Mice"	Germany	October 24, 1999
Emily and Alexander come to Germany to visit cousin Nina and her friend Kirsten in time for the toy fair. The mice soon find themselves in a double mystery when No-Tail No-Goodnik hides some stolen jewels in the prototype of a new toy and Heinz, a spoiled rich boy, steals the same new toy for his own needs.
50	24	"Olympic Mice"	Greece	October 25, 1999
Emily and Alexander arrive in Greece to visit cousin Nikos and his friend Christos, just in time to witness the first International Olympics and the first Mice Olympics. While the mice discover that No-Tail No-Goodnik is trying to cheat his way to the top in the Mice Olympics (with Emily ending up convincing the Mice Olympic Committee to remove a "No Girls" rule for future Olympics), Christos discovers that Spyridon Louis has had his chance of winning the marathon sabotaged by his rival Demetri.
51	25	"North Pole Mice"	Canada	October 26, 1999
Emily and Alexander travel to Canada to visit cousin MacKenzie "Makko" and her friend Tuk, whose father is helping Robert Peary reach the North Pole, but the expedition appears to be lost. The mice go off in search of the Peary Expedition, but when they become lost, it's up to Tuk to follow Makko's map, find the Peary Expedition, and show them the way to the North Pole.
52	26	"Trinidad Mousequerade"	Trinidad and Tobago	October 27, 1999
Emily and Alexander arrive in Trinidad to visit cousin Simonne and her friend Melanie Monbrun in time to participate in a masquerade ball. The celebrations end up getting spoiled when greedy landowner, Mr. Warner, disguises himself as the legendary Midnight Robber to scare Melanie's family off their plantation, just to take hold of an oil well the plantation sits upon, inspiring No-Tail No-Goodnik to dress up as the Midnight Robber as well and rob the Trinidad mice of their valuables.
