= The Country Mouse and the City Mouse Adventures =

- Also known as: The Mouse Adventures (United Kingdom)
- Genre: Adventure; Neo-noir; Mystery
- Based on: The Country Mouse and the City Mouse by Aesop Characters from children book by Random House
- Developed by: Paul Schibli (adaptation)
- Written by: Joseph Mallozzi (season 1); Patrick Granleese; Caroline R. Maria; Bruce Robb
- Voices of: Terrence Scammell; Julie Burroughs; Rick Jones
- Composer: James Gelfand
- Countries of origin: France; Canada
- Original languages: French; English
- No. of seasons: 2
- No. of episodes: 52 (list of episodes)

Production
- Executive producers: Micheline Charest; Ronald A. Weinberg; Christian Davin; Giovanna Milano
- Producer: Cassandra Schafhausen
- Running time: 24 minutes
- Production companies: CINAR Films (Note: Also credited as Mousecapades Productions Inc. for season 2 with HBO provided funding for the show.); France Animation; Ravensburger Film & TV; WIC Entertainment; Reader's Digest (Season 1); Videal (season 1); Motion Pictures, S.A. (season 1)

Original release
- Network: Canal J (France); France 3 (France); TVOntario (Canada, season 1); YTV (Canada); Ici Radio-Canada Télé (Canada); HBO (United States); HBO Family (United States)
- Release: March 1, 1998 – October 27, 1999

Related
- The Country Mouse and the City Mouse: A Christmas Tale

The Country Mouse and the City Mouse Adventures is an animated television series produced by CINAR Films, France Animation, Ravensburger Film & TV, WIC Entertainment, Reader's Digest, TVOntario, Videal, Motion Pictures, S.A., Canal J, and France 3.

The Country Mouse and the City Mouse Adventures aired in the U.S. on HBO (who also provided development funding for the series) from March 1, 1998 to October 27, 1999. It premiered in France on France 3 on March 27, 1998.

== Storyline and basis ==
The show follows the adventures of two cousin mice, Alexander from the city and Emily from the country, who go on adventures around the world in the late 19th and early 20th century, usually to help their cousins, solve a mystery, or stop the evil rat, No-Tail No-Goodnik.

The two main characters originally appeared in the 1993 television special The Country Mouse and the City Mouse: A Christmas Tale, which was produced by Michael Sporn Animation for HBO. Loosely based on the classic Aesop fable, the television special was also adapted into a book in 1994, titled The Country Mouse and the City Mouse: Christmas Is Where the Heart Is. But the characters were modified for the Cinar series.

== Main characters ==
- Emily (voiced by Julie Burroughs) is a female country mouse and Alexander's cousin. She wears a red dress with a white pinafore apron and a straw hat with a red ribbon tied in a bow around it.
- Alexander (voiced by Terrence Scammell) is a male city mouse and Emily's cousin. He wears a blue pinstriped suit with matching hat and a red bowtie.
- No-Tail No-Goodnik (voiced by Rick Jones) is a rat thief with a severed tail, the circumstances of which are never revealed, who is the main antagonist. He goes to some countries to commit thefts and often uses fake tails as a disguise.

== Production ==
The Country Mouse and the City Mouse Adventures was initially produced as a 26-episode series costing US$9 million. Production partners included Germany's Ravensburger; Reader's Digest in the U.S., and Canadian CINAR (now WildBrain), which contributed US$6 million towards the original project's funding.

The show's main characters were first introduced in the 1993 HBO special, The Country Mouse and the City Mouse: A Christmas Tale. It was loosely based on the classic fable by Aesop.

== Telecast and home media ==
The Country Mouse and the City Mouse Adventures aired in the U.S. from March 1, 1998, to October 27, 1999, on HBO (who also provided development funding for the series). Until December 31, 2004, HBO's sister network HBO Family aired repeats of the show. The series premiered in France on France 3 on March 27, 1998, and later on Canal J.

In Canada, it first aired on TVOntario in autumn 1997 and also aired on YTV in 1999. Repeats of the show aired on the Cookie Jar Toons block on This TV until September 23, 2011, and mornings in Ireland on RTÉ Two's The Den, normally at 7:15am. However, all CINAR references in these broadcasts have been replaced by Cookie Jar references, but when Netflix began to stream seasons 1 and 2 on its "watch instantly" streaming service on February 29, 2012, all CINAR references have been restored. It formerly aired on Light TV (now as TheGrio) from December 22, 2016, until October 2, 2020.

Reader's Digest released only the first season on VHS and DVD in the U.S., the United Kingdom, Ireland, France, Germany, Finland and Australia. Direct Source released every four episodes in two DVD volumes from the second season of the show on February 27, 2007. Season 1 is also available on iTunes.

Mill Creek Entertainment released The Country Mouse and the City Mouse Adventures - 26 Mice Tales Around The World on August 4, 2015, on DVD for Region 1. This 2-disc collection features all 26 episodes from the second season on DVD for the very first time. As of 2022, the show is available on Tubi.
