= Aunt Louisa's Oft Told Tales =

1870s book by Laura Valentine

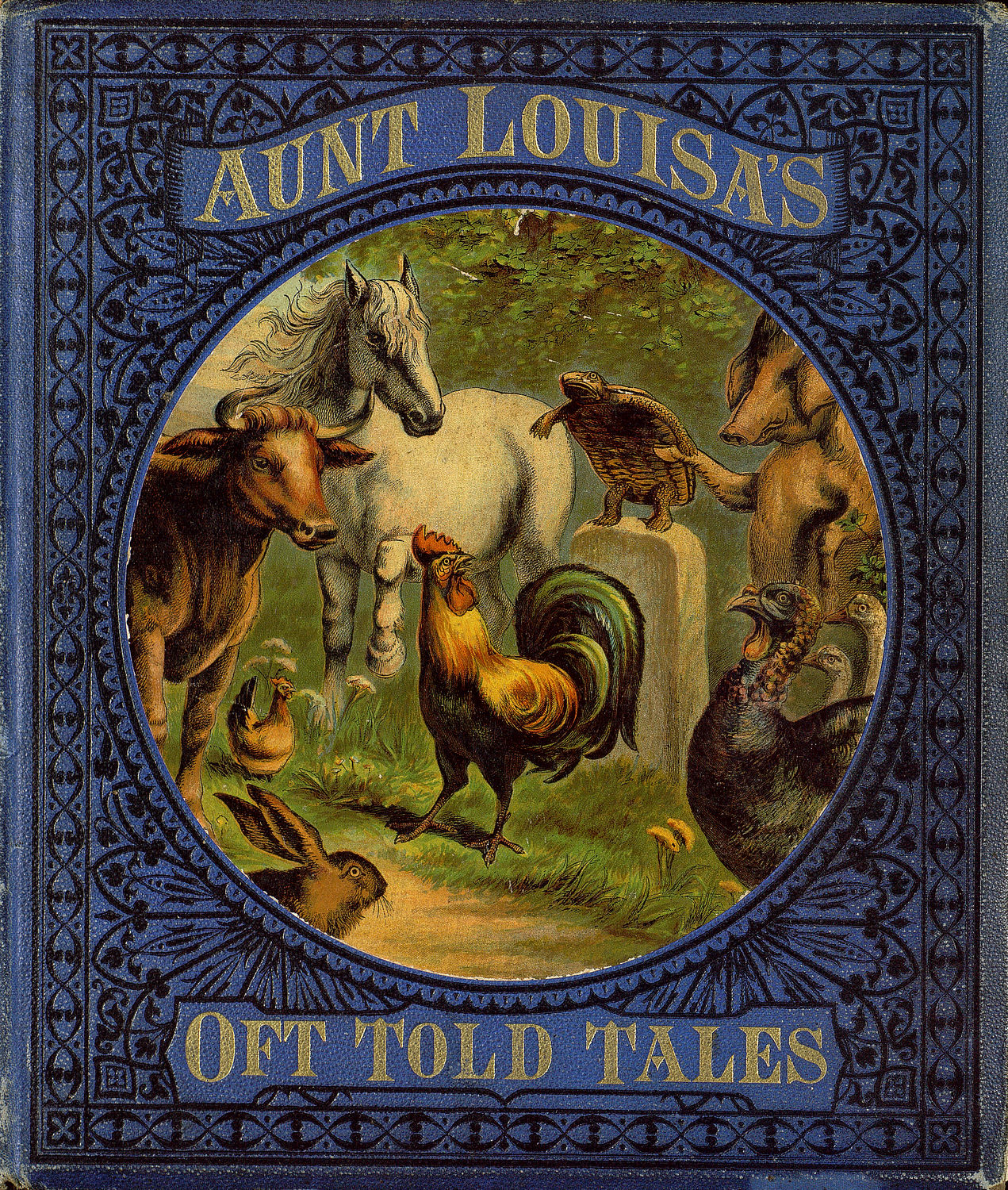
- Book cover
- Author: Laura Valentine
- Language: English
- Publisher: McLoughlin Brothers
- Publication date: 1870s
- Publication place: USA
- Media type: Print

Aunt Louisa's Oft Told Tales is a book by Laura Valentine released in the 1870s and containing an abridged version of Robinson Crusoe as well as "Children in the Wood", "Hare and Tortoise" and other moral fables. Except for the elaborated "new version" of "The Tortoise and the Hare", the retellings are in verse.
