= Laura Valentine =

English writer

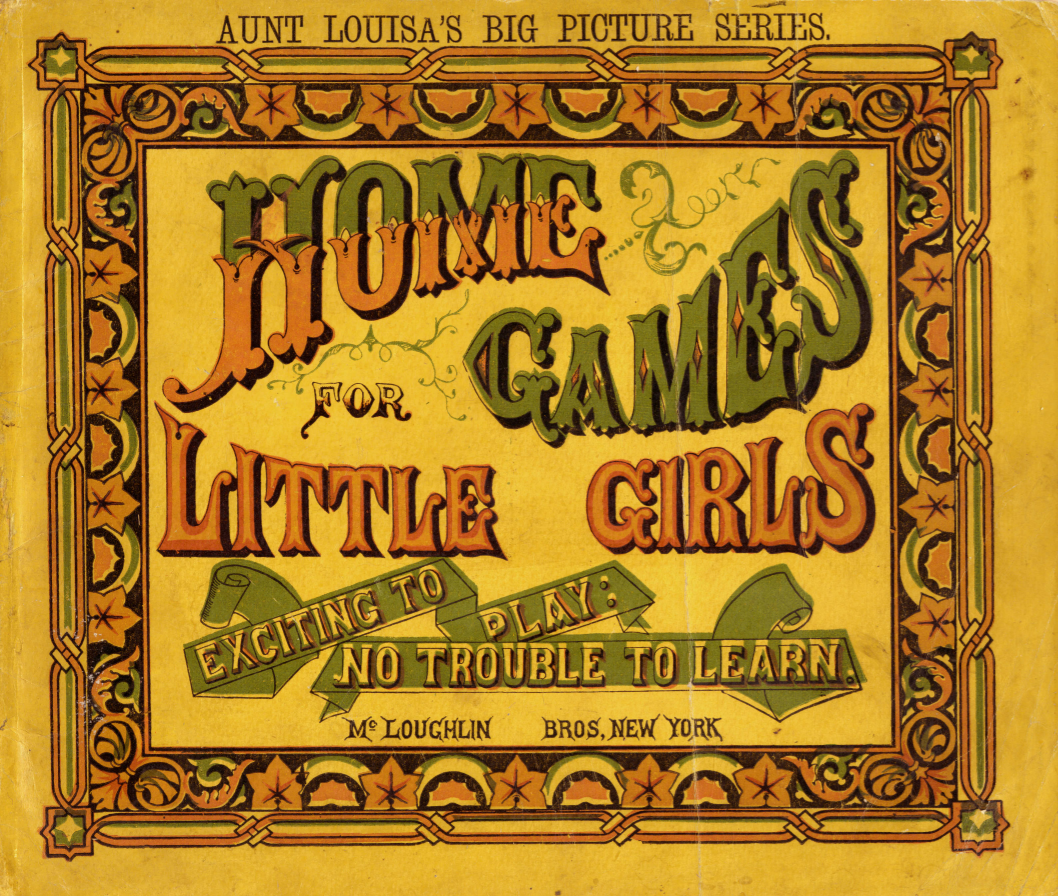
Part of Laura Valentine's Big Picture Series

Laura Belinda Charlotte Jewry (married name Laura Valentine, pen names Mrs. S. Valentine and Aunt Louisa; 1814–1899) was a Victorian English writer primarily known for her children's literature. Her work was often produced in children's series including Aunt Louisa's Toy Books, Aunt Louisa’s Big Picture Series, and The Young Folk's Shakespeare Series.

== Biography ==
Laura Belinda Charlotte Jewry was born at the Victory in England. Her father, Admiral Jewry, served in the English Navy. At an early age, she connected with the Lord Elphinstone family. She spent her maiden life in India till she married Reverend Richard Valentine, a clergyman of the Church of England. Within 12 months of their marriage, she was widowed.

Her literature often was educational, told of travel, or described the London scene. As an adult novelist, Laura Valentine specialized in florid historical romance. Her main novels were Kirkholme Priory (1847), The Vassal (1850), and The Cup and the Lip (1851). Valentine expressed an expertise in Shakespeare, editing "The Works of William Shakespeare" and creating a number of children's versions of Shakespeare plays including The Merchant of Venice and The Tempest. Professionally, Valentine was one of the chief editors of Frederick Warne & Co and the sole editor of Girl's Home Book and The Chandos Classics. Most of Valentine's work was published through Frederick Warne & Co and T. C. Newby.

Valentine died at the age of 84 still an active writer. She was survived only by her sister Mary Jewry for five or six years.

== Bibliography ==
- Beatrice; or, Six Years of Childhood and Youth (William Tegg), 1859
- Nelly, the Gypsy Girl (Routledge, Warne & Routledge), 1860
- The Girl's Own Book; by Mrs. Child; a new edition revised by Mrs. R. Valentine (Miss Laura Jewry) 468 pp. (William Tegg), 1863
- The Knights Ransom (Frederick Warne and Co.), 1870
- Heroism and Adventure. A Book for Boys; edited by Mrs. Valentine (Frederick Warne and Co.), ca. 1870
- Aunt Louisa's London Toy Books: Lily Sweet-Briar's Birthday (Frederick Warne and Co.), ca. 1870
- Aunt Louisa's London Toy Books: Sea-Side (Frederick Warne and Co.), ca. 1870
- Aunt Louisa's London Toy Books: The Birthday Party (Frederick Warne and Co.), ca. 1870
- Aunt Louisa's Nursery Favourite, (Frederick Warne and Co.), ca. 1870
- Aunt Louisa's big picture series: Home games for little girls (McLoughlin Brothers), 1870
- Aunt Louisa's big picture series: Santa Claus and his works (McLoughlin Brothers), 1872
- Uncle Ned's toy books: Play time stories (McLoughlin Bro's), 187?
- Daring and Doing, A Book for Boys (Frederick Warne and Co.), 1874
- Aunt Louisa's Fairy Legends (McLaughlin Brothers), 1875
- Aunt Louisa's London Gift Book (Frederick Warne and Co.), ca. 1875
- Aunt Louisa's Welcome Gift (Frederick Warne and Co.), ca. 1875
- Aunt Louisa's London Toy Books: The Zoological gardens hyænas, stag, jaguar, fox, otter, camel (Frederick Warne and Co.), ca. 1875
- Rhymes for the Little Ones (Frederick Warne & Co.), ca. 1880
- Home and Country Pets (Frederick Warne), ca. 1880s
- World-Wide Fables (McLoughlin Brothers), 1880
- Aunt Louisa's Keepsake (Frederick Warne and Co./Scribner, Welford and Co.), ca. 1880
- Aunt Louisa's comicalities (Frederick Warne & Co.), ca. 1880
- Aunt Louisa's London Toy Books: Hop O'my Thumb (Frederick Warne and Co.), ca. 1880
- Aunt Louisa's Stories of Old (Frederick Warne and Co.), ca. 1890
- Aunt Louisa's First Book for Children (Frederick Warne & Co.), 1902 (Illustrated by Louis Wain and others)
- Eastern Tales by Many Story Tellers (Frederick Warne and Co.), 1902
- Aunt Louisa's Book of Common Things (F. Warne & Co. Ltd), 1920
- Aunt Louisa's Alphabet book (Frederick Warne and Co.)
- Aunt Louisa's Bible Picture Book
- Aunt Louisa's Golden Gift (Frederick Warne and Co.), 1878
- Aunt Louisa's Oft Told Tales (Mcloughlin Bros.) New York, 1875
- Aunt Louisa's Old Nursery Friends
- Aunt Louisa's Sparkling Gems Mcloughlin Bros., 1866
- Aunt Louisa's Wee, Wee Stories Mcloughlin Bros., New York, 1883
- Aunt Louisa's Welcome Guest comprising: My favourites, Rover's dinner party, Our boys and girls (Frederick Warne and Co.), 1886?
- Aunt Louisa's Welcome Visitor comprising New Year's Eve; The kingdom of the greedy; Frisky the Squirrel; Dick Whittington (Frederick Warne and Co.), 187?
- Aunt Louisa's London toy books: Hector the Dog (Frederick Warne & Co.) ca. 1870
- Joe and Ned
- Little Peace
- Robinson Crusoe
- Toto
