= The Country Mouse and the City Mouse: A Christmas Tale =

1993 film by Michael Sporn

- Genre: Drama
- Based on: The Town Mouse and the Country Mouse by Aesop
- Teleplay by: Maxine Fisher
- Directed by: Michael Sporn
- Starring: John Lithgow; Crystal Gayle
- Theme music composer: David Evans
- Country of origin: United States
- Original language: English

Production
- Producer: Michael Sporn
- Running time: 25 minutes
- Production companies: Random House; HBO
- Budget: $265,000

Original release
- Network: HBO
- Release: December 8, 1993

Related
- The Country Mouse and the City Mouse Adventures

The Country Mouse and the City Mouse: A Christmas Tale is an animated TV special produced and directed by Michael Sporn and written by Maxine Fisher, adapted by Tish Rabe. Produced by Michael Sporn Animation, Random House and HBO, it aired on December 8, 1993, as part as the HBO Storybook Musicals series. As the title implies, the story is an adaptation of the Aesop fable, where it was set around Christmastime. The special's two main characters, Emily and Alexander, were voiced respectively by Crystal Gayle and John Lithgow.

In 1994, Random House Children's Media published a children's book titled The Country Mouse and the City Mouse: Christmas Is Where the Heart Is, which was based on the animated special. The book was written by Maxine Fisher and illustrated by Jerry Smath.

The main characters would later appear in the second iteration of Cinar's animated series, The Country Mouse and the City Mouse Adventures, which also aired on HBO.

== Synopsis ==
At the Johnson's farm in the country, a female mouse named Emily, whose existence is known to the two children named Patty and her little brother, Kevin living there, decides to go into the city to visit her cousin Alexander for Christmas. However, the chef the restaurant Alexander lives in has set a variety of anti-mice precautions, thus scaring the two cousins out of the restaurant. The two mice return to the country house to celebrate Christmas together.
