= Motion Pictures, S.A. =

Spanish production and distribution company of audiovisual TV products

Motion Pictures Entertainment
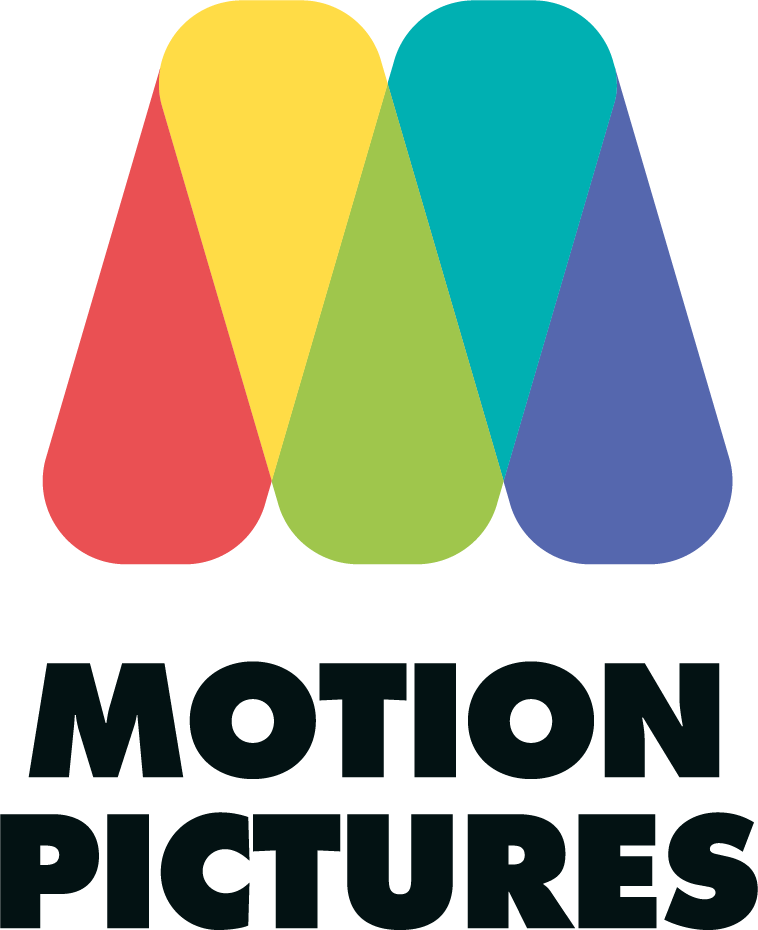
- Industry: Audiovisual
- Founded: 1977; Barcelona, Spain
- Founder: Enrique Uviedo Herrera
- Headquarters: Reina Victoria 8, 08021 Barcelona (Localización de la oficina), Spain
- Area served: Worldwide
- Products: Films, television show, documentary, animation
- Owner: Francisca Fernández Paesa, Enrique Uviedo Herrera
- Number of employees: 20

Motion Pictures Entertainment, S.L. is a Spanish production and distribution company of audiovisual TV products, founded by Enrique Uviedo and established in Barcelona since 1975.

The company has licensed foreign shows in Spain, such as Teenage Mutant Ninja Turtles, and co-produced its own animated series, including two with Walt Disney Television Animation Spain, SA.

Motion Pictures' logo looks very similar to the classic Motown logo, as well the name of the company.

That was remedied with their current logo.

== History ==
The company was founded in 1977 by its president Enrique Uviedo Herrera. The first activities of the company were the production of low-budget films while working in the productions of Italian, American, and British filmmakers who came to shoot in Spain.

In the early 1980s, Motion Pictures began to buy broadcasting rights, primarily video and television. Coinciding with the end of the video boom in the early 1990s, the company began to buy American film catalogs for television distribution, with titles such as Star Wars, The Empire Strikes Back, The Return of the Jedi, Apocalypse Now, and Tucker.

Alongside this films' acquisition policy was resumed the production of Spanish films, including Historias de la puta mili, sold in over forty countries. In addition, a series with the same title was produced for Tele 5, which won the “Ondas” Award in 1995 - Best Fiction Series of the Year.

Motion Pictures has had an extended catalog of animated shows. For more than 20 years, it has brought notable series to Spain, such as Teenage Mutant Ninja Turtles, Inspector Gadget, The Smurfs, Calimero, and Dennis the Menace.

Motion Pictures has heavily invested for the sales of international rights and is now available in international markets such as NATPE, Foorum TV, Los Angeles Screenings, MIPTV, Latin American Screens, and the MIPCOM.

== Produced and co-produced shows ==
Since 2001, Motion Pictures is co-producing its own animated shows that are currently being broadcast around the world:

- Sandokan - (26x26') - A co-production with Rai Fiction in Italy and TVE in Spain.
- Ivanhoe: The King's Knight - (52x26') - A co-production with both France Animation and France 2 in France, CINAR in Canada, and both Ravensburger Film + TV and Videal in Germany.
- Carland Cross - (26x26') - A co-production with Odec Kid Cartoons, TF1 and Canal+ in France.
- Prudence Investigates - (52x26') - A co-production with both TF1 and the Carrere Group in France, SEK Studio in North Korea, and TVE in Spain.
- Raindrop: Water is Adventure - (26x26') - Produced in collaboration with TVE in Spain, TV3 in Catalonia, and TVV in the Valencian Community. It made its debut on TVE in Spain by its audience to be a leader in its time slot. As of today, the show was sold in more than 70 countries.
- LMN´S: Adventures in the Microworld - (52x13') - A co-production with The Animation Band in Italy and Tons of Toons in Spain, in collaboration with TV3 in Catalonia, TVE in Spain, and Rai Fiction in Italy.
- Van Dogh - (104x4') - A CGI-animated series that shows the titular character on getting the drawing right with his magic brush.
- Boom & Reds - (104x4') - Produced in Barcelona, with CGI animation produced by Anera Films, S.A.
- Telmo and Tula: Little Cooks - (52x7') - A CGI-animated series that teaches kids how to bake some food in each episode. Animation produced by Anera Films, S.A. with the participation of The Walt Disney Company of Iberia, S.L.
- Telmo and Tula: Arts and Crafts - (52x7') - A CGI-animated series that teaches kids how to craft some art. Animation produced by Anera Films, S.A. with the participation of The Walt Disney Company of Iberia, S.L.
- The Zumbers - (150x3') - A CGI-animated series that showed the object that corresponded with the amount of 20 balloons a particular animal had to eat its own donuts from those, in order to paint a particular object. Animation produced by Anera Films, S.A.
- Green Light: Traffic Safety (26x5') - An educational CGI-animated series where it teaches kids on how to be safe on the road. Animation produced by Anera Films, S.A.
- Glumpers - (104x2') - A dialog-less slapstick comedy series created by MAKE Studios in co-production with TV3 in Catalonia.
- Pumpkin Reports - (52x13') - A Sci-fi comedy series produced in co-production with both Sample S.r.l. and Rai Fiction in Italy, Young Jump Animation in Malaysia, Clan in Spain, and TV3 in Catalonia.
- Mya Go - (104x5') - A preschool-orientated series produced in co-production with both Piranha Bar and RTEjr in Ireland, Clan in Spain, Super3 in Catalonia, and Gloobinho in Brazil.

== Rainbow Spain ==
Recently, Motion Pictures and Rainbow S.p.A., an Italian animation production studio, announced an agreement that was reached for the establishment of a joint venture in Spain. The head office of Rainbow Spain, is located at the offices of Motion Pictures in Barcelona and also has an office in Madrid. Rainbow Spain is responsible for managing the licensing of TV rights and merchandising of both companies' properties in the Spanish market for the following shows: Winx Club (208x26’), Huntik: Secrets & Seekers (52x26’) and Poppixie (52x13’), among others that are currently in production.
