= Pikwik Pack =

Canadian television series

- Genre: Comedy
- Created by: Frank Falcone; Mary Bredin; Rachel Reade Marcus
- Directed by: Todd Kauffman; Mark Thornton; Yurie Rocha ("Timid Tibor")
- Voices of: Emma Ho; Daniel Pathan; Molly Lewis; Jacob Soley
- Composers: Asher Lenz; Stephen Skratt
- Country of origin: Canada
- Original language: English
- No. of seasons: 1
- No. of episodes: 26 (52 segments)

Production
- Executive producers: Frank Falcone; Rachel Reade Marcus; Kirsten Newlands
- Producer: Colleen McGrath
- Running time: 24 minutes
- Production companies: Guru Studio; Corus Entertainment

Original release
- Network: Treehouse TV
- Release: November 7, 2020 – November 1, 2021

Pikwik Pack is a Canadian animated television series for preschoolers that premiered on Disney Junior on November 7, 2020, in the United States, and on Treehouse TV on December 26 of the same year in Canada. The program was created by Mary Bredin, Frank Falcone and Rachel Reade Marcus, and produced by Corus Entertainment and Guru Studio. The show follows the Pikwik Pack, which consists of leader Suki, and members Axel, Hazel, and Tibor. They live in a town called Pikwik and embark on delivery adventures.

== Premise ==
Pikwik Pack follows a group of four colorful animals: Suki the mint green hedgehog, Axel the blue raccoon, Hazel the orange cat and Tibor the purple hippopotamus. The plot device for each episode revolves around a new package arriving at the Pikwik post office, which the quartet must deliver to a local resident in time, avoiding various obstacles. The package always includes a tag with three diamonds on it that have three different meanings; a red diamond, which notes its recipient(s), a yellow diamond, which gives the package's intended delivery location, and a green diamond, indicating the delivery deadline or how the package should be delivered.

== Characters ==
=== Main ===
- Suki (voiced by Emma Ho) is a small, antropomorphic mint green hedgehog who is the leader of the Pikwik Pack. She is responsible, thoughtful, and always supports her team. Suki's vehicle is a boat.
- Axel (voiced by Daniel Pathan) is a antropomorphic blue raccoon who is funny, fearless, and likes going fast. Axel's vehicle is a truck.
- Hazel (voiced by Molly Lewis) is a antropomorphic small, orange tabby cat who is silly and adventurous, and her favorite food is tacos. Hazel's vehicle is a helicopter.
- Tibor (voiced by Jacob Soley) is a antropomorphic light purple hippopotamus who is strong, reliable and loves to keep things on track. Tibor's vehicle is a train.

== Episodes ==
| No. | Title | Written by | Original release date | Canadian air date | Prod. code | U.S. viewers (millions) |
|---|---|---|---|---|---|---|
| 1 | "Better Together" | S: Jeff Biederman, T: Jiro C. Okada | November 7, 2020 | December 26, 2020 | 104A | 0.37 |
| 1 | "Kip in the Caboose" | S: Jeff Biederman, T: Jiro C. Okada | November 7, 2020 | December 26, 2020 | 104B | 0.37 |
The Pikwik Pack are headed to the Pikwik Carnival to make a delivery for Polly, Peter, and Patrick Polar Bear. Along the way, they try to find rides that are interesting, but they are not enjoying it as much. Tibor finds the taco Axel made for him having an off-putting taste, thus he hides it in the caboose of his train, which attracts their dog Kip, to land in the caboose.
| 2 | "Timid Tibor" | Jeff Biederman | November 7, 2020 | December 27, 2020 | 101A | 0.40 |
| 2 | "Lone Star" | Jeff Biederman | November 7, 2020 | December 27, 2020 | 101B | 0.40 |
Tibor is hydrophobic, and therefore tries to stay dry while delivering a package to Farmer Francis, but he must face his fear when the package almost falls in the water. Axel thinks that he can reach a package recipient who is on the other side of a forest full of obstacles.
| 3 | "Suki's Hero" | Jeff Biederman | November 14, 2020 | January 2, 2021 | 102A | 0.35 |
| 3 | "Shake It Up" | Jeff Biederman | November 14, 2020 | January 2, 2021 | 102B | 0.35 |
While sailing to deliver a package to Captain Kate, Suki tries to imitate her, which leads the Pikwik Pack into trouble. The Pikwik Pack delivers a package in which they have to shake all the way even though they do not have the stamina to do so.
| 4 | "Hazel's Mishap" | Jeff Biederman | November 21, 2020 | January 3, 2021 | 103A | 0.37 |
| 4 | "Axel's Lucky Day" | Jeff Biederman | November 21, 2020 | January 3, 2021 | 103B | 0.37 |
While delivering a package for Beverly Beaver, Hazel keeps on getting distracted, which causes her to lose her focus, and the package. Hazel tries to regain her focus and get the package delivered on time. The Pikwik Pack delivers a package in which the package cannot be tipped over. Axel however helps them deliver it thanks to his lucky charm, until he loses it.
| 5 | "Giddyup Ol' Blue!" | S: Jeff Biederman, T: Jiro C. Okada | November 28, 2020 | January 10, 2021 | 105A | 0.26 |
| 5 | "Stick Together" | S: Jeff Biederman, T: Jiro C. Okada | November 28, 2020 | January 10, 2021 | 105B | 0.26 |
The Pikwik Pack heads off to the Wonder Woods to make a delivery for Henrietta, but there is one problem, as Axel, after cleaning his truck, forgot to put the fan back in the engine, which causes his truck to break down in the middle of the road. They must get to Wonder Woods on time before Professor Hoot's treasure hunt ends. While preparing for a delivery for Willow and Winston, the wolf twins, Tibor's Super Sticky Slime explodes throughout Pikwik Post, causing the four to get stuck together to each other. The four must deliver it on time in this sticky situation.
| 6 | "Sir Tibor the Brave" | S: Jeff Biederman, T: Jiro C. Okada | December 5, 2020 | January 17, 2021 | 106A | 0.31 |
| 6 | "Tooty Fruity Trouble" | S: Jeff Biederman, T: Jiro C. Okada | December 5, 2020 | January 17, 2021 | 106B | 0.31 |
While delivering a package to Benny the Bear, Tibor starts to have hallucinations from a pretend quest that they were roleplaying, thinking that they were real, until they go through the cave. It is up to Sir Tibor to save the day. While traveling to Tooty Fruity Island to deliver a package to Squick and Squack, Suki is hoping that her boat can travel there in time for the festival, despite the lack of wind, causing Suki to pick up other people that are going to that same festival, until her engine breaks down.
| 7 | "Hangin' Out" | John Slama | January 16, 2021 | January 24, 2021 | 107A | N/A |
| 7 | "Truck Train" | Robert Ardiel | January 16, 2021 | January 24, 2021 | 107B | N/A |
The Pikwik Pack and Chipper, who is visiting Pikwik Post, have a musical delivery to make for Tila the Turtle, who wants to know what the world looks like while upside down with his bat friends Buba and Baya. The sound from Chipper's horn, however, distracts the team from playing their music. Chipper helps the Team with the delivery by saving the package from a high ledge. Axel has modified his truck to look like a train, and he is obsessed with it, making Tibor, who knows a lot about trains, jealous. When they end up using the Truck Train to make a delivery for Baxter the Bear, Axel realizes that he has hurt Tibor's feelings for using his train instead of Tibor's.
| 8 | "Sunshine and Rainbow" | Lakna Edilima | February 6, 2021 | February 14, 2021 | 108A | 0.42 |
| 8 | "For the Win" | John Slama | February 6, 2021 | February 14, 2021 | 108B | 0.42 |
Suki's favorite band, Calvin and The Rainbow Unicorns, are missing something in order for them to perform. They deliver it to them while trying to keep everyone dry when storm clouds arrive during the delivery. The Pikwik Pack race each other to make a bouncy delivery for Rafi the Giraffe, but Axel learns that a race is not just about winning, but about having fun with his friends.
| 9 | "The Snower Express" | Diana Moore | February 27, 2021 | March 7, 2021 | 109A | 0.33 |
| 9 | "Hazel's Naptime" | Robert Ardiel | February 27, 2021 | March 7, 2021 | 109B | 0.33 |
Percy, Petra, and Paloma Penguin are going for a toboggan ride in the snow, but their toboggan cannot fit all three of them. The Pikwik Pack makes a delivery for them, but Axel's obsession over fixing the snow machine causes the machine to take them back to Pikwik Post, and they must figure out how to deliver the package in time. After Hazel beats her own high score on her favorite video game, she falls asleep, with the package, in their runaway hot air balloon. The rest try to catch the balloon in order to complete a delivery for Professor Hoot.
| 10 | "Faster Faster" | S: Jeff Biederman, T: Jeff Biederman and Patrick Granleese | March 6, 2021 | March 14, 2021 | 110A | 0.31 |
| 10 | "You Don't Say" | Robert Ardiel | March 6, 2021 | March 14, 2021 | 110B | 0.31 |
Professor Hoots lends the Pikwik Pack his robot to help around in the post office. While emulating a bird's call to teach his Hootlets, Professor Hoot's vocal cords become affected, therefore making him too soft to hear.
| 11 | "Lost and Found" | Jeff Biederman and Karen Moonah | March 20, 2021 | April 4, 2021 | 111A | N/A |
| 11 | "Hazel's Birthday" | Diana Moore | March 20, 2021 | April 4, 2021 | 111B | N/A |
While preparing food in their stand, The Bison Brothers struggle to locate their equipment. This slows them down and makes customers walk away. To celebrate her birthday, Hazel does some recreation in some places on the way while making a delivery.
| 13 | "Go with the Flow" | Karen Moona | April 17, 2021 | April 18, 2021 | 113A | 0.31 |
| 13 | "Tibor's Butterfly Buddy" | Robert Ardiel | April 17, 2021 | April 18, 2021 | 113B | 0.31 |
The Pikwik Pack delivers a package to Wally, but they must find his home which is on an iceberg that constantly floats away. Tibor is happy that his pet butterfly hatches out of its cocoon, but becomes sad when the insect immediately flies away and would not spend some time with him.
| 14 | "Clever Hazel" | Diana Moore | May 1, 2021 | May 16, 2021 | 114A | 0.39 |
| 14 | "Trash Treasures" | Robert Ardiel | May 1, 2021 | May 16, 2021 | 114B | 0.39 |
Hazel's helicopter freezes way up on top of the Massive Mountains. The Pikwik Pack and Tula Turtle discover that old things can be reused in new ways.
| 15 | "Piece of Cake" | S: Jeff Biederman, T: Diana Moore | May 15, 2021 | May 23, 2021 | 115A | 0.44 |
| 15 | "Quack Magic" | Patrick Granleese | May 15, 2021 | May 23, 2021 | 115B | 0.44 |
Palmer Platypus's friends are not waiting for the completion of the new water slide, and Hazel, on the other hand, does not want to take the baking instructions one step at a time, but later realises that computational thinking is best. Magician Dougie Duck has lost his rabbit and cannot practice his trick. The Pikwik Pack leaves to bring search aid, but Axel's truck hangs in a bad place on the Presto Peaks.
| 16 | "All Hands on Deck" | John Slama | May 29, 2021 | May 30, 2021 | 116A | 0.30 |
| 16 | "A Bright Idea" (Note: This episode is titled "Lighting the Way" on Hulu.) | S: Jeff Biederman and Karen Moonah, T: Karen Moonah | May 29, 2021 | May 30, 2021 | 116B | 0.30 |
Suki is a little nervous as Captain Kate lends her ship for a package delivery. The ship is not easy to steer alone, so Suki has to learn to trust others to get the package to its destination. A package must be taken to Grandpa Grok, and the end of the journey is carried on foot. Fortunately, Axel comes with his invention, a high-tech flashlight, as long as it has enough power.
| 18 | "In the Swing of Things" | Robert Ardiel | June 26, 2021 | July 4, 2021 | 118A | N/A |
| 18 | "Deep Sea Dilemma" | Jiro C. Okada | June 26, 2021 | July 4, 2021 | 118B | N/A |
Professor Hoot finds Ohmagosh with the Hootlets, but at the same time the Hootlets gets lost in the ruins. The Pikwik Pack is looking for them, and on the way Hazel also finds her special talent. Suki is confident that the sonar of her new submarine will guide them to Farmer Phineas's undersea ranch, but Rosy wants to give her the seapony's tips instead.
| 19 | "Who's It For?" | Kate W. James | July 10, 2021 | July 11, 2021 | 119A | N/A |
| 19 | "Wally's Pup" | Karen Moonah | July 10, 2021 | July 11, 2021 | 119B | N/A |
Hazel does not understand how anyone would consider her paper airplanes to be litter, but when she finds them along the package route, it dawns on her that litter can cause harm to others. Suki's friends are excited to care for a little seal by the name of Splash. They remind him to stay back, prepare to rescue him, and remind him that a meditating sparkle-pus is not someone to play with. They are ready for anything, but Suki discovers that taking care of a pet is a big job, forcing her to find someone who can properly care for him.
| 20 | "Fuzzy Little Buddy" (Note: This episode is titled "Furry Faker" on Hulu.) | Jiro C. Okada | July 24, 2021 | July 25, 2021 | 120A | N/A |
| 20 | "Point of Light" | John Slama | July 24, 2021 | July 25, 2021 | 120B | N/A |
When he leaves to transport the consignment, Tibor makes buddies with a clever squirrel who pretends to be sweet and innocent but really has his eye on the package. Soon the squirrel will finally snatch the package, so true buddies are needed to solve the problem. The Pikwik Pack names Tibor driver of the new tunnel-buggy. Tibor is excited to use the tunnel drill, and as he tries to listen to the others's instructions, he gets nervous. Fortunately, he knows what to do to keep going.
| 21 (Note: 20 on Hulu) | "Double Delivery Dash" | Jiro C. Okada | August 14, 2021 | August 15, 2021 | 121A | 0.25 |
| 21 | "Axel's Buddy" | Patrick Granleese | August 14, 2021 | August 15, 2021 | 121B | 0.25 |
The Pikwik Pack is going on a double delivery for Captain Kate and her mini-mates. Suki and Axel are Team Red, and Hazel and Tibor are Team Green. Both teams are competing to see who can get to the destination first. Axel takes his friend Coco, who challenges him to harder driving tricks, on a delivery, but he keeps in mind that taking care of his own responsibilities is an important trick too.
| 12 (Note: 21 on Hulu) | "Shoo Fly" | Patrick Granleese | November 1, 2021 (Note: These episodes were first released on November 1, 2021, on Hulu.) | September 3, 2021 | 112A | N/A |
| 12 | "Hazel's Halloween" | S: Jiro C. Okada, T: Patrick Granleese | November 1, 2021 | September 3, 2021 | 112B | N/A |
The Wolf Twins are excited about their own rooms until they realize that now they have to sleep alone. As he takes the package, Axel learns that a fear of something new will fade as soon as gets to know it. The Pikwik Pack is preparing for Halloween, but Hazel does not like wild ghosts and trolls. On the way to the Halloween party, Hazel finds that using her imagination is just fun.
| 22 (Note: 19 on Hulu) | "Bubblewub" | John Slama | September 18, 2021 | September 18, 2021 | 122A | N/A |
| 22 | "Delivered with Care" | Diana Moore | September 18, 2021 | September 18, 2021 | 122B | N/A |
Hazel wants to deliver the package alone, even though it takes longer than ever. She assures her buddy Bubblewub will help along the way, but others suspect this is just an imaginary friend. Suki's friend Lily shows how fast and convenient everything goes by tapping a tablet, even controlling a bullet train. When Lily takes care of everything, the pack does not have to worry about anything going wrong.
| 24 | "Stormy Seas" | Jiro C. Okada | November 1, 2021 | October 3, 2021 | 124A | N/A |
| 24 | "Hazel's Hero" | John Slama | November 1, 2021 | October 3, 2021 | 124B | N/A |
A big storm has arrived in Pikwik. Tibor wants someone to help Suki, but he ends up helping her. Tibor tries to help Suki make the delivery, but the package gets caught in a whirlpool, and Suki and Tibor have to find a way to make the delivery. Hazel is not sure that her skill is enough to fly to the Mysterious Misty Mountains, where the best of pilots, Jean Loopity-Loop, is lost. But when the recipient of the package is Jean himself, the fears give way.
| 25 | "The Rickety Railway" | John Slama | November 1, 2021 | October 10, 2021 | 125A | N/A |
| 25 | "Ship Wrecked" | Patrick Granleese | November 1, 2021 | October 10, 2021 | 125B | N/A |
Tibor has been taken to meet his hero, Willy Wigglesteam, on his way to Grandma Bunny, but later realises that Willy's adventures on television were staged. Axel transforms Suki's sailboat into a speedboat, but Suki cannot handle a fast boat. Axel is allowed to take the package himself, but he also fails to control the ship and ends up breaking it.
| 26 | "Luna Light Festival" | Jiro C. Okada | November 1, 2021 | October 17, 2021 | 126A | N/A |
| 26 | "Above and Beyond" | John Slama | November 1, 2021 | October 17, 2021 | 126B | N/A |
The Pikwik Pack are conflicted when the team must deliver a package to the Sneaky Squirrel. As an additional surprise, he has snatched the Moon Crystal from the Luna Light Festival. Determination, however, must not be left out of the delivery. Cleo gets a birthday surprise way up at the Pikwik Space Station, by a special transport from the Pikwik Pack. After the rocket has traveled into space, there is a stealth passenger on board, who is an invaluable aid.
| 23 | "The Long Way Wrong Way Home" | Robert Ardiel | November 1, 2021 | November 14, 2021 | 123A | N/A |
| 23 | "Hazel's Toothache" | Karen Moonah | November 1, 2021 | November 14, 2021 | 123B | N/A |
Tibor and Axel take the package to Perry Capybara, but constantly encounter a silly car, the driver of which seems to get lost on his route and threatens to delay the delivery of the package by mistake. Hazel has a loose tooth and has never been to the dentist. The Pikwik Pack takes the package, and Hazel does her best to make sure she doesn't end up with the package at the front desk.
| 17 | "Santa's Helpers" | Diana Moore | November 1, 2021 | November 28, 2021 | 117A | N/A |
| 17 | "Snow Day" | Jiro C. Okada | November 1, 2021 | November 28, 2021 | 117B | N/A |
A snowstorm prevents Santa from entering Pikwik, so all Christmas presents must be delivered by the Pikwik Pack to the town of Pikwik by morning. The last package must be delivered to the town square. The Pikwik Pack team packs the go-kits with snow-buggies for safety. Kits that seemed useless when stuck in the Glassy Glaciers prove to be useful.

== Other media ==
=== Books ===
In October 2019, Scholastic acquired rights to publish Pikwik Pack books.

=== Merchandise ===
Playmates Toys was named as the global toy partner for Pikwik Pack in January 2019; the company released the toys around the world excluding China.

== Broadcast ==
=== Original ===
Pikwik Pack first premiered on Disney Junior in United States on November 7, 2020. In Canada, it began airing on Treehouse TV since December 26, 2020, and on Disney Junior since January 14, 2022; it also aired on Télétoon and La Chaîne Disney in French-speaking Canada. Since September 2021, the series aired on Tiny Pop in the United Kingdom. In Singapore, the series aired on Channel 5 since November 2021, as a part of the Okto on 5 programming block.

The series was also added to Hulu on May 4, 2021, and includes a secondary Spanish dub, but it left on November 2025. In Canada, it is available on Amazon Prime Video, as a part of the StackTV package. In Australia and New Zealand, it is available on Disney+

=== International ===
Pikwik Pack has also been distributed to countries around the world. The series aired on MiniMini+ in Poland, Canal Panda in Portugal and Spain, Yle TV2 in Finland during the Pikku Kakkonen programming block, Rai Yoyo in Italy, Gloobinho in Brazil, Hop! Channel in Israel, TG4 in Ireland, EBC Yoyo in Taiwan, Carousel, O! and Shayan TV in Russia, Super RTL in Germany, KidZone Mini in the Baltic states and HRT 3 in Croatia. The series also aired on Youku, Tencent Video, and Mango TV in China, and on Blim TV in Mexico. The series also aired on Disney Junior in South Korea from April 7, 2021, until its closure on September 30 of the same year.
