= Guru Studio =

Canadian animation studio

- Type: Private
- Industry: Animation
- Founded: May 8, 2000; 26 years ago
- Founders: Frank Falcone; Anne Deslauriers; Chuck Gammage
- Headquarters: Toronto, Ontario, Canada
- Products: Paw Patrol; True and the Rainbow Kingdom; Mecha Builders; Ever After High; Pikwik Pack; Big Blue; Abby Hatcher; Justin Time; My Magic Pet Morphle; Dinopaws
- Owner: Frank Falcone
- Number of employees: est. 400 (2019)
- Parent: Frank Falcone
- Website: www.gurustudio.com

Guru Studio, or simply Guru, is a Canadian animation studio based in Toronto, Ontario. Founded in 2000, they specialize in 3D and 2D animation as well as creating children's properties including Paw Patrol, True and the Rainbow Kingdom, Abby Hatcher, Mecha Builders, Big Blue, Pikwik Pack, Ever After High, Justin Time, and Dinopaws.

The company is currently in production with Moonbug Entertainment on the YouTube series, My Magic Pet Morphle and the family miniseries Charlotte's Web with Sesame Workshop for HBO Max. Guru Studio also contributed visual development on the animated feature film The Breadwinner.

Since February 2016, Guru Studio began a partnership with Toon Boom Animation on developing and incorporating features into Toon Boom's animation software, Harmony.

== Filmography ==
=== Original productions ===
- Justin Time (2011–2016)
- Mudpit (2012–2013)
- Nemesis (2013)
- Dinopaws (2014)
- Ever After High (2013–2016)
- Paw Patrol (2013–present)
- Shimmer and Shine (2015–2020)
- The Breadwinner (2017)
- True and the Rainbow Kingdom (2017–2019)
- Abby Hatcher (2019–2022)
- Pikwik Pack (2020–2021)
- Big Blue (2021–2022)
- Mecha Builders (2022–2023)
- My Magic Pet Morphle (2024–2025)
- Charlotte's Web (2025)
- Spirit of Ridgeway High (TBA)
