= Big Blue (TV series) =

Canadian animated sitcom

- Genre: Adventure; Animated sitcom; Science fiction
- Created by: Gyimah Gariba
- Developed by: Gyimah Gariba
- Directed by: Riccardo Durante
- Voices of: Kevin Duhaney; Jeremy Harris; Tianna MacDuff-Gibson; Tal Shulman; Bahia Watson
- Theme music composer: Jared Gutstadt; Joel S. Silver; Timbaland
- Composer: Joel S. Silver
- Country of origin: Canada
- Original language: English
- No. of seasons: 1
- No. of episodes: 26 (52 segments)

Production
- Producers: Heather Wilson; Rebecca Lager
- Running time: 22 minutes (two 11-minute segments)
- Production company: Guru Studio

Original release
- Network: CBC Kids / Radio Canada
- Release: December 4, 2021 – June 18, 2022

Big Blue is a Canadian animated sitcom for children ages 5 to 9 created by Gyimah Gariba and produced by Guru Studio. The series debuted on CBC Kids on December 4, 2021, in Canada, on Nicktoons on January 10, 2022, in the United Kingdom and on The Roku Channel on October 1, 2024, in the United States. The series follows Lettie, and her crew as the Calypso in United Current, with her brother, Lemo, pals Freddie and Phil and Bacon Berry, who might just be the one who can save the Big Blue. They go on missions and explore the ocean and must stop the splat of pollution, the Blegh, who can only be defeated by Bacon Berry, and discover why and how they can care for each other around any predicament.

== Plot ==
Set in an underwater world where humans live alongside anthropomorphic sea creatures, the show is about the crew of the United Current submarine Calypso, composed of the Sibling Team Lettie and Lemo (who are the crew's captain and science officer, respectively), a laid-back turtle named Freddie (the ship's mechanic), a nervous dolphin named Phil (the resident medic), and Bacon Berry, a childlike magical guardian of mysterious origin and power. Under the command of the diminutive Admiral Krill and his number two Commander Plink, they explore the seas and take on missions to defend the ocean from various threats, most prominently a sapient mass of pollution known as The Blegh that seeks to corrupt all of the Big Blue, while helping to redefine what a family means and how caring for one another is the most important thing of all.

== Characters ==
=== Main characters ===
- Lettie (voiced by Bahia Watson) - the captain of the Calypso Crew. She takes her job and responsibility in a serious manner, therefore she can be irritated at the stuff Lemo does, but she knows how to get her team out of bad situations. She also has a soft side on Bacon Berry and is best friends with Commander Plink.
- Lemo (voiced by Kevin Duhaney) - the chief scientist and Lettie's little brother. He invents things that are not needed at times, and they usually either are not liked or they miserably fail, and Lettie does not like that, but he can also get the job done.
- Phil (voiced by Jeremy Harris) - an anthropomorphic medic bottlenose dolphin of the Calypso Crew, who sometimes gets nervous about missions, but he is loyal whenever he helps his crew mates. In the episode, "Fraidy Phil", it is revealed that he has a huge fear of sea spiders, and in "Captain Bossy Fins" his parents are seen for the first time, making him the only crew member who is confirmed to have parents.
- Freddie (voiced by Tal Shulman) - an anthropomorphic mechanical engineer sea turtle of the Calypso Crew who is laid back and a bit kooky, but he can help fix anything in the Calypso when it goes wrong. In the episode "Dodge Bubble", it is revealed that he used to play dodgeball (or dodge bubble in this instance). He is also the only sea turtle in the series.
- Bacon Berry or BB (voiced by Tianna Macduff-Gibson) - the newborn guardian of the Big Blue and the Calypso Crew who has powers of the ocean. She sacrifices herself in order to save the Big Blue from the evil Blegh in the series finale "Return of the Blegh", which leads to the result of her transformation into flowers, and a new orb that she was born in appears at the end of the series finale with her eyes in it.

=== Supporting characters ===
- Admiral Krill (voiced by A.C. Peterson) - an anthropomorphic krill who is in charge of United Current.
- Commander Plink (voiced by Ana Sani) - Admiral Krill's number two of United Current and Lettie's best friend. In "Revenge of the Sibs", she has an adoptive family of angelfish.
- Mira Clearwater (voiced by Shannon Hamilton) - an anthropomorphic manta ray captain and rival of Lettie since they were cadets.
- King Puffypants (voiced by Jonathan Wilson) - an anthropomorphic pufferfish who is king of Pufferia; a kingdom with pufferfish.
- Remo (voiced by Jeremy Harris) - An anthropomorphic sardine who is a very serious science officer.
- Lea Lionfish (voiced by Mouna Traoré) - an anthropomorphic lionfish who is a famous television actor and singer.

=== Villains ===
- The Blegh (voiced by Ron Rubin) - A sentient piece of ooze and Bacon Berry's arch-enemy whose goal is to pollute the Big Blue and take over the world. He was destroyed by Bacon Berry's sacrifice in the series finale "Return of the Blegh".
- Captain No Beard (voiced by Neil Crone) - a lemon shark pirate.
- Spoony (voiced by Neil Crone) - A piranha who is No Beard's henchmen.
- Cuddles (voiced by Brandon McGibbon) - An octopus thief.

== Broadcast ==
Big Blue first premiered on CBC Kids on December 4, 2021, at 10:15 AM EST, airing the first two episodes "Goo in the Loo" and "Let's Get Kraken".

Shortly after, the series would premiere on Nicktoons in the United Kingdom and Ireland on January 10, 2022, at 8:00 AM BST on weekdays, with repeats being shown at 6:00 PM BST on weekends. It should also be noted that a sneak peek of the series aired in December, a month prior to the premiere in the United Kingdom.

On February 14, 2022, the series premiered on ABC Me at 4:20pm AEDT.

The series premiered on Cartoon Network in Africa on March 7, 2022, at 7:30 AM CAT.

The series subsequently aired on EBS 1 (South Korea), Boing and Boomerang (France), NRK Super (Norway), CTC Kids (Russia), Panda Kids (Portugal), Clan (Spain), RTS 1 (Switzerland), MBC 3 (Middle East), and Cartoon Network (Latin America).

Nickelodeon acquired the European broadcasting rights of this show with exception with France, Spain, Latin America, Germany and Russia.

=== Streaming ===
The series was made available of CBC's CBC Gem service shortly after the premier of the series in Canada.

In the United Kingdom, the series is available to watch on Sky Kids, Sky Go and Now.

In Australia, the series is available to stream on ABC iview.

In China, the series is available to stream on Youku.

The series is available on The Roku Channel in the United States as of October 1, 2024, after Guru Studio and Roku struck a deal to distribute the series on the streaming service back in late 2023.

== Episodes ==
| No. | Title | Written by | Original release date | Nicktoons UK air date | Prod. code | UK linear viewers (millions) |
|---|---|---|---|---|---|---|
| 1 | "Goo in the Loo" | Diana Moore | December 4, 2021 | January 12, 2022 | 102 | 8.7 |
| 1 | "Let's Get Kraken" | Laurie Elliot | December 4, 2021 | January 12, 2022 | 102 | 8.7 |
"Goo in the Loo": Bacon Berry is frustrated when the crew keeps telling her that she's too young to do certain things on her own. But when she's forced to a tide-out aboard the Calypso during one of their missions to clean up a mysterious (yet dangerous) ooze, she's the only one who's going to have to save everyone!; "Let's Get Kraken": Lemo becomes a nuisance to everyone when he becomes obsessed with music when a Kraken has consumed everything at an amusement park, along with everyone in it (including Commander Plink and Admiral Krill), and the Calypso must stop this Kraken.
| 2 | "Frenemies" | Diana Moore | December 11, 2021 | January 10, 2022 | 103 | 4.9 |
| 2 | "Plant in the Pipes" | Laurie Elliot | December 11, 2021 | January 10, 2022 | 103 | 4.9 |
"Frenemies": The Calypso crew have always relied on teamwork to get by, but when Mira Clearwater steals missions from them and completes them before Lettie and her crew can even intervene, the captain decides to take matters into her own hands.; "Plant in the Pipes": Lemo introduces the crew to his latest invention, Sudsworth, a robot butler. And when they're under pressure when they learn at the last minute that the ship is about to be inspected for Bacon Berry's safety, Lettie gets mad at Lemo and everyone starts cleaning up, while Lemo buys a cursed plant that becomes a mutant.
| 3 | "Jellyous" | Jason Hopley | December 18, 2021 | TBA | 104 | 9.0 |
| 3 | "Fraidy Phil" | Tom Berger | December 18, 2021 | TBA | 104 | 9.0 |
"Jellyous": After a volcano erupts, the Calypso crew save a baby jellyfish named Jeffy, but as they bring it in the ship, they pay more attention to him than Bacon Berry, which makes her jealous, while Jeffy's parents try to look for him.; "Fraidy Phil": Phil reveals that he is scared of sea spiders due to a terrifying part of his childhood, and his fear jeopardizes the Calypso's newest mission: save Glacial City from a giant sea spider.
| 4 | "BB on Board" | Jason Hopley | December 25, 2021 | TBA | 101 | 5.0 |
| 4 | "A Royal Mistake" | Jason Hopley | December 25, 2021 | TBA | 101 | 5.0 |
"BB on Board": As Lettie tries to make things right during a mission, the crew is intrigued by their latest discovery and eventually realizes that it's more than just a cute creature.; Note: This episode is an origin of how BB joins the Calypso Crew. This is also the first episode of the series by production order.: "A Royal Mistake": Bacon Berry learns not to take things that don't belong to her when the crew is taken hostage by King Puffypants and his guards. Lettie and Lemo must return without getting caught what she took without permission.
| 5 | "Let It Go Lemo" | Jason Hopley | January 1, 2022 | TBA | 106 | N/A |
| 5 | "Arlo and Me" | Jason Hopley | January 1, 2022 | TBA | 106 | N/A |
"Let It Go Lemo": Lettie discovers that the Calypso is too heavy because Lemo hasn't gotten rid of any of his precious memories. Lemo tries to find other ways to get rid of his mess and finds he can help others at the same time.; "Arlo and Me": Lettie and the rest of the crew aren't happy because Lemo's sea pig is causing chaos aboard the Calypso. They finally decide to take him back to the Midnight Zone, but Lemo is too attached to him to take him home.
| 6 | "Coral Circut" | Ashley Lannigan | January 8, 2022 | TBA | 107 | N/A |
| 6 | "Sub-divided" | Phil McCordic | January 8, 2022 | TBA | 107 | N/A |
"Coral Curcuit": It's the Coral Curcuit and the Calypso is taking part in it for the first time. Lettie is not one to cheat, unlike the other contestants. But she desperately wants to prove herself, so will she let her desire to win outweigh her values?; "Sub-divided": The crew members receive a cake as a reward for completing a mission, but it disappears. They all blame each other, and that creates conflict. As Bacon Berry listens to them tell their side of the story, she makes a startling revelation.
| 7 | "Engine Trouble" | Tally Young Knoll | January 15, 2022 | TBA | 110 | N/A |
| 7 | "Losing Lemo" | Ben Joseph | January 15, 2022 | TBA | 110 | N/A |
"Engine Trouble": Freddie has a tough time when his comrades decide to replace Engie with a new, state-of-the-art system. The engineer then seeks what role he could play aboard the Calypso. The crew will quickly realize that the Zoomitron 500,000 does not only have advantages....; "Losing Lemo": Lemo is thrilled to be invited to intern at United Current headquarters. It must help those who work there by proposing original solutions to their problems. Lettie doubts that Lemo-Logic is suitable for Admiral Krill's teams. Will Lemo be able to adapt to this new environment?
| 8 | "My Li'l Captain" | Jerome Simpson | January 22, 2022 | TBA | 105 | N/A |
| 8 | "Walk the Plank" | Desmond Sargeant | January 22, 2022 | TBA | 105 | N/A |
"My Li'l Captain": The Seahorse King asks Lettie and her crew to watch over his treasures during a party. Bacon Berry finds herself face to face with an octopus thief named Cuddles, but her friends do not understand that she needs their help. She has to trust herself to be able to trap this nasty thief on her own.; "Walk the Plank": When dangerous steam geisers begin popping up, the Calypso Crew set out on a mission to find out what is causing all the ruptures in the sea bed. Bacon Berry is upset because no one has time to play pirates with her anymore. The little one therefore leaves the ship in search of real pirates. What will happen to her?
| 9 | "Diary Woes" | Emer Connon | January 29, 2022 | TBA | 109 | N/A |
| 9 | "Cruise Control" | Jeremy Winkels | January 29, 2022 | TBA | 109 | N/A |
"Diary Woes": In a rush to catch the mail ship, Lemo accidentally sends Lettie's diary to headquarters instead of her Captain's Log. As soon as he realizes this, he embarks on a secret mission to recover it. How will he do to prevent his big sister from being humiliated by his fault?; "Cruise Control": When Lettie becomes frustrated with the crew's work ethic, she decides she would be better off doing everything on her own (which proves to be impossible), and the Calypso collides with the Seahorse King and Queen's cruise ship! Will she end up accepting the help of her friends to meet the many requests of her guests?
| 10 | "Crying Dutchman" | Ben Joseph | February 26, 2022 | TBA | 116 | N/A |
| 10 | "Remora Never More-a" | Tom Berger | February 26, 2022 | TBA | 116 | N/A |
"Crying Dutchman": Bacon Berry's favorite toy, Princess Sharky disappears, and she is inconsolable. Lemo is determined to find Princess Sharky and prove that the thief is none other than the Crying Dutchman! Faced with a difficult situation, Lemo must make a sad choice in order to complete his mission.; "Remorea Never More-a": The Calypso Crew is uneasy when Phil makes a new best friend and brings him onboard to stay. Everyone tries to explain to Phil that Rikki is taking advantage of him, but the dolphin doesn't want to hear it, because he likes that Rikki always stands up for him. Will Phil learn to speak up for himself?
| 11 | "Change of Hearrrt" | Mark Steinberg | March 5, 2022 | March 7, 2022 | 113 | N/A |
| 11 | "Ooze on the Loose" | Ben Joseph | March 5, 2022 | March 8, 2022 | 113 | N/A |
"Change of Hearrrt": The Calypso Crew must protect the Golden Anchor of Atlantis of thieves until they can safely deliver it to United Current Museum of History. By a strange coincidence, it is today that Captain No Beard's first mate Spoony has chosen to become someone honest... Bacon Berry has confidence in him, but Lettie does not let her guard down. Should we beware of this former thief?; "Ooze on the Loose": The Black Ooze escapes and makes plans to restore chaos in the Big Blue and destroy The Guardian. The Calypso Crew understand that there's a problem when everything starts acting strangely inside the ship. Lettie decides to take matters into her own hands, but will she be able to fix the problem on her own?
| 12 | "Shell Game" | Alex Ganetakos | March 12, 2022 | March 9, 2022 | 117 | N/A |
| 12 | "The Good, The Bad and the Goopy" | Ashley Lannigan | March 12, 2022 | March 10, 2022 | 117 | N/A |
"Shell Game": When Phil discovers how safe and secure he feels after Freddie let him borrow his shell, he suddenly thinks he is indestructible! Phil puts the crew in danger when he decides to compete in a Pufferian wrestling match. He'll have to use his old, nervy way to try to defeat his opponents.; "The Good, The Bad and The Goopy": It's Bacon Berry's birthday and the crew is excited to celebrate but their spirits are dampened when they realize that Phil bout the wrong gift for the occasion. He blames himself and decides to go in search of a present that represents the Calypso's cutest member's favorite hero. Phil will encounter several obstacles during his mission, but there's no question of giving up!
| 13 | "Lettiebot" | Mark Steinberg | March 19, 2022 | March 11, 2022 | 108 | N/A |
| 13 | "Quibbling Rivalry" | Tom Berger | March 19, 2022 | March 14, 2022 | 108 | N/A |
"Lettiebot": Lettie has so much work to do as the Captain of the Calypso that she can't join in the fun with the rest of the crew, so Lemo comes up with an invention to help.; "Quibbling Rivalry": Lemo and Lettie are fighting over everything, irritating the entire crew.
| 14 | "Funderstruck" | Jeremy Winkels | March 26, 2022 | TBA | 114 | N/A |
| 14 | "Fins Up" | Ashley Lannigan | March 26, 2022 | TBA | 114 | N/A |
"Funderstruck": When the Calypso Crew think that Lettie is not fun enough, she asks Captain Tubular to teach her how to become a Fun-Captain. Lettie gets carried away when she decides to show her crew just how fun she can be.; "Fins Up": The Calypso Crew is on a secret mission to escort Big Blue superstar, Lea, to her concert. Lettie uses this opportunity to make her rival Mira Clearwater jealous and must deal with the consequences of her decision.
| 15 | "There's no Chair in Team" | Emer Connon | April 2, 2022 | TBA | 112 | N/A |
| 15 | "The Experiment" | Alex Ganetakos | April 2, 2022 | TBA | 112 | N/A |
"There's no Chair in Team": The Calypso Crew follow their motto of teamwork to win the dance off against the reigning champions. With the arrival of the winning prize, The Calypso Crew is having a very hard time sharing.; "The Experiment": Lemo is babysitting while working on an experiment. Bacon Berry just wants Lemo to pay attention to her. When he discovers his experiment works, Lemo must try and return things to normal before Lettie and the crew get home.
| 16 | "Revenge of the Sibs" | Alex Ganetakos | April 9, 2022 | TBA | TBA | N/A |
| 16 | "Photo Day Disaster" | Laurie Elliott | April 9, 2022 | TBA | TBA | N/A |
"Revenge of the Sibs": Working on his entry for the science fair, Lemo is unaware of how it is disturbing the rest of the crew and Lettie has had enough. When Lemo meets fellow scientist Penny, they decide to work together.; "Photo Day Disaster": The Calypso Crew must have an official photo taken. Lettie panics and wants to try and make it perfect. Her intensity leads to a series of disasters that helps capture the true essence of the Calypso Crew.
| 17 | "Truthfully Yours" | Emer Connon | April 16, 2022 | TBA | TBA | N/A |
| 17 | "Dodge Bubble" | Ben Joseph | April 16, 2022 | TBA | TBA | N/A |
"Truthfully Yours": While Krill is presenting a commemorative statue to mark a new beginning, it crumbles to pieces once unveiled. Lettie works hard to reunite the Stingrays and the Pufferfish in order to avoid the mistake she made.; "Dodge Bubble": Lemo discovers one of Freddie's hidden talents and despite Freddie's resistance, Lemo finds a way to take him back to his old life. The Calypso Crew see a new side of Freddie that they could never have imagined.
| 18 | "Mini Mira" | Jeremy Winkels | April 23, 2022 | TBA | TBA | N/A |
| 18 | "Understudy Buddy" | Ashley Lannigan | April 23, 2022 | TBA | TBA | N/A |
"Mini Mira": Lettie is incredulous when The United Current sends Mira Clearwater to babysit for Bacon Berry. Anticipating failure on Mira's part, Lettie is surprised to see how easily they bond and becomes jealous.; "Understudy Buddy": Lettie is sceptical about training Lea for an upcoming role, and must teach her everything about being a Captain in just one day.
| 19 | "Better Never Than Late" | Mark Steinberg | April 30, 2022 | TBA | N/A | |
| 19 | "Faith in Freddie" | Ben Joseph | April 30, 2022 | TBA | N/A | |
"Better Never Than Late": Lettie arrives nine hours early to accept her punctuality award but Lemo's antics might make them miss the ceremony altogether.; "Faith in Freddie": When Freddie's quirky mission-based ideas never seem to appeal to Lettie, he becomes sad about not being understood by his crewmates. But when Lemo, Lettie and Phil become captured during a mission to save Pufferia from the Blegh, the crew finally get to see Freddie's weirdly awesome ideas in action.
| 20 | "Game Nightmare" | Phil McCordic | May 7, 2022 | TBA | TBA | N/A |
| 20 | "Captain Lemo" | Desmond Sargeant | May 7, 2022 | TBA | TBA | N/A |
"Game Nightmare": Lemo decides to create the ultimate gaming system wired to the ship when the crew cancels game night. He unwittingly puts the ship and his friends in danger. They must do their best to avoid the worst.; "Captain Lemo: Lettie is hesitant when she leaves Lemo in charge of the Calypso while she is away. But while she's gone, Lemo accidentally activates hyperdrive and the Calypso drives out of control! Will they be able to solve the problem before Lettie finds out?
| 21 | "My Dinner with Krill" | Craig Martin | May 14, 2022 | TBA | TBA | N/A |
| 21 | "What's Your Vector, Collector" | Craig Martin | May 14, 2022 | TBA | TBA | N/A |
"My Dinner with Krill": When the Calypso Crew gets an invitation to a formal dinner party, Lettie must teach them manners and how to be fancy. But things don't go as she planned... Tunnu Thundertail, her hero, then helps her understand that there's no point in trying to change people, because the best thing is to always to be yourself!; "What's Your Vector, Collector": Bacon Berry accidentally breaks one of Lettie's collectible dolls. So she's ready to do anything to replace her figurine! She leads her crew on a dangerous mission without wondering if it's all worth it.
| 22 | "A Night at the TheaRRR" | Ashley Lannigan | May 21, 2022 | TBA | TBA | N/A |
| 22 | "Hero Boy" | Jeremy Winkels | May 21, 2022 | TBA | TBA | N/A |
"A Night At The TheatRRR": Lettie's relaxing night out with Commander Plink and Mira Clerawater turns into an unexpected mission when Lettie discovers Captain NoBeard and his crew trying to steal from the dinner guests.; "Hero Boy": Lemo secretly uses Bacon Berry's super powers to do rescues and ends up becoming a famous hero because of it.
| 23 | "Lemo vs. Phil" | Craig Martin | May 28, 2022 | TBA | TBA | N/A |
| 23 | "Busted" | Craig Martin | May 28, 2022 | TBA | TBA | N/A |
"Lemo vs. Phil": Lettie can't stand hearing Lemo and Phil arguing anymore. So she sends them on a mission together. Their troubles begin when they crash the mini sub. After blaming one another for the accident they must put their heads together and rescue themselves. Will they be able to get along?; "Busted": Phil is injured on a mission and needs to rest. The rest of the crew do everything they can to take care of him. Even though he's getting better, Phil tricks others into thinking he's still hurt. Unfortunately, his lies put BB in danger. Can he save her?
| 24 | "The Incredible Lemo, and his Dancing Sea Flea, Sloan!" | Craig Martin | June 4, 2022 | TBA | TBA | N/A |
| 24 | "Baby Bro No More" | Craig Martin | June 4, 2022 | TBA | TBA | N/A |
"The Incredible Lemo, and his Dancing Sea Flea, Sloan!": Lemo wants to win a talent contest hosted by Lea, but the crowd doesn't understand what he wants to show her and he leaves the stage humiliated. He then decides to turn to science to improve his number. Unfortunately, Lemo exaggerates and it goes wrong... Will he succeed in winning the hearts of the public?; "Baby Bro No More": It's Lemo's 10th birthday, but despite his best efforts to appear older, everyone keeps treating him like a child. When the opportunity arises, Lemo embarks on a dangerous mission to prove he is not a baby any more! Will he succeed in achieving his goal?
| 25 | "Now You Sea Ghosts, Now You Don't" | Craig Martin | June 11, 2022 | TBA | TBA | N/A |
| 25 | "Captain Bossy Fins" | Craig Martin | June 11, 2022 | TBA | TBA | N/A |
"Now You Sea Ghosts, Now You Don't": The Calypso Crew is on a mission to find Dr. McGuirk, a renowned archeologist who went missing in an abandoned shopping mall. Lemo and Phil get separated from the rest of the team and face some spooky encounters! Where could that strange music be coming from?; "Captain Bossy Fins": Lettie surprises Phil with a visit from his parents. He should be happy to see them, but there's just one problem, Phil has told them that he is the captain of the Calypso. He asks his friends to hide his lie, but everything not everything goes as planned.
| 26 | "Ready Steady Lettie" | Mark Steinberg | June 18, 2022 | TBA | TBA | N/A |
| 26 | "Return of the Blegh" | Craig Martin | June 18, 2022 | TBA | TBA | N/A |
"Ready Steady Lettie": Lettie is happy to welcome the United Current junior cadets aboard the Calypso. Commander Plink warns her that it might be difficult to capture their attention, since only their tablets interest them. She'll have to find something exiting enough to impress them.; "Return of the Blegh": Lettie triggers a Code Coral when she realizes that Bacon Berry predicts the return of the Blegh! All the crews of the United Current gather to fight the ooze, but only BB has the power to defeat him. Will she be able to save her family and the Big Blue?; Note: The Blegh and Bacon Berry are the only characters to pass away, which was both at the same time in this episode, so this was shown emotional to viewers upon seeing BB's sacrifice. However, Bacon Berry was revived by the end, whilst the Blegh isn't revived.
