= My Magic Pet Morphle =

Children's animated television series

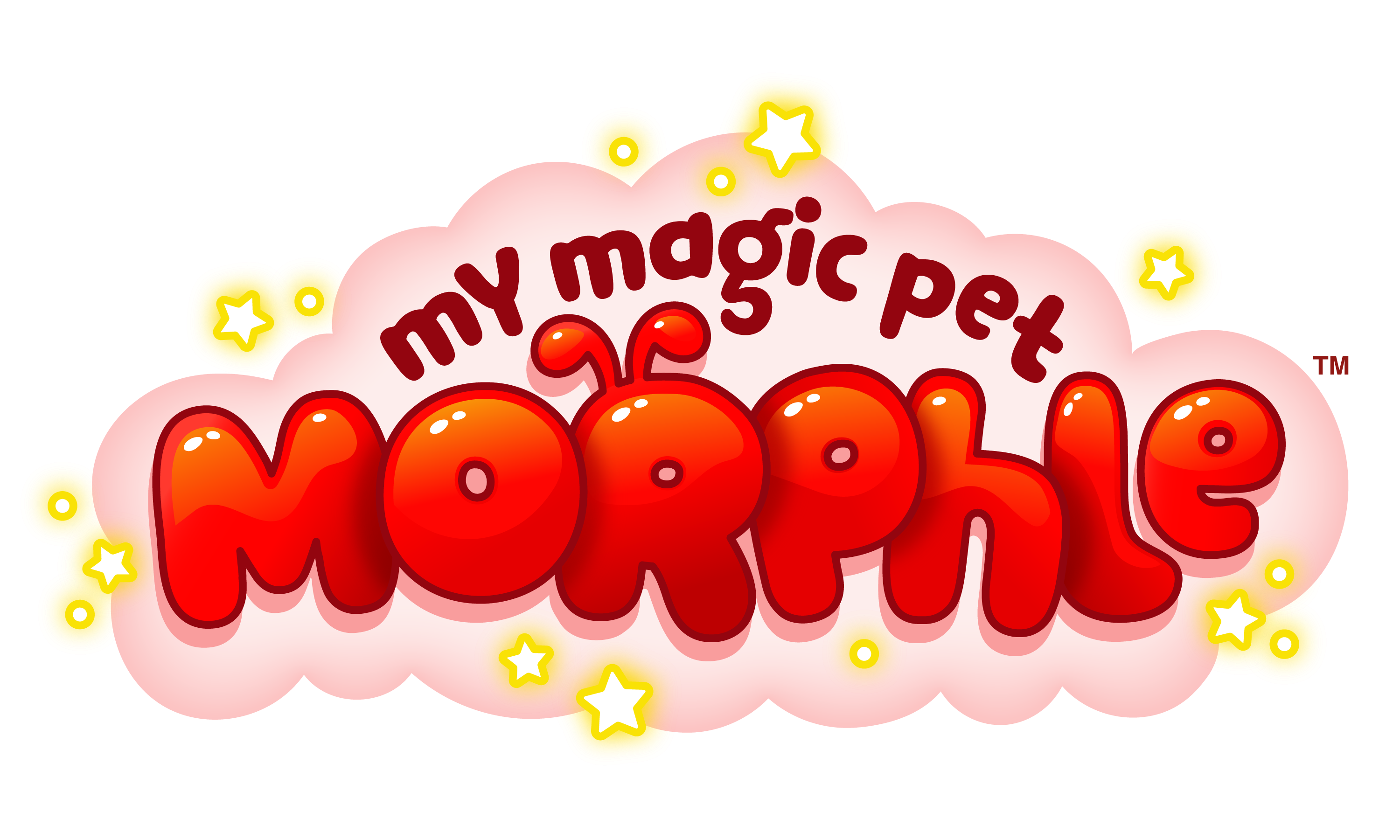
- Also known as: Morphle
- Genre: Preschool
- Created by: Arthur van Merwijk
- Countries of origin: United Kingdom; Netherlands
- Original language: English
- No. of seasons: 2
- No. of episodes: 324

Production
- Animator: Arthur van Merwijk
- Running time: 1-5 minutes (per short)
- Production companies: Guru Studio; Moonbug Entertainment

Original release
- Network: YouTube; Netflix; Amazon Prime Video; Apple TV; Hulu
- Release: 16 December 2011 – 29 March 2016

My Magic Pet Morphle, also known as Morphle, is a fantasy animated children's TV series created and conceptualized by animator Arthur van Merwijk in 2011. Produced by YouTube channel Morphle TV, which was acquired by Moonbug Entertainment in 2018 and announced in February 2019, the series premiered on Netflix on January 10, 2019. The show is about a human girl named Mila and her magic pet Morphle who can transform his appearance at Mila's will, and teaches themes of friendship, problem-solving and creativity to its preschool audience. Morphle is hosted on digital platforms including Netflix, Apple TV, Hulu and Amazon Prime Video.

== Premise ==
The show revolves around a young girl named Mila, who is best friends with Morphle, a red magic pet with rabbit-like ears who is able to transform or 'morph' into anything. They often help others around town or help to stop the bad guys, learning lessons about problem-solving, colors, shapes and friendship.

== Characters ==
- Mila is a young girl who often wears blue clothing. She is always seen with her magic pet, Morphle and is the leader in their adventures together.
- Morphle is the titular red rabbit-like magic pet who is Mila's pet, friend, and a little kinda-like-a-sibling at times. His special ability is shape-shifting into anything. He has a high-pitched voice and refers to himself and others in the third-person. Even though he is described as Mila's pet, they are more like siblings/best friends.
- Jordie is a young boy and Mila's stepbrother. He happily goes along with Mila and Morphle's adventures, even if it puts him outside of his comfort zone. He carries around a Magic Pet Primer, a tablet database full of information.

== History ==
In 2011, van Merwijk, an animation school graduate, created a YouTube channel for preschoolers based on nursery rhymes. Throughout the first year van Merwijk produced every episode himself. His sister, who is a professional singer, created the music for the show. Van Merwijk drew the characters and his friend, Daan Velsink, created the rig-animation. After saving his profits during the program's first year, he used the money to set up a studio in Amsterdam. He hired animators and artists and created additional videos per month.

My Magic Pet Morphle was originally titled Mila and Her Magic Pet, and the YouTube channel uploaded its first video on 19 December 2011, and it was a Christmas special video (the first non-Christmas video was released on 14 January 2012). At the time, Morphle had a tail on his back until it was removed in 2014.

The show functioned this way until 2015 when it took on its current TV-show format. According to van Merwijk, Morphle is one of the first preschool channels on YouTube that treated its videos as episodes of a traditional television program. When van Merwijk made this change, viewership grew substantially. By 2016 the show had millions of views each month.

In November 2018, Moonbug Entertainment purchased Morphle TV from van Merwijk. At the time of the purchase the show had about five million subscribers and 3.7 billion views.

In February 2021, Moonbug partnered with Poetic Brands to create branded children's apparel based on My Magic Pet Morphle.

== Episodes ==
This episode list reflects original upload dates on the official YouTube channel Morphle TV.

No. overall	No. in series	Title	Original release date
1	1	"My Magic Train"	25 March 2015
2	2	"My Pet Dinosaur"	5 May 2015
3	3	"My Red Racecar"	19 May 2015
4	4	"If You're Happy and You Know It!"	11 June 2015
5	5	"My Pet Unicorn"	22 July 2015
6	6	"My Pet T-Rex"	23 September 2015
7	7	"My Red Digger"	20 October 2015
8	8	"My Red Bike"	25 October 2015
9	9	"My Magic Shapes"	2 November 2015
10	10	"My Pet Dragon"	11 November 2015
11	11	"My Red Fire truck"	17 November 2015
12	12	"Children's Drawings Come Alive Through Animation!"	19 November 2015
13	13	"My Magic Christmas Present"	30 November 2015
14	14	"Animal Phonics"	1 December 2015
15	15	"My Red Spaceship"	7 December 2015
16	16	"My Red Monster Truck"	14 December 2015
17	17	"My Magic Colors"	17 December 2015
18	18	"My Pet Dinosaur: Ptyrodactyl"	29 December 2015
19	19	"Learn to Count with Animals"	13 January 2016
20	20	"My Pet Elephant"	17 January 2016
21	21	"My Red Bulldozer"	22 January 2016
22	22	"My Magic Numbers"	23 January 2016
23	23	"My Red Boat"	30 January 2016
24	24	"My Red Helicopter"	1 February 2016
25	25	"My Red Airplane"	4 March 2016
26	26	"Morphle's Mailbox"	19 April 2016
27	27	"My Pet Dinosaur: Triceratops"	29 March 2016
