= Abby Hatcher =

Canadian children's animated television series

- Genre: Educational; Action; Adventure; Comedy
- Created by: Rob Hoegee
- Directed by: Kyran Kelly
- Voices of: Macy Drouin; Wyatt White; Christian Dal Dosso; Michela Luci; Emma Berman; Jacob Soley; Hattie Kragten; Sophie Culligan; Laaibah Alvi; Leo Orgil; Kaden Stephen; Paul Sun-Hyung Lee; Josette Jorge; Terry McGurrin; Kim Roberts; Christian Campbell; Mac Heywood; Catherine Disher; Jane Luk
- Theme music composer: Ryan Carlson; Summer Weiler; Hanna Ashbrook; Chris Sernel
- Opening theme: "Abby Hatcher" by Macy Drouin
- Composer: Ryan Carlson
- Country of origin: Canada
- Original language: English
- No. of seasons: 2
- No. of episodes: 52 (100 segments) (list of episodes)

Production
- Executive producers: Rob Hoegee; Jennifer Dodge; Laura Clunie; Ronnen Harary; Jamie Whitney
- Producers: Jonah Stroh; Cynthia Taylor
- Running time: 22 minutes
- Production companies: Guru Studio; Spin Master Entertainment; Nickelodeon Productions

Original release
- Network: Nickelodeon (United States); TVOKids (Canada)
- Release: January 1, 2019 – April 4, 2022

Abby Hatcher (originally titled Abby Hatcher, Fuzzly Catcher) is a Canadian 3D-animated television series created by Rob Hoegee. Produced by Spin Master Entertainment for Nickelodeon and animated by Guru Studio, the series premiered on Nickelodeon in the United States on January 1, 2019, TVOKids in Canada on February 11, 2019, and on Channel 5's Milkshake! block on March 2, 2020 in the United Kingdom. It premiered online on December 14, 2018.

On June 4, 2019, the series was renewed for a second season. By November 15, 2019, new episodes moved to the Nick Jr. channel.

== Premise ==
The series follows an intelligent and energetic seven-year-old girl named Abby Hatcher, and her new friends, the Fuzzlies. The Fuzzlies are quirky creatures that live in her family's hotel. Together with her best Fuzzly friend Bozzly, Abby goes on wild adventures to fix Fuzzly mishaps and help them in any way she can.

== Broadcast ==
Abby Hatcher made its Canadian debut on educational provincial broadcasters TVOKids and Knowledge Network on February 11, 2019. The show premiered on Nick Jr. in the United Kingdom on May 6, 2019, and on Channel 5's Milkshake! block on March 2, 2020. It was pulled from Paramount+ on January 5, 2024, and Netflix on November 7, 2025.

== Episodes ==
Season	Episodes	Segments	Originally released	
Season	Episodes	Segments	First released	Last released
1	26	51	January 1, 2019	February 16, 2020
2	26	49	March 8, 2020	April 2, 2022

== Ratings ==
Viewership and ratings per season of Abby Hatcher
Season	Episodes	First aired		Last aired		Avg. viewers (millions)
Season	Episodes	Date	Viewers (millions)	Date	Viewers (millions)	Avg. viewers (millions)
1	35	January 1, 2019	1.08	February 17, 2020	0.36	0.62
2	25	March 6, 2020	0.31	April 4, 2022	0.10	0.30

== Characters ==
=== Main ===
- Abby Hatcher (voiced by Macy Drouin) is a bespectacled seven-year-old girl of mixed Canadian-Chinese descent who possesses detective skills. She is equipped with a wrist device called the Fuzzly Spotter which notifies her of a trouble involving a Fuzzly, plus it can operate different things in the hotel.
- Bozzly (voiced by Wyatt White) is a sweet, cute, brave and aquamarine rabbit-like Fuzzly who can turn invisible, and fly (by spinning his ears like a propeller). He also has super sensitive hearing, and has a front pocket containing various objects (some of which are larger than him). He is Abby's best friend and partner.

=== Recurring ===
==== Fuzzlies ====
- Princess Flug (voiced by Michela Luci) is a pink slug-like Fuzzly who is made of glitter goo which can either be sticky or slippery. She can blow bubbles that could carry away anything that gets inside them, or neutralize sticky glitter goo. She has a cousin named Flugtilda who is orange-colored and bespectacled. She speaks in Broken English and always adds the word "me" to the beginning and end of her sentences.
- Teeny Terry (voiced by Jacob Soley) is a small round marigold cat-bird-like Fuzzly with winged arms that allow him to fly. He can inflate like a balloon which enables him to fly higher and carry more load.
- Otis (voiced by Christian Dal Dosso) is a red raspberry-like Fuzzly with three extendable tentacles on his head which can be used for swinging or reaching things several feet away. His tentacles also have holes that open which can stick to objects or pump air to inflatables.
- Curly (voiced by Sophie Cullingan) is a pink and orange rabbit-like Fuzzly with a spiral tail that can work like a spring, thus allowing her to leap high (and to also hold things as she lacks arms). She often says a word three times.
- Mo and Bo (voiced by Laaibah Alvi and Leo Orgil, respectively) are twin cat-like Fuzzlies who talk in rhyme, with stretchy torsos that allow them to reach things several feet high, and to slingshot stuff. They also have retractable heads and limbs, the ability to grow multiple extra pairs of legs in the middle, and heads that light up. Mo is a white female while Bo is a black male.
- Harriet Bouffant (voiced by Hattie Kragten) is a ragdoll-like Fuzzly with extendable pink and yellow hair which can be used as extra limbs. When her extended hair gets long enough, it can detach, leaving only a normal size portion on her head.
- Squeaky Peepers are an octet of small, helium-voiced, rainbow-coloured singing rabbit-like Fuzzlies. Their names are in this order: Big Do (the purple peeper), Re (red), Mi (orange), Fa (yellow with glasses), So (green), La (blue), Ti (indigo), and Little Do (small and pink, sometimes with a blue pacifier in her mouth).
- Grumbles (voiced by Kaden Stephen) is a large purple meerkat-like Fuzzly who has the power to transform into anything. Abby met him in the wilderness, and thought he was some folklore creature.
- Mumbles (voiced by Ian Ho) is a small dark blue meerkat-like Fuzzly who is one of Grumbles' younger cousins. There are rules on how to raise him, and doing any rule wrong would cause him to multiply.
- Blossom Band are a quartet of plant-like Fuzzlies who like playing music. Their names are Tulip (voiced by Gracen Daly), Rose (voiced by Molly Lewis), Sweet Pea (voiced by Beatrice Schneider), and Daisy (voiced by Jackson Reid). Tulip, Rose, and Sweet Pea are female, while Daisy is male. Tulip plays a saxophone, Rose plays an electric guitar, Sweet Pea plays maracas, and Daisy plays a keytar.

==== Humans ====
- Chef Jeff (voiced by Paul Sun-Hyung Lee) is the diminutive chef of Abby's hotel. Chef Jeff is also the subject of a running gag where Abby, in her tricycle, passes by the kitchen where he is working on a dish, therefore resulting a comical accident, but he would nonetheless enjoy or find something positive about it. Besides a chef, he is also a tuba player. He has a mother who is a chef too.
- Miranda Hatcher (voiced by Josette Jorge) is Abby's Chinese mother who works as the hotel gardener.
- Lex Hatcher (voiced by Terry McGurrin) is Abby's Canadian father who works at the front desk, and fixes things in the hotel when they break.
- Melvin (voiced by Christian Campbell in North America and Eden Lawrence in the UK) is Mrs. Melvin's four-year-old son who is an animal fanatic. He owns a pet cat named Elvin.
- Mrs. Melvin (voiced by Kim Roberts) is the hotel salon's hairstylist and Melvin's mother.
- Mr. Melvin (voiced by Mac Heywood) is Mrs. Melvin's husband and Melvin's father.
- Judge Thorn (voiced by Catherine Disher) is a local judge of contests and events. Judge Thorn has a slight resemblance to Carol Burnett. She is also a TV personality.
- Wai Po (voiced by Jane Luk) is Abby's grandmother and Miranda's mother from China. Despite her age, she is quite athletic.
- Allen and Jeffrey are two men who are seen wandering around outside.

==== Animals ====
- Elvin (voiced by Shayle Simons) is Melvin's pet cat.
- Sparkles is Princess Flug's pet slug.
- Portia is Chef Jeff's pet fish.

== See also ==
- Rubble & Crew
- PAW Patrol
