= List of Abby Hatcher episodes =

The following is a list of episodes from the series Abby Hatcher.

== Series overview ==
Season	Episodes	Segments	Originally released	
Season	Episodes	Segments	First released	Last released
1	26	51	January 1, 2019	February 16, 2020
2	26	49	March 8, 2020	April 2, 2022

== Episodes ==
=== Season 1 (2019–20) ===
No. overall	No. in season	Title	Written by	Original release date	Prod. code	U.S. viewers (millions)
1a	1a	"When Abby Met Bozzly"	Rob Hoegee	January 1, 2019	108A	1.08
Abby and Bozzly meet each other for the first time. Note: This is the pilot episode and the first time Abby gears up alone.
1b	1b	"Hair Flair Everywhere"	Alex Mack	January 1, 2019	108B	1.08
Abby and Bozzly help a hair-obsessed Fuzzly look for another job.
2a	2a	"Mo and Bo in the Snow"	Joe Purdy	January 2, 2019	110A	0.95
Mo and Bo are covered in snow and are mistaken for a snow monster.
2b	2b	"Otis Out of Order"	Dan Smith	January 2, 2019	110B	0.95
Otis bruises one of his head tentacles, and develops a fear of heights.
3a	3a	"There's Only One Bozzly"	Story by : Kristofer Wellman; Teleplay by : Jack Monaco	January 3, 2019	105A	0.94
Melvin takes up Bozzly's place for the day after the Fuzzly sprains his leg. Note: This is the only time someone other than Bozzly gears up with Abby.
3b	3b	"Cousin Flugtilda"	Lisa Kettle	January 3, 2019	105B	0.94
Princess Flug's cousin Flugtilda visits her at the hotel, and she’s jealous when she gets all the attention.
4a	4a	"Princess Flug's Flower Float"	Joe Purdy	January 7, 2019	102A	0.82
Flower petals help Abby lead to Princess Flug, the flower-obsessed Fuzzly.
4b	4b	"The Fuzzlies' Talent Show"	Elise Allen	January 7, 2019	102B	0.82
Teeny Terry thinks he doesn't have any talent, so Abby helps him out before the hotel's Talent Show.
5a	5a	"Too Tired to Tuba"	Alex Mack	January 8, 2019	103A	0.75
The Fuzzlies can't sleep due to Chef Jeff practising his tuba overnight.
5b	5b	"Princess Flug Day"	Jack Monaco	January 8, 2019	103B	0.75
Princess Flug is thought to have a party involving her by Melvin.
6a	6a	"Hair Flair Fuzzly"	Corey Powell	January 9, 2019	104A	0.64
Mrs. Melvin's brush is missing and Abby retrieves it with the help of a hair-obsessed Fuzzly — Harriet.
6b	6b	"The Fuzzlies in the Attic"	Story by : Danielle Koenig; Teleplay by : Jack Monaco	January 9, 2019	104B	0.64
Mo and Bo, the Fuzzly Twins, are separated and Abby scatters around the hotel to find them.
7a	7a	"Afraid of Cats"	Kristen McGregor	January 10, 2019	106A	0.64 (Note: The episode was aired as a sneak peek on December 31, 2018. The viewership is 1.07 million viewers.)
Abby helps the Fuzzlies out on a kitten that Melvin brought home they didn't like.
7b	7b	"Chef Curly"	Jack Monaco	January 10, 2019	106B	0.64
Chef Jeff thinks Curly is messing up the kitchen not knowing she's helping him set up an important dinner.
8a	8a	"Curly and the Sock Doll"	Alex Mack	January 28, 2019	107A	0.73
Chef Jeff is bothered by Curly's sock doll which lets out a foul smell but Curly is reluctant to part ways with it.
8b	8b	"In the Park"	Joe Purdy	January 29, 2019	107B	0.61
When the rain stops, Abby and the Fuzzlies go out to play at the park. Princess Flug, however, refuses to go because of fear of getting covered in mud.
9a	9a	"Teeny Terry's Gift"	Lisa Kettle	January 30, 2019	111A	1.02
Lex assigns Teeny Terry to repair some things in the hotel which he finds to do hard on his own.
9b	9b	"Peeper Time Blues"	Kristen McGregor	January 31, 2019	111B	0.77
The Peepers become sad when their bed ends up missing, but Abby and Bozzly don't know why.
10a	10a	"Abby's Squeaky Peeper Panic"	Elise Allen	February 11, 2019 (Note: This episode was released early on the Nick Jr. app, VOD, and iTunes on December 17, 2018.)	101A	0.71
The littlest Squeaky Peeper is missing, and Abby and Bozzly search for her.
10b	10b	"Things That Go Ding in the Night"	Jack Monaco	February 12, 2019	101B	0.65
Strange noises keep guests up, and Abby figures out that the button-collecting Otis is what caused it.
11a	11a	"Teeny Terry's Treehouse"	John Phillip Loy	February 13, 2019	109B	0.72
Princess Flug and Otis have bedrooms that match their style. Because of this, Teeny Terry wishes he too has a bedroom to call his own, but Abby doesn't listen to his thoughts.
11b	11b	"Hearts and Hugs Day"	Corey Powell	February 14, 2019	109A	0.65
Otis is in doubt on how to show appreciation for Hearts and Hugs Day. Abby and the other Fuzzlies decide to give him ideas.
12a	12a	"Secret Basement Disco"	Corey Powell	March 18, 2019	112A	0.59
Abby and Bozzly want to help Harriet overcome her shyness about her favorite activity.
12b	12b	"Frazzled Fuzzly"	Jack Monaco	March 19, 2019	112B	0.53
Teeny Terry worries that he's too tiny to be helpful.
13a	13a	"Fuzzly Slumber Party"	John Phillip Loy	March 20, 2019	114A	0.67
The Fuzzlies are scared when they think there's a monster lurking around the hotel.
13b	13b	"Fix It Flug"	Alex Mack	March 21, 2019	114B	0.54
Princess Flug successfully helps Lex and Teeny Terry with her glitter goo, then goes overboard and fixes everything in the hotel.
14a	14a	"Princess Flug's Flowery Adventure"	Kristen McGregor	May 20, 2019	115A	0.50
Princess Flug gets lost in the laundry and ends up on a wild crosstown adventure.
14b	14b	"Fuzzliest Dinner"	Corey Powell	May 20, 2019	115B	0.50
When Chef Jeff needs to leave the hotel, Abby enlists Curly and Bozzly to help her make dinner.
15a	15a	"Princess Flug's Pet Slug"	Kristen McGregor	May 21, 2019	116A	0.47
Princess Flug finds a slug and wants it to be her pet.
15b	15b	"Fuzzly Photo Day"	Kristin Jarrett	May 22, 2019	116B	0.39
Abby wants to send a picture of her and the Fuzzlies to her Wai Po, but it's impossible to get all the Fuzzlies together for a perfect picture.
16a	16a	"Fairy Tale Fuzzly"	Kristen McGregor	May 23, 2019	117A	0.48
Harriet Bouffant is stuck in the tower, and Abby and Bozzly must save her.
16b	16b	"Super Secret Passageway"	Story by : J.D. Smith; Teleplay by : Peter Hunziker	June 18, 2019	117B	0.43
Abby and Bozzly help Otis improve his Hide and Seek skills, and they all wind up stuck in an undiscovered secret passageway.
17a	17a	"Teeny Pelican Terry"	Corey Powell	June 17, 2019	119A	0.63
A mama pelican thinks Teeny Terry is a baby bird and adopts him.
17b	17b	"Tappin Mo and Bo"	John Phillip Loy	June 17, 2019	119B	0.63
Mo and Bo discover tap dancing, but the sound is disturbing everyone in the hotel.
18a	18a	"Grumbles' First Haircut"	Kristin Jarrett	June 19, 2019	121A	0.61
Grumbles needs a haircut, but is afraid to get one.
18b	18b	"Fuzzly Ball"	Joe Purdy	June 20, 2019	121B	0.58
Abby and the Fuzzlies try to throw the perfect ball for Miranda and Lex when they aren't allowed to go to one themselves.
19	19	"The Fuzzlies Camping Trip"	John Phillip Loy	July 5, 2019	118	0.67
While on a camping trip, Abby and the Fuzzlies meet a new Fuzzly, Grumbles.
20a	20a	"Snug Loving Chipmunks"	Kristin Jarrett	September 15, 2019 (Note: This episode first aired in Canada on July 14, 2019.)	122A	0.33
Chipmunks steal Teeny Terry's acorn snug and Abby and Bozzly need to get it back. Note: This episode aired on the Nick Jr. channel.
20b	20b	"Abby's Snug"	Peter Hunziker	September 15, 2019 (Note: This episode first aired in Canada on July 14, 2019.)	122B	0.33
When Melvin sleeps over in Abby's room and disturbs her, Abby tries to find another place to bunk for the night. Note 1: This episode aired on the Nick Jr. channel. Note 2: This is the second episode where Abby gears up alone. Note 3: This is the first time someone other than Abby does a brain spark.
21a	21a	"Trick or Treat Otis"	Joe Purdy	October 4, 2019 (Note: This episode first aired in Canada on July 11, 2019.)	113A	0.58
Otis gets separated from the others on Halloween and is mistaken for a dog because of his costume.
21b	21b	"Bedtime for Peepers"	Dan Smith	October 4, 2019 (Note: This episode first aired in Canada on August 6, 2019.)	113B	0.58
Abby tries to get the overly energized Squeaky Peepers to bed to stop them from ruining a grown-up party in the hotel. Note: This is the third episode where Abby gears up alone.
22a	22a	"Otis on the Go"	J.D. Smith	November 1, 2019 (Note: This episode first aired in Canada on July 20, 2019.)	123A	0.53
Otis takes off on Abby's modified bike and Abby and Bozzly must save him.
22b	22b	"Abby's Afraid"	Corey Powell	November 1, 2019 (Note: This episode first aired in Canada on July 20, 2019.)	123B	0.53
Abby is afraid to see the dentist after she gets a loose tooth, and the Fuzzlies must help her face her fear.
23a	23a	"Shape of Grumbles"	Kristin Jarrett	November 10, 2019	124A	0.32
Grumbles starts morphing constantly after getting hiccups.
23b	23b	"Wai Po's Wild Day"	John Phillip Loy	November 10, 2019	124B	0.32
Wai Po is now at Abby's hotel. She goes on to play games with Abby and the Fuzzlies.
24a	24a	"Abby Loses Elvin"	Kristin Jarrett	December 1, 2019	125A	0.33
Abby tries to kitty-sit Elvin, but the kitten keeps running off and disappearing.
24b	24b	"The Berry Thief"	John Phillip Loy	December 1, 2019	125B	0.33
Abby has to stop a chipmunk from stealing the blueberries in the hotel garden.
25a	25a	"Fuzzlies' New Year Dragon"	Peter Hunziker	January 19, 2020	120A	0.33
Abby and the Fuzzlies practice the dragon dance to entertain Wai Po, and celebrate Chinese New Year.
25b	25b	"Full Moon Fuzzly"	Joe Purdy	January 19, 2020	120B	0.33
When Abby tells Teeny Terry that there is someone on the moon, he becomes curious and tries to go there.
26a	26a	"Grumbles Gets Gone"	Corey Powell	February 16, 2020	126A	0.36
Grumbles is too bashful to come across new people.
26b	26b	"Here an Abby, There an Abby"	Peter Hunziker	February 16, 2020	126B	0.36
Hotel members want Abby's assistance simultaneously and its up to Abby to come up with a solution to help everyone out.

=== Season 2 (2020–22) ===
No. overall	No. in season	Title	Written by	Original release date	Prod. code	U.S. viewers (millions)
27a	1a	"Peeper Transport Tubes"	John Phillip Loy	March 8, 2020	201A	0.31
The Peepers deliver stuff around the hotel through a series of tubes. It goes well until they mix up their deliveries and get jammed at the intersection.
27b	1b	"Abby Loses Her Glasses"	Peter Hunziker	March 8, 2020	201B	0.31
Abby's glasses get knocked off her face by a ball, and get carried away by a series of animals. She struggles to see as a result.
28a	2a	"Game Time with Mo and Bo"	Dan Danko	April 5, 2020	203A	0.42
Mo and Bo are heavily focused on video snakes and ladders on a tablet, thus they cause some trouble when they play and walk simultaneously.
28b	2b	"Grumbles Goes Down the Drain"	Deanna Oliver	April 5, 2020	203B	0.42
Grumbles bathes in Abby's bath tub but suddenly thins, and get pulled into the drain where he travels through pipes across the hotel.
29a	3a	"Teeny Terry is... TeenyMan!"	Gus Constantellis	April 12, 2020	202A	0.26
Teeny Terry wants to be a hero but he lacks confidence. Thus Abby decides to secretly help him by doing heroic acts but making him think he does them.
29b	3b	"Mo and Bo and the Missing Button Trail"	Rachel Lipman	April 12, 2020	202B	0.26
Abby and some of her Fuzzly pals have a walk in the woods, and drop buttons to mark their path. But they get lost when the buttons get covered in snow.
30a	4a	"Mo and Bo on a Roll"	Rachel Lipman	April 19, 2020	204A	0.39
Mo and Bo put on roller skates, but their being new to the equipment causes them to roll away for miles.
30b	4b	"Dance Dance Grumbles"	Peter Hunziker	April 19, 2020	204B	0.39
Abby and Bozzly try to teach Grumbles how to dance.
31a	5a	"Super Strength Curly"	Gus Constantellis	May 17, 2020	205A	0.37
Princess Flug inadvertently puts glitter goo into a gelatin mix which greatly strengthens anyone who consumes it.
31b	5b	"Super Sitter Abby"	Craig Shemin	May 17, 2020	205B	0.37
Grumbles has an infant cousin who visits the hotel, and Abby tries to be a good caretaker.
32a	6a	"Otis and the Snack Machine"	Deanna Oliver	May 24, 2020	206A	0.33
A snack dispenser is added to Abby's hotel. Everyone is amazed is except Chef Jeff who is saddened that his delicacies are being overlooked.
32b	6b	"Abby's Runaway Care Case"	Story by : Peter Hunziker; Teleplay by : Alex Ganetakos	May 24, 2020	206B	0.33
After Abby and Bozzly helped a number of Fuzzlies, Teeny Terry turns Abby's bag into a robot to deal with Fuzzly problems so the two can relax.
33a	7a	"Little Doh's Lost Binky"	Deanna Oliver	June 21, 2020	207A	N/A
One of the Peepers' pacifier finds its way out of the hotel, causing all of them to go bonkers.
33b	7b	"Chef Beth"	Craig Shemin	June 21, 2020	207B	N/A
The mother of Chef Jeff is visiting the hotel, and Chef Jeff wants to impress her with a perfect party, but all she'd rather do is spend some quiet time with her son.
34a	8a	"Teeny Terry's Perfect Sport"	Jamie Whitney	June 28, 2020	208A	0.36
Abby and Bozzly look for a sport that would suit Teeny Terry's size.
34b	8b	"Abby's Track and Field Day"	Angela Salt	June 28, 2020	208B	0.36
Abby is signed up by her mother to enter a track and field event, thus she has to choose which competition to be at so she pops the hot air balloon and hurts the adult boy and the woman.
35a	9a	"Abby and the Costume Ball"	Gus Constantellis	July 5, 2020	209A	0.27
The hotel holds a costume party where the household dons some cutesy outfits, but Abby's costumes keep getting ruined.
35b	9b	"Big Terry: Fix-It Fuzzly"	Jennifer Skelly	July 5, 2020	209B	0.27
Grumbles is interested in Teeny Terry's fixing job, and goes as far as doing a few repairs, and shaping himself like the latter. Teeny Terry feels insignificant when Lex starts fixing stuff with Grumbles.
36a	10a	"Otis' Sick Day"	John Phillip Loy	July 26, 2020	210A	0.29
Otis hurts his tentacles after some trouble in the elevator, and has to rest.
36b	10b	"Lights, Camera, Fuzzles"	Craig Shemin	July 26, 2020	210B	0.29
Judge Thorn is having the hotel filmed for a chance to be featured on television.
37	11	"Fuzzly Beach Day"	John Phillip Loy	August 2, 2020	211	0.31
Abby and the Fuzzlies are having a beach party. Everybody is excited, except Otis who is hydrophobic.
38a	12a	"A Princess and the Peepers"	Brian Clark	September 13, 2020	212A	0.41
Princess Flug wants to sleep but she keeps getting kicked by tiny leporids hidden in her blanket.
38b	12b	"The Perfect Job for Mo and Bo"	Alex Ganetakos	September 13, 2020	212B	0.41
Mo and Bo are interested in having a task in the hotel.
39a	13a	"Teeny Terry: Safety Officer"	Sara Jane Sluke and Hilary Cherniss	September 20, 2020	214A	0.40
An emergency alarm is added to the hotel, though Teeny Terry is using it to make drills.
39b	13b	"Abby Babysits Melvin"	Brian Clark	September 20, 2020	214B	0.40
Mr. and Mrs. Melvin go on a day-long trip, but they decide to leave their son at the hotel. Abby and the Fuzzles try their best to keep him company.
40a	14a	"Princess Flug Goes Skiing"	Gus Constantellis	September 27, 2020	215A	0.29
Princess Flug tries some skiing. Although she is inexperienced with the activity, she still bothers as pretty much everybody is outdoors.
40b	14b	"Mo and Bo's Art Show"	John Phillip Loy	September 27, 2020	215B	0.29
Mo and Bo have their eyes on a pair of boots embedded with quartz, thus they enter an art competition where the boots are up for grabs.
41	15	"The Blossom Band"	Sara Jane Sluke and Hilary Cherniss	October 18, 2020	216	0.27
Princess Flug sows four weird plant bulbs which later grow into more anthropomorphic plants.
42a	16a	"Mo and Bo Hit the Road"	Brian Clark	October 25, 2020	217A	0.21
Mo and Bo are off to see huge tap shoes at a park, but they only have so many minutes before it is closed.
42b	16b	"Happy Fuzzly Birthday"	Sara Jane Sluke and Hilary Cherniss	October 25, 2020	217B	0.21
The Fuzzlies want to offer gifts for Abby's birthday party, but they have differing ideas which get into each other's way.
43a	17a	"Bozzly and the Baby"	Alex Ganetakos	November 22, 2020	219A	0.23
Allen and Jeffrey bring their niece to the hatcher palace hotel while her mother is away and she is interested in toying with Bozzly's ears, but he finds it unpleasant.
43b	17b	"Fuzzly Lemonade Stand"	Gus Constantellis	November 22, 2020	219B	0.23
Melvin puts up a lemonade stand outside the hotel but is empty of the beverage and Abby and Bozzly decide to help their friend make more lemonade.
44	18	"A Very Fuzzly Christmas"	Story by : J.D. Smith; Teleplay by : John Phillip Loy	December 6, 2020	218	0.29
Abby's hotel is putting up a Christmas party where guests would receive treats and gifts. But because an incoming snowstorm prevents visitors from coming, Abby and the Fuzzlies resort to making deliveries.
45a	19a	"Teeny Terry Takes Off"	John Phillip Loy	December 13, 2020	220A	0.35
Teeny Terry makes some upgrades to his snug.
45b	19b	"Grumbles the Squeaky Peeper"	John Phillip Loy	December 13, 2020	220B	0.35
Big Do loses his voice and has Grumbles take his place in a video-take for Judge Thorn's TV show.
46a	20a	"Mo and Bo, Where'd They Go?"	Dan Danko	December 27, 2020	221A	0.24
While in downtown, Mo and Bo accidentally part ways with Abby and meet a girl named Sophie.
46b	20b	"Abby and the Winning Fuzzlies"	Craig Shemin	December 27, 2020	221B	0.24
Mo and Bo win a hotel lottery which they get to have anything they please for a day.
47a	21a	"Mo and Bo Go Toe to Toe"	Sara Jane Sluke and Hilary Cherniss	January 3, 2021	222A	0.24
Mo wants to play follow-the-leader, but Bo wants to do rollerskating. Thus they separate and take other playmates.
47b	21b	"Abby and the Rooftop Playground"	Gus Constantellis	January 3, 2021	222B	0.24
Teeny Terry and Princess Flug want to have different playround things on top of Abby's hotel.
48a	22a	"Blossom Band on Tour"	Deanna Oliver	January 24, 2021	223A	0.28
Abby takes the Blossom Band to play in a number of places in the city, but she keeps messing up the shows.
48b	22b	"Abby's Old Toys"	Alex Ganetakos	January 24, 2021	223B	0.28
Abby must find a way to play with her little kid toys, or her mother will put them up for donation.
49a	23a	"Blossom Band and the Rock 'n' Rolling Stage"	John Phillip Loy	February 7, 2021	224A	0.34
The Flower Fuzzlies try to win the hotel flower contest.
49b	23b	"The Squeaky Peeper Prize"	Alex Ganetakos	February 7, 2021	224B	0.34
Little Do gets lost at the carnival and mistaken for a toy.
50a	24a	"Bozzly and the Missing Pillbug"	Craig Shemin	February 21, 2021	225A	0.25
Bozzly loses his pill bug toy and Abby is determined to find it, unaware it was found by Mrs. Melvin.
50b	24b	"Grumbles' Family Reunion"	Brian Clark	February 21, 2021	225B	0.25
Abby wants to surprise Grumbles with a visit from his family.
51a	25a	"Blossom Band Break Up"	Dan Danko	March 7, 2021	226A	0.34
The Flower Fuzzlies get into a fight and split up.
51b	25b	"Abby's Quick Fix"	Brian Clark	March 7, 2021	226B	0.34
The Squeaky Peepers get trapped in the fuzzly passageways during a flood.
52a	26a	"Abby's Farm Animal Friend"	Dan Danko	April 2, 2022	213A	0.10
Abby visits farmer Jo's farm.
52b	26b	"The Princess Flug Bug"	Rachel Lipman	April 2, 2022	213B	0.10
Princess Flug pretends to be sick.

=== Shorts (2020) ===
No. overall	No. in season	Title	Directed by	Written by	Original release date	Prod. code
1	1	"Abby Gives a Tour"	Unknown	Unknown	April 26, 2020	101
Abby and her cameraman Bozzly gives the viewers a brief tour of the hotel.
2	2	"The Princess Flug Challenge"	Unknown	Unknown	May 3, 2020	102
Abby and Bozzly use random stuff to try to make a sticky and sparkly material like what Princess Flug possesses. But they need to do so as soon as possible lest a sack of Princess Flug's material above them will burst and cover them.
3	3	"Aced It!"	Unknown	Unknown	May 10, 2020	103
Abby and Bozzly attempt to make a smoothie similar to what Chef Jeff made, but they must make it under a time limit.
4	4	"Awesome Adventure Race"	Unknown	Unknown	May 31, 2020	104
Abby challenges Princess Flug in an obstacle race.
5	5	"What's Squishy in the Box"	Unknown	Unknown	June 7, 2020	105
Abby and Bozzly try to guess random soft things in a box. Their only hint in figuring the soft thing is by touching it through the box's holes.
6	6	"Abby's Splizzacular Dance-Off"	Unknown	Unknown	June 14, 2020	106
Abby and Bozzly take on each other in a dance contest.
7	7	"Fuzzly Treasure Hunt"	Unknown	Unknown	July 12, 2020	107
On her birthday, Abby is on a quest where she must pick up a series of clues that would lead her to a surprise.
8	8	"Who Knows That Smell"	Unknown	Unknown	July 19, 2020	108
Abby and Bozzly contests each other where they have to identify things by smelling them.
9	9	"Not My Fuzzly Arms"	Unknown	Unknown	August 9, 2020	109
Abby and Bozzly compete in trying to decorate a cake similar to the one made by Chef Jeff. However, each of them has to use the arms of someone behind them.
10	10	"The Great Fuzzly Challenge"	Unknown	Unknown	August 16, 2020	110
Abby and Bozzly compete in doing various acts come up by Melvin. Whoever loses the most will have pink paste poured on him/her.
