= Shayan TV =

Russian Tatar-language children's television channel

- Country: Tatarstan, Russia
- Headquarters: Kazan, Tatarstan

Ownership
- Owner: Tatarstan State Television Broadcasting Company "New century"

History
- Launched: 12 November 2018; 7 years ago

Links
- Website: shayantv.ru/en

Shayan TV (Tatar: Шаян ТВ, romanized: Şayan TV) is the first kids and teen's entertainment channel in the Tatar language to be available in Russia (through the Internet) with 24-hour broadcasting.

== History ==
Supported by the President of Tatarstan Republic, the channel was launched in Tatarstan Republic on 12 November 2018 as the first Tatar channel for kids and teens.

== Contemporary programming ==
The channel offers more than 20 original educational and learning programs, game shows and quizzes, animated films (popular science, documentary, feature films) dubbed in Tatar for audiences from 3 to 15 years old.

== Shayan Channels services ==
- The channel has apps on both Google Play and App Store.
- The channel has a YouTube channel, where videos from television series and films are posted.
- The official website of the channel works in Tatar, Russian and English languages and gives an ability to follow the channel 24 hours all over the World.

== Awards ==
- Shayan TV is the winner of the contest "The main heroes - 2019" (held by Carousel International) in nomination "The discovery of the year".
- Shayan TV won the first place in the 10th World internet-projects contest "The Knowledge Pearls" ("Belem cäwhärläre") in nominations "The most popular and useful project in the fields of culture and education" and "The most popular and useful Tatar app".
- The channel's program "Kaleb" (English: "The soul") became the winner of the 9-th All-Russian journalists and mass media contest in the nomination "The best achievements on the subject of lifestyle and activities of Tatar nation in mass media".
