= Crush =

Crush commonly refers to:

- Crush or crushing, destructive compression as by a crusher
  - Crushing (execution), a torturous method of execution
  - Crush injury, an injury by an object that causes compression of the body
  - Crush syndrome, major shock and kidney failure after a crushing injury
- Infatuation or limerence, romantic attraction to another person
  - Puppy love, feelings of love, romance, or infatuation felt by young people

Crush may also refer to:

== Arts and media ==
=== Film ===
- Crush (1972 film), a Hong Kong film
- Crush (1992 film), a New Zealand film by Alison Maclean
- The Crush (1993 film), by Alan Shapiro, starring Cary Elwes and Alicia Silverstone
- Crush (2001 film), by John McKay, starring Andie MacDowell
- Crush (2009 film), by John V. Soto, starring Christopher Egan
- Crush (2009 Russian film)
- The Crush (2010 film), a short film by Michael Creagh
- Crush (2013 film), an American film by Malik Bader, starring Crystal Reed
- Crush (2014 film), an Indonesian film
- Crush (2022 film), an American film by Sammi Cohen, starring Rowan Blanchard
- Crush, a green sea turtle character in the Finding Nemo franchise

=== Music ===
==== Artists ====
- Crush (rock band), a 1990–1993 American/English alternative rock band
- Crush (British group), a 1990s pop duo featuring Jayni Hoy and Donna Air from Byker Grove
- Crush (Canadian band), a 2000–2006 band
- Crush (Turkish band), a Turkish boyband
- Crush (singer) (born 1992), South Korean R&B and hip-hop singer

==== Albums ====
- Crush (2NE1 album) or the title song, 2014
- Crush (Abe Vigoda album) or the title song, 2010
- Crush (Bon Jovi album), 2000
- Crush (Doughboys album), 1993
- Crush (Floating Points album), 2019
- Crush (Orchestral Manoeuvres in the Dark album) or the title song, 1985
- Crush (EP), by Ravyn Lenae, 2018
- Crush, by IQ, 2008
- Crush, by Lettuce, 2015
- The Crush, by Anomie Belle, 2011
- Crushes (The Covers Mixtape), by Mates of State, 2010
- Crushin', by the Fat Boys, or the title song, 1987
- Crushing (album), by Julia Jacklin, 2019

==== Songs ====
- "Crush" (Dave Matthews Band song), 1998
- "Crush" (David Archuleta song), 2008
- "Crush" (Ethel Cain song), 2021
- "Crush" (Fugative song), 2010
- "Crush" (Grace Jones song), 1987
- "Crush" (I.O.I song), 2016
- "Crush" (Jennifer Paige song), 1998
- "Crush" (Klava Koka song), 2020
- "Crush" (Mandy Moore song), 2001
- "Crush" (Paul van Dyk song), 2004
- "Crush" (Pendulum song), 2011
- "Crush" (Playboi Carti and Travis Scott song), 2025
- "Crush" (Yuna song), 2016
- "Crush" (Zara Larsson song), 2025
- "Crush" (Zerobaseone song), 2023
- "Crush (1980 Me)", by Darren Hayes, 2003
- "C.R.U.S.H.", by Ciara from Ciara: The Evolution, 2006
- "Crush", by 16volt from LetDownCrush, 1996
- "Crush", by Amerie from Because I Love It, 2007
- "Crush", by Anthrax from Volume 8: The Threat Is Real, 1998
- "Crush", by Avril Lavigne from Head Above Water, 2019
- "Crush", by Carys from To Anyone Like Me, 2020
- "Crush", by Frank Klepacki from the Command & Conquer: Red Alert video game soundtrack, 1996
- "Crush", by Frankie J, 2009
- "Crush", by Gavin DeGraw from Chariot, 2003
- "Crush", by GFriend from The Awakening, 2017
- "Crush", by Ive from Alive, 2024
- "Crush", by Jimmy Eat World from Clarity, 1999
- "Crush", by Katy Perry from 143, 2024
- "Crush", by Lila McCann from Something in the Air, 1999
- "Crush", by Mario Judah, 2020
- "Crush", by MCND, 2021
- "Crush", by Selena Gomez & the Scene from Kiss & Tell, 2009
- "Crush", by Seventeen from Attacca, 2021
- "Crush", by Sleigh Bells from Reign of Terror, 2012
- "Crush", by the Smashing Pumpkins from Gish, 1991
- "Crush", by Solange Knowles from Solo Star, 2002
- "Crush", by Stereophonics from Pull the Pin, 2007
- "Crush", by Taemin from Eternal, 2024
- "Crush", by Tall Dwarfs from Slugbucket Hairybreath Monster, 1984
- "Crush", by Tessa Violet from Bad Ideas, 2019
- "Crush", by Weki Meki from Kiss, Kicks, 2019
- "Crush", by Zhane from Saturday Night, 1997
- "The Crush", by John Hiatt on Warming Up to the Ice Age, 1985
  - Also recorded by JJ White, 1990
- "The Crush", by Parokya ni Edgar from Khangkhungkherrnitz, 1996

==== Companies ====
- Crush Management

=== Television ===
- Crush (U.S. game show), a game show hosted by Andrew Krasny
- "Crush" (Buffy the Vampire Slayer), a 2001 episode of Buffy the Vampire Slayer
- "Crush" (Haven), an episode of Haven
- "Crush", an episode of Heartstopper
- "Crush", an episode of Kim Possible
- "Crush", an episode of the Law & Order: Special Victims Unit
- "Crush", an episode of Smallville
- Crush, gladiator on the American Gladiators series
- Crush, a character in the series Rusty Rivets

=== Other media ===
- Crush (comics), a 2003 series of comics
- Crush (video game), 2007
- Crush (Richard Siken), a collection of poetry by Richard Siken
- Crush (DC Comics), a fictional character from DC Comics

== People ==
- Crush (singer), from South Korea
- Brian Adams (wrestler) or Crush (1964–2007), American professional wrestler
- Gina Carano or Crush (born 1982), American mixed martial arts fighter

== Technology ==
- Cattle crush, a standing stock or cage for restraining livestock
- Crush, an engineering term for preload that deforms a part

== Organizations and brands ==
- Crush (soft drink)
- Camel Crush, a brand of cigarettes
- Criminal Reduction Utilising Statistical History or CRUSH, an IBM predictive analytics system
- NVIDIA's nForce chipset for the Athlon processor (codename "Crush")
- Gas (app), an American social media app formerly called Crush

=== Sports ===
- Colorado Crush, an American football team
- CRUSH, a women's professional wrestling organization

== Other uses ==
- Crush, Texas, a temporary "city" established as a one-day publicity stunt in 1896
- Crush fetish, a fetish in which sexual arousal is associated with observing objects being crushed or being crushed oneself
- Crowd crush, large group of people pressed together
- Crush or crushing, the initial step of winemaking

== See also ==
- Crush 40, a Japanese-American band featured in the Sonic the Hedgehog video game franchise
- "crushcrushcrush", a 2007 song by Paramore
- Crushed (disambiguation)
- Crushed black, where shadow detail is lost and rendered as black areas
- Crusher (disambiguation)
- Krush (disambiguation)
- Love (disambiguation)
