= Metal Cardbot =

South Korean TV series

- Also known as: Metal Cardbot S (season 2); Metal Cardbot W (season 3)
- Hangul: 메탈카드봇
- RR: Metalkadeubot
- MR: Met'alk'adŭbot
- Genre: Action; Adventure; Mecha; Science fiction
- Written by: Ryōta Yamaguchi
- Country of origin: South Korea
- Original language: Korean
- No. of seasons: 3
- No. of episodes: 56

Production
- Running time: 11 minutes
- Production company: SAMG Entertainment

Original release
- Network: Daekyo Kids TV
- Release: March 29, 2023 – present

Metal Cardbot (Korean: 메탈카드봇) is a South Korean animated children's television series produced by SAMG Entertainment. The series is written by Ryōta Yamaguchi, who has penned scripts for anime such as Medabots, Digimon Data Squad, The Vision of Escaflowne, as well as fellow SAMG-produced series, Catch! Teenieping. The series premiered on Daekyo Kids TV on March 29, 2023. A second season, Metal Cardbot S, aired from September 10, 2024 to September 3, 2025. A third season, Metal Cardbot W, premiered on December 4, 2025.

== Premise ==
The series follows Jun Grant, a young boy in the fictional city of Mowtown, as he gets involved with the Metal Cardbots, mechanical alien lifeforms who took refuge on Earth after the destruction of their homeworld, the planet Machina. After crossing paths with a pair of Cardbots fighting each other, Jun finds a mysterious wrist device, the Metal Breath, and eventually gets roped into helping Blue Cop, a police car Cardbot, round up the more disagreeable members of his kind, in the hopes that they could coexist with humanity. As they continue their task while attempting to keep the Cardbots' existence a secret, Jun's friends, colleagues, and eventually even his parents are let in on the secret of the Cardbots, with the stakes rising higher as criminals and other significant figures in Cardbot society begin making their moves.

== Characters ==
=== Main ===
- Jun Grant (Korean: 준 그랜트; RR: Jun Geulaenteu)

Voiced by: Jang Yena

A young 14 year old blue-haired boy who enjoys being a hero and is an avid bmx enthusiast. The main wielder of the Metal Breath, Jun, for all of his immature, hot-headed, and selfish behavior, is kind-hearted and always strives to help those in need and make new friends, though he doesn't tolerate actively malicious people. He is the primary human character of the series.

- Blue Cop (Korean: 블루캅; RR: Beullu Kab)

Voiced by: Kwak Yoon-sang

A blue, white, and yellow Cardbot who in all forms transforms into a police car. A member of the Star Guardians - the premier security team of the Cardbots' homeworld - Blue Cop puts on a stoic facade but is as fallible as Jun in multiple instances. He gets upgraded into Blue Cop S in the second season and Blue Cop W in the third season, and in the first and second seasons gains the ability to become Ultimate Blue Cop, formed from combining the powers of 10 other Cardbots (which has 4 metal cards that become two gauntlets and boots), and Blue Cop Trinity, where he combines with an Armored Personnel Carrier and a bus modified as a prisoner transport vehicle (which has a greatsword that can transform into a rifle). His metal card weapon in his default forms are all large gauntlets with wrist-mounted cannons, with his subsequent upgrades supplementing these with additional armor for his chest.

Teo (Korean: 테오)

Voiced by: Kim Eun-ah

A short, young bespectacled 11 year old boy who is Jun's best friend. Notably more book smart and well-read than Jun, Teo is much more reclusive than him and was originally alone until Jun offered his hand at friendship. He was the second human after Jun to be let into the Cardbots' secrets in his group.

Anna (Korean: 블루캅)

Voiced by: Kim Ga-ryung

A young, 13 year old pink-haired girl and Jun's love interest. The daughter of Jack, Motown's mayor, Anna is kind-hearted and goes out of her way to help others whenever possible. While she does occasionally find Jun's antics tiresome, she still cares for him when the chips are down, and was the third of his friend group to be let in on the Cardbots' secret.

Edo (Korean: 에드)

Voiced by: Hyun Lee

A muscular man and the first human other than Jun to be let in on the Cardbots' existence. The owner and sole staff member of his own auto shop and surrounding junkyard, Edo prides himself on his handiwork and does not enjoy seeing any damage done to either his equipment, his property, or especially his friends. He is the only adult human in the primary cast, originally being wary of the Cardbots before accepting them upon learning of their species-wide refugee status. Since then, he has become the default repairman for Jun's group of Cardbots.

=== Secondary ===
Crest

A young 15 year old teal-haired boy and the son of two major scientists. Incredibly gifted, savvy, and intelligent thanks to the resources at his disposal, Crest retains a polite demeanor and is extremely kind-hearted and willing to help. Despite not wielding a Metal Breath, Crest initially held custody of the Cardbot Wild Guardy and assisted him in his goals of claiming Jun's, though after a series of confrontations, Crest handed him over to Jun, but remains a staunch ally. Most of his subsequent appearances involve using his resources to investigate Cardbot-related cases and report to Jun for extra help.

Sebastion

A maroon and cream-colored monowheeled butler robot assigned to care for Crest by his parents. As such, he regularly follows his commands while serving to keep him safe.

Peruru

Introduced in the second season; a young 13 year old girl from Porcaca island who is descended from Mukara, an ancient tribesman who befriended the crew of the Cardbot starship Speranza when it crashed several centuries ago. A determined young girl with a strong sense of responsibility, Peruru would prove to be just as kind-hearted and energetic as Jun, eventually joining his group after leaving Porcaca to recover the recently-stolen Speranza Cardbots. Originally armed with Mukara's spear, Peruru was unable to use his Metal Breath until the final battle against Flame Nova.

=== Cardbots ===
The titular robotic species the show centers around, distinctive for their digital eyes, which appear in both robot and vehicle form. Aside from the standard Metal Cardbots, the third season would introduce the Wild Cardbots, which are similar but have more animalistic stylings.

==== Season 1 ====
- Mega Trucker

An orange, yellow, black, and silver Cardbot with a head styled after an american football helmet who transforms into a dump truck. A dance enthusiast who loves latin music and just wants to have fun, Mega Trucker was initially a rogue wandering who actively rebelled against the idea of keeping a low profile, often scaring humans who encountered them and risking their safety. He started behaving a lot better after being sealed, though he tends to have some of the worst battlefield luck against particularly nasty opponents. The first Cardbot to be sealed by Jun, Mega Trucker's weapon card is a shoulder-mounted shield that he uses in headlong rushes against the opponent, though it also has the ability to project a large forcefield when charge with the power of other Cardbots.

- Mega Ambler

A white, red, black, and green Cardbot who transforms into a military ambulance. A notorious back-alley doctor whose genuine medical talent was truncated by his tendency to demand near-bankrupting admission prices for his services, Mega Ambler continued his practices on Earth on unsuspecting humans, though the copious layers of grime gained him the nickname of "The Black Ambulance". After being sealed by Jun, Mega Ambler would ultimately become the primary field medic for the team, with the third season later revealing that he served in the war against the Wild Cardbots as a doctor treating casualties. His weapon card is a large pair of forceps mounted on a gauntlet, which have the ability to administer an electric shock that renders the targeted body part on the opponent completely limp.

- Phoenix Fire

A white, red, black, and silver Cardbot who transforms into an airport crash tender fire engine. A renowned emergency service worker back on Machina who even received a commemorative medal for his bravery, Phoenix Fire's escape pod burned up while entering Earth's atmosphere, giving him a severe case of pyrophobia that compelled him to extinguish even the most minuscule fires possible, such as a simple candle, though he eventually got over it after being sealed by Jun. One of the few Cardbots who has access to a weapon outside of their weapon cards, Phoenix Fire's default armament is his vehicle mode's water cannon converted into a handheld firearm, while his weapon card is a gauntlet with a shield at the base and a large sledgehammer at the end.

- Shadow X

A purple, black, and silver ninja-themed Cardbot who transforms into a tiltrotor. A well-known spy on Machina, Shadow X starts out with a rather excessive hatred of Jun Grant, considering him someone who would enslave a Cardbot for any minor whim, though his attitude changed significantly after being sealed by him, even if his more childish behavior failed to diminish and makes him one of the Cardbots most prone to humiliating defeats. In addition to the ability to turn invisible, Shadow X's weapon card is a large shuriken the size of his body that mounts on his forearm.

- Dexter

A yellow and black Cardbot who transforms into a excavator with a wheeled chassis. Dexter started out as notoriously hostile towards humanity due to their tendency to disregard nature, often attacking construction sites and often lacking in mercy, though he mellowed out after Jun sealed him and he was shown that humans can, in fact, care for nature. Specializing in tunneling and underground warfare, Dexter's weapon card is a large gauntlet with a drill attached to the end.

- Fleta Z

A silver, red, black, and gold Cardbot who transforms into a cargo jet. A famous hunter on Machina, Fleta Z greatly valued his freedom and hated any form of control or confinement, being another Cardbot who saw Jun as another enslaver just by wearing the Metal Breath. Because of his fierce abilities and master hunting skills, he was a very hard opponent to beat and seal, though he quickly warmed up to Jun after he managed to seal him. Fleta Z keeps a sword on his person as a backup weapon, with his primary armament being his metal card weapon, a large bow and arrow. He is later revealed to have been a Wild Cardbot in season 3, having carried a dormant variant of the beast virus that wracked his body with pain upon Tyrant Zero's approach.

- Wild Guardy

A silver, purple, and gold knight-themed Cardbot who transforms into a sports car. Originally a huge fan of the Star Guardians who even admired Blue Cop back on Machina, Wild Guardy was found by Crest after crash-landing on Earth, and became fiercely loyal to him after the boy help restore him thanks to the resources at his disposal. Eventually wanting to become the king of the Metal Cardbots, Wild Guardy would target the Metal Breath as his primary tool for conquest and ruthlessly attacked any Cardbot he felt was being insubordinate, even challenging Blue Cop in an effort to prove himself. After being beaten, Wild Guardy was sealed by Jun and significantly mellowed out, and Crest formally passed custody of the Cardbot over to him, though he still remained by his side as much as possible. His metal card weapon is a large shield that can also become a broadsword, and the shield itself also contains a smaller sword that serves as his primary weapon.

- Black Hook

A blue, red, black, silver, and gold pirate-themed Cardbot who transforms into a flying galleon. A notorious criminal on Machina, Black Hook lead his own crew in attempts to secure the Metal Breath and rule their kind. He's utterly ruthless, boisterous, and egotistical, though he does have enough attachment to his crew that he takes betrayals very seriously. One of the most powerful Cardbots in the series, Black Hook is armed by default with a cudgel formed from the prow of his vehicle mode, which has several cannons on either side. His robot mode also features cannon assemblies on his back that elevate over his shoulders in firing position. His metal card weapon is yet another cannon that mounts to his shoulder like a bazooka and has a targeting sight for more accurate shots, with this cannon being his most powerful weapon.

- Buffalo Crush

A pink, green, black, and gold Cardbot who transforms into a monster truck. A member of Black Hook's crew, Buffalo Crush is the muscle of the group and is appropriately boisterous and brash. However, he is a lot more sentimental and is actually more capable than his crewmates at being polite and civil, though he's also a bit of a glutton, regularly downing several energy sources and being a lot less efficient than others at processing it. His primary weapons are a pair of throwing axes that also form his exhaust pipes in vehicle mode, and his metal card weapon is a buffalo-themed chestplate and mask combo that allows him to perform body slam attacks. He is later revealed to have been a Wild Cardbot in season 3, having carried a dormant variant of the beast virus that wracked his body with pain upon Tyrant Zero's approach.

- Buster Gallon

A green, teal, black, and yellow Cardbot who transforms into a bulldozer. A member of Black Hook's crew, Buster Gallon is the strategist and inventor who regularly eschews the more forceful or brutish tactics of Black Hook and Buffalo Crush in favor of using a newly created invention or outright deception, being the crew member with the most prominent silver tongue. He initially betrayed Black Hook in favor of his own goals, but ultimately repented after being sealed by Jun. His metal card weapon is a chestplate with a central chest cannon and two arms along the upper corners with gatling guns mounted on the end.

- Heavy Iron

A silver, red, black, navy blue, and gold Cardbot who transforms into a flatnose semi truck and trailer. Widely regarded by his own kind as the most powerful Metal Cardbot, Heavy Iron was the most notorious outlaw within range of Machina, being so domineering and indifferent to others that many outright fear him and do everything the can to avoid him. Originally crashing on Earth in an escape pod, Heavy Iron proved to be one of the most dangerous enemies Jun ever faced, and in the season 1 finale used a special artifact that risked turning Earth into another Machina and eradicating humankind. He began a process of reforming after Jun sealed him, but insecurities over his power during the Wild Cardbot crisis prompted him to seek more power by any means necessary before going rogue by deliberately infecting himself with the beast virus as Heavy Iron W.

In both his original and upgrade forms, Heavy Iron's exhaust pipes become collarbone-mounted machine guns in robot mode as secondary weapons. In his original body, his main weapons were blades that mount on his forearms, with his metal card weapon being a breastplate that allowed him to fire an energy blast from his chest. As Heavy Iron W, he instead wields a sword that can also double as a rifle, his shoulder pauldrons elongate and now mount a railgun in each, and his metal card weapon is now a dragon-head chestplate with an optional set of wings for his back and an extra blade that can either be wielded on its own or combined with his primary blade.

== Episodes ==
Season	Episodes	Originally released	
Season	Episodes	First released	Last released
1	26	March 29, 2023	September 13, 2023
2	26	September 10, 2024}	September 3, 2025
3	26	December 4, 2025	2026

=== Season 1 (2023) ===
No.	Title	Directed by	Written by	Original release date
1	"Mystery of the Police Car Robot!"; Transliteration: "Deungjang! Gyeongchalcha Lobos!?" (Korean: 등장! 경찰차 로봇!?)	Unknown	Unknown	March 29, 2023
2	"The Dancing Dump Truck"; Transliteration: "Chumchuneun Deompeu Teuleog" (Korean: 춤추는 덤프 트럭)	Unknown	Unknown	March 29, 2023
3	"Farewell, Blue Cop"; Transliteration: "Deungjang! Gyeongchalcha Lobos!?" (Korean: 등장! 경찰차 로봇!?)	Unknown	Unknown	April 5, 2023
4	"The Black Ambulance"; Transliteration: "Geom-eun Gugeubcha" (Korean: 검은 구급차)	Unknown	Unknown	April 12, 2023
5	"Fire Truck with a Phobia"; Transliteration: "Geobjaeng-i Sobangcha" (Korean: 겁쟁이 소방차)	Unknown	Unknown	April 19, 2023
6	"The Invisible Challenger"; Transliteration: "Boiji Anhneun Dojeonja" (Korean: 보이지 않는 도전자)	Unknown	Unknown	April 26, 2023
7	"Defeating the Haley Tornado"; Transliteration: "Helli Toneidoleul Mujjilleola!" (Korean: 헬리 토네이도를 무찔러라!)	Unknown	Unknown	May 3, 2023
8	"The Secret is Out!"; Transliteration: "Deulkyeossda! Metalkadeubos-ui Bimil" (Korean: 들켰다! 메탈카드봇의 비밀)	Unknown	Unknown	May 10, 2023
9	"0 Seconds to Destruction"; Transliteration: "Moutaun Bung-goe 0chojeon" (Korean: 모우타운 붕괴 0초전)	Unknown	Unknown	May 17, 2023
10	"Attack of the Final Boss!"; Transliteration: "Choejong Boseu Seubgyeog!" (Korean: 최종 보스 습격!)	Unknown	Unknown	May 24, 2023
11	"The Mysterious Transfer Student"; Transliteration: "Susukkekkiui Jeonhagsaeng" (Korean: 수수께끼의 전학생)	Unknown	Unknown	May 31, 2023
12	"Blue Cop's Special Training!"; Transliteration: "Beullukab, Teughun Ganghaeng!" (Korean: 블루캅, 특훈 강행!)	Unknown	Unknown	June 7, 2023
13	"Guardian of the Forest"; Transliteration: "Sup-ui Suhosin" (Korean: 숲의 수호신)	Unknown	Unknown	June 14, 2023
14	"Operation Underground Battle"; Transliteration: "Jihasotangjagjeon" (Korean: 지하소탕작전)	Unknown	Unknown	June 21, 2023
15	"A Metal Cardbot from the Sky!"; Transliteration: "Haneul Jeopyeon-eseo On Metalkadeubos" (Korean: 하늘 저편에서 온 메탈카드봇)	Unknown	Unknown	June 28, 2023
16	"The Vagabond in the Sky"; Transliteration: "Haneul-eul Tteodoneun Yulang-gaeg" (Korean: 하늘을 떠도는 유랑객)	Unknown	Unknown	July 5, 2023
17	"Showdown Between Blue Cop and Wild Guardy!"; Transliteration: "Beullukabgwa Waildeugadiui Daegyeol!" (Korean: 블루캅과 와일드가디의 대결!)	Unknown	Unknown	July 12, 2023
18	"The Great Showdown! Giant VS Giant!!"; Transliteration: "Daegyeogdol! Jaieonteu VS Jaieonteu!!" (Korean: 대격돌! 자이언트 VS 자이언트!!)	Unknown	Unknown	July 19, 2023
19	"The Hungry Metal Cardbot"; Transliteration: "Baegopeun Metalkadeubos" (Korean: 배고픈 메탈카드봇)	Unknown	Unknown	July 26, 2023
20	"Metal Breath Gets Stolen"; Transliteration: "Dodug Maj-eun Metalbeuleseu" (Korean: 도둑 맞은 메탈브레스)	Unknown	Unknown	August 2, 2023
21	Transliteration: "Annaui Metalbeuleseu" (Korean: 안나의 메탈브레스)	Unknown	Unknown	August 9, 2023
22	Transliteration: "Gusbai, Beopallokeuleoswi" (Korean: 굿바이, 버팔로크러쉬)	Unknown	Unknown	August 16, 2023
23	Transliteration: "Baesinja Beoseuteogaelleon" (Korean: 배신자 버스터갤런)	Unknown	Unknown	August 23, 2023
24	Transliteration: "Beullaeghukeuui Yeogseub" (Korean: 블랙후크의 역습)	Unknown	Unknown	August 30, 2023
25	"Happy Battle"; Transliteration: "Haepi Baeteul" (Korean: 해피 배틀)	Unknown	Unknown	September 6, 2023
26	Transliteration: "Choehuui Gyeoljeon" (Korean: 최후의 결전)	Unknown	Unknown	September 13, 2023

=== Season 2: Metal Cardbot S (2024–25) ===
No.	Title	Directed by	Written by	Original release date
1	"A Metal Cardbot Awakens from a Stone Tablet?!"; Transliteration: "Seogpan-eseo Kkaeeonan Metalkadeubos?!" (Korean: 석판에서 깨어난 메탈카드봇?!)	Unknown	Unknown	August 26, 2025
2	"Second Metal Card!"; Transliteration: "Du Bbeonjjae Metalkadeu!" (Korean: 두 번째 메탈카드!)	Unknown	Unknown	August 27, 2025
3	Transliteration: "Haneul Wiui Wihyeob" (Korean: 하늘 위의 위협)	Unknown	Unknown	September 3, 2025
4	Transliteration: "Sieloneun Simgiga Bulpyeonhae!" (Korean: 시에로는 심기가 불편해!)	Unknown	Unknown	September 10, 2024
5	Transliteration: "Teugjong! Gangcheol-ui Chwijaegija" (Korean: 특종! 강철의 취재기자)	Unknown	Unknown	September 17, 2024
6	Transliteration: "Meoseulhaideuui Seontaeg" (Korean: 머슬하이드의 선택)	Unknown	Unknown	September 24, 2024
7	Transliteration: "Dong-gul Daetalchul" (Korean: 동굴 대탈출)	Unknown	Unknown	October 1, 2024
8	Transliteration: "Gwaenchanh-a, Logkeuleoswi" (Korean: 괜찮아, 록크러쉬)	Unknown	Unknown	October 8, 2024
9	Transliteration: "Giganteulegseuwaui Jaehoe" (Korean: 기간트렉스와의 재회)	Unknown	Unknown	October 15, 2024
10	Transliteration: "Kkaeeonan Choegang-ui Him" (Korean: 깨어난 최강의 힘)	Unknown	Unknown	October 22, 2024
11	(Korean: 레드블리츠의 진심)	Unknown	Unknown	October 29, 2024
12	(Korean: 멈출 수 없어!)	Unknown	Unknown	November 5, 2024
13	(Korean: 낚아라! 바다의 무법자!)	Unknown	Unknown	November 12, 2024
14	(Korean: 도와줘, 딥바이트!)	Unknown	Unknown	November 19, 2024
15	(Korean: 순백의 날개, 스카이갤럽)	Unknown	Unknown	November 26, 2024
16	(Korean: 한밤의 유령 열차)	Unknown	Unknown	December 3, 2024
17	(Korean: 폭주 기관차 블래스트레인)	Unknown	Unknown	December 10, 2024
18	(Korean: 독점! 강철의 인터뷰)	Unknown	Unknown	December 17, 2024
19	(Korean: 정정당당! 벡터와 비트 형제!)	Unknown	Unknown	December 24, 2024
20	(Korean: 메탈브레스의 진정한 주인)	Unknown	Unknown	December 31, 2024
21	(Korean: 글로버의 최후)	Unknown	Unknown	January 7, 2025
22	(Korean: 무카라의 선물)	Unknown	Unknown	January 14, 2025
23	(Korean: 플레임노바의 부활)	Unknown	Unknown	January 21, 2025
24	(Korean: 스펠란자호를 찾아서)	Unknown	Unknown	January 28, 2025
25	(Korean: 붉은 방주의 전투)	Unknown	Unknown	February 4, 2025
26	(Korean: 강철의 귀환)	Unknown	Unknown	February 11, 2025

=== Season 3: Metal Cardbot W (2025–26) ===
No.	Title	Directed by	Written by	Original release date
1	Transliteration: "Byeonhwaui Sidae" (Korean: 등장! 경찰차 로봇!?)	Unknown	Unknown	December 4, 2025
2	Transliteration: "Waildeukadeubos-ui Pohyo" (Korean: 와일드카드봇의 포효)	Unknown	Unknown	December 11, 2025
3	Transliteration: "Baltobgwa Nalgae, Geuligo Ippal" (Korean: 발톱과 날개, 그리고 이빨)	Unknown	Unknown	December 18, 2025
4	Transliteration: "Pohoeg" (Korean: 포획)	Unknown	Unknown	December 25, 2025

== Toyline ==
Emerging as a competitor to Choirock's Hello Carbot and Young Toys' popular Tobot franchise, the Metal Cardbot toyline debuted in 2023, with 13 toys released within a yearly window.
