= Krush (disambiguation) =

Krush may refer to:

- Krush, a British electronic music act
- DJ Krush, a Japanese DJ/producer
  - Krush (album), DJ Krush's debut album
- Krush, a nickname for American professional bodybuilder Kristy Hawkins
- Irina Krush, American chess player and champion
- Krush, the powered-up version of Michael "Mike" Collins and two of the members of the Ghostforce from the show of the same name

== See also ==
- Crush (disambiguation)
- Krusz, a village in Poland
