= Power Battle Watch Car =

South Korean animated television series

- Genre: Action; Science fiction Comedy; Sports
- Opening theme: "Power Battle Watch Car Opening Song"
- Ending theme: "Power Battle Watch Car Ending Song"
- Country of origin: South Korea
- Original language: Korean
- No. of seasons: 2
- No. of episodes: 52

Production
- Running time: 11-12 minutes
- Production company: SAMG Animation

Original release
- Network: MBC TV
- Release: April 7 – November 15, 2016

Power Battle Watch Car is a South Korean animated television series produced by SAMG Animation, in association with Hyundai Motor Company, Innocen Worldwide (an in-house advertisement agency within Hyundai Motor Group), Union Investment Partners and CJ E&M.

The show also goes by the title Wrist Racers; this title is used in the UK and Mesin Duel in the Malaysia. The show also has similarities with the Pokémon TV series, in that humans train and battle alongside non-human allies.

== Plot ==
The series is set in "the not so near future". An automobile company named JHC Motors has created high-tech toy cars for kids, WatchCars, which are miniature sentient robotic cars that have become good companions to children and adults alike. Ever since, Watch Cars have become a global trend. The WatchCar Battle League is a competition where WatchCars battle alongside their trainers. Jino, one of the young Watch Car Masters, goes to the Watch Car Battle League with his Watch Car Bluewill. As the undefeated and undisputed champion of the league, Kai, Jino's opponent, remains a legend. Jino and his WatchCar Bluewill dodge various obstacles ahead to defeat him and become the new league champion. Meanwhile, the evil organization the Black Shadows attempts to eliminate all WatchCars using their "Monster WatchCars".

== Cast ==
Main characters

- Jino (voiced by Um Sang-hyun in Korean version)
  - BlueWill (voiced by Um Sang-hyun in Korean version)
- Roy (voiced by Jeon Tae-yeol in Korean version)
  - Avan (voiced by Jeon Tae-yeol in Korean version)
- Ari (voiced by Jeong Hye-won in Korean version)
  - Sona (voiced by Jeong Hye-won in Korean version)
- Maru (voiced by Jeong Yeong-ung in Korean version)
  - Poti (voiced by Jeong Yeong-ung in Korean version)
- Kai (voiced by Shin Yong-woo in Korean version)
  - Blood (voiced by Shin Yong-woo in Korean version)

Other characters

- May (voice by Bae Jinhong in Korean version)
- Mac (voice by Jung Hero in Korean version)
- Marie (voice by Hong So young in Korean version)
- Schmidt (voice by Nam Do Hyeong in Korean Version)
- Braking (voice by Lee Min Kyu on Korean version)
- Ain (voice by Nam Do Hyeong in Korean version)
- Shake (voice by Nam Do Hyeong in Korean version)
- Leo (voice by Nam Do Hyeong in Korean version)
- Samdong (voice by Shin Yong Woo in Korean version)
- Hans (voice by Shin Yong Woo in Korean version)
- Sophie (voice by Bae Jinhong in Korean version)
- Tommy (voice by Hong So Young in Korean version)

The Guardians

- Heidi (voice by Hong So Young in Korean version)
- Lia (voice by Hong So Young in Korean version)
- Aaron (voice by Nam Do Hyeong in Korean version)

Black Shadow

- Chongsu (voice by Jeon Tae Yeol in Korean version)
- Tori (voice by Bae Jinhong in Korean version)
- Kuri (voice by Shin Yong Woo in Korean version)

== Characters ==
=== Jino ===
Jino is strong and an invincible fighter in his team. At times, he can be arrogant. He can sometimes think things will come easy to him, but he learns the value of hard work during his time with his friends. He is the leader when it comes to handling the Black Shadows. Bluewill is his Watch Car, and they have a strong bond together. He was defeated by Kai in the first episode, but after that, he gained a winning streak. Jino is responsible for handling the Mind Keys as Bluewill is the next-generation Watch Car. In the finale, Jino befriends Kai as one of few friends. His father is Mac and his mother is May. Mac is a bit biased by giving his own child specifically a major upgrade in his watch car in front of everyone. He wasn't supposed to win against Roy and Kai according to majority of the fandom.

=== Bluewill ===
Bluewill is the next-generation watch car and is the only watch car in the series that possess the Mind Keys. He has a romantic interest in Sona and they like each other very much. Bluewill was defeated by Kai but has never been defeated by anyone else after that. After the match with Kai, he suffered from amnesia and Jino helped Bluewill recover. Throughout the series, Bluewill and Jino battled many opponents, both in the Battle League, and against the Black Shadows, and these battles have helped them strengthen their bond with each other.

=== Roy ===
Observant, highly intelligent, Roy is the master of flame and his Watch Car Avan has fire-related abilities. He runs and bikes often when he is not reading books or spending time with his friends. He is childhood friends with Ari, and has a romantic interest in her, but only found out in the episode "Lost Cupid's Arrow". He even got jealous when Ari briefly dated Hans, only for her discover later that he (Hans) was simply using her to sabotage Jino and Bluewill. Roy then comforts her and tells her that she was not to blame. When Ari finds out about his feelings for her, she rejects him at first, hurting his feelings, but later said she would think about accepting him. He is one of the Twelve Masters and has had matches against Kai before. He is sensitive to physical stimuli, and also does not like to have his photo taken, due to being reserved and appearing to dislike his image. He’s often at odds with Jino, most of which altercations are short-lived thanks to interventions from Ari and Maru.

=== Avan ===
Avan is Roy's Watch Car. His personality is same just like Roy. But being serious and harsh doesn't matter, as he is also a caring car, just like others. Avan also sacrificed his own life for others. In the "Ultra Watch Car in Crisis" episode, he saves Sona by taking in the fire attack. Hence, he died by doing this. However, at the Watch Car gala, it is revealed that Ari, through Mac, brought him back to life.

=== Maru ===
Maru is Jino's friend and does not play in the Battle League just like Ari. His watch car is named Poti. His personality is kind, hot tempered, cocky, smart, and loyal. He is Jino and Ari's cousin. Although he is not a Master in the current episodes, he has played against Kai in the Watch Car Battle League (in a qualifier). Thus, he was a former Battle League player. In the episode " Lost Cupid's Arrow", he and Jino were teasing Roy and Ari for going alone and made them think they were going on a date.

=== Poti ===
Poti is Maru's watch car and has the same personality. His weapons are Storm Gun, Crazy Missiles, Rocket Punch and the amazing Giant Fist as his Power Coin. He also has a defense block for emergencies. Although he has been shown in most of the episodes, we do not really know what he can really do.

=== Ari ===
Ari is a charming, caring and tomboyish girl who always cares for her team. Ari is the only one that never plays in the Watch Car Battle League, as the power of her Love Love Beam is unsuitable for it. She always charms anyone when they start fighting and turning their backs on each other. She has never fit in with any other girls, as she was very different. She and Roy are childhood friends.

Ari also had a crush on Hans, one of the Watch Car Masters, but sadly broke up when she found out his true colors. Hans is handsome and has skills, but was taking advantage of Ari, listening to her conversations, and even hurt Bluewill before their match. Later, she learns that Roy has a crush on her after receiving an accidental text message from him. At first she refuses, not wanting to ruin their friendship, but after Roy won the racing match, she then tells him she will make her decision after keeping an eye on him. She turns out to have a terrible singing voice as shown in dark rises as all the main characters are shown to be traumatized by her singing. She also tends to make them uncomfortable by using posing and cute faces to charm them into stopping their fights. She is also shown to be a glutton for food. She also tends to be short-tempered whenever someone, (namely: Jino, Sophie, Maria, and Hans) mocks or tricks her, she will get into physical fights with them herself, or if someone is harassed by bullies.

=== Sona ===
Sona is Ari's Watch Car who has the ability to make anyone fall in love with her. She is a beautiful and innocent Watch Car. She has many beautiful, incredible and fierce powers such as Love Love Beam, Love Love Missiles and the most incredible Wonder Love Swan. Bluewill and Sona also have a crush on each other. She is the main female Watch Car. Everyone cares for her because of her innocent attitude.

=== Kai ===
Kai is everyone in the battle league's rival as he held the top spot. Kai is caring, reserved, smart, precise, ruthless, attractive, intelligent and a good player. Due to neglect early on in his life, he struggles with the image of perfection. He is normally seen as a perfect example. Other girls like Sophie and Luna have big crushes on Kai, but he tends to get very uncomfortable with them. Everything he does is to impress his busy father. His father shunned him away when his mother died. He buried himself in work and never has time for his son. He believes he should be the best because he is his son. Kai shares a close bond with his watch car and as such is one of the best in the battle league. Kai and Roy share a rival relationship that could blossom into friendship as it has with Jino. He has few friends and even fewer family. He is closer with his butler than his own father. During one of his lowest points the Shadows successfully take control over Kai’s mind and makes him battle with Jino. He battles Jino and loses but vows to return. The Shadow gives him a stronger key and he becomes more dark and powerful. He takes on every watch car and destroys almost all of them. Thankfully, Jino, Maru, Ari and Roy bring him to return to normal. In the finale he aids them after Avan is destroyed. He begins to open up after the finale. His watch car is Blood.

=== May ===
May is the loving wife of Mac, and Jino and Ari's mother, and Maria and Maru's aunt. She makes the food and handles the emotional side of taking care of her kids and niece and nephew. She is sweet but firm, loving, a romantic, and good person.

=== Mac ===
Mac is the father of Jino and Ari, uncle of Maria and Maru, husband of May and genius mechanic of watch cars. He is characterized as intelligent and romantic, a good father/husband/uncle.

=== Maria ===
Maria is Maru's annoying and rude little sister. She clashes with Ari.

=== Schmidt ===
Schmidt is the smarter, sarcastic, stronger, and nicer of the two closest followers and friends of Kai. He is shown to be quite loyal, cunning and sneaky, as during the race in, Race down to Ari's heart, he attacks when no one is looking. His watch car is Tigard. His watch car is a tank. His is 14 years old. He is shown to be quite loyal to Kai as he also stayed loyal to Kai when he turned evil. He is one of the twelve masters of the watch car battle league.

=== Braking ===
Braking is the hotheaded, cocky, and obnoxious follower and friend of Kai. He is 12 years old. He is shown to be incredibly loyal to Kai even staying by his side when he turned evil. He didn't even take his wrath out on him but on Jino instead, despite Kai being the one saying it. But his loyalty has seemed to stray at times such as when he was seen cheering for Sophie. He is somewhat strong but has fallen against Roy and Jino. Braking's watch car is X-ca. His watch car is built like a construction car. He is one of the twelve masters of the watch car battle league.

=== Ain ===
Ain is the genius mechanic who creates maniacal but ingenious inventions for every match he participates in. Hence it is hard to prepare against him. He is 12 years old. He is intelligent, crazy, and funny. He is shown to have a high IQ as he accidentally created a weapon for the black shadows. His watch car is Gaus. He is one of the twelve masters of the watch car battle league.

=== Leo ===
Leo is one of the twelve masters of the watch car battle league. He is the master of ice. He is cold, calculated, intelligent, and impulsive. Leo used to go to school with Roy, with whom they shared classes and were good friends. Leo's watch car was constantly harassed and the bullies who did it blamed it on Roy by placing his ball cap there. Leo then blamed him and attacked him causing Avan to jump in and protect him hurting his watch car in the process. Leo leaves after transferring to another school but held a grudge against him. He comes back after the Shadow used a dark key to transform him and his watch car. Sonny became Frone and Leo's appearance was altered. He now has white and blue on his outfit, ice blue eyes and white hair to match. He enters a match between him and Roy and Roy wins despite his attempts to kill Avan. In the end Roy is friends with him again. His watch car is Frone/Sonny.

=== SamDong ===
SamDong is one of the twelve masters in the watch car battle league. He is 13 years old. He seems to stay at his opponents houses before the match as a tactical move considering he still lives with his mother. He is dirty, rude, and cruel towards his watch car. He is shown to abuse his watch car using an electric shock on him to get him to listen or even to punish him. He even does this in front of Jino, who scolds him for doing so. He later learns how this negatively affects Humby as it causes him to attack him mercilessly. He stops after Bluewill defeats him. He treats him better and even washes and cuts his hair short offscreen. His watch car is Humby whose design resembles a military vehicle.

=== Hans ===
Hans is a handsome, cunning, manipulative battle league master. He is 14 years old. He is a playboy. He is very cunning and manipulative, as he manipulated Ari through a fake relationship that he staged when he heard she knew Jino. From there, he claimed he wanted to make her his, he proposed during a date, eavesdropped using a device in the ring, and steals the chip Mac made during a visit. After Ari finds out he used her, she is upset. Roy comforts her and she helps Jino win the match. Later she punches him for making her angry. Close to the finale he tries to flirt with a female student who does not fall for it. He is seen on the news a few minutes later. At the finale, he attempts to flirt with Sophie who turns him down. His watch car is Victor.

=== Sophie ===
Sophie is an actress and also participates in the watch car battle league. She is 13 years old. She is childish, arrogant, obnoxious, repulsive, selfish, manipulative and clingy to Roy. She tries to flirt with Roy numerous times but never gives up on him. Sophie is an actress who rarely gets a break between shootings, script reading, campaign events, photoshoots, and the battle league. She is shown to run away a lot, and acts out in public. She gets what she wants when she wants due to being spoiled by her manager. She is shown to have a temper and say bad things to people when upset. After making a bet with Ari for Roy during a fight, she attempts to make him hers. Even though she loses she still attempts to make him her boyfriend. Her watch car is Lucia.

== Series overview ==
Season	Episodes	Originally released	
Season	Episodes	First released	Last released
1	26	April 7, 2016	July 7, 2016
2	26	August 23, 2016	November 15, 2016

== Episodes ==
=== Season 1 (2016) ===
No.	Title	Directed by	Written by	Original release date
1	"My Friend, Watch Car Part 1"	Lee Young-un	Choi In-hee and Lee-So hyun	April 7, 2016
2	"My Friend, Watch Car Part 2"	Unknown	Unknown	April 7, 2016
3	"The Dark Rises Part 1"	Unknown	Unknown	April 14, 2016
4	"The Dark Rises Part 2"	Unknown	Unknown	April 14, 2016
5	"The Dark Rises Part 3"	Unknown	Unknown	April 21, 2016
6	"Genius Mechanic, Ain Part 1"	Unknown	Unknown	April 21, 2016
7	"Genius Mechanic, Ain Part 2"	Unknown	Unknown	April 28, 2016
8	"Genius Mechanic, Ain Part 3"	Unknown	Unknown	April 28, 2016
9	"Invincible Shield, Million Part 1"	Unknown	Unknown	May 12, 2016
10	"Invincible Shield, Million Part 2"	Unknown	Unknown	May 12, 2016
11	"Top Star, Sophie Part 1"	Unknown	Unknown	May 19, 2016
12	"Top Star, Sophie Part 2"	Unknown	Unknown	May 19, 2016
13	"Top Star, Sophie Part 3"	Unknown	Unknown	May 26, 2016
14	"The First Guardian Part 1"	Unknown	Unknown	May 26, 2016
15	"The First Guardian Part 2"	Unknown	Unknown	June 2, 2016
16	"The First Guardian Part 3"	Unknown	Unknown	June 2, 2016
17	"A Foul Mind"	Unknown	Unknown	June 9, 2016
18	"Fair Play"	Unknown	Unknown	June 9, 2016
19	"Tomboy Marie"	Unknown	Unknown	June 16, 2016
20	"False Charge"	Unknown	Unknown	June 16, 2016
21	"Tommy's Old Watch-Car"	Unknown	Unknown	June 23, 2016
22	"Beloved Gift"	Unknown	Unknown	June 23, 2016
23	"Two-Faced Boy"	Unknown	Unknown	June 30, 2016
24	"Unexpected Rampage"	Unknown	Unknown	June 30, 2016
25	"Leo the Ice Warrior"	Unknown	Unknown	July 7, 2016
26	"Battle of Ice and Flame"	Unknown	Unknown	July 7, 2016

=== Season 2 (2016) ===
No. overall	No. in season	Title	Directed by	Written by	Original release date
27	1	"Missing Blue-Will"	Unknown	Unknown	August 23, 2016
28	2	"The Second Guardian"	Unknown	Unknown	August 23, 2016
29	3	"The Black Emperor"	Unknown	Unknown	August 30, 2016
30	4	"Master of Eternal Flame"	Unknown	Unknown	August 30, 2016
31	5	"The Rage of Schmidt"	Unknown	Unknown	September 6, 2016
32	6	"Target, Lock-On!"	Unknown	Unknown	September 6, 2016
33	7	"Lost Cupid's Arrow"	Unknown	Unknown	September 13, 2016
34	8	"Attack at the Themepack"	Unknown	Unknown	September 13, 2016
35	9	"Ari's Prince"	Unknown	Unknown	September 20, 2016
36	10	"What Goes Around, Comes Around"	Unknown	Unknown	September 20, 2016
37	11	"Friendship Versus Love"	Unknown	Unknown	September 27, 2016
38	12	"Race Down to Ari's Heart"	Unknown	Unknown	September 27, 2016
39	13	"The Caesar of the Dark League"	Unknown	Unknown	October 4, 2016
40	14	"The Last Guardian"	Unknown	Unknown	October 4, 2016
41	15	"The Shadow on Kai"	Unknown	Unknown	October 11, 2016
42	16	"Clash Again! Jino vs. Kai"	Unknown	Unknown	October 11, 2016
43	17	"The Primary Watch-Car, S009"	Unknown	Unknown	October 18, 2016
44	18	"Runaway Pony"	Unknown	Unknown	October 18, 2016
45	19	"Friends or No Friends"	Unknown	Unknown	October 25, 2016
46	20	"Unforgettable Match"	Unknown	Unknown	October 25, 2016
47	21	"Raid from the Dark"	Unknown	Unknown	November 1, 2016
48	22	"The Ultra Watch-Car Genesis"	Unknown	Unknown	November 1, 2016
49	23	"Unveil the Shadow"	Unknown	Unknown	November 8, 2016
50	24	"Ultra Watch-Car in Crisis"	Unknown	Unknown	November 8, 2016
51	25	"Final Showdown"	Unknown	Unknown	November 15, 2016
52	26	"New Rise of the Watch-Car Champion"	Unknown	Unknown	November 15, 2016

== See also ==
- Yo-kai Watch, anime, characters use Yo-kai Watch, a wristwatch that allows the wearer to communicate with Yo-kai, to detect Yo-kai and to summon them with the Yo-kai Medals
- Metalions, South Korean 3D animated series, characters use wrist summoning devices called Infinity Watches, that summon Metalions and with Archean Stones can temporarily upgrade and combine them
