= Don't Leave Me Alone, Daisy =

Japanese manga series

みすて♥ないでデイジー (Misutenaide Deijī)
- Genre: Romantic comedy, science fiction
- Manga
- Written by: Noriko Nagano
- Published by: Tokuma Shoten; ASCII
- Magazine: Monthly Shōnen Captain
- Original run: October 1986 – September 1989
- Volumes: 3 (Tokuma) + 2 (ASCII)
- Anime television series
- Directed by: Yuji Mutoh
- Produced by: Masahiro Toyozumi
- Written by: Ryota Yamaguchi; Kazuhisa Sakaguchi; Satoru Nishizono
- Music by: Akihisa Matsura; Koki Ito; Yutaka Odawara
- Studio: Studio Deen
- Licensed by: NA: Bandai Entertainment
- Original network: TV Tokyo
- Original run: July 2, 1997 – September 17, 1997
- Episodes: 12

Don't Leave Me Alone, Daisy (Japanese: みすて♥ないでデイジー, Hepburn: Misutenaide Deijī) is a Japanese manga series written and illustrated by Noriko Nagano and serialized in the Tokuma Shoten magazine Monthly Shōnen Captain. The manga was adapted into an anime series from Studio Deen in 1997. It was licensed for release in North America by Bandai and released in 2000 as a two-disc set with only subtitles. The series is currently unlicensed and out-of-print.

== Plot ==
It is about a boy named Techno who lived in a bomb shelter most of his life. He and his grandfather are amazingly smart. But one day Techno sees a girl named Hitomi on his yard. He instantly falls in love. He names her Daisy, even though she keeps telling him that's not her name. After 3 months of practice on a robot he decides to get a relationship started with her. But all he can do is stare. Then he decides to get full ownership of her, but she still doesn't really belong to Techno. Along their way on this crazy relationship, Techno's genius almost kills Hitomi multiple times. That includes making her 50 feet tall, making a replacement teacher that shoots laser beams, creating a giant slug, kidnapping her, and much more. More crazy things include a teacher that wears weird costumes, a harmless boy rebel that is wanted dead by Techno, his mom, and brother, Techno's over protective grandfather, Hitomi's friends, an android that wants Techno dead and to protect Hitomi, the 2 missiles that Techno befriended, and the rest of the class.

== Reception and legacy ==
Animerica gave the series 1 star out of 5, summarizing its view as, "Stalking is funny?" T.H.E.M. Anime Reviews went further in describing its 1 star rating: "Don't Leave Me Alone Daisy is one of the creepiest and most unsettling series we've ever seen." Mark Johnson of EX commented on the behavior of the male lead, "the disturbing callousness of Techno and his stalking tendencies rubbed me the wrong way." Anime News Network said the series was "breathtakingly average." Due to the negative criticism, the series' ending song, "One More Chance" was reused in the 1997 Capcom video game Rockman X4, known outside of Japan as Mega Man X4.

A similar-looking missile to the missile Mimi-chan made an appearance in Marisa Kirisame's ending of Phantasmagoria of Dim. Dream, when Marisa wanted a weapon from the Outside World from Yumemi Okazaki. This appearance is more known than the anime and manga itself.
