= Crushed =

Crushed may refer to:

== Music ==
- "Crushed" (Imagine Dragons song), 2023
- "Crushed" (Roland Lee Gift song), 2009
- "Crushed", a song by Cocteau Twins from the 1991 compilation album The Box Set
- "Crushed", a song by Dala from the 2009 album Everyone Is Someone
- "Crushed", a song by Eighteen Visions from the 2004 album Obsession
- "Crushed", a song by Limp Bizkit from the 1999 soundtrack album End of Days
- "Crushed", a song by Parkway Drive from the 2015 album Ire
- "Crushed", a song by Rosette Sharma

== Television ==
- Crushed (TV series), an Indian television series
- "Crushed" (Ms. Marvel), a 2022 episode of the American television series Ms. Marvel
- "Crushed" (The Suite Life of Zack & Cody episode), an episode of the television show The Suite Life of Zack & Cody
- "Crushed", an episode of the Indian adaptation The Suite Life of Karan & Kabir

== See also ==
- Crush (disambiguation)
- Crusher (disambiguation)
