= Catch! Teenieping =

2020 South Korean animated TV series

- Twinkle Catch! Teenieping poster (Note: The characters' names are as follows, in clockwise order; Romi (The human character with pink hair), Teeheeping, Heartsping, Joahping, and Trustping.)
- Also known as: Twinkle Catch! Teenieping (season 2); Secret Catch! Teenieping (season 3); Dessert Catch! Teenieping (season 4); Star Catch! Teenieping (season 5); Princess Catch! Teenieping (season 6); Jewel Star Catch! Teenieping (season 7)
- Hangul: 캐치! 티니핑
- RR: Kaechi! Tiniping
- MR: K'aech'i! T'inip'ing
- Genre: Magical girl Comedy; Fantasy; Action; Adventure
- Written by: Ryōta Yamaguchi
- Country of origin: South Korea
- Original language: Korean
- No. of seasons: 7
- No. of episodes: 182

Production
- Running time: 11 minutes
- Production company: SAMG Entertainment

Original release
- Network: KBS2 (new TBC)(season 1); JEI TV (season 2-present)
- Release: March 19, 2020 – present

Catch! Teenieping (Note: Also known as Catch! ping or CATCH PING Fairies of Emotion; The alternative English title was used in KOCCA. (The former title was in the posters for the show, and the latter is written on the page itself.) However, on the official English YouTube channel, the title Catch! Teenieping is being used as the English name for the show.) (Korean: 캐치! 티니핑) is a South Korean animated children's television series produced by SAMG Entertainment. The series is written by Ryōta Yamaguchi, who wrote the scripts for Sailor Moon Sailor Stars, Cutie Honey Flash, Digimon Data Squad, DokiDoki! PreCure and The Vision of Escaflowne, and also unlicensed Korean adaptation of the French animated series Miraculous Ladybug. The first season of the series aired on KBS2 from 19 March 2020, to 13 June 2021. The second season of the series aired from 22 September 2021, to 16 March 2022, under the title Twinkle Catch! Teenieping (반짝반짝 캐치! 티니핑) on JEI TV. The third, fourth, fifth, sixth and seventh seasons of the series arrived on JEI TV.

== Plot ==
The series revolves around Romi, a pretty normal girl at first glance, who is actually the princess of the Emotion Kingdom, a magical kingdom. She came to Earth to catch all the Teeniepings: cute but very mischievous creatures that all have a unique power attached to an emotion or a concept they represent. They like to wreak havoc across all of Harmony Town and try everything to avoid being caught. To catch them, Romi has to transform into a magical princess with the help of some Teeniepings. The people of Harmony do not know what happened, so the princess must keep her identity as secret as possible. Only the people closest to her can know her identity as a princess.

=== Season 1 (2020–21) ===
Comprising 52 episodes and airing in 2020 and 2021, it establishes the show's identity. It revolves around the Emotion Teeniepings, accidentally released on Earth by Romi, who goes on a mission to catch them and bring them back, accompanied by the Royal Teeniepings. The second half of the season also revolves around the pranking villain Giggleping and the mysteriously disappeared Happying.

=== Season 2: Twinkle (2021–22) ===
Composed of 26 episodes and aired in 2021 and 2022, it revolves around the Jewel Teeniepings, special Teeniepings residing in the Jewel Forest, who are released on Earth by a mysterious new villain, Maskping. To take care of the new, very immature Teeniepings accompanying Romi, Heartsping gets in charge of the Teenieping School, a new school opened to all the Jewel Teeniepings.

=== Season 3: Secret (2022–23) ===
Composed of 26 episodes and aired in 2022 and 2023, it revolves around the Key Teeniepings, key-themed Teeniepings that used to reside in the mysterious Mystic Town before it was invaded by Jennie, who released all the fairies on Earth for Romi to catch. And while the messy and cute Royal Key Teeniepings all help Romi in her mission, they also encounter a mysterious Teenieping, locked in a box...

=== Season 4: Dessert (2023–24) ===
Composed of 26 episodes and aired in 2023 and 2024, it revolves around the Dessert Teeniepings, dessert-themed inhabitants of the colorful Dessert Town. However, a strange phenomenon occurs when all the Dessert Teeniepings are released on Earth: after one Teenieping, Puffping steals the Magic Sugar Ball. And now, Romi will have to accomplish her mission as fast as possible; otherwise, the Cake Palace will inevitably collapse!

=== Season 5: Star (2024–25) ===
Composed of 26 episodes and aired in 2024 and 2025, it revolves around the Star Teeniepings, constellation-themed Teeniepings inhabiting the Space Star Village/Celestial. The question is: Will Heartsping, Romi, and their new royal friends find the Star Teeniepings scattered on Earth and restore their home?

=== Season 6: Princess (2025–26) ===
Composed of 26 episodes and aired 2025 and 2026, it revolves around the Princess Teeniepings, princess/royal-themed Teeniepings inhabiting the Princess Teenieping House. To make matters even more mysterious, a Legend Teenieping appears in a mirror before Romi. A mysterious teenieping sends all the princess teeniepings to earth. Together with the new Royal Teeniepings, a grand mission begins to catch the Princess Teeniepings!

=== Season 7: Jewel Star (2026–27) ===
Composed of 20 episodes and aired 2026 and 2027

== Characters ==
=== Main ===
- Romi (로미) (Korean: Lee Ji-hyun and Eun-hye Singing in the movie, English: Catalina Natasha (season 1), Bommie Catherine Han (Season 2)) is the princess of the Emotion Kingdom, who became a normal girl of Harmony Town. When a freed Teenieping is around, she secretly transforms into a magical princess to catch them.
- Heartsping (Korean: Jo Kyung-yi, English: Regina Tiscareño (season 1), Nancy Kim (season 2)) – The Royal Teenieping of love, whom is Romi's companion. She appears throughout every season as a main character, deeply cares about her friends, and is always filled with love. She is Romi's personal Teenieping.

=== Supporting characters ===
- Maya (마야) (Korean: Jang Ye-na, English: Alexis Song (season 2)): She is one of Romi's best friends, along with Marylou, as she understands and supports her. Nice and a little shy, Maya is known for her sweet and kind personality.
- Marylou (메리루) (Korean: Kim Chae-ha, English: Brenda Song (season 1), Dami Lee (season 2)): She is one of Romi's best friends, along with Maya, as she understands and supports her. She is a very athletic girl with a tomboy personality. She is a mixed race from the Democratic Republic of Congo.
- Sarah (사라) (Korean: Eunah Kim, English: Anna Paik (season 2)) is Romi's older cousin and can be a little bossy, strong-minded, and courageous. Is the one who opened the Heartrose Bakery, a mother-like figure to Romi, and takes care of her.
- Ian (이안) (Korean: Kim Hyeon-uk (seasons 1–2), Choi Seung Hoon (seasons 3–present), English: Mike Yantzi (season 2)) is a young man who desires to be a pastry chef, following in his father's footsteps.
- Kyle (카일) (Korean: Um Sang-hyun and Eunah Kim (child), English: Pato Ortiz (season 1), Matt Anipen (season 2)) is the son of a famous and wealthy conglomerate who wishes to become a pastry chef.
- Jun (준) (Korean: Kim Myung-jun, English: Enrique Maddox (season 1), Josh Schwartzentruber (season 2)) is a handsome young man who aims to own his own bakery one day.
- Jennie (제니) (Korean: Kang Eun-ae, English: Anna Paik (season 1)): She is a princess of the Emotions Kingdom. Introduced in Season 2 as Romi's cousin and heart-sister, a kind and innocent girl, she actually turns out to be the one who released all the Teeniepings since the beginning. After revealing her true colors, she becomes the main antagonist of Season 3, but then comes back to her senses and is given a second chance by everyone, allowing her to become nice again. Jennie had quite a troubled childhood, indeed: the disappearance of her parents made her progressively jealous of Romi, who had all the privileges, while she was terribly missing her own parents. Therefore, she, along with her personal Teenieping Onlyping, made many plans to make her life miserable. Fortunately, Romi and everyone allowed her to make a fresh start and get past her terrible past.
- Onlyping (Korean: Lee Myung-Hee, English: Jillian Robbins (season 2)) – she is the Jewel Teenieping of dedication, wielding the Tahitian black pearl who appears from Twinkle Catch! Teenieping onwards. Jennie's personal Teenieping; she debuts in "Another Princess," and as Maskping in "Twinkle Twinkle, Jewel Teeniepings."
- Dr. Monziu (몬쥬박사) (Korean: Hong Bum-ki, English: Josh Schwartzentruber (season 2)): He is the scientist and inventor from the Emotions Kingdom. He creates the various tools Romi uses during her Teenieping-catching missions, as he knows everything about the Kingdom's magic.
- Noah – Noah, full name Noah Calem Celeste XIII, is a prince of the North Pole Planet. Introduced in Star Catch! Teenieping, as a transfer student who had joined Mr. Dayne's class in "Share the Light, Giverping", he has kept a close eye on Romi until he eventually reveals his true identity to her at the end of "Romi Became a Teenieping". He has been trying to find his personal Teenieping, Princeping, after receiving his golden crown that fell from the sky. By the time he reunites with him, he accompanies Romi and the Royal Star Teeniepings to go to his home planet to find and rescue Auroraping.

=== Royal Emotion Teeniepings ===
- Heartsping – The Royal Teenieping of love, whom is Romi's companion. She appears throughout every season as a main character, deeply cares about her friends, and is always filled with love. She is Romi's personal Teenieping.
- Dadaping – The Royal Teenieping of rightness; he is studious, smart, and organized. Cloud-themed, he often helps the team with his large knowledge and inventive ideas.
- Gogoping – The Royal Teenieping of courage; he is sporty, brave, and energetic. Star-themed, he likes challenges and acts impulsively, which sometimes makes him lose touch with reality.
- Chachaping – The Royal Teenieping of hope; she has a calm personality. Nature-themed, she loves nature and flowers, and never loses hope during difficult times.
- Lalaping – The Royal Teenieping of joy; she is energetic and cheerful. Music-themed, she likes to sing very loudly to express her feelings and lift the team's mood.
- Happying – The Royal Teenieping of happiness and sunshine-themed; she maintains a happy, upbeat personality and loves to play with bubbles. It is later revealed that she was the Teenieping who transformed into Giggleping. She made a reappearance in "Princess Catch! Teenieping".

=== Royal Jewel Teeniepings ===
- Joahping – The Teenieping of kindness, who is warm and sensitive. Wielding the Emerald, she is always ready to help her friends and always stays nice to everyone.
- Teeheeping – The Teenieping of laughter, possessing a tomboy personality. Wielding the Ruby, she likes to play and get into crazy activities to have good times with her friends.
- Trustping- The Teenieping of trust, he is cute and naïve. Wielding the Sapphire, he is faithful and innocent and easily believes anyone, and loves to eat chocolate balls.

=== Royal Key Teeniepings ===
- Okeydokeyping -The Teenieping of peace, with a gentle, caring personality. Winter-themed, she is thoughtful and sociable, as she likes things to stay peaceful.
- Nanaping – The Teenieping of passion, full of devotion and confidence. Sunshine-themed, she has strong passions but short patience, which sometimes makes her sloppy.
- Trueping – The Teenieping of honesty, with a cute, whiny type of personality. Cloud and Star-themed, he likes to be honest with himself and with others, which can sometimes create uncomfortable situations.

==== Legend Key Teeniepings ====
- Luckyping – The Teenieping of luck, she is locked in a box for most of the season, and stays under Romi's protection. She likes to take part in the group's activities, but is often brought down by her excessive bad luck. Once freed, she reveals her true nature.

=== Royal Dessert Teeniepings ===
- Shashaping – The ice cream-themed Teenieping of optimism, she has an optimistic, understanding, and positive state of mind at all times. She deeply considers her friends and always listens to what others have to say.
- Fluffyping – The cotton candy-themed Teenieping of innocence, she is very kind to everyone, as she believes nothing is fundamentally bad. However, this way of thinking will sometimes cause her to have accidents. She reappears in season 6.
- Jellyping – The jelly-themed Teenieping of fun. She has a lively, quirky personality and is never tired. She does not think much before acting and quickly forgets her problems, as she always seeks the most fun activities.

==== Legend Dessert Teeniepings ====
- Sweetping – The sweet/smoothie/cake themed Teenieping of sweetness. Her powers endure for eternity, as she wields the ancient force of sweetness.
- Tangyping – The sour/smoothie/cake themed Teenieping of refreshment. Her powers endure for eternity, as she wields the powerful force of sourness.

=== Royal Star Teeniepings ===
- Shimmerping – The gentle and emotional Teenieping of healing, she is gentle and filled with kindness; her genuine compassion is evident, as is her deep sensitivity to small things.
- Sparkleping – The confident and lively Teenieping of wishes. She is confident and filled with fearlessness. She is quite tomboyish and often seeks the spotlight, but she also encourages others to celebrate their individuality.
- Twinkleping – The bright and quirky Teenieping of brightness. She is immaculate, bright, and unassuming, but her behavior can be unpredictably erratic, appearing engaged, but she often struggles to understand what is being said.
- Princeping – The regal, but sorrowful Teenieping of excellence. He is loyal and dedicated, but can be regretful if someone he cares about risks their life to save his. After losing Auroraping when a Black Hole appears, Princeping became Petitping when he lost his crown.

=== Legend Star Teeniepings ===
- Auroraping – Auroraping is the Legend Teenieping of promise. She is gentle and kind, who loves the stars and plays with Princeping. She is protective and loyal, but also self-sacrificing, willing to risk her life to save those she cares about.

=== Normal Star Teeniepings ===
- Hopping – The Teenieping of mettle who represents the constellation Lepus. She is very energetic and determined, and tries her best to keep it up even in hard situations. She reappears in "Princess Catch! Teenieping".
- Hulaping – The Teenieping of activity that represents the planet Saturn and the constellation Circinus. She cannot stand to see anyone feeling worn out — she believes everyone should join her for a fun hula hoop session!
- Giverping – The Teenieping of charity who represents the planet Venus and the constellation Virgo, she brings comfort by illuminating the lives of those who feel sad or depressed, wrapping them in a gentle embrace of understanding and compassion.
- Dingdongping – The Teenieping of dispensation who represents the constellation Felis, she is always on the move. With a swift and playful spirit, she loves delivering items quickly and efficiently. Whether it is a surprise gift or a much-needed item, she ensures it arrives!
- Petitping – The Corona Australis-Themed Teenieping of ideal, he embodies a serene calmness, navigating life's storms with effortless ease. In times of trouble, he encourages others to release their sorrow, allowing it to drift away like a delicate paper boat on a swift stream. He is later revealed to be Princeping.
- Dazzleping – The Indus-Themed Teenieping of rapidness. She is an energetic and selfless individual who loves to zoom along on her roller skates, always eager to lend a hand to those in need. However, her unwavering dedication often blinds her to her own limits, pushing herself to take risks that could endanger her well-being.
- Stickerping – The Ara-Themed Teenieping of exhibition, her attitude is top-notch! She loves collecting and showcasing the world around her. She likes showing her stickers off, but never likes to be too proud.
- Mightyping – The Ursa Major-Themed Teenieping of strength. She carries the strength and heart of a bear, balancing her powerful nature with a gentle curiosity. While she dislikes fear, she faces it head-on with tolerance and bravery, determined to overcome it for herself and others.
- Ellaping – The Gemini-Themed Teenieping of alliance. She harbors a profound love for her younger sister, Bellaping, and has a knack for transforming small hopes into big dreams.
- Bellaping – The Gemini-Themed Teenieping of alliance. She has a profound love for her older sister, Ellaping, and transforms big challenges into bite-sized, manageable pieces.
- Snuggyping – The Aries-Themed Teenieping of warmth. She is very cheery and kind, but incredibly oblivious to the fact that when she washes objects, they are reduced to the size of Teeniepings like herself.
- Lucyping – The Libra-Themed Teenieping of transparency. She is an incredibly timid, shy, and easily scared Star Teenieping who is nervous to be in Harmony Town. She unintentionally uses her magic whenever she feels threatened or scared.
- Togetherping – The Pictor-Themed Teenieping of teamwork, she believes that teamwork makes the dream work. She is always ready to help groups cooperate and combine their strengths to achieve a common goal.
- Swayping – The Orion-Themed Teenieping of excitement, a passionate dancer who lives for the rhythm of life. Her energy is contagious, and she loves to spread her enthusiasm by encouraging others to dance. Swayping's dancing skills are unmatched, and she uses her talent to help others feel better and more alive. Her love for movement and music transcends barriers, making everyone feel part of a joyful celebration. Through her passion for dance, Swayping helps bring out the best in others.
- Allureping – The Vulpecula-Themed Teenieping of bewitchment, she is very mischievous and playful.
- Doremiping – The Andromeda-Themed Teenieping of talent, she is calm and cheerful with a love of music.
- Sneakyping – The Ophiuchus-Themed Teenieping of usurpation, she is cunning and plans ahead for every move she takes.
- Kissyping – The Heiheionakeiki-Themed Teenieping of childlikeness, she is cheerful and sensitive, who loves to be with Princeping.

=== Royal Princess Teeniepings ===
- Graceping – The Royal Princess Teenieping of grace, she has a gentle exterior and a strong heart. She expresses her emotions through her body and may seem indifferent to her surroundings, but she actually pays more attention to her friends than anyone else and is like a graceful, noble swan.
- Claireping – The Royal Princess Teenieping of beauty; she has a pure, innocent personality. She possesses a purity and simplicity as pure as white, and acts according to her heart. She has a genius sense of fashion but is clumsy at anything outside it.
- Bonnyping – Royal Princess Teenieping of confidence, she has a cheerful, articulate, outgoing, and charismatic personality, and possesses the natural leadership qualities of an older sister. She believes that changing her hairstyle is the best way to change her mood, leads her friends, and is always the first to step up and protect them when danger arises.

=== Legend Princess Teeniepings ===
- Dianaping – The Legend Princess Teenieping of glory.
- Eclipseping – The Legend Princess Teenieping of seclusion.

=== Normal Princess Teeniepings ===
- Scrubping – The Teenieping of refreshment, she is committed to keeping everything clean, but often pushes herself too hard in this pursuit, even though it benefits everyone.
- Charmingping – The Teenieping of whimsy, she is enthusiastic but selective about appreciating others' charms. She assists others in enhancing their charm, even if her perspective on charm is somewhat narrow.
- Flitterping – The Teenieping of lightness, she loves giving wings to objects and making them fly, but can easily get scared and doubt herself. Despite this, she remains determined to help others.
- Silkyping – The Teenieping of adventure, who is adventurous, independent, and active. Although she looks gentle and docile, she has a bold, adventurous spirit and a love for colorful treasures.
- Snowping – The Teenieping of freezing, who is cute but stubborn. She wants to do whatever she wants and can become menacing when she is angered.
- Dewping – The Teenieping of innocence. She is calm, kind, and sensitive; she always wants to help everyone and everything around her to feel energized when they are exhausted. However, she does not always think things through, as her caring nature at times can prevent her from sensing danger or knowing when not to take risks.
- Dozyping – The Teenieping of dormancy, she is a Teenieping with poor sleeping habits. She is more active at night, but fails to get proper sleep, which not only makes her feel fatigued, but makes everyone else feel fatigue as well.
- Rellaping – The Teenieping of sincerity, she is kind and dedicated, but gullible and sensitive. She always wants to do the right thing, but gets tricked easily and becomes saddened when things don't go as planned.
- Glossyping – The Teenieping of growth. She is kind hearted and always willing to help others. She wants to do the right things, but can also be clueless when being led to do the wrong things, which saddens her.
- Cupidping – The Teenieping of revelation, she is an innocent baby Teenieping who enjoys using her arrows to make others spew out the truth deep inside. However, she is fully oblivious of the trouble this could cause, and does cause.
- Kittyping – The Teenieping of snootiness

=== Prince Teeniepings ===
- Charlesping – The Teenieping of honor. He is flirtatious, formal, and chivalrous, always ready to help "damsels in distress". However, he is also incompetent, clumsy, and dimwitted as his efforts to help often have terrible effects.
- Trotping – The Teenieping of merriness. He is charismatic, extroverted, dramatic, and chivalrous. He loves to perform as a singer, but doesn't take himself too seriously.
- Frogping – The Teenieping of slyness. He is charismatic and chivalrous like Charlesping and Trotping.
- Henryping – The Teenieping of politeness. He is the one who tried to warn Eclipseping, but turned into Frogping, because of Miroir's dark magic.

=== Jewel star Royalpings ===
- Lemonping – TBA
- Cherryping – TBA
- Limeping – TBA
- Romiping – The Princess of the Emotions Kingdom, who was turned into a Teenieping in the Season 5 episode "Romi Became A Teenieping" as Heartsping is her personal Teenieping, as she finds out who Noah really is...
- Choruspings – Two Teeniepings working as backup dancers that can be summoned by Trotping.

=== Villains ===
- Giggleping – The Genius of Tricks and Pranks is an unnamed and unidentified Emotion Teenieping that others call Giggleping. She is Happying's evil counterpart. She appears at the end of "The Arrow of Luvping." Her goal is to steal Romi's Magic Catcher. To do this, she teams up with the freed Teeniepings and manipulates them into helping her.
- Egoping – She is the Emotion Teenieping of selfishness, appearing as the Season 1 final boss. As the Forgotten Royal Emotion Teenieping, secretly working at Jennie's orders, she is the one who led Happying to transform into Giggleping and who controlled her evil ego, to ultimately get hold of Romi's Magic Catcher to build her own kingdom where the Teeniepings would be slaves.
- Maskping – She is a mysterious Teenieping appearing as the main antagonist of Twinkle Catch! Teenieping, as she releases the Jewel Teeniepings on Earth, tries to defeat Romi and Heartsping by relentlessly attacking them. At the end of the season, it is revealed that Maskping was only a disguise for Onlyping, who was working at Jennie's order to try to win over Romi.
- Jennie (제니) (voiced by Kang Eun-ae): She is a princess of the Emotions Kingdom. Introduced in Season 2 as Romi's cousin and heart-sister, a kind and innocent girl, she actually turns out to be the one who released all the Teeniepings since the beginning. After revealing her true colors, she becomes the main antagonist of Season 3, but then comes back to her senses and is given a second chance by everyone, allowing her to become nice again. Jennie had quite a troubled childhood, indeed: the disappearance of her parents made her progressively jealous of Romi, who had all the privileges, while she was terribly missing her own parents. Therefore, she, along with her personal Teenieping Onlyping, made many plans to make her life miserable. Fortunately, Romi and everyone allowed her to make a fresh start and get past her terrible past.
- Onlyping – she is the Jewel Teenieping of dedication, wielding the Tahitian black pearl who appears from Twinkle Catch! Teenieping onwards. Jennie's personal Teenieping; she debuts in "Memo This, Memoping" and as Maskping in "Twinkle Twinkle, Jewel Teeniepings."
- Puffping – he is the Dessert Teenieping of interest, themed around bubblegum. He appears as the main antagonist of Dessert Catch! Teenieping, where he steals the Magic Sugar Ball, which ends up releasing the Dessert Teeniepings and himself on Earth, and tries everything to keep the mysterious Magic Sugar Ball with him.
- Truffping – he is the Teenieping of trouble who appears in the movie, Heartsping: Teenieping of Love as the main antagonist. Prince Liam's personal Teenieping; he used to think that humans and Teeniepings cannot be friends because of the misunderstanding that Liam had abandoned him, but has come to understand that the opposite is true. Fortunately, he is able to reunite with Liam, clear the misunderstanding, and become friends again.
- Black Hole – The Black Hole (Korean: 블랙홀) is the main villain and the final boss of Star Catch! Teenieping. They are the ones who trapped Auroraping inside their body, and transported all of the Star Teeniepings to Earth.
- Eclipseping – The Legend Princess Teenieping of seclusion. She appears in the series of Princess Catch Teenieping as a false main antagonist and she is the one who got manipulated and corrupted by a mirror artifact named Miroir.
- Miroir — Miroir (Korean: 미루아르) is an ancient magical mirror artifact who is the final boss of Princess Catch Teenieping, and also existed in the Kingdom Of Mirrors. It is the only one who brainwashed Eclipseping, cursed the kingdom of mirrors and turned Henryping into Frogping. She sends Romi, Dianaping and all of the Royal Princess Teeniepings in her world as shown in episode 26. Then she gets defeated by Romi (as Princess Luminous and Princess Darkness). However, she is the first female villain in the show to die.

== Episodes ==
Season	Episodes	Originally released	
Season	Episodes	First released	Last released
1	52	March 19, 2020	April 1, 2021
2	26	September 22, 2021	March 16, 2022
3	26	September 14, 2022	March 8, 2023
4	26	September 22, 2023	March 29, 2024
5	26	October 10, 2024	May 1, 2025
6	26	October 30, 2025	May 21, 2026
7	20	November 18, 2026	TBA

=== Season 1 (2020–21) ===
No.	Title	Directed by	Written by	Original release date
1	"The Cookie Mess"	Unknown	Unknown	March 19, 2020
2	"A Very Charming Teenieping!"	Unknown	Unknown	March 26, 2020
3	"A Shy New Classmate"	Unknown	Unknown	April 2, 2020
4	"Dadaping, the Smart One"	Unknown	Unknown	April 9, 2020
5	"Who's the Best?"	Unknown	Unknown	April 16, 2020
6	"You Can Do It, Maya!"	Unknown	Unknown	April 23, 2020
7	"Oops, I Forgot!"	Unknown	Unknown	May 7, 2020
8	"Marylou's Tummyache"	Unknown	Unknown	May 14, 2020
9	"Welcome, Dear Hope!"	Unknown	Unknown	May 21, 2020
10	"What Does A Tear Candy Taste Like?"	Unknown	Unknown	May 28, 2020
11	"Find Moseyping!"	Unknown	Unknown	June 4, 2020
12	"Let's Sing With Joy"	Unknown	Unknown	June 11, 2020
13	"Mimicping Is A Fan"	Unknown	Unknown	June 18, 2020
14	"Don't Look at the Mirror!"	Unknown	Unknown	June 25, 2020
15	"Come Back Home, Heartsping!"	Unknown	Unknown	July 2, 2020
16	"Spooky Picture Time"	Unknown	Unknown	July 9, 2020
17	"Love Me More"	Unknown	Unknown	July 16, 2020
18	"Unforgettable Birthday Party"	Unknown	Unknown	July 23, 2020
19	"Find The Lucky Stamp"	Unknown	Unknown	July 30, 2020
20	"Gonna Tweet It All!"	Unknown	Unknown	August 6, 2020
21	"The Bubble Gum Disaster"	Unknown	Unknown	August 13, 2020
22	"Greedy Allmineping"	Unknown	Unknown	August 20, 2020
23	"Angry Roarping"	Unknown	Unknown	August 27, 2020
24	"Dadaping Is Everywhere"	Unknown	Unknown	September 3, 2020
25	"That's a No, Nonoping!"	Unknown	Unknown	September 10, 2020
26	"The Arrow Of Luvping"	Unknown	Unknown	September 17, 2020
27	"Likey The Pranks, Giggleping!"	Unknown	Unknown	September 24, 2020
28	"Too Cold, Coolping!"	Unknown	Unknown	October 8, 2020
29	"The Art is Alive!"	Unknown	Unknown	October 15, 2020
30	"Maya The Little Princess"	Unknown	Unknown	October 22, 2020
31	"Phew, Too Heavy!"	Unknown	Unknown	October 29, 2020
32	"The Upside Down World"	Unknown	Unknown	November 5, 2020
33	"Five Romis"	Unknown	Unknown	November 12, 2020
34	"Zipping Likes It Fast"	Unknown	Unknown	September 19, 2020
35	"Do You Wanna Be A Baby?"	Unknown	Unknown	November 26, 2020
36	"Aliens at Heartrose!"	Unknown	Unknown	December 3, 2020
37	"The Sleeping Beauty Of Heartrose"	Unknown	Unknown	December 10, 2020
38	"Stuck With Lena"	Unknown	Unknown	December 17, 2020
39	"The Funny Monster"	Unknown	Unknown	December 24, 2020
40	"Teenieping Carnival"	Unknown	Unknown	December 31, 2020
41	"It's Play Time!"	Unknown	Unknown	January 7, 2021
42	"A Strange Guest At Heartrose"	Unknown	Unknown	January 14, 2021
43	"The Flower Incident"	Unknown	Unknown	January 21, 2021
44	"Baby Noriping!"	Unknown	Unknown	January 28, 2021
45	"Happying's Back"	Unknown	Unknown	February 4, 2021
46	"Princess Sunshine"	Unknown	Unknown	February 18, 2021
47	"Trouble In The Library"	Unknown	Unknown	February 25, 2021
48	"The Coolest Friendship"	Unknown	Unknown	March 4, 2021
49	"The Electric Touch"	Unknown	Unknown	March 11, 2021
50	"Teenieping From The Ocean"	Unknown	Unknown	March 18, 2021
51	"In The Name Of The Royalpings"	Unknown	Unknown	March 25, 2021
52	"Princess Veronica"	Unknown	Unknown	April 1, 2021

=== Season 2: Twinkle (2021–22) ===
No.	Title	Directed by	Written by	Original release date
1	"Twinkle Twinkle, Jewel Teeniepings"	Unknown	Unknown	September 22, 2021
2	"Welcome to Teenieping School!"	Unknown	Unknown	September 29, 2021
3	"Tickle Tickle, Try Not to Laugh!"	Unknown	Unknown	October 6, 2021
4	"Ow Ow, No More Boo-Boos!"	Unknown	Unknown	October 13, 2021
5	"Wishping's Three Wishes"	Unknown	Unknown	October 20, 2021
6	"Pat Pat~ It's Ok~"	Unknown	Unknown	October 27, 2021
7	"Shrinking Romi!"	Unknown	Unknown	November 3, 2021
8	"Tidy Up Until It Sparkles!"	Unknown	Unknown	November 10, 2021
9	"Top Chef Yummyping"	Unknown	Unknown	November 17, 2021
10	"Trustping Has Fainted!"	Unknown	Unknown	November 24, 2021
11	"Things Get Wooly!"	Unknown	Unknown	December 1, 2021
12	"The Teddy Bear is Alive?!"	Unknown	Unknown	December 8, 2021
13	"Another Princess"	Unknown	Unknown	December 15, 2021
14	"Memo This, Memoping!"	Unknown	Unknown	December 22, 2021
15	"Royal Teenieping Face-Off!"	Unknown	Unknown	December 29, 2021
16	"Heartrose Becomes a Kingdom"	Unknown	Unknown	January 5, 2022
17	"A Jewel Teenieping Heist!"	Unknown	Unknown	January 12, 2022
18	"Who's the Real Heartsping?"	Unknown	Unknown	January 19, 2022
19	"Find the Gift Box!"	Unknown	Unknown	January 26, 2022
20	"Where's My Muse, Sculpt?"	Unknown	Unknown	February 2, 2022
21	"A Perilous Picnic"	Unknown	Unknown	February 9, 2022
22	"Twirl Whirl Teenieping Ballet"	Unknown	Unknown	February 16, 2022
23	"Wonderping, the Hero Teenieping"	Unknown	Unknown	February 23, 2022
24	"Teenieping School Graduation"	Unknown	Unknown	March 2, 2022
25	"Heartsping in Danger"	Unknown	Unknown	March 9, 2022
26	"The Jewel Forest is Restored"	Unknown	Unknown	March 16, 2022

=== Season 3: Secret (2022–23) ===
No.	Title	Directed by	Written by	Original release date
1	"Secret Catch! Key Teeniepings"	Unknown	Unknown	September 14, 2022
2	"Transform! Floraheart"	Unknown	Unknown	September 21, 2022
3	"Overeating is Dangerous, Yum Yum!"	Unknown	Unknown	September 28, 2022
4	"Hot, Hot, Camping Commotion"	Unknown	Unknown	October 5, 2022
5	"I'll Treat You, Cure!"	Unknown	Unknown	October 12, 2022
6	"Hospital For Teeniepings"	Unknown	Unknown	October 19, 2022
7	"Come on, Okeydokeyping! Let's go get them!"	Unknown	Unknown	October 26, 2022
8	"Please Repair This, Handyping"	Unknown	Unknown	November 2, 2022
9	"Romi And Heartsping's Bodies Are Switched"	Unknown	Unknown	November 9, 2022
10	"Snow White Romi"	Unknown	Unknown	November 16, 2022
11	"Fashionping's Design Ideas"	Unknown	Unknown	November 23, 2022
12	"Freeze! Justiceping"	Unknown	Unknown	November 30, 2022
13	"Lucky Cookie Full Of Fortune"	Unknown	Unknown	December 7, 2022
14	"Splash, Splashping!"	Unknown	Unknown	December 14, 2022
15	"Let's Party With Partyping"	Unknown	Unknown	December 21, 2022
16	"Get a Cool Hairstyle, Styleping"	Unknown	Unknown	December 28, 2022
17	"Dad's Camera"	Unknown	Unknown	January 4, 2023
18	"I'll Get Huffy, Huffyping"	Unknown	Unknown	January 11, 2023
19	"Find Romi's Necklace!"	Unknown	Unknown	January 18, 2023
20	"Ariaping The Singer"	Unknown	Unknown	January 25, 2023
21	"Teenieping Amusement Park For Everyone"	Unknown	Unknown	February 1, 2023
22	"Twirl, Twirl on Skates"	Unknown	Unknown	February 8, 2023
23	"Luckyping Unboxed!"	Unknown	Unknown	February 15, 2023
24	"Teenieping Fashion Show"	Unknown	Unknown	February 22, 2023
25	"Mystic Town on a Thread"	Unknown	Unknown	March 1, 2023
26	"Goodbye, Key Teeniepings"	Unknown	Unknown	March 8, 2023

=== Season 4: Dessert (2023–24) ===
No.	Title	Directed by	Written by	Original release date
1	"Sweet Dessert Teeniepings"	Unknown	Unknown	September 22, 2023
2	"Transform! Princess Berryheart"	Unknown	Unknown	September 22, 2023
3	"I'll Make It Pretty, Meringue"	Unknown	Unknown	October 5, 2023
4	"The Secret of Sandping and Sandwich Cookies"	Unknown	Unknown	October 5, 2023
5	"Catch Puffping"	Unknown	Unknown	October 12, 2023
6	"I Want To Be a Royal Teenieping"	Unknown	Unknown	October 19, 2023
7	"Go Flat! Waffleping"	Unknown	Unknown	October 26, 2023
8	"Whirl, Swirl, Spin, Lolliping"	Unknown	Unknown	November 9, 2023
9	"Fluffyping and Her Little Friends"	Unknown	Unknown	November 16, 2023
10	"I'll Make It Colorful, Macaping"	Unknown	Unknown	November 23, 2023
11	"Stack It Up, Pancakeping"	Unknown	Unknown	November 30, 2023
12	"Jellyping Is a Softie"	Unknown	Unknown	December 7, 2023
13	"Romi Goes to Dessert Town"	Unknown	Unknown	December 14, 2023
14	"Don't Cry, Cupping and Muffping"	Unknown	Unknown	December 21, 2023
15	"Babysitting Is Hard"	Unknown	Unknown	December 28, 2023
16	"Shashaping Will Cure You"	Unknown	Unknown	January 4, 2024
17	"Good-Night-Yodel-Ay-Hee- Yogurts"	Unknown	Unknown	January 11, 2024
18	"Ice Princess Iceflakeping"	Unknown	Unknown	January 18, 2024
19	"Pudding, Pudding, Pudding Dance"	Unknown	Unknown	January 25, 2024
20	"Cushy, Cushy Marshmallow"	Unknown	Unknown	February 1, 2024
21	"Let's All Get Along With Chocolate Hats"	Unknown	Unknown	February 8, 2024
22	"Sweet Tangy Legend Teeniepings"	Unknown	Unknown	February 15, 2024
23	"Sweet and Tangy Dessert Party"	Unknown	Unknown	February 22, 2024
24	"Come back, Puffping"	Unknown	Unknown	February 29, 2024
25	"Back to Dessert Town"	Unknown	Unknown	March 7, 2024
26	"Hearts in one: Harmonious"	Unknown	Unknown	March 14, 2024

=== Season 5: Star (2024–25) ===
No.	Title	Directed by	Written by	Original release date
1	"The Girl Who Came Upon A Star"	Unknown	Unknown	October 10, 2024
2	"Hop Hop Hopping"	Unknown	Unknown	October 17, 2024
3	"Queen of Hula Hoop"	Unknown	Unknown	October 24, 2024
4	"Share The Light, Giverping"	Unknown	Unknown	October 31, 2024
5	"The Delivery Has Arrived, Dingdongping"	Unknown	Unknown	November 7, 2024
6	"The Royal Teeniepings Who Became Lost In Space"	Unknown	Unknown	November 14, 2024
7	"Wandering Petitping"	Unknown	Unknown	November 21, 2024
8	"Dazzleping Doesn't Stop"	Unknown	Unknown	November 28, 2024
9	"Stickerping With Stickers"	Unknown	Unknown	December 5, 2024
10	"The Strong Teenieping, Mightyping"	Unknown	Unknown	December 12, 2024
11	"I Want To Meet You, Ellaping, Bellaping"	Unknown	Unknown	December 19, 2024
12	"Snuggyping's Fluffy Laundry"	Unknown	Unknown	December 26, 2024
13	"I Want To Become Transparent, Lucyping"	Unknown	Unknown	January 2, 2025
14	"Noah Comes To Heartrose"	Unknown	Unknown	January 9, 2025
15	"Let's Do It Together, Togetherping"	Unknown	Unknown	January 16, 2025
16	"Swayping's Dance is Five Stars"	Unknown	Unknown	January 23, 2025
17	"Naughty Allureping"	Unknown	Unknown	January 30, 2025
18	"Singing With Doremiping"	Unknown	Unknown	February 6, 2025
19	"Finding Petitping"	Unknown	Unknown	February 13, 2025
20	"Romi Became a Teenieping"	Unknown	Unknown	February 20, 2025
21	"Steal Secretly! Sneakyping"	Unknown	Unknown	February 27, 2025
22	"Follow Kissyping and Go Thirty Thousand Miles"	Unknown	Unknown	March 6, 2025
23	"Memories of the Stars"	Unknown	Unknown	March 13, 2025
24	"Star Teeniepings, Gather the Power of Stars"	Unknown	Unknown	March 20, 2025
25	"Auroraping of Promise"	Unknown	Unknown	March 27, 2025
26	"The Aurora That Connects Hearts"	Unknown	Unknown	April 3, 2025

=== Season 6: Princess (2025–26) ===
No.	Title	Directed by	Written by	Original release date
1	"Departure! The Princess Summit Train"	Unknown	Unknown	October 30, 2025
2	"Who Are You in the Mirror?"	Unknown	Unknown	November 6, 2025
3	"Scrubping Is Scrub Scrub Scrub"	Unknown	Unknown	November 13, 2025
4	"I'll Help You Find Your Charm, Charmingping"	Unknown	Unknown	November 20, 2025
5	"Give Me Wings, Flitterping"	Unknown	Unknown	November 27, 2025
6	"Silkyping and the Magic Carpet"	Unknown	Unknown	December 4, 2025
7	"The Three Musketeers Teeniepings"	Unknown	Unknown	December 11, 2025
8	"Cold and Frozen, Snowping"	Unknown	Unknown	December 18, 2025
9	"Leave the Sewing to Claireping"	Unknown	Unknown	December 25, 2025
10	"Spy Operation"	Unknown	Unknown	January 1, 2026
11	"A Single Drop of Dew from Dewping"	Unknown	Unknown	January 8, 2026
12	"I Really Love Taking Naps! Dozyping"	Unknown	Unknown	January 15, 2026
13	"Eclipsebot's Attack"	Unknown	Unknown	January 22, 2026
14	"Turn Back Time, Rellaping"	Unknown	Unknown	January 29, 2026
15	"The Secret of Gwigok Mountain Lodge"	Unknown	Unknown	February 5, 2026
16	"Long Hair Fluttering and Glossyping"	Unknown	Unknown	February 12, 2026
17	"The Spinning Mirror"	Unknown	Unknown	February 19, 2026
18	"Bonnyping of Temptation"	Unknown	Unknown	February 26, 2026
19	"Heart-to-Heart, Cupidping"	Unknown	Unknown	March 5, 2026
20	"Heartsping's Observation Log: Graceping"	Unknown	Unknown	March 12, 2026
21	"Stop, Eclipseping"	Unknown	Unknown	March 19, 2026
22	"The Truth About Eclipseping"	Unknown	Unknown	March 26, 2026
23	"Hide and Seek! Kittyping"	Unknown	Unknown	April 2, 2026
24	"The Princess Ball"	Unknown	Unknown	April 9, 2026
25	"Beyond the Mirror"	Unknown	Unknown	April 16, 2026
26	"With One Heart"	Unknown	Unknown	May 21, 2026

=== Season 7: Jewel (2026–27) ===
No.	Title	Directed by	Written by	Original release date
1	"Opening! Emotion Festival"	TBA	TBA	November 18, 2026
2	TBA	TBA	TBA	TBA
3	TBA	TBA	TBA	TBA
4	TBA	TBA	TBA	TBA
5	TBA	TBA	TBA	TBA
6	TBA	TBA	TBA	TBA
7	TBA	TBA	TBA	TBA
8	TBA	TBA	TBA	TBA
9	TBA	TBA	TBA	TBA
10	TBA	TBA	TBA	TBA
11	TBA	TBA	TBA	TBA
12	TBA	TBA	TBA	TBA
13	TBA	TBA	TBA	TBA
14	TBA	TBA	TBA	TBA
15	TBA	TBA	TBA	TBA
16	TBA	TBA	TBA	TBA
17	TBA	TBA	TBA	TBA
18	TBA	TBA	TBA	TBA
19	TBA	TBA	TBA	TBA
20	TBA	TBA	TBA	TBA

== Broadcast ==
Catch! Teenieping premiered on KBS2 in South Korea on 19 March 2020. The series has also been released on VODs and video platforms. The first season aired on KBS2 every Thursday at 5:15 pm until 1 April 2021. The second season of the series was broadcast on JEI TV every Wednesday, starting 22 September 2021, at 8:30 am. The same episode would be rebroadcast at 6:30 pm. To celebrate the second season, JEI TV held a poll in October 2021 to encourage viewers to pick their favorite characters.

On 12 July 2021, it was first broadcast in China under the title 奇妙萌可 on Chinese streaming platforms. The first season of the series premiered on Netflix on 30 October 2021. It ranked No. 5 in Australia and No. 9 in North America on Netflix's trending kids' content list. It aired in Japan on Kids Station on 3 December 2022. Russian dubbing was released on 14 August on STS Kids.

== Film ==
=== Prequel ===
- Heartsping: Teenieping of Love
- Catch! Teenieping: Legend of the Whale Heartstone
- Catch! Teenieping Prequel Final

=== Sequel ===
- Catch! Teenieping Sequel Film 2030

== Music ==
=== Opening songs ===
- Season 1: "CATCH PING : Fairies of Emotion opening song", performed by Kim Yurim.
- Season 2: "Sparkling Catch! title", performed by Lee Jeongeun.
- Season 3: "Catch! Teenieping S3 Opening Song"
- Season 4: "Catch! Teenieping S4 Opening Song"
- Season 5: "Star Catch! Teenieping Title Song"
- Season 6: "Princess Catch! Teenieping Title Song"
- Season 7: "Jewel Star Catch! Teenieping S7 Opening Song"

performed by Liz from IVE.

=== Insert songs ===
==== Season 1 songs ====
CATCH PING : Fairies of Emotion

- CATCH PING : Fairies of Emotion title
- CATCH PING : Fairies of Emotion title (MR)
- CATCH PING : Fairies of Emotion opening song

CATCH PING : Kid's dance song

- "Teenieping song", Lee Jeongeun
- "Heartsping song", Cho Gyeongi
- "Princess Romi song", Jang Yena

==== Season 2 songs ====
- Sparkling Catch! Teenieping title
- Teenieping Halloween song
- Teenieping Mas
- Teenieping Graduation song

=== Season 3 songs ===
- TBA

=== Others ===
- "Hi", Jang Yena, 1:34

== Reception ==
Catch! Teenieping received mixed reviews from critics and audiences. Stephanie Morgan of Common Sense Media rated the show 2 out of 5 stars, applauding it as "light on meaningful content, focusing more on entertainment through slapstick humor and magical antics." She praised the animation and the scenarios, but the "lack of consequences following bad behavior might not sit well with parents looking for more educational content." In conclusion, "there are many better shows out there for young viewers."

The series is considered "popular among preschoolers and elementary school pupils" in Korea. It is also said to be one of the Korean series that are "hugely popular shows in the Asian market with 35 billion views in China alone." In 2023, the first character-based indoor theme park, based on the series, was launched.

Between 28 March and 29 April 2025, the series also appeared in a collaboration event with Cookie Run: OvenBreak, with Heartsping and Twinkleping appearing as playable characters obtainable for the duration of the event.
