= Crusher (disambiguation) =

A crusher is a machine designed to reduce large solid chunks of raw material into smaller ones.

Crusher, Crushers or The Crusher may also refer to:

== People ==
- "Crusher", nickname of Noel Cleal (born 1958), Australian former rugby league footballer
- "Crusher Yurkof", early ring name for professional wrestler Bam Bam Bigelow (1961–2007)
- Jerry Blackwell (1949–1995), American professional wrestler known as "Crusher Blackwell"
- Judith Collins (born 1959), New Zealand politician and lawyer known as "Crusher Collins"
- "Krusher Khruschev", early ring name for professional wrestler Barry Darsow (born 1959)
- "Crusher Bloomfield" and "Crusher Gray", early ring names for professional wrestler One Man Gang (born George Gray in 1960)
- The Crusher (wrestler), ring name of Reginald Lisowski, a former professional wrestler
- Steve Casey (1908–1987), Irish rower and professional wrestler known as "Crusher Casey"
- Yusuke Kawaguchi (born 1980), Japanese mixed martial artist and professional wrestler
- Connor Michalek (2005–2014), professional wrestling fan nicknamed "The Crusher"

== Fictional characters ==
- Absorbing Man (Carl "Crusher" Creel), a Marvel Comics villain
- Crusher, the name of an Earth-element character in Skylanders: Giants
- Beverly Crusher, Jack Crusher, and Wesley Crusher, in the television series Star Trek: The Next Generation and in some cases the related films
- Crusher, a recurring character in TV show The Simpsons
- Crusher (comics), three Marvel Comics villains
- Crusher Joe, science fiction light novels by Haruka Takachiho (also exist as an animated film)
- Crusher, or Moses, in the anime series Beyblade: see BEGA League
- Milburn or "Crusher", in the British sitcom Last of the Summer Wine
- Crusher, a recurring sometimes antagonistic character from Blaze and the Monster Machines

== Music ==
- Crusher (album), a 2026 album by Sooj
- The Crusher (album), a 2001 album by melodic death metal band Amon Amarth
- "The Crusher", a song by Dee Dee King
- "The Crusher", a song by the Ramones from Adios Amigos

== Sports teams ==
=== Canada ===
- Orangeville Crushers, a former Canadian Junior "A" ice hockey team from Orangeville, Ontario
- Pictou County Crushers, a Canadian junior ice hockey team based in New Glasgow, Nova Scotia
- Shallow Lake Crushers, a senior hockey team based out of Shallow Lake, Ontario

=== United States ===
- Connecticut Crushers, a women's American football team based in Hartford, Connecticut
- Lake Erie Crushers, a Frontier League professional baseball team based in Avon, Ohio
- Sonoma County Crushers, a former minor league baseball team in California

=== Elsewhere ===
- Caithness Crushers, a Scottish rugby league team based in Thurso
- South Queensland Crushers, an Australian rugby league team

== Other uses ==
- Crusher (robot), a military robot vehicle
- The Crusher (1917 film), an American silent film
- A potato masher, or crusher
- A former name of Katoomba railway station in New South Wales, Australia

== See also ==
- Crush (disambiguation)
- Crushed (disambiguation)
