= Ryōta Yamaguchi =

Japanese anime screenwriter

Ryōta Yamaguchi (山口 亮太, Yamaguchi Ryōta; born March 2, 1969) is a Japanese anime screenwriter often associated with Studio Deen, Toei Animation, and Sunrise.

He penned a number of scripts for Sunrise's anime TV series The Vision of Escaflowne, as well as writing the movie version, Escaflowne: A Girl in Gaea with director Kazuki Akane. He also worked on scripts for the 2002 Kanon anime television series.

His other major works include Ranma ½, Sailor Moon Sailor Stars, Cutey Honey Flash, Medabots, Digimon Beatbreak, Digimon Savers, DokiDoki! PreCure, and Blue Exorcist.

== Anime ==
=== Television ===
- series head writer denoted in bold
- Madö King Granzört (1989): as Shizumu Higa
- Mashin Hero Wataru 2 (1991): as Shizumu Higa
- Mama wa Shōgaku 4 Nensei (1992)
- Ranma ½ Nettohen (1992)
- Super Zugan (1992–1993)
- Shippū! Iron Leaguer (1993–1994)
- Mobile Fighter G Gundam (1994–1995)
- **Zenki** (1995)
- Sailor Moon SuperS (1995–1996)
- Kuma no Putaro (1995–1996)
- The Vision of Escaflowne (1996)
- **Sailor Moon Sailor Stars** (1996–1997)
- Revolutionary Girl Utena (1997): as Noboru Higa
- You're Under Arrest (1993–1996)
- Don't Leave Me Alone, Daisy (1997)
- **Cutie Honey Flash** (1997–1998)
- Cowboy Bebop (1998)
- **Nightwalker: The Midnight Detective** (1998)
- Shadow Skill (1998)
- Kocchi Muite! Miiko (1998–1999)
- **Hatsumei Boy Kanipan** (1998–1999)
- **Chō Hatsumei Boy Kanipan** (1999)
- I'm Gonna Be An Angel! (1999)
- **Medabots** (1999–2000)
- Great Teacher Onizuka (1999–2000)
- Hunter × Hunter (1999–2001)
- Ghost Stories (2000–2001)
- You're Under Arrest 2 (2001)
- UFO Baby (2001)
- **Kanon** (2002)
- One Piece (2002–2003)
- Duel Masters (2002–2003)
- **Crush Gear Nitro** (2003–2004)
- **Diamond Daydreams** (2004)
- Zukkoke Sanningumi Kusunoki Yashiki no Guruguru-sama (2004)
- Tetsujin 28-go (2004)
- Duel Masters Charge (2004–2006)
- Mushiking: The King of Beetles (2005–2006)
- Zoids: Genesis (2005–2006)
- **Project Blue Earth SOS** (2006)
- Happiness! (2006)
- **Digimon Data Squad** (2006–2007)
- Kono Aozora ni Yakusoku o (2007)
- Zenmai Zamurai (2007)
- Kyo Kara Maoh! Third Series (2008)
- Psychic Squad (2008)
- Hakuoki ~Shinsengumi Kitan~ (2010)
- **Blue Exorcist** (2011)
- **DokiDoki! PreCure** (2013–2014)
- Gaist Crusher (2013–2014)
- Shōnen Maid (2016)
- Future Card Buddyfight Triple D (2016–2017)
- Cardfight!! Vanguard Prime (2018–2019)
- Saint Seiya: Saintia Shō (2018–2019)
- **Kochoki** (2019)
- Cardfight!! Vanguard Gaiden if (2020)
- **Catch! Teenieping** (2020–present)
- **Metal Cardbot** (2023–present)
- **Digimon Beatbreak** (2025-2026)

=== OVAs ===
- series head writer denoted in bold
- Madö King Granzört: An Adventure Story (1992)
- Ranma ½
  - OVA (1993–1994)
  - Special (1994–1995)
  - Super (1995–1996)
  - Nightmare! Incense of Spring Sleep (2008)
- Tekken: The Motion Picture (1998)
- **Gosen Zosan e** (1998–1999)
- **Oni-Tensei** (2000)
- **Arcade Gamer Fubuki** (2002–2003)
- Mizuiro (2003)

=== Films ===
- Ranma ½
  - Big Trouble in Nekonron, China (1991)
  - Nihao, My Concubine (1992)
  - Super Indiscriminate Decisive Battle! Team Ranma vs. the Legendary Phoenix (1994)
- Sailor Moon SuperS: The Movie (1995)
- Cutie Honey Flash: The Movie (1997)
- Escaflowne (2000)
- Digimon Data Squad: Ultimate Power! Activate Burst Mode!! (2006)
- DokiDoki! PreCure the Movie: Mana's Getting Married!? The Dress of Hope Tied to the Future! (2013)

== Live action ==
=== Television ===
- Kyuukyuu Sentai GoGoFive (1999–2000)
- Mirai Sentai Timeranger (2000)
- Sengoku Basara: Midnight Party (2012)

=== Films ===
- Mirai Sentai Timeranger vs. GoGoFive (2001)
- Sengoku Basara: Midnight Party Remix (2012)
