= Monk Little Dog =

2009 French-South Korean TV series or program

- Genre: Comedy
- Created by: Natalys Raut-Sieuzac; Kim Sung-jae
- Voices of: David Gasman; Sharon Mann; Matthew Géczy
- Countries of origin: France; South Korea
- Original language: None
- No. of seasons: 1
- No. of episodes: 52

Production
- Producers: Sandrine Hguyen; Boris Hertzog; Suhoon Kim
- Running time: 3 minutes
- Production companies: Kim's Licensing; Timoon Animation; SAMG Animation; Millimages

Original release
- Network: Canal+ EBS
- Release: June 16, 2009 – June 11, 2010

Monk Little Dog (French: Monk: La cata sur pattes; Korean: 멍크) is a series of animated shorts. The series was conceptualized by Kim Sung-jae of Kim's Licensing, and produced by Timoon Animation, SAMG Animation and Millimages. Monk Little Dog premiered on June 16, 2009 on Canal+ in France and ran until June 11, 2010.

In the UK the series was broadcast by the CITV Channel and in Australia by ABC3. In Indonesia, the series originally aired on Global TV (now GTV) from 2011 until early 2012, but later moved to RTV in 2014 until 2016, while in Latin America, it was broadcast on Cartoon Network and Boomerang.

== Characters ==
=== Main characters ===
- Monk: A white bull terrier, he is the eponymous main protagonist of the series. He is cheerful, but also clueless and chronically unlucky.
- Ding: A yellow English cocker spaniel, he is Monk's arch-rival and Kimmy's love interest.
- Kimmy: A pink poodle, she is Monk's crush and Ding's girlfriend.
- Ben: A brown and tan Bloodhound, he is Monk's best friend who's very lazy and always asleep.

=== Recurring characters ===
- Sushi is Kimmy's pet pussycat who has a love–hate relationship with Monk.
- Bubul is a gray pit bull who is Monk's best neighbour.
- Bar is a funny and hilarious American Bulldog who does not appear so much.
- Loo is a brown chow-chow.
- Mi-hie is a comic book superhero and Monk's favorite character.
- Peace is a naughty and smart lebrel.
- San-say is a female dog who is a master of karate and kung-fu.
- Sally is Bubul's wife.
- Jimmy is an emo Old English Sheepdog who is Kimmy's cousin.
- The Tweets are Monk's house owners.
- Mr. Beaky is Monk's pet parrot who only appears in "Monk and the Birthday Cake".
- Nonk and Jonk are Monk's parents. The father is identical to him, but with mustache and brown hat. The mother is similar to Kimmy, but mint blue instead of pale pink.
- Mimmy is a gold-amber-yellow poodle report similar to Kimmy, but light gold color.
- Len is Ben's dad who only appears on Monk's TV.

== Episodes ==
No.	Title	Original release date	Prod. code
1	"Monk Hammers a Nail"	June 16, 2009	101
Monk wants to hang a picture of Kimmy on her wall, but it goes out of control and Monk destroys Kimmi's house.
2	"Monk on a Desert Island"	June 23, 2009	102
Monk, Kimmi, and eventually, Ding get stuck on a desert island, and they try to save him.
3	"Monk Watches TV"	July 7, 2009	103
Monk is very excited to watch his favorite TV series "The Mi-hie Adventure", but Ding and Loo annoy Monk.
4	"Monk Goes Ballooning"	July 14, 2009	104
Monk and Kimmi go for ballooning, but Ding charges madly to Monk.
5	"Monk Takes a Bath"	July 21, 2009	105
Monk takes a bath with perfumed shampoos.
6	"Monk the Babysitter"	July 28, 2009	106
Monk meets Kimmi's pet, Sushi, and begins with "left foot".
7	"Monk Has Really Got to Go"	August 4, 2009	107
Monk eats too many hot dogs and needs to go to the toilet.
8	"Monk Goes Fishing"	August 11, 2009	108
Monk goes to fishing, but the others' way is very old.
9	"Monk at the Beach"	August 18, 2009	109
Monk has a good vacation on the beach with his friends.
10	"Monk Goes Skiing"	August 25, 2009	110
Monk goes skiing in the snow.
11	"Monk Plays Tennis"	September 1, 2009	111
Monk plays tennis with his friends.
12	"Monk at the Ice Skating Rink"	September 8, 2009	112
Monk goes to skate.
13	"Monk's Breakfast"	September 15, 2009	113
Monk likes to eat some toast for his breakfast.
14	"Monk Sends a Postcard"	September 29, 2009	114
Monk sends a postcard for a friend.
15	"Monk's Great Jump Stunt"	October 6, 2009	115
Monk buys a trampoline and tries to make a great jump stunt, but Kimmy and Dink annoy him.
16	"Monk Mows the Lawn"	October 13, 2009	116
Monk tries to mow the lawn, but his lawn mower goes madly.
17	"Monk Wants to Sleep"	October 20, 2009	117
Monk and Ben stay at home, but Ben is scared and hoarse.
18	"Monk and Mouch"	October 27, 2009	118
Monk tries to make friends with a bull shark.
19	"Monk's Picnic"	November 3, 2009	119
Monk goes for a picnic, but a wasp annoys Monk.
20	"Monk Goes Climbing"	November 10, 2009	120
Monk has gone to a trip to the mountains, where he is forced to sleep with Ben after his tent breaks down. The next day when he gets up he spots Kimmi with Ding. When he sees a daisy to give Ben on the top of a hill, Monk tries to get it. While Monk is trying to climb the mountain, Kimmi tells Ding to get the daisy for her. Monk then sees Ding and he goes down with the daisy and gives it to Kimmi. Monk gets mad and does his iconic yell on the top of the mountain like Tarzan, which everyone hears even Ben, Ding and Kimmi. Monk then falls off.
21	"Monk and the Magic Mirror"	November 17, 2009	121
Monk looks a new mirror.
22	"Monk Cleans the Facade of His House"	November 24, 2009	122
Monk tries to clean his house, but it ends badly.
23	"Monk's Moon Adventure"	December 1, 2009	123
Monk tries to make a space moon stunt, but he fails a lot.
24	"Monk Plays with a Boomerang"	December 8, 2009	124
Monk plays with Kimmi and Ding's boomerang.
25	"Monk the Artist"	December 15, 2009	125
Monk makes a statue of himself after Ding gets a statue of himself.
26	"Dance Up, Monk!"	December 22, 2009	126
Kimmi teaches Monk, Ding, Ben, Sally and Bubul dancing ballet lessons.
27	"Monk and the Big Madly Birthday Cake!"	December 29, 2009	127
Monk tries to make a birthday cake for Kimmi, but the things go madly.
28	"Monk Meets Bubul"	January 5, 2010	128
Monk thinks that his neighbor Bubul is scary.
29	"Monk Does the Laundry"	January 12, 2010	129
Monk orders a new washing machine, but it starts washing other things rather than laundry.
30	"Monk at the North Pole"	January 19, 2010	130
Monk tries to make the most of it when he tries to enjoy his day at the North Pole.
31	"Monk the Treasure Hunter"	January 26, 2010	131
Monk finds some treasure, but he gets trapped with his friends on a dangerous rainforest.
32	"Monk and the Hidden Camera"	February 2, 2010	132
Monk tries pranking his friends, but he gets pranked too.
33	"Mon-Karate"	February 8, 2010	133
Monk learns kung fu, but a naughty toad outdoes him.
34	"Monk Time Travels"	February 15, 2010	134
Monk tries to back in time, but he ends on the present.
35	"Monk's Sports Day"	February 21, 2010	135
Monk makes sports with his friends, but he loses and gets rejected in the end.
36	"Monk Makes Exercise"	February 28, 2010	136
Monk makes to exercise to impress Kimmy, but soon he is tricked and gets kicked away by Kimmy.
37	"Monk the Greather"	March 7, 2010	137
Monk gets a new speedy-faster racing motorcycle, but it goes out of control by Ding's fault.
38	"Monk Meets Quack-Quack"	March 14, 2010	138
Today is the anniversary of the time when Monk first got Quack-Quack at a fair, but when he got home at that time, Ben wanted to use Quack-Quack for an ugly turkey, and then it got attacked by a hawk, but it then got saved by Monk. In the present day, Monk drops Quack-Quack, and Quack-Quack starts having a mind of his own.
39	"Monk Celebrates Christmas"	March 21, 2010	139
Monk tries to decorate a Christmas Tree, but the tree explodes in the end, making Monk sad.
40	"Monk the Magician"	March 28, 2010	140
Monk makes magic, but his disappearing act is not too good.
41	"Monk, Mouch, and the Toothache"	April 3, 2010	141
Monk reunites with Mouch, but Mouch gets a toothache, and he tries to get it out with Ben.
42	"Monk Goes Curling"	April 10, 2010	142
Monk plays curling with his friends.
43	"Monk on Mission Impossible"	April 17, 2010	143
Monk hears screaming from Bubul's house, and he tries to sneak into it. It turns out Bubul was dancing and he was getting hurt with Sally.
44	"Monk, the Master of Ceremonies"	April 24, 2010	144
Monk makes the most of it when he enters his goldfish into a pet show.
45	"Monk Plays Golf"	May 1, 2010	145
Monk plays golf, but his friends out-do him.
46	"Monk's Great Racing Kart"	May 8, 2010	146
Monk invites his friends to play the best racing car game.
47	"Monk Crashes a Dinner Party"	May 15, 2010	147
Monk gets invited into Ding's house, but he ruins his dinner.
48	"Monk the Movie Star"	May 21, 2010	148
Monk becomes involved in the new Mi-hie movie.
49	"Monk, We've Lost"	May 21, 2010	149
Monk loses his memory.
50	"Monk the Superhero"	May 28, 2010	150
Monk gains the ability to fly, but ultimately fares the worst.
51	"Monk, Quack-Quack, and the Little Chick"	June 4, 2010	151
Monk defends his Quack-Quack from a hilarious and mad chicken.
52	"Monk Investigates"	June 11, 2010	152
Monk tries to find and seeks Ben.

== Development ==
Monk Little Dog originated from a series of storybooks with plasticine characters released in 2006, and one of the notable books include Monk's Mouth Country Trip (Korean: 멍크의 입속 나라 여행), although its development as an animated series goes back to 2005. The storybook series included one human character, whereas Monk Little Dog did not.
