= SAMG Entertainment =

South Korean animation studio

SAMG Entertainment Co., Ltd.
- Native name: 에스에이엠지 엔터테인먼트
- Formerly: SAMG Animation (2000–2021)
- Founded: July 26, 2000; 26 years ago
- Founder: Suhoon Kim
- Website: samg.net

SAMG Entertainment Co., Ltd. (Korean: 에스에이엠지 엔터테인먼트), formerly known as SAMG Animation, is a leading South Korean animation studio and global entertainment company that is responsible for creating and distributing CGI children's animation and media content. Established on July 26, 2000, they co-produce their series either in-house or with international production studios.

In April 2021, SAMG Animation announced their rebranding to SAMG Entertainment.

== Productions ==
- Vroomiz (2010–2016)
- Miniforce (2014–present)
- Power Battle Watch Car (2015–2016)
- Monkart: Legend of Monster Kart (2017–2018)
- Catch! Teenieping (2020–present)
- Metal Cardbot (2023–present)

Animation services and international co-productions

- My Giant Friend (2009–2010; co-production with PMMP and Timoon Animation)
- Monk Little Dog (2009–2010; co-production with Timoon Animation, Kim's Licensing and Millimages)
- Fish 'n' Chips (2011–2012; co-production with Timoon Animation, Hawaii Animation Studio, Cyber Group Studios and Jeunesse TV)
- Sonic Boom (2014–2015; animation services for SEGA, OuiDo! Productions, Lagardère Thématiques and Jeunesse TV)
- Miraculous: Tales of Ladybug & Cat Noir (2015–2024; co-production with Zagtoon, Method Animation (seasons 1–5), Toei Animation (seasons 1–5), Toei Animation Europe S.A.S. (seasons 1–5), SAMG Entertainment (seasons 1–3), SK Broadband (seasons 1–3), De Agostini Editore (seasons 2–5) and Gravity Animation (season 5)
- Zak Storm (2016–2018; co-production with Zagtoon, Method Animation, MNC Animation, SK Broadband, De Agostini Editore, ON Kids & Family and Man of Action)
- Ghostforce (2021–2023; co-production with Zagtoon and Kidsme S.R.L)

== Movies ==
- Miniforce: New Heroes Rise (2016)
- Power Battle Watch Car: Feature Film (2018)
- Miniforce: Deeno the King of Dinosaurs (2020)
- Miniforce: Raid of Hamburger Monsters (2020)
