= Ghostforce =

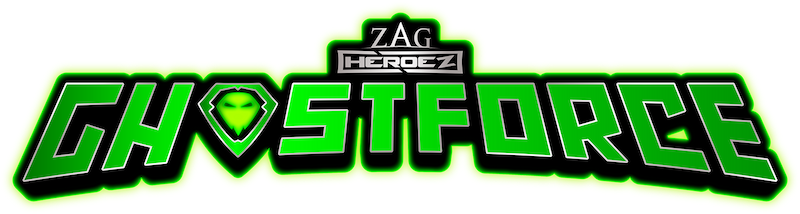
- Genre: Action; Adventure; Horror comedy; Superhero
- Created by: Jeremy Zag
- Developed by: Jeremy Zag; Pascal Boutboul; Sebastien Thibaudeau; Nathanael Bronn
- Directed by: Karim El Mokadddem
- Voices of: Enzo Ratsito; Hervé Grull; Laure Filiu
- Theme music composer: Jeremy Zag
- Composers: Jeremy Zag; Noam Kaniel
- Countries of origin: France; South Korea; Italy
- Original languages: French; English
- No. of seasons: 2
- No. of episodes: 52 + 3 specials + 8 (Bridge)

Production
- Executive producer: Hermeline Vincent Nakache
- Producer: Jeremy Zag
- Editors: Fanny Hermann; Vassin Namar; Romain Furzeau; Thomas Mouton
- Running time: 11 minutes
- Production companies: Method Animation; SAMG Animation; Zagtoon; Kidsme S.R.L

Original release
- Network: TFOU (France); EBS 1 (South Korea, Season 1 only); Disney Channel (Season 1); Netflix (Season 2, Select International Markets)
- Release: 21 August 2021 – present

Ghostforce (also named Ghost Force) is a French independent animated television series created by Jeremy Zag that premiered on TFOU in France on August 21, 2021. The show was initially licensed by The Walt Disney Company for international broadcast, due to the company's ties to Miraculous: Tales of Ladybug & Cat Noir. In the United States, it premiered on Disney XD on October 4, 2021, before premiering on Disney Channel on November 8.

The first season of the series consists of 52 11-minute episodes, 3 22-minute episodes, and an additional order of 8 "bridge episodes" released after the initial first season. A live-action film adaptation is reportedly in development, and is set to be produced by 26th Street Pictures and Cross Creek Pictures, but there have been no updates regarding this project since its announcement.

A second season is currently in production, with the series undergoing a "visual revival", similar to sister show Miraculous: Tales of Ladybug & Cat Noir. This season, undergoing the title "Ghostforce Evolution", will stream exclusively on Netflix in December 2026 in select international markets, with Super RTL and TF1 being secondary broadcasters.

== Premise ==
In New York City, three middle school kids working as a team of superheroes known as the Ghost Force who must protect the city from the ghosts which are invisible to the human eye. These ghosts use fright as fuel to increase their power and ability to affect the world around them. The ghosts have a basic form and a booster form which can be obtained when they merge with specific items. When a ghost is defeated, the Ghostforce use Technoghost containers to contain them. Once the ghost is contained, the damages they did are undone.

== Characters ==
=== Ghostforce ===
- Andrew "Andy" Baker (voiced by Enzo Ratsito in the French version, Jordan Quisno in the English dub) is one of the main protagonists of Ghostforce, he made his first appearance in the episode "Bananice". He is a student in Professor Pascal's class at NYC school in Manhattan, New York, despite being the oldest of the trio, suggesting he was held back a year. Although he is an incredible and talented aspiring basketball player, he is often a lazy underachiever for study. Using the power of his Ectocap, Andy transforms into the superhero Fury the Leader, gaining slime-based powers to stop the paranormal ghosts that terrorize the city.
  - Dragoyle is a dragon/gargoyle-like ghost who resides in Fury's Boo Cap.
- Michael "Mike" Collins Jr. (voiced by Hervé Grull in the French version, Ogie Banks in the English dub) is one of the main protagonists of Ghostforce, he made his debut in the episode "Bananice". He is the youngest student of Professor Pascal's class at NYC school in Manhattan, New York, due to him skipping a grade. He has a large interest in science. Using the power of his Ectocap, Mike transforms into the superhero Krush the Defender, gaining the power of ice creation to stop the paranormal ghosts that terrorize the city.
  - Growmax is an ice cube-shaped ghost who resides in Krush's Boo Cap.
- Olivia "Liv" Baker (voiced by Laure Filiu in the French version, Cassandra Lee Morris in the English dub) is one of the main protagonists of Ghostforce, her first appearance is in the episode "Bananice". She is a student in Professor Pascal's class at NYC school in Manhattan, New York and the younger sister by one year of Andy. Liv is too interested in the paranormal study and the ghosts. Using the power of her Ectocap, Liv transforms into the superheroine Myst the Tactician, gaining the power of portal creation to stop the paranormal ghosts that terrorize the city.
  - Octocat is an octopus/cat-like ghost who resides in Myst's Boo Cap.
- Glowboo (voiced by Emmanuel Garijo in the French version, Cedric Williams in the English dub) is the android member of Ghostforce. He made his debut in the episode "Raijin".
- Miss Jones (voiced by Marie Diot in the French version, Tara Sands in the English dub) is a science teacher at the unnamed NYC school, she is shown to make her first appearance in the episode "Bananice". She is the half-ghost mentor of the Ghostforce and the creator of Glowboo.
  - Glups is Miss Jones' pet ghost.

=== Supporting characters ===
- Jay Baker (voiced by Fred Colas in the French version, Nick Hudson Murdoch in the English dub) is the father of Andy and Liv who is a film director and camera operator.
- Melissa Baker (voiced by Marie Diot in the French version) is the mother of Andy and Liv who is a film director.
- Michael Collins Sr. (voiced by Emmanuel Garijo in the French version, Ogie Banks in the English dub) is the father of Mike who is a wealthy basketball player. Although he loves his son, he often encourages him to become a basketball player like him and can often be neglectful because of his business opportunities.
- Professor Pascal (voiced by Fred Colas in the French version, Nick Hudson Murdock in the English dub) is a teacher at the unnamed NYC school who works as a chemistry teacher, a history teacher, and a biology teacher.
  - Asta is Professor Pascal's dog.
- Mr. Boris Vladovsky (voiced by Emmanuel Garijo in the French version, Nick Hudson Murdock in the English dub) is the strict principal of the unnamed NYC school.
- Drake Miller (voiced by Fred Colas in the French version, Cedric Williams in the English dub) is a student at the unnamed NYC school and a professional basketball player who is Andy's rival.
  - Bobby (voiced by Emmanuel Garijo in the French version) is Drake's loyal acquaintance.
- Charlie (voiced by Marie Diot in the French version) is an Asian-American student at the unnamed NYC school who is a fangirl of the Ghostforce, Krush particularly. She is Mike's love interest.
- Jane and Stacy (both voiced by Laure Filiu in the French version) are students at the unnamed NYC school and are also cheerleaders. Although they act as antagonistic mean girls, Jane often hides her special interests from Stacy who can't accept that Jane likes different things.
- Marlo (voiced by Emmanuel Garijo in the French version) is an African-American student at the unnamed NYC school who acts cool. He is Liv's love interest.
- Carla (voiced by Marie Diot in the French version) is a free-spirited and curious student at the unnamed NYC school who is Andy's love interest, and she firstly appeared in the episode "Bananice" as a background character. Carla doesn't really love Andy much, but Carla is still a good friend of his.
- Rajat (voiced by Emmanuel Garijo in the French version) is an Indian-American student at the unnamed NYC school and the most intelligent member of Professor Pascal's class, whose smarts rival those of Mike's.
- Tim Callaghan (voiced by Fred Colas in the French version) is an overly dramatic and confident police lieutenant who often helps citizens in trouble even when ghosts attack.
- Serge Lightman (voiced by Emmanuel Garijo in the French version) is a movie star currently filming the superhero movie the Bakers are producing called Solar-Man where he portrays the lead character.
- Nolan Kasenti (voiced by Fred Colas in the French version, Christopher Corey Smith in the English dub) is a powerful yet mysterious businessman hunting down Miss Jones.

== Series overview ==
Season	Episodes	Originally released		
Season	Episodes	First released	Last released	Network
1	52	August 21, 2021	November 13, 2022	Disney Channel
2	26	2026	2027	Netflix
Specials	3	October 31, 2022	present	Discovery Kids
Bridge	8	October 23, 2023	November 3, 2024	TFOU

== Episodes ==
=== Season 1 (2021–22) ===
No. overall	No. in season	Title	Written by	Storyboard by	Original air date (France)	U.S. air date	Prod. code
1	1	"Bananice"	Pascal Boutboul, Sébastien Thibaudeau & Jeremy Zag	Karim El Mokaddem (head); Maxime Maleo (co-director); Nathanaël Bronn	November 6, 2021	October 4, 2021	101
Andy unknowingly awakens the Level 6 ice-themed ghost Freezofear who merges with a Bananice popsicle turning it into a banana/gorilla-themed ghost called Bananice where it starts freezing everyone.
2	2	"Pharaok"	Sébastien Thibaudeau & Pascal Boutboul	Karim El Mokaddem (head); Aurélie Gomez & Anthony Ferre	August 28, 2021	October 4, 2021	102
When the Mask of Pharases II falls off Mr. Vladovsky's desk, this causes the Level 7 pharaoh-themed ghost Pharaok to be freed where it starts to turn anyone into mummies that obey its every command and can even perform a heat wave attack.
3	3	"Trashotic" "Grordure"	Written by : Philippe Clerc, Matthieu Choquet, Alexandre Manneville & Olivier Serrano; Idea by : Jeremy Zag & Pascal Boutboul	Karim El Mokaddem (head); Maxime Maleo (co-director); Karina Gazizova & Todd Dejong	September 4, 2021	October 5, 2021	103
When a seagull drops a sandwich onto a dumpster, it frees the Level 4 toxic-themed ghost Spong. It merges with a trash can to become trash-themed ghost Trashotic who unleashes a noxious odor on New York City.
4	4	"Mikroo"	Philippe Clerc, Matthieu Choquet & Olivier Serrano	Isabelle Lemaux Piedfert (head); Celine Pottier & Jonathan Bocquet	August 21, 2021	October 5, 2021	104
When Professor Pascal hands Drake a decorative egg, the Level 2 spiky-themed ghost Mikroo is awoken where it starts shrinking anyone that it phases through.
5	5	"Mizuo"	Pascal Boutboul, Jerome Cointre & Michael Delachenal	Isabelle Lemaux Piedfert (head); Florian Guivarch & Gaultier Buiret	November 13, 2021	October 6, 2021	105
Bobby unknowingly releases the water-themed ghost Droplet from a metal flask. It possesses a water tank to become the water tank-themed ghost Mizuo whose water attacks turn water tanks into clones of it.
6	6	"Sharkoak" "Requinox"	Pascal Boutboul & Pierre Corde	Isabelle Lemaux Piedfert (head); Jonathan Bocquet & Anthony Ferre	September 18, 2021	October 6, 2021	106
Mario's attempt to unlock Liv's locker with a shark tooth releases the Level 7 gluttonous ghost Sharkoak, a shark-themed ghost whose foul smell is polluting the surrounding air.
7	7	"Mastaar"	Pascal Boutboul & Simon Lecocq	Isabelle Lemaux Piedfert (head); Aurélie Gomez	September 11, 2021	October 7, 2021	107
When Drake Miller plays the ukelele under a tree, he awakens the Level 7 spiky-themed ghost Maastar who can create an electric guitar that hypnotizes anyone into loving its music.
8	8	"Arakgum"	Pascal Boutboul, Jeremy Zag & Alice Gioroan	Joan Gouviac	October 30, 2021	October 7, 2021	108
When Mike crashes into a book tray, one of the books releases the Level 5 spider-themed ghost Arak. When it possesses some gum, it becomes gum/spider-themed Arakgum who produces a gummy substance that traps anyone.
9	9	"Zipzap"	Philppe Clerc, Alexandre Manneville, Olivier Serrano & Sébastien Thibaudeau	Isabelle Lemaux Piedfert (head); Aurélie Gomez & Anthony Ferre	October 9, 2021	October 8, 2021	109
A park cleaner bumps into a woman and accidentally drops an old television containing the Level 4 hypno-electric ghost Zipzap. In its electric eel-like form, Zipzap uses people's phone screens to hypnotize them.
10	10	"Artiflame" "Artiflamme"	Pascal Boutboul, Baptiste Renaro & Julien Gallet	Xu Zheping	October 2, 2021	October 8, 2021	110
After Andy sets off some fireworks that hit some coals, the Level 4 dragon-like ghost Flame is awakened. When it merges with a firecracker, it becomes the Chinese dragon-themed Artiflame who can create small-sized explosions.
11	11	"Xhypno"	Pascal Boutboul & Manuel Meyre	Joan Gouviac	November 20, 2021	October 11, 2021	111
When the assistant director trips on a crystal leaf ornament, it awakens the Level 9 crystal-themed ghost Xhypno whose butterfly-like form can hypnotize anyone.
12	12	"Sporofungus"	Pascal Boutboul, Serge De Poucques & Catherine Olaya	Yoan Parent (head); Iman Kaguirova	September 25, 2021	October 11, 2021	112
When a plumber tries too hard to fix a broken pipe, he awakens the Level 4 mushroom-themed ghost Sporofungus from the mushroom food can it was dormant in. Once awoken, Sporofungus starts spreading its foul smell around New York City.
13	13	"Krik-Krok"	Pascal Boutboul & Anastasia Heinzl	Isabelle Lemaux Piedfert (head); Fabien Brandily & Aurélie Gomez	September 18, 2021	October 12, 2021	114
When Andy and Liv accidentally break Professor Pascal's flower pot, they unleash the Level 4 plant-themed ghost Krik-Krok who can create thorny vines on its targets.
14	14	"Burghorror" "Burghorreur"	Catherine Olaya & Serges Depoucques	Yoan Parent (head); Aurélie Gomez	October 16, 2021	October 12, 2021	115
When Andy accidentally drops a mustard bottle, a biker runs over it enough to awaken the Level 4 Spig. Upon merging with a hamburger, it becomes the hamburger-themed ghost Burghorror who can shoot melted goo, burger buns, lettuce, and condiments.
15	15	"Raijin"	Pascal Boutboul, Michael Delachenal & Sébastien Thibaudeau	Yoan Parent (head); Alban Rodriguez	September 4, 2021	October 13, 2021	113
After Mark tries to use an old power generator to power the Baker family's camera, he awakens the Level 6 thundercloud-themed ghost Raijin who causes electrical objects to go haywire.
16	16	"Chronoklok"	Pascal Boutboul & Erwan Witschger	Yoan Parent (head); Iman Kaguirova & Alban Rodriguez	September 11, 2021	October 13, 2021	116
When a teenager drops a spray bottle on a Rubik's cube, it awakens the Level 5 golem-themed ghost Petrifear. Upon merging with a watch, it becomes the watch-themed Chronoklok who can freeze time for one minute.
17	17	"Katastroph"	Pascal Boutboul & Adrien Louiset	Yoan Parent & Alban Rodriguez (head); Jonathan Bocquet & Piere Le Couviour	September 18, 2021	October 14, 2021	119
When a truck runs over a stone and causes a box of vases to fall and break, it awakens the Level 7 cat-themed ghosts Katastroph. They can merge to form a three-headed cat ghost.
18	18	"Jellystery"	Pascal Boutboul & Alec B. Donkitch	Yoan Parent (head); Alban Rodriguez	October 23, 2021	October 14, 2021	117
Looking to imitate Miss Jones' earlier exploits, Liv faces Jellystery alone... But that only makes the situation even worse! Even superheroes have to learn their job first.
19	19	"Vochaos"	Fiona Leibgorin & Guillaume Cochard	Yoan Parent (head); Pierre Le Couviour	November 27, 2021	October 15, 2021	118
20	20	"Agia"	Alice Giordan	Yoan Parent (head); Aurélie Gomez	December 4, 2021	October 15, 2021	120
21	21	"Cyclopee"	Julien Gallet & Baptiste Renard	Yoan Parent (head); Pierre Le Couviour	December 11, 2021	October 18, 2021	121
22	22	"Gmagicard" "Cartomage"	Pascal Boutboul & Olivier Serrano	Yoan Parent & Alban Rodriguez (head); Iman Kaguirova	December 18, 2021	October 18, 2021	122
23	23	"Bubble-Brush" "Frouskimous"	Pierre Corde	Yoan Parent (head); Zoe Simpson	January 23, 2022	October 25, 2021	123
24	24	"Glouglux"	Written by : Pascal Boutboul, Max Maleo, Simon Raynaud & Alexandre Ulman; Adapted by : Pierre Doublier	Yoan Parent (head); Zoe Simpson	January 16, 2022	October 25, 2021	124
25	25	"Scream Scratch" "Gratouille"	Pascal Stervinou	Yoan Parent (head); Alban Rodriguez	February 6, 2022	November 1, 2021	125
26	26	"Creepop" "Cripop"	Valérie Chappellet	Yoan Parent (head); Eddy Moreau	January 9, 2022	November 1, 2021	126
27	27	"Somnibou"	Manuel Meyre	Yoan Parent (head); Iman Kaguirova	January 30, 2022	November 8, 2021	127
28	28	"Troublestretch" "Filaffreux"	Valérie Chappellet	Yoan Parent (head); Pierre Le Couviour & Bérangère Jacquet	February 20, 2022	November 8, 2021	128
29	29	"Meta&Lix" "Méta&Lix"	Sébastien Thibaudeau & Matthieu Choquet	Yoan Parent (head); Eddy Moreau	March 6, 2022	November 15, 2021	129
30	30	"Cookieflame" "Cookieflamme"	Baptiste Renard & Julien Gallet	Yoan Parent (head); Zoe Simpson	February 13, 2022	November 15, 2021	130
31	31	"Graffurious"	Catherine Olaya & Serge Depoucques	Yoan Parent (head); Majorya Sajous	August 28, 2022	March 5, 2022	131
32	32	"Levisfer" "Lévisfer"	Alice Giordan	Yoan Parent (head); Alban Rodriguez	October 2, 2022	March 5, 2022	132
33	33	"Paniclick"	Pascal Stervinou	Yoan Parent (head); Eddy Moreau & Alexis Wemaere	February 27, 2022	March 12, 2022	133
34	34	"Sandyrok" "Sablirok"	Valérie Chappellet	Yoan Parent (head); Zoe Simpson	August 28, 2022	March 12, 2022	134
35	35	"Hypnolion"	Fiona Leibgorin & Guillaume Cochard	Yoan Parent (head); Pierre Le Couviour	September 4, 2022	March 19, 2022	135
36	36	"Jinjoke" "Gredingue"	Pascal Boutboul & Sébastien Thibaudeau	Yoan Parent (head); Eddy Moreau	November 6, 2022	March 19, 2022	136
37	37	"Gumglue"	Pascal Stervinou	Yoan Parent & Jun Violet (head); Majorva Sajous	September 4, 2022	March 26, 2022	137
When Andy and Liv face Gumglue, Mike has to hide their secret identities from their class.
38	38	"Scorpod"	Alexandre Colbert	Jun Violet (head); Zoe Simpson	September 18, 2022	March 26, 2022	138
The Ghostforce struggles to capture Scorpod and reverse it's damage.
39	39	"Turbokorn"	Baptisite Renard & Julien Gallet	Jun Violet (head); Eddy Moreau	September 18, 2022	April 2, 2022	140
The Ghostforce urgently learn how to drive the Ghost Car to stop Turbokorn, a ghost that merged with a racecar.
40	40	"Biballoon"	Pascal Boutboul & Pierre Doublier	Yoan Parent (head); Pierre Le Couviour	November 2, 2022	April 2, 2022	139
When Mike and Andy get jealous of Liv, their teamwork against Biballoon is compromised.
41	41	"Mascarade"	Pascal Boutboul & Alice Giordan	Jun Violet (head); Alexis Wemaere	September 11, 2022	April 9, 2022	141
In facing Mascarade, Mike and Liv are thrown off when Andy tries to change his personality.
42	42	"Batata"	Pascal Boutboul & Alice Giordan	Jun Violet and Yoan Parent (head); Alexis Wemaere	October 30, 2022	April 9, 2022	142
Desperate to prove his bravery, Mike keeps taking risks to fight Batata in the darkness.
43	43	"Prehistorrible" "Préhistorrible"	Pascal Boutboul & Pierre Doublier	Jun Violet (head); Eddy Moreau	October 24, 2022	October 3, 2022	143
Andy takes on Prehistorrible alone, while Liv and Mike are stuck in the ice.
44	44	"Chaorion"	Pascal Boutboul & Alice Giordan	Jun Violet (head); Farah Togora	October 2, 2022	October 3, 2022	144
Ghostforce takes on Chaorion, a spirit from outer space who wants to destroy Earth.
45	45	"Piraniak"	Pascal Boutboul & Pierre Doublier	Eddy Moreau & Alban Rodriguez	October 25, 2022	October 4, 2022	145
46	46	"Dinozos"	Pascal Boutboul & Alice Giordan	Jun Violet (head); Julia Boutboul (remerciements); Alexis Wemaere	October 26, 2022	October 4, 2022	146
47	47	"Dunky Boss"	Pascal Boutboul, Sébastien Thibaudeau & Pierre Doublier	Jun Violet (head); Eddy Moreau	October 27, 2022	October 5, 2022	147
48	48	"Scaregrow" "Epouvanterre"	Sébastien Thibaudeau	Jun Violet (head); Farah Togora	September 25, 2022	October 5, 2022	148
49	49	"Jellyjack" "Gloupsijack"	Pascal Boutboul & Augustin Mas	Jun Violet (head); Alexis Wemaere	November 13, 2022	October 6, 2022	149
50	50	"Kaboom" "Kaboum"	Pascal Boutboul & Augustin Mas	Jun Violet (head); Alexis Wemaere	October 28, 2022	October 6, 2022	150
51	51	"Ninja Ki" "Ninjaki"	Pascal Boutboul & Augustin Mas	Alexis Wemaere & Alban Rodriguez	November 1, 2022	October 7, 2022	151
52	52	"Criangle"	Pascal Boutboul & Augustin Mas	Eddy Moreau & Alban Rodriguez	September 11, 2022	October 7, 2022	152

=== Season 2 (2026–27) ===
No. overall	No. in season	Title	Written by	Storyboard by	Original air date (France)	U.S. air date	Prod. code
53	1	TBA	TBA	TBA	TBA	TBA	TBA

=== Specials (2022–) ===
No.	Title	Written by	Storyboard by	Original air date (France)	U.S. air date	Prod. code
1	"Grump King" "Fichtrouille"	Pascal Boutboul; Pierre Doublier	Anthony Ferre; Pierre Le Couviour; Iman Kiguirova; Aurélie Gomez	October 31, 2022	October 28, 2022	153
Halloween has arrived in New York and everyone is preparing for the spookiest night of the year. Our Heroes and their classmates celebrate the occasion at the Bakers', but Halloween turns into a disaster.
2	"Panikokado"	Pascal Boutboul; Pierre Doublier	Iman Kiguirova; Alexis Wemaere; Aurélie Gomez; Yoan Parent	December 15, 2023	December 2, 2023	154
When Andy, Liv and their parents leave for the mountains to spend the holidays, Mike is happy that he wins the competition at "KassKorp" and finally celebrates the new year with his father.
3	"Origins"	TBA	TBA	TBA	TBA	155

=== Bridge (2023-2024) ===
No.	Title	Written by	Storyboard by	Original air date (France)	U.S. air date	Prod. code
1	"Torteresse"	Alice Giordan	Alexis Wemaere (Supervisor); Berengere Jacquet	October 23, 2023	TBA	TBA
Behind her impregnable shell, Tortress slows down everything in her path and gives the Ghostforce a hard time. To face it, Liv will have to learn that everyone moves at their own pace.
2	"Piktoo"	Augustin Mas	Alexis Wemaere (supervisor); Benoit Phelippeau	October 24, 2023	TBA	TBA
Piktoo collects everything that glitters in his nest above the Empire State Building and deprives part of the Ghostforce of their medallions to dismantle it.
3	"Confiterreur"	Augustin Mas; Pascal Boutboul	Alexis Wemaere (Supervisor); Julie Demogue	October 25, 2023	TBA	TBA
While a ghost turns New Yorkers into giant strawberries, Andy must learn not to do things by halves.
4	"Rozamour"	Alice Giordan	Alexis Wemaere (Supervisor); Berengere Jacquet	October 26, 2023	TBA	TBA
On Valentine's Day, a ghost merges with a rose and drives Charlie crazy in love with Andy, Mike must overcome his jealousy of his best friend to capture the ghost Rozamour.
5	"Froustache"	Augustin Mas	Alexis Wemaere (Supervisor); Maxime Ferlin	October 27, 2024	TBA	TBA
Liv discovers that sometimes you have to choose the lesser of two evils, while Freakking, a Viking ghost, makes New Yorkers shiver.
6	"Boolette"	Augustin Mas; Pascal BoutBoul	Alexis Wemaere (Supervisor); Ludovic Gaudin	October 27, 2023	TBA	TBA
Chaos spread in New York when a ghost makes his victims clumsy. Mike has to take it upon himself to put up with other people's problems.
7	"Cactinétik"	Augustin Mas	Alexis Wemaere (Supervisor); Benoit Phelippeau	October 27, 2024	TBA	TBA
While a ghost, capable of returning what he receives, merges with cactus, Andy understands that sometimes it is necessary to restrain his ardor in order to break a perpetual cycle of attacks and stinging counterattacks.
8	"Flip Floop"	Alice Giordan	Alexis Wemaere (Supervisor); Maxime Ferlin	November 3, 2024	TBA	TBA
Mike and his father exchange their bodies when they meet Swip Swap. In the shoes of his father, Mike apprehends an unsuspected facet of the star's life.

== Home media ==
Shout! Factory Kids signed a deal with ZAG Heroez to secure the North American DVD rights to Ghostforce. Other media companies that will produce home media include Eagle Pictures in Italy, Edel in Germany, and Dazzler Media in the United Kingdom.

== Production ==
The concept of Ghostforce was conceived by Jeremy Zag beginning in 2011. He found inspiration in various media franchises such as Ghostbusters. A pre-visual bible for the series was created in 2012.

Ghostforce underwent several changes during its production. Originally, the series was originally going to be a CGI/live-action hybrid. However, it was later changed to be fully CGI-animated after Zagtoon signed a three-year distribution deal with PGS Entertainment.

Man of Action, who were involved in creating sister show Zak Storm, had some input on the creation of the series. An early animation reel was created in 2014 featuring Andy transforming into a blue Ghostforce member while a demo of the theme song was playing in the background. The reel was featured at the 2014 MIPCOM trade show in Cannes, France.

After some time, Ghostforce was purchased by TF1 in 2016, with Disney later getting rights to international distribution.

Jeremy Zag, before the launch of the series, would occasionally post clips from the series on social media. The first season is animated by SAMG Animation.

Similar to its sister show, Miraculous: Tales of Ladybug & Cat Noir, the second season is going under what the company calls a "visual revival". The season is set to debut December 2026 on Netflix in select international markets with TF1 and Super RTL being secondary broadcasters. It is heavily implied that Disney is no longer involved with the project due to low audience reception.
