= Lee Jihyeon =

South Korean writer and illustrator of children's books

- Born: October 20, 1981 (age 44); Seoul, South Korea
- Occupations: Author, illustrator
- Writing career
- Language: Korean
- Genre: Picture Books
- Notable awards: Amadora BD Prize for Best Foreign Illustrator(2019), IBBY Silent Book Collection(2019), The New York Times Notable Children’s Book(2015)
- Website: jihyeon2.blogspot.com instagram.com/jihyeonlee_picturebook/ facebook.com/seno.jhlee

Lee Jihyeon (이지현; born October 20, 1981) is a South Korean illustrator. Her first original picture book, Pool, won the gold medal at the 2015 Society of Illustrators’ Original Art Show, was an NPR.org Best Book of the Year for 2015, a New York Times Notable Book of the Year for 2015, and one of the best-translated books of the year chosen by the IBBY in Sweden in 2016. Her best-known works include Pool, Door, Strange House, and The Last Island.

== Career ==
Lee Jihyeon's first book, Pool, was published in translation in many countries including the U.S., France, Spain, Italy, and Sweden, won the gold medal at the 2015 Society of Illustrators’ Original Art Show, and was chosen as an NPR.org Best Book of the Year for 2015, a New York Times Notable Book of the Year for 2015, and one of the best-translated books of the year by the IBBY in Sweden in 2016. Door, published in 2017, was exported to the U.S., Italy, and China. It was selected as one of the Most Astonishingly Unconventional Children's Books of 2018 by the School Library Journal (SLJ) of America and as an IBBY Silent Book of 2019. In 2023 she participated in the Brisbane Writers Festival, Australia.

== Awards ==
- 2019 IBBY Silent Book Collection, La porta (Door)
- 2018 The Most Astonishingly Unconventional Children's Books selected by the School Library Journal (SLJ), Door
- 2016 IBBY Sweden's List of Best Translated Books, Pool
- 2015 The New York Times Notable Children's Book of 2015, Pool
- 2015 NPR.org Best Book of the Year, Pool
- 2015 Junior Library Guild Selection, Pool
- 2015 Gold Medal Winner - Society of Illustrators' Original Art Show, Pool

== Works ==
- 2021 The Last Island (Changbi) ISBN 978-8936455651
  - 2023 L’ultima isola (Orecchio Acerbo), Italy, ISBN 979-1255070184
- 2018 Strange House, (Iyagikot Publishing) ISBN 978-8998751326
- 2017 Door (Iyagikot Publishing) ISBN 978-8998751203
  - 2019 神奇的门 (外语教学与研究出版社), China, ISBN 978-7521312157
  - 2018 La porta (Orecchio Acerbo), Italy, ISBN 978-8899064846
  - 2018 Door (Chronicle Books), USA, ISBN 978-1452171425
- 2013 Pool (Iyagikot Publishing) ISBN 978-8998751029
  - 2019 A Piscina (Orfeu Negro), Portugal, ISBN 978-9898868497
  - 2019泳池奇遇 (外语教学与研究出版社), China, ISBN 978-7521312140
  - 2019你們吵吧，我只想靜靜的欣賞 (奧林文化), Taiwan, ISBN 978-9869768221
  - 2016 La piscine (Kaléidoscope), France, ISBN 978-2877678803
  - 2016 Simbassängen (Bokforlaget Mirando), Sweden, ISBN 978-9198330304
  - 2015 Pool (Chronicle Books), USA, ISBN 978-1452142944
  - 2015 La piscina (Orecchio Acerbo), Italy, ISBN 978-8899064075
  - 2014 La piscina (Barbara Fiore Editora), Spain, ISBN 978-84-15208-50-1

=== Collaborations with other authors ===
- 2023 Goodbye, Grandpa, Text by Oh Mi-kyung (Kids-M) ISBN 979-11-5785-629-9
- 2021 Plastic Man, Text by Ahn Soo-min (Kookmin Books) ISBN 978-89-11-12905-8
- 2017 Wall, Text by Park Chae-ran (Ggoomgyo Publishing) ISBN 979-11-85928-14-2
- 2015 Mia in Neverland, Text by Kim Gi-jung (Sigong Junior) ISBN 978-89-527-8094-2
