= Crush (Turkish band) =

Turkish musical group

Crush (stylized as CRUSH) is a seven-member male music group formed in Turkey in 2026. The group emerged from the competition "Idol House Türkiye," which was broadcast on YouTube. The group's members are Arda Soydoğan, Barış Çağan Yüksekkaya, Batu Cengiz, Efe Şan, Miraç Fırat, Milan Önder, and Oğuzhan Çifçi. They debuted on July 31, 2026, with the song "CRUSH!", which shares the group's name. Their record labels are DMC (Doğan Music Company) and ETL Records. On September 11, 2026, they released second single "BENİM OLSANA".
