= JJ White =

American country music group

- Origin: Yuba City, California
- Genres: Country
- Years active: 1989-2003
- Label: Curb
- Past members: Janice White; Jayne White

JJ White was an American country music duo from Yuba City, California composed of sisters Janice and Jayne White. Signed to Curb Records in 1989, the duo charted four singles on the Billboard Hot Country Singles & Tracks chart between 1991 and 1992. Their 1991 debut album, Janice and Jayne, received a B rating from Entertainment Weekly's Alanna Nash. Their second album Scratches on Her Knees was independently produced and released in 1999. Jayne White died in 2003 from cancer.

== Discography ==
=== Albums ===
Title	Album details
Janice & Jayne	Release date: June 18, 1991; Label: Curb Records
Scratches on Her Knees	Release date: 1999; Label: Self-released

=== Singles ===
Year	Single	Peak positions	Album
Year	Single	US Country	Album
1991	"Have a Little Faith"	—	Janice & Jayne
1991	"The Crush"	69	Janice & Jayne
1991	"Heart Break Train"	73	Janice & Jayne
1992	"Jezebel Kane"	63	Janice & Jayne
1992	"One Like That"	64	Non-album single
"—" denotes releases that did not chart
