= IQ (American group) =

American pop and hip hop girl group

- Origin: Lunenburg, Massachusetts, United States
- Genres: Pop, hip-hop, R&B
- Years active: 2005–2008
- Label: Bungalo Records/Universal Music
- Past members: Nyla Williams; Lauren Mafera; Gicelle Valerio; Sadiea Williams
- Website: myspace.com/iqmusic

IQ was an American teen pop/hip hop girl group. The group consisted of sisters Sadiea and Nyla Williams, Gicelle Valerio and Lauren Mafera, all from Lunenburg, Massachusetts. The group split in 2008 to pursue other projects.

== Members ==
- Nyla Williams (born 1990, 35-36 years old) was Miss Massachusetts of the National American Miss Massachusetts Junior Teen beauty pageant of 2005 and 2006. She is also a poet and dancer with aspirations of modeling and fashion designing. Both she and her sister, Sadiea, are of mixed African-American, European, Asian, and Native descent. She was a rapper and vocalist for IQ.
- Gicelle Valerio (born 1989, 35-36 years old) is a Latina member. She is of Bolivian, Dominican, Spanish, and Italian descent. Valerio was a vocalist and rapper for IQ as well as the choreographer. She was accepted to Fitchburg State College to major in nursing and her aspirations is to become a graduate student to major in business as well. Her interests includes fashion, dancing, gymnastics and modeling.
- Sadiea Williams (born 1989, 35-36 years old) was a rapper and vocalist for IQ. She is an athlete who is interested in basketball, cross-country and track & field. She was an all-star basketball player at Lunenburg High School. She has been accepted to an Ivy League School Brown University to pursue basketball.
- Lauren Mafera (born 1989, 35-36 years old) was the main vocalist for the band and replacement for Mikayla Campbell after she quit IQ to work on Broadway. She is a photographer, singer, and dancer. Her interests include drawing, fashion, photography, and singing. Her aspirations are to pursue college with a Business degree and continuing photography.

== History ==
IQ first formulated through a school talent show. Sisters Sadiea and Nyla, asked their father, Mark, to compose songs for their performances. The girls performed the song "School" (a later song on their debut album). The overall response from young people was outstanding. In the group, the Williams sisters and Valerio both rapped and performed back-up singing vocals. Mafera was the main vocalist.

IQ performed in three cities: Boston, New York and Los Angeles to promote the release of their EP, It's Like That, initially released on Apple iTunes in May 2005. On New Year's Eve 2005, they performed at the Radio Disney Jingle Jam in Boston with B5, Everlife and Jada. In 2006, they released a remake of the Frankie Valli & The Four Seasons song "Big Girls Don't Cry" as their first single on the now-defunct Radio Disney

IQ continued to perform shows with Radio Disney and obtained the prestige of becoming Radio Disney's "Incubator" artist. In July 2006, their debut album, Roll Call in July, distributed by WPE Music, LLC through Bungalo/Universal.

In February 2008, the group worked on a sophomore album titled Crush Bungalo Records/Universal Music, but it was left unreleased. The debut single from the unreleased album was "Crush on U" and a remixed version which includes artists such as Mighty Mystic; a Jamaican musician, Baby Boy Da Prince, CL Smooth and J. R. Writer from Dipset.

In 2008, the group split up when all the members went to different colleges.

== Discography ==
- It's Like That EP (2005)
- Roll Call (2006)
- Crush (2008)
