= Miraculous (franchise) =

French superhero media franchise

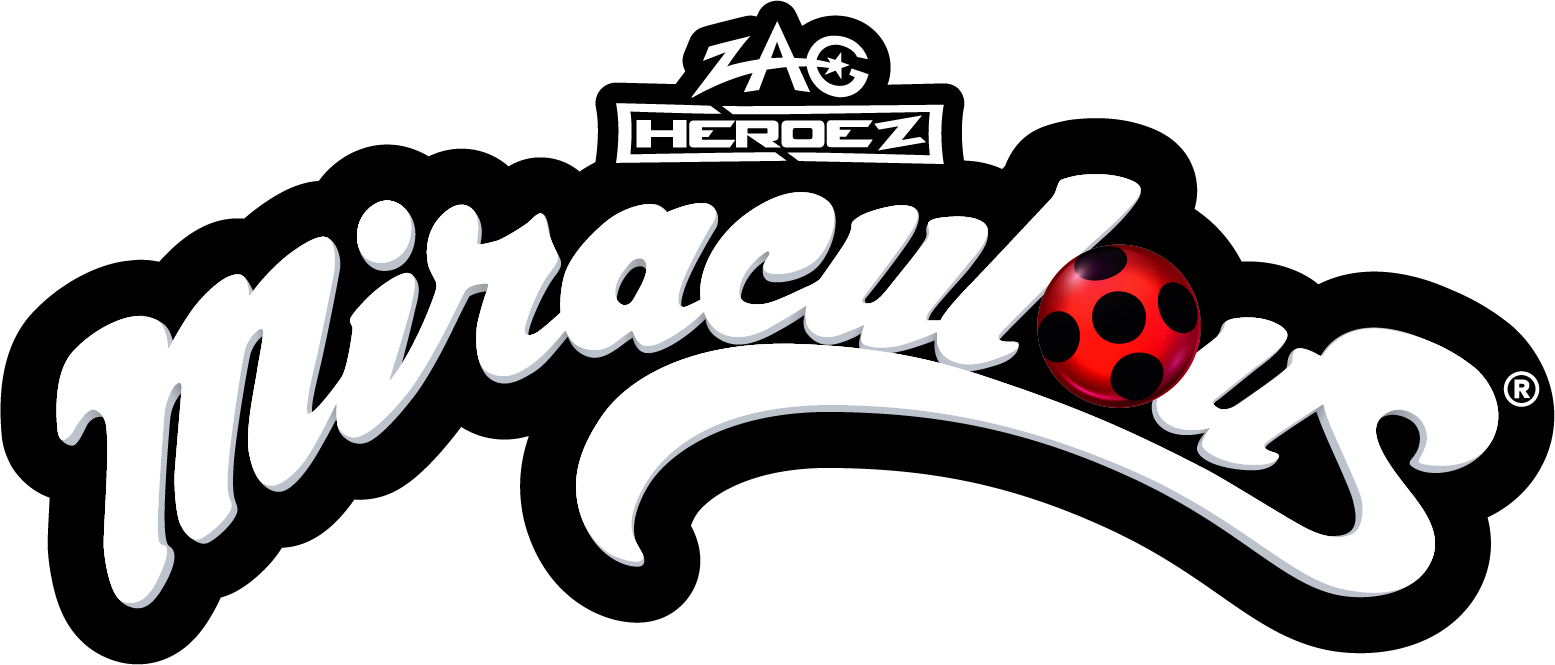
- Official franchise logo
- Created by: Thomas Astruc
- Original work: Miraculous: Tales of Ladybug & Cat Noir (2015–present)
- Owner: Miraculous Corp. (Mediawan/ZAG)
- Years: 2015–present

Print publications
- Book: Book series
- Comics: Comics and manga

Films and television
- Film: Ladybug & Cat Noir: The Movie (2023)
- Web series: Miraculous: Secrets (2015–20); Miraculous: Tales from Paris (2017); Miraculous Chibi (2018–present); Miraculous: Action (2023)
- Animated series: List of television series
- Television film: Miraculous World (2020–present)

Theatrical presentations
- Play: Plays and live performances

Games
- Video games: List of video games

Audio
- Soundtrack: Discography
- Original music: Miraculous Theme

Official website
- www.miraculousladybug.com

Miraculous is a French media franchise created by writer and director Thomas Astruc and owned by Miraculous Corp., a joint venture of Mediawan and ZAG Entertainment. The franchise follows two Parisian teenagers, Marinette Dupain-Cheng and Adrien Agreste, who use magical jewels (two earrings and a ring) known as Miraculous to transform into the superheroes Ladybug and Cat Noir. The powers of these jewels are granted by the Kwamis, ancient magical creatures that personify abstract concepts such as creation, luck, destruction, and curiosity. In addition to the two main heroes, other teenagers in the city also receive their own Miraculous to transform and help protect Paris, this group became known as "The Miraculers." Together, they defend the French capital against attacks by supervillains created from negative emotions, known as akumatized villains.

The franchise began with the main animated series Miraculous: Tales of Ladybug & Cat Noir (2015–present), it consists web series, TV movies, animated films, video games, comic books, stage adaptations, manga editions and an extensive line of merchandising.

== History ==
=== Origins ===
The first drawing in existence of Ladybug by Thomas Astruc.

Representation of Yin and Yang, a philosophical concept that inspired the duality between Ladybug (creation/luck) and Cat Noir (destruction/bad luck).

The original concept for Ladybug emerged around 2005, conceived by French illustrator and screenwriter Thomas Astruc. The idea was born spontaneously, after meeting a co-worker wearing a ladybug-print t-shirt, he began sketching the character's design on a sticky note. Seeing the potential of his creation, Astruc developed new designs—including fictional comic book covers titled The Mini Menace Ladybug—and built an entire universe around the protagonist, inspired by superhero universes like Marvel's. The project gained momentum when he joined forces with Jeremy Zag, producer of ZAGTOON (now ZAG Entertainment), which allowed for further refinement of the concept.

Astruc drew inspiration from various sources, especially Japanese animation and comics, elements of superheroes similar to Spider-Man, and Franco-Belgian comics. The main character was created following the characteristics of the magical girl genre, like Sailor Moon, while the tone and romantic atmosphere of Paris were especially influenced by the character from the French film Amélie Poulain.

Cat Noir was designed as a symbolic counterpart to Ladybug, based on the Chinese philosophical concept of Yin and Yang. Since ladybugs are traditionally associated with good luck, Astruc created a black cat hero representing bad luck and destruction. His look was inspired by the DC Comics character Catwoman, with a black suit, agility, and the ability to act unnoticed. In terms of personality, he symbolizes freedom: in his ordinary life, Adrien is reserved and limited by his father's rules, while as a superhero he becomes playful, fearless, and expressive.

In the early versions of the project, the character was called Félix and had a colder, more distant temperament. During development, in partnership with Jeremy Zag, the concept was reformulated, Adrien Agreste was then created, and the name Félix was kept to create the character's cousin, Félix Fathom. This change made the relationship between the protagonists more empathetic and accessible to the audience. When Nathanaël Bronn presented the project to Jeremy Zag, he immediately fell in love with the idea: a superhero story set in Paris, combining action, adventure, and romance, with universal values capable of appealing to a global audience. To transform the vision into reality, Zag sought out Aton Soumache of Method Animation, and together they decided to develop the production in an international partnership. The goal was to create a European animation that combined the essence of Western comics, the characteristic French touch, and the dynamism of Japanese animation, as Zag explained: "American-style superheroes, with stories and powers in the Japanese format."

When the project began, there were very few superheroines as protagonists—a scenario that would change drastically just five years later. The producers took a risk: with the exception of the Japanese market, almost no one had ventured to create a heroine of this type as the main character. Experience showed that a female protagonist did not alienate the male audience, as long as there was comedy, adventure and action, in addition to memorable male characters like Cat Noir. The main challenge was to also win over the female audience: the team maintained elements that referred to the universe considered "feminine," but added attributes and powers previously reserved for heroes of the genre. The proposal was exactly that: a series made for girls, but that would also win over boys.

This initiative also arose from a change in the profile of female characters in entertainment, before, they were generally represented as fairies or princesses in search of their prince charming. Starting with productions like The Snow Queen, Rapunzel and The Hunger Games, characters with power, autonomy, and the capacity for action began to be shown, and Miraculous came to consolidate this new approach.

As the creator of the character and the mastermind behind the concept, Astruc also assumed the role of writer and director of the series. Initially, he explored various approaches, but many proved difficult to implement, especially due to the number of partners involved. To reconcile all these points, he worked closely with Sébastien Thibaudeau, the script director, who acted as a link between the parties. The pair defended the original essence of the story while making adjustments to meet the needs of the partners, without distorting the initial idea.

One of the biggest challenges during production was finding screenwriters who understood the language and structure of superhero stories. Astruc worked alongside Thibaudeau to guide the team, as many had a tendency to separate comedic moments from action scenes, instead of naturally weaving them into the narrative.

=== Visual style ===
The team included Nathanaël Bronn, responsible for the graphic design of the series. Long known for his previous work with Astruc, he followed the project from its earliest stages. Upon seeing the initial sketches, he immediately recognized the character's potential and helped present them to Jeremy Zag, who showed great interest. Bronn assumed the role of art director and graphic designer, participating in the entire process: defining the visual style of the characters, the settings, the art direction, the color palette, and even the construction of the stories themselves. For him, drawing is, above all, a way of telling stories—and ZAGTOON allowed him to combine these two functions, something relatively rare in the market.

His mission was to create a visual universe that balanced Japanese animation and American comics, without neglecting the French identity. Unlike the standard of muscular and imposing heroes in American comic books, the characters were designed with slender, delicate, and graceful silhouettes, conveying elegance, lightness, and charm—characteristics that directly reference French culture. This approach aligned perfectly with the plot: Marinette dreams of becoming a fashion designer, and Adrien's father works in the fashion world.

The visual design also featured striking color choices: for Ladybug, despite the limited space due to her theme, the combination of red with black dots was maintained as a modern and iconic element. For Cat Noir, the aesthetic was inspired by 1930s design, conveying sophistication, even though he is a character who operates under a mask.

The Kwamis—the small magical creatures that grant powers to the heroes—were inspired by the mascots of 1970s magical girl series, with a touch of Japanese animation.

Overall, the work brings together references from various origins: Bronn's training was influenced by Disney films, Franco-Belgian comics and manga, and these elements merged into a unique and international style. Each tradition contributes in a distinct way: from manga, for example, the magical transformation of the characters was maintained, a feature that does not exist in Western comics.

For the setting, the aim was to unite the traditional image of Paris with the modernity of superheroes, mixing the aesthetics of American comics with the atmosphere of Amélie Poulain. The color palette prioritizes soft, pastel and very luminous tones. The city was represented in an elegant and refined way, simultaneously realistic and with a touch of fantasy, with recognizable landmarks—a technical challenge that required investment but became a trademark of the production.

The inspiration for the Ladybug character came from a combination of references: "Amélie Poulain", "Spider-Man" and "Sailor Moon". From an artistic standpoint, the work represents a balance between Franco-Belgian comics, American comics, and Japanese animation—three styles with very distinct languages, which the team managed to unite harmoniously. The goal was to create a production that reflected the romanticism and beauty of France, presenting attractive superheroines for a female audience, but without resorting to common stereotypes of female characters.

=== Production, premiere and global success ===
In 2010, the project was officially presented at the MIPCOM event in Cannes, France. Production was initially led by the French studios Univergroup Pictures and Onyx Films, in partnership with Method Animation and ZAGTOON. At the time, Aton Soumache, from Onyx Films and Method Animation, stated that the objective was "to create a charismatic superheroine with an authentic European identity, set primarily in Paris." The initial proposal envisioned a stereoscopic 3D animated series, but during development, the team opted to adopt computer-generated animation (CGI) as the definitive format.

Poster for the mock anime Les Aventures de Ladybug et Chat Noir produced by Zag, Method, Toei Animation.

In the summer of 2012, ZAGTOON partnered with Toei Animation Co., Ltd., the Japanese animation studio owned by Toei Company, to co-produce the series—then still provisionally titled Miraculous, previously called Ladybug. The production had a budget of $11.2 million and was described as a comedy-action series set in Paris, following the adventures of a teenage vigilante with superpowers alongside a mysterious black cat. Its visual style, inspired by manga, featured vibrant colors and reminiscent of acclaimed Toei Animation productions like Dragon Ball Z, Digimon, One Piece, and Pretty Cure. The series also had the co-production of Method Animation, by Aton Soumache. At the time, the French channel TF1 had already secured the rights to broadcast the initial season, consisting of 26 half-hour episodes. Jeremy Zag summarized the project with the phrase: "Paris will finally have its superheroes."

Toei had already shown interest in the international market two years prior with the release of the film HeartCatch Pretty Cure!, set in the French capital, and officially joined the project as a co-producer two years later, around that time, Smile Pretty Cure! was currently airing at that time. The studio developed a 2D anime-style test promotional video, known as the Ladybug PV, directed by Kohei Chikokai and with music composed, produced and performed by Noam Kaniel (Noam) who would later compose and produce music on the current series, and was working on Power Rangers Super Samurai at that time. It was initially sent privately on August 26, 2012, but was temporarily made public by mistake on September 5 and 6 of the same year, later being shared by fans. This version featured Félix as the male character—who was later redesigned, giving rise to Adrien Agreste, the user of the Black Cat Miraculous and Plagg as his holder, and his cousin Félix Fathom, the user of the Peacock Miraculous, with Duusu as his holder and was previously the holder of the Dog Miraculous with Barkk as his holder.

Although the result was of high quality, the team encountered technical difficulties—such as the complexity of animating the titular character's spots—and realized that the Japanese style made international sales more difficult. Despite this, the 2D animation design from 2012 was reused in the current series that exists as an animated film in the current universe. Therefore, they decided to maintain the essence of the animation but definitively adopt computer-generated animation (CGI), which offered more flexibility. Furthermore, the series underwent a change in tone: initially darker and aimed at young adults, it was readjusted with the help of script director Sébastien Thibaudeau to become lighter and more accessible to a children's audience.

The first promotional materials in their final format were released later, the first 3D animated video was made available on October 8, 2013, and the second in early February 2014.

On November 21, 2012, an agreement was announced between ZAGTOON, Method Animation, SAMG Animation and SK Broadband, the companies committed to investing a total of $50 million by 2017 for the development of five productions. The first of these was Miraculous, which received an initial investment of $10 million. As part of the contract, SK Broadband secured exclusive rights for on-demand broadcast in South Korea, available to subscribers of its IPTV platform, B TV.

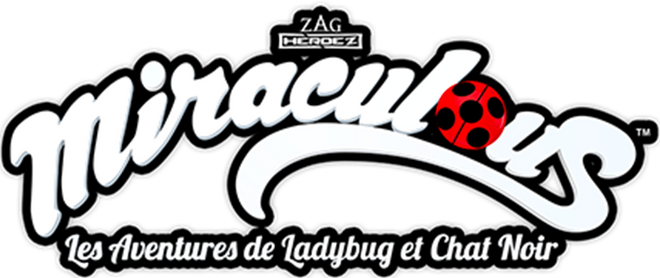
Previous logo of the series featured in the first and fifth seasons.

The series, titled Miraculous: Tales of Ladybug & Cat Noir (in French: Miraculous: Les aventures de Ladybug et Chat Noir), premiered worldwide on September 1, 2015, in South Korea on the educational channel EBS1. Shortly after, on October 19, 2015, it arrived in France on the TF1 channel, through the TFOU children's block. The show quickly achieved global success, being listed among the Top 10 most popular TV shows on Netflix in the United States and achieving record viewership in China. In August 2019, the Brazilian children's channel Gloob, belonging to Globo, established a co-production partnership with ZAG, officially joining the project and contributing to the development of subsequent seasons.

Currently, Miraculous is considered one of the most successful children's intellectual properties in the world. It has six seasons, television specials, and a feature film released in 2023, available in more than 150 countries. The franchise has over 230 global licensees and has already surpassed the $1 billion mark in worldwide retail sales. The seventh season is in production, with a projected release in 2026.

=== Corporate structure ===
Due to the exponential growth of the franchise, producers ZAG and the French independent production company Mediawan joined forces to launch Miraculous Corp. on May 13, 2024. This new label was created to oversee all aspects of ZAG's most successful original intellectual property, Miraculous: Tales of Ladybug & Cat Noir. The new corporation unites all facets of the franchise under one roof, with Mediawan holding 60% ownership and ZAG retaining the remaining 40%. Franchise co-creator and ZAG founder Jeremy Zag will continue as the majority shareholder and board member, overseeing the development and creation of new stories and characters within the franchise.

=== Spin-offs ===
In 2018, Jeremy Zag created the web series ZAG Chibi, a spin-off focused on short slapstick comedy sketches without dialogue, featuring stylized versions (chibi) of the protagonists. Originally produced by ZAGTOON and Method Animation, it premiered on YouTube on August 31, 2018. After a five-year hiatus, the series resumed in 2023 under the new title Miraculous Chibi. Starting with the tenth episode of the first season ("Good Sports"), the production became associated with Miraculous Corp, which also took over the second season of the series, which premiered in November 28, 2025.

== Television ==
Series	Season	Episodes	Originally released	
Series	Season	Episodes	First released	Last released
Miraculous: Tales of Ladybug & Cat Noir (2015–)	1	26	19 October 2015	30 October 2016
Miraculous: Tales of Ladybug & Cat Noir (2015–)	2	26	11 December 2016	18 November 2018
Miraculous: Tales of Ladybug & Cat Noir (2015–)	3	26	14 April 2019	8 December 2019
Miraculous: Tales of Ladybug & Cat Noir (2015–)	4	26	11 April 2021	13 March 2022
Miraculous: Tales of Ladybug & Cat Noir (2015–)	5	27	17 October 2022	1 November 2023
Miraculous: Tales of Ladybug & Cat Noir (2015–)	6	26	23 March 2025	October 11, 2026
Miraculous: Tales of Ladybug & Cat Noir (2015–)	7	26	1 November 2026	TBA
Miraculous Stellar Force	TBA	TBA	2027	TBA
Untitled Miraculous live-action series	TBA	TBA	TBA	TBA

== Films ==
=== Miraculous World ===
Miraculous World is a television film series produced by ZAG (and, starting in 2024, in conjunction with Miraculous Corp.), originally released on September 25, 2020, the series expands the franchise's universe by showing Ladybug and Cat Noir on international missions, where they discover that the Miraculous are not the only source of magical powers in the world, finding new allies, technologies, and ancient jewels.

Occupation	Miraculous World: New York, United Heroez (2020)	Miraculous World: Shanghai, The Legend of Ladydragon (2021)	Miraculous World: Paris, Tales of Shadybug and Claw Noir (2023)	Miraculous World: London, at the Edge of Time (2024)	Miraculous World: Tokyo, Stellar Force (2025)
Director(s)	Thomas Astruc	Thomas Astruc	Thomas Astruc		
Writer(s)	Thomas Astruc; Matthieu Choquet; Mélanie Duval; Fred Lenoir; Sébastien Thibaudeau	Story by : Thomas Astruc & Jeremy Zag; Teleplay by : Thomas Astruc, Matthieu Choquet, Mélanie Duval, Fred Lenoir & Sébastien Thibaudeau	Story by : Thomas Astruc; Teleplay by : Thomas Astruc, Mélanie Duval, Fred Lenoir & Sébastien Thibaudeau	Thomas Astruc, Mélanie Duval, Fred Lenoir, Sébastien Thibaudeau	Thomas Astruc; Sébastien Thibaudeau; Jun Violet
Production company(s)	ZAG Inc. Method Animation	ZAG Inc. Method Animation	ZAG Inc. Method Animation	Miraculous Corp. ZAG Inc. Method Animation	Miraculous Corp. ZAG Inc. Method Animation
Runtime	60 minutes	54 minutes	46 minutes	48 minutes	52 minutes
Released	25 September 2020 (United States); 26 September 2020 (France) (Note: First aired on Disney Channel France. It was also aired on 18 October 2020 on TFOU)	4 April 2021	21 October 2023	5 October 2024	1 November 2025

=== Theatrical films ===
Poster for the animated musical film Ladybug & Cat Noir: The Movie.

The animated musical feature film Ladybug & Cat Noir: The Movie (French title: Miraculous: Le Film) was announced in 2018, with production beginning in 2019. From its conception, it was confirmed that the plot would explore the origins of the franchise and the main characters.

The film had its world premiere on June 11, 2023 at Le Grand Rex in Paris. It is an adaptation of the animated television series of the same name, directed by Jeremy Zag, who also co-wrote the screenplay alongside Bettina Lopez Mendoza. Zag also acted as producer through ZAG, Inc., in co-production with Mediawan Kids & Family, both under The Awakening Production label, in partnership with SND, which was also responsible for distribution.

The official release took place in France on July 5, 2023 by SND. Internationally, the film premiered in theaters in select regions starting on the same date, and was subsequently made available on the Netflix streaming platform in several countries on July 28, 2023.

==== Sequel film ====
On July 3, 2023, during a TikTok interview, Jeremy Zag revealed that the script for the sequel to Miraculous: Le Film had already been completed, stating that the first act of the film would be “even more impactful than the ending of the first”. On June 24, 2024, Zag shared concept art of a new character who will appear in the film on his Instagram account.

On May 13 of the same year, ZAG, in collaboration with Mediawan, launched the joint venture Miraculous Corp., which went on to lead the development and production of projects related to the franchise, including the film sequel. On October 19 of the same year, Andy Yeatman revealed in an interview that the second film will be partially set in Paris.

During the Licensing Con 2024 events, held between August 28 and 29, 2024, promotional materials indicated that the film's release had been postponed to 2027. Subsequently, on March 10, 2025, new information released during ABRIN 2025 pointed to a further postponement, with a projected release date of 2028.

On October 13, 2025, it was revealed that producer John Cohen and screenwriter Matt Roller would join the project, working alongside Jeremy Zag, who also serves as a producer on the sequel.

== Merchandise ==
=== Toys, figures and games ===
==== Bandai era ====
The first partnership between the eponymous animated series and Bandai occurred back in 2015, when the company was named the first global master toy partner. This hugely successful collaboration has given rise to different generations of products over the years. With the series' premiere on December 6, 2015, on Nickelodeon, Bandai announced an ambitious consumer product program. This successful partnership developed in two main eras.

The original launch occurred in 2016, when Bandai formally revealed the first toy line at the US Toy Fair in February. The products officially arrived on global shelves between August and September 2016, including the first 5.5-inch action figures, articulated figures, plush toys, and role-play sets. The global revamp took place between the end of 2020 and 2021, when Bandai launched an updated and expanded line internationally. These new figures, featuring 15 points of articulation and brand-new designs for characters like Queen Bee and Rena Rouge, officially arrived in North American retail stores at Walmart and Target on March 21, 2021.

==== Consolidation with Playmates Toys ====
In January 2020, ZAG formalized an alliance, naming Playmates Toys as its new global master toy partner. The debut line, launched in 2021, focused on 10.5-inch fashion dolls. Starting in 2023, Playmates intensified the development of products based on specific productions. The cinematic line, announced in March 2023, featured the award-winning Marinette Collector doll and the Magic Heroez dolls.

One of the highlights of this phase was the Magic Heroez Transformation Dolls line, officially launched in January 2023. With operational registration beginning on January 13 and wide distribution in networks like Walmart starting in April 2023, the line introduced an innovative mechanism, surprise cylinders containing a 10.5-inch doll coated in a shimmering protective layer. When the figure is submerged in water, the layer dissolves, revealing a secret superhero identity (such as Ladybug, Rena Rouge, Bunnyx and Queen Bee), accompanied by themed accessories and the corresponding Kwami. The success of the concept was recognized by the British Toy and Hobby Association (BTHA), which awarded the line in 2023, encouraging the continuation of new series.

In June 2023, the partnership reached a new level with the launch of the line inspired by the animated film Ladybug & Cat Noir: The Movie. Released in July 2023, the collection included fashion dolls of Ladybug and Cat Noir (10.5 and 11 inches, respectively, with 15 points of articulation), the collectible Marinette at the Grand Ball doll (with tulle and satin details and removable accessories), and the iconic Volkswagen e-Beetle vehicle, a real electric car concept that debuted in the film and as a toy, featuring "butterfly" doors, a functional sunroof, and capacity for two dolls and five Kwamis. At the October 2023 Toy Fair, the 2024 lines inspired by the Miraculous World: Paris special were revealed, including the Lady Ubiquity, Shadybug, and Claw Noir dolls, as well as the Wedding Dreams Gift Set and the expansion of the Magic Heroez line.

In January 2024, Playmates Toys announced the launch of the Miraculous Ladybug Paris Heroez Playset, a 1.2-meter-tall replica of the Eiffel Tower, equipped with a working elevator and zip line. The 2024 portfolio was complemented by the Miraculous Hero Switch doll, which changes clothes at the touch of a button, and the Ubiquity and Cosmobug characters.

On February 27, 2025, in celebration of the franchise's tenth anniversary, Miraculous Corp. (a joint venture between ZAG and Mediawan) and Playmates Toys revealed the commemorative collectible doll. Standing 26.6 centimeters tall, the figure features a sparkly outfit, removable cape, iconic yo-yo, and the ancient grimoire of the guardians. To complete the 2025 celebrations, the line was expanded with the Miraculous Ladybug Shake Surprise set and the Miraculous Box Stack Shack Surprise stackable jewelry box.

==== Strategic partnerships ====
The product program quickly expanded to include several licensing partners: Rubie's (costumes), Accessory Innovations (bags and backpacks), H.E.R. (jewelry and hair accessories), Komar (sleepwear), Handcraft Manufacturing (underwear), and Franco Manufacturing (bed and bath linens).

The franchise has also expanded into tabletop and card games. The collectible card game Throwdown! was released in physical retail stores on August 17, 2016, followed by an online release on October 12, 2016. The board game Miraculous: Chasing Hawk Moth (French: Miraculous: À la poursuite de Papillon), developed by ZAG Educa, was released on February 14, 2018. Designed as a family game for 2 to 4 players aged 5 and up, it features an average playtime of approximately 15 minutes.

In March 2020, the franchise consolidated its position as one of the five most sought-after brands by children in Italy, with a purchase intention exceeding 70%. A key milestone during this period was the appointment of Playmates Toys as the new global Master Toy, with Bandai acting as the official distributor in the Italian market. This European success paved the way for expansion into North America in February 2021, when ZAG and Playmates Toys detailed the launch of the first line of fashion dolls and collectibles designed to mirror the CGI aesthetic of the series.

In March 2021, at a time of strong expansion in the North American market aligned with the announcement that Disney Channel U.S. would acquire seasons four and five, ZAG revealed a robust wave of new licensing partners. Among them, Crayola (coloring and activity books), Fast Forward (backpacks and lunchboxes), Kid Designs (electronics), Komar Kids (sleepwear), Peachtree Playthings (crafts), Galerie (chocolates and sweets), Inkology (stationery), Trends International (posters and stickers), Card.com (bank cards), Mighty Mojo Toys (party supplies), and All About Vibe (sublimated pillows) stood out.

In 2022, ZAG formalized a strategic partnership with the renowned German brand Playmobil. The agreement was expanded in January 2023 through a collaboration between ZAG Play and the Horst Brandstätter Group, with the agency WildBrain CPLG acting as intermediary. The central objective was the development of a diverse global line, launched in 2024, that adapted Ladybug, Cat Noir, allies, and villains to the iconic Playmobil aesthetic. The collection focuses on detailed scenarios that recreate Parisian environments and popular scenes from the series, promoting creativity through the German brand's unique play principle.

Additionally, in 2022, the collaboration with UPD expanded the musical experience segment with the official launch, on November 17, 2022, of the UPD Miraculous Ladybug Basic Music Set, composed of a tambourine, flute, and maracas.

In January 2023, ZAG announced the creation of its own toy division, ZAG Play Toy, based in Frankfurt and led by Helena Perheentupa and James Nunziati. The division was established to develop innovative products that connect the narrative of the series to the physical and digital world. The inaugural line included Miraculous Miraball (collectible Kwami plush toys made of memory foam), the Kwami Mon Ami plush line, the Miraculous Secrets collectible card game (with thermochromic technology), and roleplay sets such as the T&S Paris Café Set and the Marinettes' Atelier mini functional sewing machine.

The Miraculous Miraball, produced by Wyncor under the ZAG Play label, was officially launched in 2023. The line began with promotional campaigns and unboxing videos on social media in August 2023, and was extensively distributed through major international retail chains throughout the fall of that year. The product stands out for its 4-in-1 surprise structure, which includes a collectible metallic ornament, a compressed Kwami plush that expands, glitter stickers, and a decorative ribbon. The item's commercial success has fueled its continued presence on store shelves, notably with wide national distribution in chains such as Walmart and Carrefour.

ZAG Store expanded its plush toy collections with the Villain Puppets line (released on 2024), featuring handcrafted replicas of Marinettes dolls (Ladybug, Lady Wifi, and Evillustrator), using materials such as felt and yarn for aesthetic fidelity. In parallel, the Mon Ami Kwami line (released on 2023) and its expansion in 2024 introduced detailed, life-size plush toys of characters such as Tikki, Plagg, Fluff, Mullo, and Barkk.

In September 2024, the newly formed Miraculous Corp. signed a pan-European agreement with the Simba Dickie Group to launch, in the first quarter of 2025, a line of bath products under the Glibbi brand, including Glibbi Slime that transforms water into a viscous substance, bath bombs, and temporary tattoos.

In October 2024, Miraculous Corp. announced an exclusive artistic collaboration with renowned French artist Richard Orlinski. This fusion of pop art and entertainment resulted in two meticulously crafted Ladybug figurines: one in monochromatic red and the other multicolored. A 1.5-meter sculpture was unveiled at the Hotel Plaza Athénée on October 8, 2024, while Plastoy released limited-edition 20.3 cm tall vinyl replicas for collectors.

On November 12, 2025, Miraculous Corp. announced the selection of Jazwares as its new exclusive global main toy partner. The agreement foresees the development of a complete ecosystem of products to accompany the new programmed content, such as the 7th season of the main series, scheduled for 2026, and the spin-off series Miraculous: Stellar Force, which will arrive in 2027. The first line signed by the new partner should be launched in the first half of 2027. By the end of 2025, the franchise had already reached the mark of more than 1.5 billion dollars in global retail sales.

In April 2026, Miraculous Corp. unveiled a new and extensive expansion for 2027. Its definitive entry into the consumer technology sector was formalized through a partnership with Hyundai Technology, which will develop tablets, computer accessories, and headphones under the brand. The lifestyle product line will gain new items with perfumes and scented candles created by the French brand West (of the Signature Scent Group). In the toy segment for 2027, Jazwares will present items from the Miraculous Squishmallows line, as well as new action figures and play sets. The partnership with Kakawow (of the Suplay group) resulted in the Kakawow Phantom Miraculous collectible card collection, with a worldwide launch on May 28, 2026. The set is divided into two versions, the Collector's Edition with 986 official models, including cards with signatures, and the Special Edition, which features rare and exclusive items. This initiative further strengthens the brand's presence in the specialized collectibles market.

In June 2026, Mediawan (through its joint venture Miraculous Corp.), established a strategic partnership with electric vehicle manufacturer BYD Auto. The collaboration began with the release of a special episode of the web series Miraculous Chibi, titled "Watt a Dream Date!", made available worldwide on YouTube on June 2, 2026, the episode featured the BYD Dolphin Mini model (marketed globally as the BYD Dolphin Surf) integrated into the narrative.

Subsequently, on September 21, 2026, the second phase of the partnership was announced, extending to the main series Miraculous: Tales of Ladybug & Cat Noir, this collaboration resulted in the special 3D animated episode titled "Miracle Power", released worldwide on the YouTube platform on September 28 of the same year.

=== Clothing and costumes ===
Playmates Toys has released costume and accessory sets for the main characters. The Ladybug set includes the mask, yo-yo, the Kwami Tikki, earrings, and a color-changing Akuma. The Cat Noir set contains the mask, the (toy) staff, the Kwami Plagg, and the ring. For the complete costume segment, the franchise partnered with Spirit Halloween, which released costumes of characters such as Ladybug, Cat Noir and Rena Rouge.

The American children's clothing brand ImagiKids has developed an extensive line of themed clothing featuring the characters from Miraculous. This line includes girls' shirts, skirts, pajamas, pajama sets, leggings, children's dresses, headbands, zip-up sweatshirts and graphic t-shirt & pants sets.

=== Stationery and interactive publications ===
The official partnership with Bendon Publishing was formalized in 2021, initiating a portfolio expansion executed in distinct phases over a multi-year period. In the initial phase, the first wave of products reached retail in January 2021, focusing on high-turnover formats to consolidate the brand's presence in the US mass market, including the 80-page Jumbo Coloring and Activity Book and the 64-page Tear and Share variants. Due to positive commercial performance, the line incorporated printing technologies and interactive elements between the end of 2021 and 2022, notably the Imagine Ink line of books, which use transparent markers to reveal hidden colors, and the Color & Trace books, which introduced translucent paper for drawing. Starting in 2023, the strategy evolved from individual books to integrated activity sets, positioning the brand in retail gift sections with Stamper Marker Sets, which combine books with character ink stampers, and giant activity pads with stickers.

In addition to Bendon's involvement, the franchise significantly expanded its global reach through specialized collaborations. Crayola developed themed activity and coloring books targeted at the UK market, while Inkology took on the production of creative stationery and activity sets. The personalization and collectibles portfolio was completed by Trends International, responsible for creating collectible posters and stickers for the series. These initiatives, along with the 32-page publications that included games, mazes, and puzzles, solidified fan engagement through playful and creative interactions.

=== Cosmetics and stationery ===
In 2022, the franchise established a strategic alliance with Horizon Group USA to develop an expansive line of craft kits, creative stationery, and beauty activities. The initial collection's release schedule was executed in three phases throughout the year. On February of the same year, the partnership debuted with three main products focused on personalization and aesthetics. The Miraculous Spots On Beauty Makeover Studio established itself as the core kit focused on nail care, including nail polishes, themed nail stickers, and decorative decals. On the same date, the Miraculous Color-Changing Lip Balm Maker was launched, a "Do It Yourself" (DIY) kit composed of clean formulas that allowed children to create their own lip balms that react to the skin's pH. Completing the trio of releases, the Miraculous Fashion Designer Sketchbook introduced a spiral-bound sketchbook focused on fashion, equipped with stencils, double-ended markers, and stickers for creating and customizing the heroes' uniforms.

Simultaneously, the Miraculous Make Your Own Comic Books kit was released on the same date, designed for children aged 6 and up to create their own superhero stories and adventures in Paris. This comic book set included two blank books with comic strip layouts (one hardcover measuring 25x25 cm and another smaller softcover measuring 15x20 cm, both with 16 double-sided pages each), six double-tipped felt-tip pens (brush and fine), four self-inking stamps with phrases and drawings from the animation, three sticker sheets with the heroes and Kwamis, a stencil sheet with speech bubbles and classic comic book graphic elements, as well as a step-by-step illustrated manual that teaches how to sketch the features of the franchise's main characters.

In April 2022, the line moved into the functional accessories segment with the launch of the Miraculous Create Your Own Color-Changing Water Bottle, a customizable water bottle that changes color according to the liquid's temperature, accompanied by stickers and sparkling stones for decoration. The initial collection concluded in October 25, 2022 with the distribution of the Miraculous 1500+ Super Stickers Book, a giant book containing over 1,500 official stickers of heroes, villains and Kwamis.

The official collaboration with Wyncor marked a subsequent evolution in the cosmetics segment and was officially launched on November 28, 2023. Developed under the ZAG Play premium toy division label, the line debuted in global retail through platforms such as Amazon and Target with the launch of the Miraculous 10-in-1 Beauty Pack sets. This collection was designed to expand the brand's presence in functional pretend play toy categories, while maintaining high international standards of cosmetic safety. The initial year-end launch featured themed bags customized with the characters Marinette, Ladybug, and Rena Rouge. Each complete kit included stylized items such as nail polish shaped like the Eiffel Tower, compact eyeshadows, hair chalk, decorative stickers, and compact magic towels. The technological and interactive differentiator of this line was the magical transformation lipsticks, which change color to a vibrant pink shade upon application and contact with the skin, as well as a multicolored spiral lip gloss and collectible pom-pom pendants of the characters.

=== Home, school and accessories ===
The licensed product line has expanded to include everyday items and home decor. For the home, there are reversible children's bedding sets, a Cat Noir-themed coffee mug, and a personalized Marinette keepsake box (Miraculous Sweet Marinette Keepsake Box). In the school and beverage segment, the franchise offers rectangular lunchboxes, children's cups, sports tumblers with lids and straws and microfiber beach towels. ZAG Store has also launched the Marinette bag collection (backpack, shoulder bag, and small purse), in addition to Adrien Agreste School Bag (a reproduction inspired by the series) and macaron-shaped soaps.

In the United States, following the successful debut of the animated series on Nickelodeon in late 2015, ZAG America began signing licensing agreements for mass-market consumer products. The initial licensing program included Accessory Innovations, which was appointed to develop bags, backpacks and luggage, with the first major wave of licensed merchandise scheduled to reach mass-market and specialty retailers in autumn 2016.

Between 2017 and 2020, the franchise's school merchandise expanded alongside its growing popularity and distribution on streaming platforms such as Netflix in the United States. Backpacks, lunch bags and coordinated school accessories became part of the licensed product range. Some retail sets combined backpacks with matching lunch bags, including round designs featuring the series' characters. The range was also distributed through major American retailers, including Walmart and Target. In 2021, ZAG expanded its consumer products licensing program in the United States by appointing new partners, including Fast Forward for children's backpacks and lunch totes. Other agreements covered stationery, activity books, electronics, clothing and accessories.

In January 2022, ZAG signed a global licensing agreement with PMI International for collectibles, stationery and school supplies. The planned product range included plush backpacks, pencil cases, coin purses, keychains, stampers and other character-themed items, with Ladybug and Cat Noir featured in the collection. Among the products released during this period were a 12-inch three-dimensional Ladybug plush backpack manufactured by Fast Forward New York, listed with a January 2022 release date, and a Tikki plush backpack manufactured by PMI International.

The period also saw the marketing of bags inspired by objects from the animated series. These included a pink mini backpack associated with Marinette Dupain-Cheng, featuring a polka-dot design reminiscent of the school bag used by the character in the series.

Between 2023 and 2025, the release of Ladybug & Cat Noir: The Movie (2023) broadened the franchise's visual identity in consumer products, with the film's computer-generated imagery providing an additional visual reference for licensed merchandise. The period also included collaborations aimed at older children and teenagers. In October 2023, for example, Puma announced a second Miraculous collection featuring apparel, footwear and accessories, including a backpack, with designs inspired by the characters and the nighttime atmosphere of Paris. Licensed backpacks from this period included plush constructions, character graphics and decorative finishes, with different models marketed for school and everyday use.

In 2026, the range of school and everyday products continued to include backpacks, lunch bags, stationery, water bottles, cups and other accessories. The official Miraculous online store featured a back-to-school collection with products depicting Ladybug, Cat Noir and other characters, as well as a separate collection of bags and accessories.

=== Jewelry and official replicas ===
ZAG Store specializes in the production and sale of high-quality replicas of the Miraculous, encompassing both the active transformation forms and the camouflage versions used by the wearers in their daily lives. In the ring line, the replicas of Cat Noir's Transformation Ring and Adrien Agreste's Camouflage Ring stand out. The earring collection offers Ladybug's official ladybug earrings, as well as Marinette's Camouflage Earrings (available in stud and clip-on styles) and the camouflage version also used by Adrien.

The necklace and brooch category includes the Rat Necklace in its transformation and camouflage variants, the Dragon Necklaces representing Ryuko's transformation and Kagami or Marinette's camouflage, as well as the Fox Necklace in its camouflage state. In the segment dedicated to antagonists and allies, the Hawk Moth Brooch and variants of the Peacock Brooch are produced, including the charged version and the camouflage used by Felix. For the bracelets and various accessories sector, the line includes the Carapace Transformation and Camouflage Bracelets, the Snake Bracelet in Luka Couffaine's camouflage, and the Viperion transformation version. Other notable items of technical relevance in the collection are the Purple Tigress panjas-style bracelet and the Goat Hair Clip in its camouflage form.

On May 28, 2026, Miraculous Corp. expanded its luxury accessories portfolio by launching a global collaboration with the Reorah Collection brand. Named Miraculous x Reorah, the collection of limited and collectible pieces featured sophisticated jewelry designs inspired by the Parisian setting, the bonds of friendship, and the transformation concepts of the series' heroes. The technical catalog for this collaboration on the manufacturer's official website included a line of pieces with thermochromic technology and functional medallions. Among the products that change color with temperature variation are the Cat Noir Ring and the Ladybug Earrings, which alternate the shades of their surfaces to simulate the activation effect of the powers seen in the animation. In the category of reliquaries and structured medallions, the collection features the Ladybug YoYo Locket necklace, designed in the shape of a reliquary that opens to reveal a purified butterfly, the Ladybug and Cat Noir Couple Necklace, and the Spinning YoYo Lucky Charm Necklace. As a complement, a thematic sub-collection of thin pendant necklaces dedicated to the mystical creatures of the franchise was developed, containing the official models of the Plagg Necklace, Tikki Necklace, and Rena Rouge or Trixx Necklace.

=== Foods ===
In September 2018, ZAG began a strategic collaboration with Ferrero to launch chocolate eggs under the Kinder Surprise brand. One of the collections featured toys with the characters Ladybug, Cat Noir, Alya Césaire, Chloé Bourgeois, and the villain Hawk Moth, as well as a joint figure of the kwamis Tikki and Plagg.

In March 2022, ZAG launched its first global quick-service restaurant promotion with Burger King. The campaign offered six collectible gifts in the King Jr. Meal combo, such as hero masks, Tikki and Plagg light-up figures, and Marinette and Adrien souvenir boxes. In July 2022, Ladybug and Cat Noir were the first licensed characters to appear on Great Value nonfat yogurt smoothies at Walmart (USA), in partnership with Schreiber Foods, the flavors focused on healthy snacks, such as Strawberry/Carrot/Beetroot and Orange/Mango/Carrot. In October 2022, the strategic partnership with Danone in Spain and Portugal covered the Actimel, Font Vella, and Natural Yogurt brands. The products were reformulated to meet the nutritional criteria of the World Health Organization (WHO), combating the excessive consumption of fats and sugars in children.

On October 26, 2022, ZAG and DeAPlaneta Entertainment announced a new European promotion with Ferrero for Kinder Surprise Maxi eggs. The collection highlighted eight characters, including Ladybug, Shadow Moth, Rena Furtive, and Vesperia, as well as heroes from the New York (Astrocat, Cosmobug, and Eagle) and Shanghai (Renren) specials.

In April 2023, Kellogg's launched its first Strawberry Macaron-flavored cereal. The product uses colorful cereal pieces and white marshmallows to represent the Parisian aesthetic of the series. In June 2023, the European collaboration with Fresh Del Monte promoted the consumption of fresh fruit through personalized packaging and contests to win trips to Paris. In the same month, Wells Enterprises launched the first Miraculous water popsicle (facebar) in the US, with strawberry flavor and the shape of Ladybug's yo-yo.

On September 28, 2023, licensing was expanded globally through the SAI Group with the KANDIZ brand. The line included Crunchiz breakfast cereals, sugar-free fortified juices, gummies made with real fruit (Gummiz), and surprise eggs with premium toys. In December of the same year, the line was reinforced with the launch of puffed rice bars in chocolate and strawberry flavors, consolidating the strategy of combining entertainment and nutritious food in sustainable packaging.

In February 2024, the Kung Fu Tea chain launched the themed drinks "Ladybug's Spots On Lemonade" and "Cat Noir's Cocoa Cataclysm" in the US, accompanied by a collection of six exclusive stickers.

Starting in May 2024, under the new Miraculous Corp. the expansion included flavored waters from "Surprise Drinks" and products from The Ricky Joy Company. In July 2024, the Herfy chain in the Middle East implemented a Happy Meal program with a "Chibi" style and augmented reality experience. In Turkey, the İçim brand launched a line of nutritious milkshakes in strawberry and banana flavors. In Mexico, ICEE launched collectible cups with designs based on the franchise's manga.

On October 8, 2024, in celebration of Children's Month in Brazil, the Bob's chain launched a special campaign through the Bob's Play strategy. The combo includes collectible figurines of four characters (Ladybug, Cat Noir, Tikki, and Plagg) that can be attached to backpacks and accessories. In October 2024, Burger King in France launched a new King Jr. Meal promotion combining Miraculous and Ghostforce, the campaign focuses on sustainability with eco-friendly paper giveaways, including an exclusive Dobble card game, as well as a Kwami hunt inside the restaurants.

In November 2024, SAI GROUP Kandiz will make ready-made frozen and nutritious meals, such as Spaghetti Bolognese and Shepherd's Pie, available in the United Arab Emirates, Saudi Arabia, and the United Kingdom.

On June 27, 2025, Miraculous Corp. and the natural juice producer EKO-SPHERE launched a line of juices in Ukraine. Available exclusively at ATB stores, the 100% natural line features Ladybug and Cat Noir on the packaging of the multi-fruit and grape-apple flavors.

Between September 15 and December 31, 2025, the company I'm The Chef Too! made available the limited edition kit Miraculous Ladybug's YoYo Cocoa Bomb Trio, combining baking with STEM education for families.

For the year 2026, Miraculous Corp announced new strategic partnerships. From May to August, sweetFrog will promote the "Treat Yourself Like a Hero" campaign with the Power Up Raspberry Macaron flavor. Starting in September, Rocky Mountain Chocolate Factory will launch themed caramel apples, and for the holiday season, Crêpe Delicious will offer strawberry and Nutella crepes inspired by the series in the US, Canada, Mexico, and Chile.

== Print publications ==
=== Books ===
As part of the franchise's expansion strategy, ZAG (later its joint venture Miraculous Corp.) partnered with the French publisher Hachette Jeunesse to launch a complete line of literary and entertainment materials dedicated to the series.

The main line of novels was officially launched on June 1, 2016, as part of the traditional La Bibliothèque Rose collection, aimed at children and teenagers aged 8 to 10. Initially consisting of book adaptations of episodes from the animated series Miraculous: Tales of Ladybug & Cat Noir, the collection continues to be published: it reached volume number 54 in November 2024 and continues to receive new releases regularly. In addition to the regular volumes, other lines were created within the same collection: the Miraculous - Nouvelles Histoires series, with original storylines that expand the universe of the plot, which began in April 2025 and already has five volumes as of early 2026, Interactive titles in the “choose your own adventure” format, such as Miraculous – C'est Toi le Héros XXL, from October 2018, and Miraculous – Chat Noir – C'est Toi le Héros XXL, from October 2020; and special editions, such as the Miraculous Collector – L'Intégrale collection, released in October 2024, in addition to the literary versions of the special episodes and the feature film Ladybug & Cat Noir: The Movie.

On April 1, 2026, the partnership was expanded with the launch of the new Miraculous Chibi line, also integrated into the La Bibliothèque Rose collection. The series, adapted by Catherine Kalengula, features short, comedic stories with simplified graphic lines, based on episodes from the eponymous animated web series, aimed at readers aged 6 and up.

=== Magazines ===
Cover of the bimonthly Miraculous #1 magazine, published by Panini France

In partnership with Panini France, three successive publications dedicated to the Miraculous franchise were released. The first was the bimonthly magazine Miraculous, its debut issue hit newsstands on May 10, 2017, accompanied by themed gifts—the first copy included Ladybug's iconic yo-yo, it featured comic stories based on the animated series, puzzles, games and trivia, it ran for two phases, totaling 12 regular issues plus one special edition, and ceased publication on March 1, 2019. Next came Miraculous Magazine, a monthly publication released between May 2019 and January 9, 2020, totaling nine issues. It followed the same format, offering comics, activities, and exclusive gifts with each issue. The third publication was Les aventures de Ladybug & Chat Noir: Miraculous, a bimonthly magazine launched on June 20, 2020, and concluded on December 9, 2022, with 16 issues. It featured comics based on seasons 3 and 4 of the series and the Miraculous World specials, as well as games, fun facts, and various gifts.

Beyond the French market, Panini licensed the franchise for several territories, including Italy, Germany, Russia, United Kingdom, Spain and all of Latin America including Brazil. In these countries, the publisher released sticker albums and collections, illustrated books, comic book editions, and manga-style versions, all adapted to local languages and consumer habits.

Starting in 2023, Blue Ocean France acquired the publishing rights for the official magazines through a strategic partnership with ZAG Entertainment, replacing Panini in the French market. Its first publication, Miraculous – Magazine Officiel, was launched on January 4, 2023, with a quarterly release schedule. The line was expanded with two complementary strands: Miraculous Plus, with editions focused on more detailed content, and special editions outside the regular series. All publications feature comic strips based on the continuity of the animated series—including the 5th season—as well as puzzles, recipes, tips, and exclusive gifts in each issue. Also in partnership with Blue Ocean France, the official Miraculous sticker collection was launched on March 28, 2025, featuring 42 stickers per pack and distributed by France Messagerie.

=== Graphic novel ===
Cover of the first edition of the Miraculous: Les Origines, published by Soleil Productions

The French publisher Soleil Productions published the graphic novel series based on the animated series of same name, which features illustrated retellings of episodes from the animated series, with art by Minte and script adaptation by Jean-Christophe Derrien. The series included volumes focused on the origins of the heroes, such as Les Origines: Tome 1 (released on August 22, 2017) and Les Origines: Tome 2 (released on November 28, 2017), adapting the episodes "Ladybug & Cat Noir" and "Stoneheart," respectively.

In March 2016, the American publisher Action Labs partnered with ZAG Entertainment to launch the official line of comic books and graphic novels of the franchise in the United States market. Titled Miraculous: Tales of Ladybug & Cat Noir, the series consists of adaptations of episodes from the first and second seasons of the animated series, restructured for comic book format by Cheryl Black and Nicole D'Andria. The publication ran continuously from July 6, 2016 to April 8, 2020.

=== Action Labs's comics ===
Cover A of issue 1 in the "Miraculous: Adventures" comic book series

In America, the franchise has an American comic book series based on the animated series, known as Miraculous: Adventures of Ladybug & Cat Noir. Originally, Action Lab Comics planned to publish Miraculous Adventures as part of a series of four monthly comic books containing original stories, along with titles such as Tales of Ladybug and Tales of Cat Noir. However, due to the cancellation of the other three series, Miraculous Adventures became the only known comic book series to contain original stories and not just adaptations of existing episodes.

The series was published by Action Lab Comics in the United States. Production began in 2016, and the first volume was released on July 19, 2017. The series was canceled after the release of five volumes, although eight volumes had initially been planned.

As of 2021, Action Lab Comics lost the publishing rights in the US. In 2022, Mad Cave Studios took over the licensing, announcing plans to publish a new series of graphic novels starting in 2024. Strategically, in the initial development phase of the franchise in 2010, there were already plans for Univergroup to release 10 digital comic books for iPad and iPhone, written by Thomas Astruc.

==== Releases ====
#	Title	Release date
1	"Replay"	July 19, 2017
When Adrien outplays a lacrosse player, Hawk Moth akumatizes him. Becoming Replay, he gains the ability to control time around him. Will Ladybug and Cat Noir be fast enough to defeat him? Or will he stop their heroics once and for all?
2	"The Trash Krakken Part 1 - Silurus"	August 30, 2017
Marinette and her friends are having fun at the beach when an akumatized fisherman, Silurus, crashes their party! Controlling the water and catfish in the Seine, Silurus makes a lot of trouble for Ladybug and Cat Noir. Will they be able to stop him before he takes his revenge out on the citizens of Paris?
3	"The Trash Krakken - Part 2"	September 27, 2017
Ladybug and Cat Noir are in New York, fighting a terrible menace that threatens to destroy the entire city. Alongside the world's greatest superheroes, will they be able to stop the Trash Krakken before it's too late?
4	"The Trash Krakken - Part 3"	December 20, 2017
The final chapter of Ladybug and Cat Noir's New York adventure! Can the superheroes of Paris survive New York City and the Trash Krakken that wants to tear it apart?
5	Issue 5	June 20, 2018
This issue of Miraculous: Adventures of Ladybug and Cat Noir collects four Zag Entertainment webisodes: "Inspiration", "Busy Day", "Homework Essay" and "The Notebook". Join Marinette as she gets inspired by the amazing city of Paris, tries to bake enough macaroons in order to spend time with Adrien, writes an essay about a person who inspires her and helps Rose (along with the rest of her friends) try to feel better after Chloé insults her.
Cancelled releases (Note: Note: This is the list of issues that was cancelled from production.)
6	Issue 6	Cancelled
Ladybug and Cat Noir return to their civilian and superhero lives in Paris. But the aftermath of their fight in New York City with the Trash Krakken continues to effect them as they search for answers. Has the threat really been put to rest or is there something more sinister lurking on the horizon?
7	Issue 7	Cancelled
Marinette and Adrien continue crime fighting and hiding their secret identities as Ladybug and Cat Noir. Up against akumatized villains created by the villainous Hawk Moth, will these two superheroes finally meet their match or save Paris yet again? Find out in their latest Miraculous Adventure!
8	Issue 8	Cancelled
This is the final chapter of the second volume of original stories based on ZAG Entertainment's popular television show! Ladybug and Cat Noir face one of their toughest foes yet. Will they be able to save Paris (and themselves), or is this their final fight?

=== Mad Cave's Papercutz and Maverick labels ===
On June 13, 2023, the new partnership with Mad Cave Studios was officially announced, granting them the license to publish the brand in the United States and other global markets. The graphic novels are released under the publisher's own imprints, Papercutz and Maverick, and are aimed at both children and young adults. The release of the first titles was planned for 2024, with distribution throughout North America. According to ZAG Entertainment, the choice was due to the quality of Mad Cave's stories and illustrations, while the publisher highlighted that the richness of characters, plots, and mythology of the series offers infinite potential for the creation of new adventures.

On May 13 of the same year, Papercutz announced the release of the graphic novel series titled Miraculous Chibi (formerly known as ZAG Chibi). This is an adaptation of the eponymous animated web series, with scripts rewritten specifically for the comic book format by Josh Trujillo and Carrie Harris, and illustrations by Lex Hobson and Ryan Jampole, officially released on January 14, 2025. The work brings together both original stories and reinterpretations of previously aired episodes of the animation, maintaining the light, comedic, and relaxed tone of the animated version.

=== Italian publications ===
In Italy, the Miraculous franchise's collaboration with the Italian publisher Panini began on September 15, 2017, with the launch of the official magazine Miraculous: Le Storie di Ladybug e Chat Noir, featuring stories, activities, and exclusive content.

Cover of the first volume of the Miraculous comics in Italy (Panini)

On April 26, 2018, the publisher also launched a line of comic books under the label "Il mio primo fumetto", aimed especially at children from 7 years old. The series was developed by Italian illustrator Giulia Adragna and colorist Fabs Nocera, and concluded its run on August 4, 2022. Comprising 8 volumes of 80 pages each, it chronologically adapts the main story arcs of the animated series, bringing the Miraculous universe closer to beginning readers.

The first volume, "La magia dei Miraculous", focuses on the origins and villains. This was followed by the volumes "Caccia alle farfalle" (October 2018), "Eroi contro il male" (March 2019), "Cataclisma!" (July 2019) and "L'Unione fa la forza!" (October 2020). The collection continued with "Cuori in battagila" (March 2021) and "Super eroi a parigi" (September 2021), concluding with the eighth volume, "Amici e nemici", released on August 4, 2022.

=== Manga ===
Cover of volume 1 of the Miraculous manga, published by Kodansha

In Japan, the franchise received an official manga adaptation, originally titled ミラキュラス レディバグ&シャノワール. In October 2019, Toei Animation acquired the official license from ZAG Entertainment to produce and publish the Japanese version of the work.

Serialization began on January 26, 2021, published by Kodansha in the monthly magazine Monthly Shōnen Sirius, featuring art by Tsuchi Riku and a script and composition by Warita Koma. The first collected volume was released on June 9, 2021; the series totaled three volumes and twenty chapters published in the magazine.

Serialization in Monthly Shōnen Sirius concluded with Chapter 14 in December 2022. In June 2025, following a two-year hiatus, new chapters were released exclusively via the official manga app Palcy.

==== Series 1 ====
#	Title	Adapted episode	Release date	Pages
1	Stormy Weather	"Stormy Weather"	January 26, 2021	61
2	The Bubbler Part One	"The Bubbler"	February 26, 2021	34
3	The Bubbler Part Two	"The Bubbler"	March 26, 2021	28
4	The Evillustrator Part One	"The Evillustrator"	April 26, 2021	28
5	The Evillustrator Part Two	"The Evillustrator"	May 26, 2021	20
6	The Evillustrator Part Three	"The Evillustrator"	June 26, 2021	32
7	Dark Cupid Part One	"Dark Cupid"	July 26, 2021	30
8	Dark Cupid Part Two	"Dark Cupid"	August 26, 2021	27
9	Dark Cupid Part Three	"Dark Cupid"	September 25, 2021	30

==== Series 2 ====
#	Title	Adapted episode	Release date	Pages
1	Stoneheart Part One	"Ladybug & Cat Noir (Origins - Part 1)"	August 25, 2022	26
2	Stoneheart Part Two	"Ladybug & Cat Noir (Origins - Part 1)"	September 25, 2022	26
3	Stoneheart Part Three	"Stoneheart (Origins - Part 2)"	October 26, 2022	24
4	Stoneheart Part Four	"Stoneheart (Origins - Part 2)"	November 26, 2022	24
5	Stoneheart Part Five	"Stoneheart (Origins - Part 2)"	December 26, 2022	23

==== Series 3 ====
#	Title	Adapted episode	Release date	Pages
1	Reflekta Part One	"Reflekta"	June 18, 2025 (first part); June 25, 2025 (second part)	14 (first part); 12 (second part)
2	Reflekta Part Two	"Reflekta"	July 9, 2025 (first part); July 16, 2025 (second part)	12 (first part); 14 (second part)
3	Reflekta Part Three	"Reflekta"	July 23, 2025 (first part); July 30, 2025 (second part)	14 (first part); 12 (second part)

==== Volumes ====
#	Chapters	Title	Adapted episodes	Release date	Pages
1	1-4	Volume 1	"Stormy Weather" "The Bubbler" "The Evillustrator"	June 9, 2021 (Japan); August 1, 2023 (USA)	160 (Japan); 176 (USA)
2	5-9	Volume 2	"The Evillustrator" "Dark Cupid"	January 7, 2022 (Japan); October 3, 2023 (USA)	160 (Japan); 176 (USA)
3	10-14	Volume 3	"Ladybug & Cat Noir (Origins - Part 1)" "Stoneheart (Origins - Part 2)"	June 8, 2023 (Japan); March 19, 2024 (USA)	160 (Japan); 176 (USA)
4	15-17	Volume 4	"Reflekta"	TBA	160 (Japan); 176 (USA)

== Plays and live performances ==
The Miraculous franchise has already featured numerous adaptations for theatre and live musicals around the world. Its journey on stage began in 2016 with a pioneering musical adaptation in South Korea, later expanding to Latin America and Europe, culminating in large-scale productions and global tours.

Year(s)	Title	Type	Country/City	Dates	Observations
2016; 2018	Ladybug	Theatrical musical	South Korea (Seoul)	November 4–27, 2016; January 27–28, 2018 (returned)	The first theatrical adaptation of the Miraculous franchise. A pioneering musical presented in South Korea, with an original story based on the animated series.
2017	Miraculous Ladybug	Theatrical musical	Brazil (Rio de Janeiro; São Paulo)	Rio de Janeiro: June 24–25; July 1–2, 2017; São Paulo: July 8–9; July 22–23, 2017	An official Brazilian production aimed at children and families, featuring songs and choreography inspired by the series.
2019	Miraculous: The Ladybug Show	Musical arena show	Spain (Madrid)	December 2019	A large-scale world premiere, produced by ZAG in partnership with DeAPlaneta, featuring LED screens and acrobatic flight systems.
2020–2023	Miraculous: The Ladybug Show (international tour)	Live show	Europe and Latin America	Variable dates	A touring version of the arena show, presented in various countries, consolidating the franchise's presence on international stages.
2026	Miraculous® Ladybug: O Show Musical	Large-scale theatrical musical	Brazil	Rio de Janeiro: July 9–26; Natal: August 8–9; Fortaleza: August 14–16; Brasília: August 22–23; Goiânia: August 29; Belém: September 5–6; São Paulo: October 3–November 1	Official super production of Miraculous Corp. (a joint venture between Mediawan and ZAG), produced in partnership with Passos na Arte and Touché Entretenimento. Presented by the Ministry of Culture and Brasilprev, with sponsorship from Eurofarma, the production officially adapts the series Miraculous: Tales of Ladybug & Cat Noir' for the stage, using special effects, aerial flights, immersive sets, high-definition projections, and original songs created exclusively for the show. The national tour will visit several Brazilian capitals throughout 2026.
2027	Miraculous Ladybug & Cat Noir: The Live Stage Spectacular	International	World tour	Announced premiere: February 27, 2027, at the Stifel Theatre in St. Louis, United States. Other presentations: March 2027.	An upcoming live stage production developed by Miraculous Corp. in partnership with Canadian production company Monlove. Created by Ella Louise Allaire and Martin Lord Ferguson, the show features an original story and songs, acrobatics, aerial choreography, illusions, dance, puppetry and stage-to-video interaction. The first currently announced performance is scheduled for February 27, 2027, at the Stifel Theatre (in St. Louis, Missouri, United States). And then, the leg of the international tour includes performances in North America, the United Kingdom, Australia and New Zealand.

== Discography ==
The Miraculous franchise features an official discography consisting of soundtrack albums released for television specials and cinematic productions. Music has always played an important role in the identity of the series, particularly in special episodes and in its musical feature film.

The franchise's soundtrack discography began in December 2016 with the Christmas-themed album Miraculous Christmas Album, released by ZAG Records. The album includes songs and musical themes from the series' Christmas special and represents the first official music release within the Miraculous universe.

In 2023, the franchise significantly expanded its musical presence with the release of the animated musical film Ladybug & Cat Noir: The Movie. Two separate albums were released in connection with the film: the Original Soundtrack, featuring the songs performed in the movie, and the Score Album, which consists of the instrumental score. Both albums were released by ZAG, TF1 Musique and Muzeek One.

As of now, no complete official album compiling the instrumental soundtrack of the regular television series has been released, despite the large number of original compositions created throughout its seasons. Additional soundtrack releases may occur as the franchise continues to expand through films, specials, and new formats.

Album name	Year	Type	Record label	Format
Miraculous Christmas Album	22 December 2016	Soundtrack (Christmas special)	ZAG Records	Digital
Ladybug & Cat Noir: The Movie (Original Soundtrack)	30 June 2023	Film soundtrack (animated musical film)	ZAG / TF1 Musique / Muzeek One	CD; Digital
Ladybug & Cat Noir: The Movie (Score Album)	29 March 2024	Film score (instrumental soundtrack)	22Dmusic	Vinyl

== Video games ==
=== Mobile games ===
The Miraculous franchise has developed a diverse lineup of mobile games available for iOS and Android, spanning multiple genres and gameplay mechanics.

Game title	Publisher	Developer	Release date	Platform
Miraculous Ladybug & Cat Noir	TabTale	TabTale	April 25, 2018	iOS, Android
Miraculous Crush: A Ladybug & Cat Noir Match 3	ZAG Entertainment	ZAG Entertainment, WayForward	November 7, 2019	iOS, Android
Miraculous: Color by Numbers	ZAG Entertainment	PSV Studio	February 10, 2021	iOS, Android
Miraculous Puzzle Hero Match 3	ZAG Games	ZAG Games, CrazyLabs	October 10, 2022	iOS, Android
Miraculous Life	ZAG Games	ZAG Games, Budge Studios	Soft launch: December 2022 (Canada); January 9, 2023 (United States and United Kingdom); February 23, 2023 (worldwide release)	iOS, Android

=== Console video games ===
The Miraculous franchise expanded into console and PC gaming with the release of action-adventure titles based on Miraculous: Tales of Ladybug & Cat Noir, featuring original stories set within the series' universe.

Game title	Publisher	Developer	Release date	Platform
Miraculous: Rise of the Sphinx	ZAG (International), GameMill Entertainment	Magic Pockets	October 25, 2022	Xbox One, S, PlayStation 4, PlayStation 5, Nintendo Switch, PC
Miraculous: Paris Under Siege	Miraculous Corp., GameMill Entertainment	Petit Fabrik	October 25, 2024	Xbox One, S, PlayStation 4, PlayStation 5, Nintendo Switch, PC

== Localized entertainment ==
The franchise's expansion beyond the screen has been consolidated through the development of permanent and temporary immersive attractions around the world, operated under the Miraculous Corp.'s localized entertainment division.

On January 20, 2026, Miraculous Corp. formalized a direct strategic partnership with Ground Control Entertainment (also referred to as GC Entertainment) for the development of the world's first family entertainment center entirely inspired by the main series, named Miraculous Adventure. Initially planned for the spring, the opening of the main unit in the prestigious Mall of Qatar shopping center in Doha was set for August 2026, marking the brand's official entry into the Middle Eastern market. Under the management of Andy Yeatman (CEO of Miraculous Corp USA and Global Operations) and Mohamed Mahmoud (CEO and founder of GC Entertainment), the Doha space was designed to merge heroic narratives with physical activities, aimed especially at children aged 4 to 12 and with the capacity to accommodate up to 200 visitors simultaneously. The center is divided into multiple themed zones for creative exploration, including parkour arenas, trampolines, gamified climbing walls, multi-level rope courses, and environments that simulate the charm of the French capital. The complex also features an official franchise merchandise store and a Parisian-style café called Parisian-style Boulangerie Cafe, both accessible to ticket holders and the general public of the shopping mall. Following the consolidation of this main unit in Doha, the direct agreement with Ground Control Entertainment was expanded to plan new facilities in the cities of Jeddah and Mecca, in Saudi Arabia.

Later, on March 12, 2026, the company announced a partnership with interactive experience producer MOIR for the launch of Miraculous Experience: Superhero Training, a traveling technology attraction. Opened on April 3, 2026 at the Paris Marriott Rive Gauche Hotel & Conference Center in Paris, the experience was designed by Andy Yeatman and Kristian Gilroy, focusing on families and children from the age of five. Occupying a total area of 1,400 square meters, the installation is divided into seven interactive themed rooms that utilize advanced visuals and sensors. The narrative puts participants in the role of new recruits in training to assist Ladybug and Cat Noir in protecting Paris against the villain Monochroma, requiring collective decision-making and simulated collaborative challenges on the city's rooftops.

According to Roz Nowicki, Global Director of Consumer Products at Miraculous Corp., location-based entertainment has become an essential aspect of connecting fans to the brand's universe. To support this growth on an international scale and expand beyond the Middle East and Paris, Miraculous Corp. officially broadened the scope of representation of WildBrain CPLG. The agency plans to lead efforts to promote new themed attractions, exhibitions, and experiential formats, operating in a complementary manner to the direct contracts already established by the corporation.

== Awards ==
Year	Award	Category	Nominee	Result
2016	Brazilian Toy Magazine Awards	Best National Toy of 2016	Miraculous	Won
2016	Brazilian Toy Magazine Awards	Best Brand of 2016	Miraculous	Won
2016	Ri Happy Awards	Best Brand of 2016	Miraculous	Won
2016	Latam Expo Licensing Awards	Best Brand of 2016	Miraculous	Won
2017	Brazilian Toy Magazine Awards	Best National Toy 2017	Miraculous	Won
2017	Licencias de Actualidad	Best License of the Year	Miraculous	Won
2017	Licencias de Actualidad	Best Entertainment License	Miraculous	Won
2017	Licencias de Actualidad	Best Promotion	Tosta Rica Ladybug	Won
2017	2017 OVA-ies TV Animation Awards	Best Animated Main Character of 2017	Marinette Dupain-Cheng	Nominated
2017	2017 OVA-ies TV Animation Awards	Best Visuals for an Animated Show of 2017	Miraculous Ladybug	Nominated
2018	Teen Choice Awards	Choice Animated TV Show	Miraculous	Won
2018	The UK Licensing Awards 2018	Best Children's or Tween Licensed Property	Miraculous	Nominated
2018	The UK Licensing Awards 2018	Best Licensed Children's Apparel Range	Miraculous Nightwear for Character.com from Aykroyd and Sons	Nominated
2018	Brazilian Toy Magazine Awards	Best National Toy 2018	Miraculous	Won
2018	Bologna Licensing Trade Fair	Best Property Kids	Miraculous	Won
2018	2018 OVA-ies TV Animation Awards	Best Animation Main Character of 2018	Marinette Dupain-Cheng	Won
2018	2018 OVA-ies TV Animation Awards	Best Animation Supporting Character of 2018	Hawk Moth	Nominated
2019	Bologna Licensing Trade Fair	Special Award Fashion Kids with Miraculous by Guess	Miraculous	Won
2019	Tell-Tale TV Awards	Favourite Animated TV Series	Miraculous	Won
2020	Bologna Licensing Awards	Best Preschool Licensing Project	Capsule Collection Chicco Miraculous	Won
2020	BroadwayWorld Spain Awards	Best Theatrical Event	musical Miraculous: The Ladybug Show	Won
2020	Kids' Choice Awards Mexico	Best Animated Series of the Year	Miraculous	Won
2021	Kid's Choice Awards Brazil	Favorite Cartoon	Miraculous: As Aventuras da Ladybug	Won
2022	Kidscreen Awards 2022	Best Alternative Game (Kids)	Miraculous RP: Quests of Ladybug & Cat Noir	Won
2023	Kidscreen Awards 2023	Best Animated Series (Kids)	Miraculous	Won
2025	Molotov TV Awards	Best Animation		Won
2026	Kidscreen Awards 2026	Best YouTube Channel		Nominated
2026	Kidscreen Awards 2026	Best Holiday or Special Episode		Nominated
2026	Moltov TV Awards	Best Animation	Miraculous	Won
