= Miraculous Chibi =

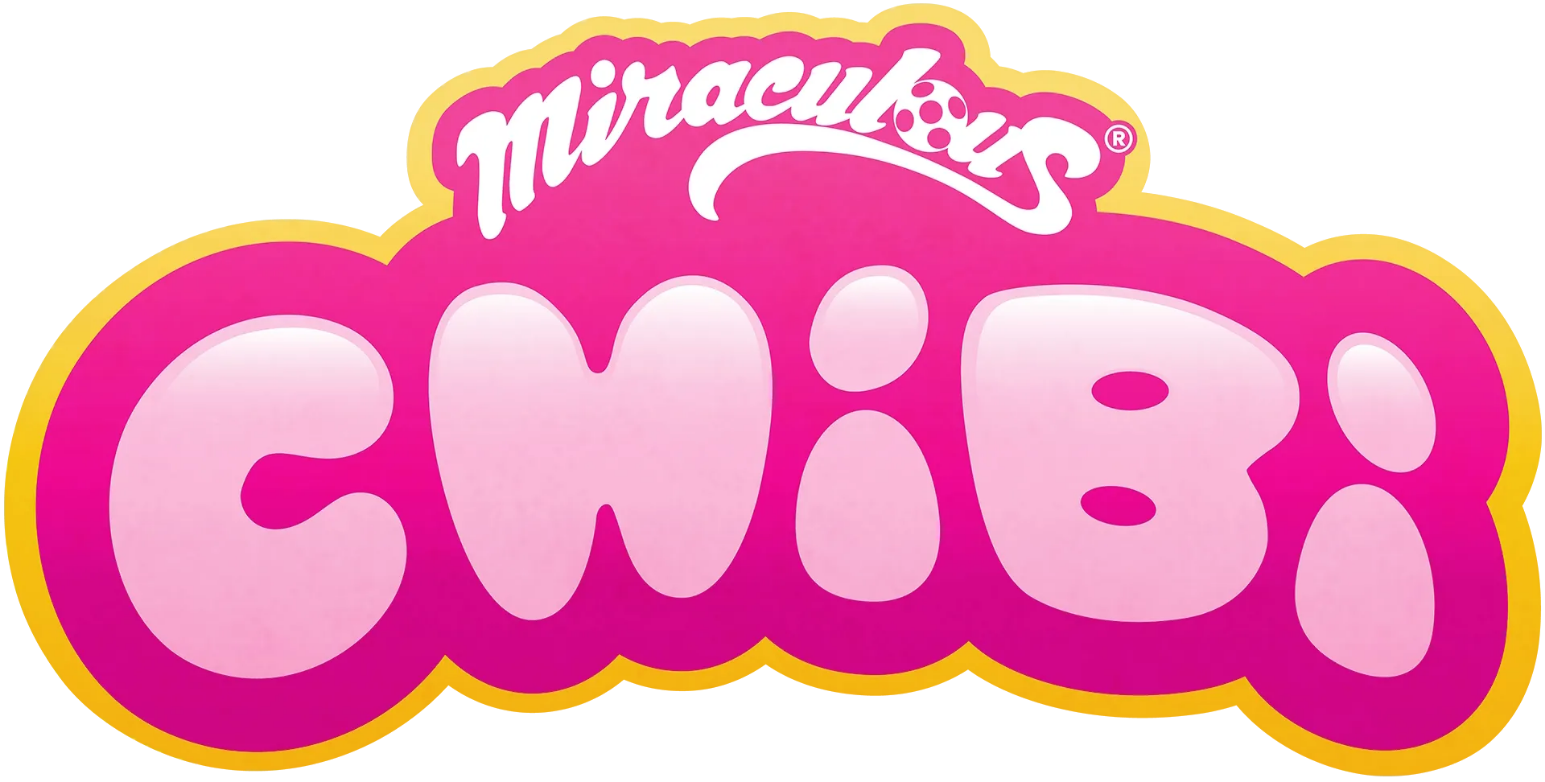
- Also known as: ZAG Chibi
- Genre: Comedy; Slapstick; Action-adventure
- Created by: Jeremy Zag
- Based on: Miraculous: Tales of Ladybug & Cat Noir by Thomas Astruc & Nathanaël Bronn
- Directed by: Jeremy Zag (episodes 1–7); Jean-Baptiste Erramuzpe (episodes 8–9); César Delmas (episode 10); Laury Rovelli (S2-present); Christophe Pittet ("Watt a Dream Date!")
- Voices of: Anouck Hautbois (S1); Benjamin Bollen (S1); Nathalie Bienaimé (S2–present); Louis Lécordier (S2–present)
- Music by: Jeremy Zag; Tanis Chalopin (S1)
- Composers: Jeremy Zag; Noam Kaniel (S2–present)
- Country of origin: France
- Original language: French
- No. of seasons: 2
- No. of episodes: 63

Production
- Producers: Jeremy Zag; Aton Soumache
- Editors: Yassin Namar; Johan Decaix (S2–present); Emeric Montagnese (S2–present)
- Running time: 1–3 minutes
- Production companies: ZAG Entertainment (S1); Mediawan Kids & Family (S1); Miraculous Corp. (S2–present) (Note: The Miraculous Corp. logo first appeared in episode 10 of the first season, "Good Sports". In the second season, in addition to Miraculous Corp., it also features productions such as Disney Channel, TF1, Globo, KIDSME and ZAG Entertainment.)

Original release
- Network: YouTube
- Release: August 31, 2018 – present

Miraculous Chibi, formerly known as ZAG Chibi, is a French animated television series created by Jeremy Zag and a spin-off of Miraculous: Tales of Ladybug & Cat Noir, as part of the Miraculous franchise. The series consists of short comedy sketches in a "slapstick" style, generally without dialogue, featuring stylized (chibi) versions of the main characters.

It is produced by ZAG Entertainment and Mediawan Kids & Family (formerly known as ON Kids & Family) throughout the first phase and up to episode 10 of the first season, from episode 10 ("Good Sports") and officially in the second season, the series is currently being produced by the joint venture Miraculous Corp., it premiered on YouTube on August 31, 2018.

== Synopsis ==
In the first phase of the first season, corresponding to the original period under the title ZAG Chibi (episodes 1 to 7), composed of short, dialogue-free episodes, it follows Ladybug (Marinette Dupain-Cheng) and Cat Noir (Adrien Agreste). Cat Noir tries to win Ladybug's heart in various ways: he prepares a romantic dinner on the rooftops, uses a special perfume, chases after movie tickets, gives her a kitten, and investigates a love letter she wrote—but all his plans end in funny mix-ups. Ladybug doesn't reciprocate, as she loves Adrien without knowing he is Cat Noir. Marinette, in turn, tries to get closer to Adrien: she grows a flower to give him, writes messages, and looks for opportunities to meet, but her shyness turns everything into awkward and funny situations. The episodes take place on rooftops, streets, and gardens of Paris, and in episode 7, a Halloween prank generates another humorous sequence between the duo.

Now with the definitive name Miraculous Chibi (episodes 8 to 10), it follows the same format and style. In episode 8, Climatika appears, altering the weather and causing unexpected winds and rain, creating a light and comical confusion among the heroes. In episode 9, Chloé Bourgeois appears directly, entering into a competition with Marinette to deliver a birthday cake to Adrien, in a race full of mishaps and jokes. In episode 10, the story resumes the partnership of Ladybug and Cat Noir, with a friendly competition in an open environment, always revolving around the secret of their identities and the feelings they cannot reveal.

The second season of Miraculous Chibi follow Ladybug and Cat Noir through a wide variety of iconic Parisian situations and settings, the Eiffel Tower, the Seine River, parks, squares, streets, cinemas, picnics, snowy days, and ice cream parlors. Cat Noir constantly demonstrates his admiration and affection for his partner: he organizes outings, makes surprises, participates in games like ping-pong, faces minor mishaps with animals, insects, and objects, and tries to impress her in every possible way—even if the results are always full of confusion and humor. Ladybug responds with friendship, partnership, and complicity, unaware that, under the hero's mask, is none other than Adrien, the boy she is in love with in her civilian life. The episodes also show Marinette and Adrien in moments of their daily lives: attempts to take photos together, exchanges of glances, situations with diaries, plants, sweets, and small misunderstandings that further fuel their secret feelings.

== Voice cast ==
Voice Actor	Character(s)
Anouck Hautbois (season 1); Nathalie Bienaimé (season 2)	Marinette Dupain-Cheng/Ladybug
Benjamin Bollen (season 1); Louis Lécordier (season 2)	Adrien Agreste/Cat Noir
Marie Chevalot	Aurore Beauréal/Stormy Weather; Chloé Bourgeois
Philippe Roullier	André; Vincent
Gilbert Lévy	Placide I.T. Wang Fu
Nathalie Bienaimé	Majestia

== Production ==
The development of Miraculous Chibi began in 2017, being the first series produced under the ZAG Chibi brand. The project was announced by Jeremy Zag on March 5, 2017, through his social media, accompanied by an illustration created by Angie Nasca, the series' character designer. In the following days, new promotional materials were released, including a three-dimensional model of the chibi version of Ladybug and additional character artwork. On May 17, 2017, an animatic of the episode "Rooftop Dinner" was presented during a live event for the franchise, revealing the visual style and narrative format of the production.

The series was conceived as a collection of shorts set in the Miraculous universe, with episodes approximately one minute long, focusing on physical humor (slapstick) and everyday situations of the characters. Initially, the production of more than 100 episodes was planned. The premiere took place on August 31, 2018, under the title ZAG Chibi, on the official YouTube channel, airing until October 26, 2018, with a total of seven webisodes released during that period. After the release of the Scarybug episode, the original production was interrupted.

On September 22, 2023, five years after its initial airing, it was reported that the web series would resume with two new webisodes. On November 17, 2023, the return was officially confirmed with the release of previews on social media, launched the following day on digital platforms. During this resumption phase, the series underwent a reformulation and rebranding process, abandoning the original title and officially adopting the name Miraculous Chibi. The change reflected the consolidation of the main brand as the franchise's identity.

In addition to the title change, the revival introduced several changes to the production. The animation was taken over by the French studio 2 Minutes, replacing Digital eMation. The narrative format was expanded to include both the civilian and heroic identities of the characters, as well as the introduction of akumatized villains and an updated opening and credits sequence.

On May 13, 2024, ZAG Entertainment and Mediawan announced the creation of Miraculous Corp., a joint venture responsible for managing the franchise. Starting with the episode "Good Sports," released on July 17, 2024, the series' production became associated with the new label. On October 19, 2024, during the MIPJunior event, it was announced that the series would receive a full season consisting of 52 episodes.

In May 2025, details about the new phase of production were released, highlighting the series' success on digital platforms, where it accumulated over 650 million views and surpassed 930,000 subscribers on YouTube. Under the executive leadership of Andy Yeatman and Heath Kenny, the series was acquired by Disney Branded Television for global broadcast and by TF1 in France. On November 25, 2025, new information about the second season was released, including a synopsis and teaser trailer. New webisodes were released on November 28, 2025, integrated into the Miraculous Roblox Tower Defense game and on the official channel, with a television premiere confirmed for 2026.

== Episodes ==
=== Series overview ===
Series	Episodes	Originally released	
Series	Episodes	First released	Last released
1	10	31 August 2018	17 July 2024
2	53	28 November 2025	1 September 2026

=== Season 1 (2018; 2023–24) ===
No. overall	No. in season	English title (web title / title card) French title	Directed by	Storyboard by	Original release date (France)	English release date (U.S.)
ZAG Chibi (First phase)
1	1	"Rooftop Dinner" "Un dîner de haut vol"	Jeremy Zag	Jean-Louis Vandestoc	31 August 2018	31 August 2018
When Cat Noir finds Ladybug on the roofs of Paris, he decides to set up a romantic dinner for her that soon turns out to be... unforgettable! Bon appétit!
2	2	"Catnip Fragrance" "Parfum Corsé"	Jeremy Zag	Valentin Lucas	31 August 2018	31 August 2018
Cat Noir tries to seduce Ladybug by putting on some irresistible new perfume. He soon starts winning hearts... but not the one he was hoping for!
3	3	"The Chase" "Chat perché"	Jeremy Zag	Valentin Lucas	31 August 2018	31 August 2018
Cat Noir decides to ask Ladybug to the movies. But if he wants the superheroine to go with him, he'll need to catch the tickets first, as they just slipped out of his hand and are now flying away in the Paris sky...
4	4	"Curiosity Kick the Cat" "Cher inconnu"	Jeremy Zag	Amanda Sun	31 August 2018	31 August 2018
Cat Noir finds out that Ladybug has written a love letter for her crush. He tries to get ahold of it to discover the mysterious stranger's identity, but soon learns the hard way that curiosity and cats do not mix.
5	5	"Cutest Cat Fight" "Chat Maillerie"	Jeremy Zag	Valentin Lucas	7 September 2018	7 September 2018
Cat Noir decides to get Ladybug a kitten, hoping to win the heart of the superheroine. But as it turns out the kitten he's set his sights on is not very cooperative.
6	6	"Fatal Posy" "Fleur fatale"	Jeremy Zag	Valentin Lucas	7 September 2018	7 September 2018
Wanting to give Adrien a present, Ladybug grows a special flower for him. But she does not realize that the plant is actually a carnivorous one... and that it's hungry! Cat Noir rushes to the rescue!
7	7	"Scarybug" "Ladybouh"	Jeremy Zag	Valentin Lucas	26 October 2018	26 October 2018
It's Halloween in Paris, and Cat Noir is determined to scare Ladybug. But the superheroine has not said her last word!: This is a Halloween special webisode.
Miraculous Chibi
8	8	"Panic at the Park" "Panique au Parc"	Jean-Baptiste Erramuzpe	Written by : Jean-Baptiste Erramuzpe; Storyboarded by : Esther Brustlein	18 November 2023	18 November 2023
Between heroic missions, Ladybug and Cat Noir take a break at the amusement park. Cat Noir takes the opportunity to win Ladybug's heart with a teddy bear. Unfortunately, Stormy Weather has other plans, turning what should be a simple mission into a challenging one!
9	9	"The Cake Race" "La Course au Gâteau"	Jean-Baptiste Erramuzpe	Written by : Jean-Baptiste Erramuzpe; Storyboarded by : Esther Brustlein & Fleur Parraud	18 November 2023	18 November 2023
It's Adrien's birthday! Marinette puts her heart and soul into making a beautiful cake for her secret love, Adrien. But that was without predicting Chloé's arrival with the same splendid cake. A frantic race then begins, leaving us all wondering: Who will be able to deliver the cake to Adrien first?
10	10	"Good Sports"	César Delmas	Written by : Nolwenn Pierre; Storyboarded by : Esther Brustlein	17 July 2024	17 July 2024
Ladybug and Cat Noir face off in a frantic sporting challenge to determine who will be the best superhero.: Note: This is the first piece of media to ever be released under the Miraculous Corp. label.

=== Season 2 (2025–26) ===
No. overall	No. in season	English title (web title / title card) French title	Written by	Storyboard by	Original release date (France)	English release date (U.S. & International)
11	1	"Chamred" "Le perroquet ne répond plus"	Laury Rovelli; Sébastien Thibaudeau	Laury Rovelli	December 24, 2025	November 28, 2025
Marinette transforms an old parrot into a majestic bird to invite Adrien out. But the parrot changes its mind and goes on a picnic with Adrien! Marinette discovers that a magic bow tie acts as a love potion and tries to get it back.
12	2	"Careless Whispurr" "Un chat de trop"	Laury Rovell	Laury Rovell	December 25, 2025	December 5, 2025
Cat Noir is jealous of the attention Ladybug pays to a stray kitten. He tries several schemes to get her attention: acting like a kitten, scaring the kitten, or using sardines. But nothing goes as planned!
13	3	"I Love Paris" "J'aime Paris"	Laury Rovell	Judith Larrede	December 24, 2025	December 12, 2025
Cat Noir invites Ladybug to discover Paris by boat. But a mosquito spoils the trip! Cat Noir battles the insect while Ladybug tries to enjoy the scenery. The situation escalates when Ladybug accidentally pushes Cat Noir into the water.
14	4	"The Christmas Sock" "La Chaussette de Noël"	Nolwenn Pierre	Arthur Cerf	December 24, 2025	December 19, 2025
Marinette is knitting a Christmas sock for Adrien, but a pigeon steals it! The bird flies off with her present on its head. Marinette chases it to its nest and disguises herself as a baby bird. Disgusted, she retrieves her sock and runs away.
15	5	"The Eiffel Tower" "La Tour Eiffel"	Alice Boucherit; Cédric Stephan; Simon Lecoq; Vincent Souchon	Judith Larrede	December 24, 2025	December 23, 2025
Cat Noir and Ladybug are having fun knocking things over with their gadgets. But a can lands on top of the Eiffel Tower! Trying to knock it down, they cause the monument to collapse. They then spend all night rebuilding it.
16	6	"Collector" "La Collection"	Simon Lecocq; Vincent Souchon; Cédric Stéphan; Alice Boucherit	Laury Rovelli; Christophe Pittet	December 24, 2025	December 25, 2025
Marinette searches a trash can for items Adrien threw away, but a rat steals everything! Following it into the sewers, she discovers it also collects Adrien's belongings. They become friends and share their common passion.
17	7	"The Ice Cream" "Chat Noir perd les boules"	Simon Lecoq; Vincent Souchon; Cédric Stephan; Alice Boucherit	Christophe Pittet	December 24, 2025	December 30, 2025
Cat Noir buys two ice creams for Ladybug, hoping to win her over. But things get complicated: a horse eats one scoop, it rolls to the subway, and Cat Noir chases after it everywhere! After a fall and a crazy idea involving a garbage truck, he finally finds Ladybug...
18	8	"Picture Perfect" "La Photo Parfaite"	Léo Bocard; Alice Boucherit; Julien Dinse; Alice Giordan	Louis Musso	March 18, 2026	January 9, 2026
Marinette tries to take the perfect picture of Adrien in the park, but nothing goes as planned! A fly gets in front of the lens, the rain starts to interfere, and even lightning threatens to ruin everything. Will she finally manage to capture the perfect moment with him?
19	9	"The Diary" "Le Journal Intime"	Léo Bocard; Branca Cepelowicz; Julien Dinse; Alice Giordan	Arthur Cerf; Christophe Pittet	March 18, 2026	February 13, 2026
Marinette watches Adrien play the piano and draws a picture of them married in her diary. Adrien notices and greets her. Flustered, she drops her diary, which lands in Adrien's bag. Marinette tries to retrieve it
20	10	"Love Is Blind" "L'amour rend aveugle"	Léo Bocard; Alice Boucherit; Julien Dinse; Alice Giordan	Julien Thompson	March 18, 2026	February 20, 2026
Cat Noir finds some amazing glasses and wants to show them to Ladybug. But he can't see well with them, which prevents him from helping Ladybug during an attack. He refuses to take them off despite the problems. Ladybug completes her mission on her own and ends up breaking them.
21	11	"The Plant" "La Plante"	Léo Bocard; Alice Boucherit; Julien Dinse; Alice Giordan	Fabrice Hagmann	March 18, 2026	February 27, 2026
Adrien entrusts his plant to Marinette before leaving for vacation. But disaster strikes! She places it in direct sunlight and it catches fire. Despite all her efforts, the plant dies and even falls into the street. Marinette has only one solution left: a mysterious shop.
22	12	"Too Many Emotions" "Opération Rigolade"	Léo Bocard; Branca Cepelowicz; Julien Dinse; Alice Giordan	Julien Thompson	March 18, 2026	March 6, 2026
For Adrien's birthday, Marinette gives him a macaron. Overwhelmed with emotion, he bursts into tears of joy. Marinette tries to make him laugh with magic tricks, clown acts, and jokes, but nothing works. The tears keep flowing!
23	13	"The Theater" "Le cinéma"	Léo Bocard; Branca Cepelowicz; Julien Dinse; Alice Giordan	Louis Musso	March 18, 2026	March 10, 2026
Marinette arrives at the cinema and discovers that Adrien is there! She wants to sit next to him, but the seats are occupied by an old lady, a timid man, and a horse! Marinette finds ways to free up the seats, but touches the horse instead of Adrien!
24	14	"Ping Pong Game" "Partie de Ping Pong"	Laury Rovelli	Corentin Penloup	March 18, 2026	March 13, 2026
Ladybug challenges Cat Noir to a game of ping pong. He accepts to impress her, but she's much better! Frustrated, Cat Noir hits the ball with all his might and wins, without winning Ladybug's heart. His old rival then challenges him to another match.
25	15	"Purrfectly Cursed" "Maudit Bracelet"	Léo Bocard; Branca Cepelowicz; Julien Dinse; Alice Giordan	Arthur Peltzer	March 18, 2026	March 17, 2026
Cat Noir gives Ladybug a bracelet, but a mummified cat mysteriously appears! Soon, other cats appear and chase them. Ladybug tries to fend them off with her magic yo-yo, but the felines seem hypnotized. Are they really dangerous?
26	16	"Cat Noir vs Marinette" "Partie de Pétanque"	Julien Dinse; Branca Cepelowicz; Simon Lecocq; Cédric Stéphan	Fabrice Hagmann	March 18, 2026	March 20, 2026
Ladybug and Cat Noir face off in a game of pétanque. Ladybug wins every time, which annoys Cat Noir. He decides to cheat to win. But Ladybug keeps winning! Finally, Cat Noir discovers that she was cheating too.
27	17	"The Smile"	Julien Dinse; Branca Cepelowicz; Simon Lecocq Cédric Stéphan	Arthur Peltzer	TBA	March 27, 2026
Adrien is at a photoshoot, but during his lunch break, he ends up with a piece of lettuce stuck in his teeth, compromising his perfect smile in front of the cameras. Marinette, noticing the problem, springs into action to help him remove the residue and restore his confidence.
28	18	"The Macaron"	Julien Dinse; Branca Cepelowicz; Simon Lecocq; Cédric Stéphan	Arthur Peltzer	TBA	March 31, 2026
Marinette is trying to make the perfect macaron. However, she faces the unexpected interference of an intruding pigeon who tries to sabotage her culinary efforts and even steal her creation. After a series of failed attempts, Marinette manages to complete the dessert, but the pigeon returns to cause trouble. The conflict is resolved with the return of Adrien, who enjoys the macaron, bringing a sweet ending to the culinary mishap.
29	19	"Super Heroes"	Julien Dinse; Simon Lecocq; Branca Cepelowicz; Cédric Stéphan	Julien Thompson	TBA	April 3, 2026
Ladybug and Cat Noir are patrolling the streets of Paris when they come across a child reading a superhero comic about Majestia. The heroine Majestia makes a special appearance, saving some birds in a nest, which has a great emotional impact on the heroic duo.
30	20	"The Jambon-Beurre"	Vincent Souchon; Léo Bocard; Alice Giordan; Laury Rovelli	Corentin Penloup	TBA	April 10, 2026
Cat Noir sings off-key, triggering a severe storm and flooding in Paris. Ladybug and Cat Noir find themselves trapped in a small boat amidst the water engulfing the city. While trying to stay safe, they spot a delicious "Jambon-Beurre" sandwich floating by, but an intruding seagull ends up stealing the snack.
31	21	"Snowball Battle"	Vincent Souchon; Léo Bocard; Alice Giordan; Laury Rovelli	Julien Thompson	TBA	April 24, 2026
With the sudden arrival of winter, Ladybug and Cat Noir take advantage of the Paris snow to start a playful competition. What begins as a winter game turns into an intense and hilarious snowball fight.
32	22	"Drawn in the Stars"	Vincent Souchon; Léo Bocard; Alice Giordan; Laury Rovelli	Arthur Peltzer	TBA	April 28, 2026
Cat Noir attempts to win Ladybug's heart using a romantic technique: he gathers bright stars to create a heart-shaped constellation in the Parisian night sky. However, the plan encounters several comical obstacles, from animals interfering with the assembly to the difficulty of keeping the stars in place.
33	23	"The Bodyguard"	Cédric Stéphan; Branca Cepelowicz; Alice Boucherit; Julien Dinse	Arthur Peltzer	TBA	May 1, 2026
Adrien's bodyguard, Placide I.T., is sick in bed, opening an opportunity for Marinette to try and take on the role of protector for Adrien. However, she becomes extremely controlling, preventing Adrien from enjoying everyday things.
34	24	"The Yoyo"	Cédric Stéphan; Branca Cepelowicz; Alice Boucherit; Julien Dinse	Arthur Peltzer	TBA	May 8, 2026
When Cat Noir looked at Ladybug's yo-yo and started playing with it, he accidentally dropped it into the claw machine at the amusement park. Afraid that Ladybug would find out, he drew dots on a regular yo-yo, and then Cat Noir tried to retrieve Ladybug's original yo-yo.
35	25	"The Spider"	Léo Bocard; Vincent Souchon; Alice Giordan; Laury Rovelli	Christophe Pittet	TBA	May 15, 2026
A lightning bolt struck the Eiffel Tower, starting a fire. Ladybug and Cat Noir tried to use a fire extinguisher, but Cat Noir couldn't grab it because of a cute little spider inside.
36	26	"Ice Cream Day"	Cédric Stéphan; Branca Cepelowicz; Alice Boucherit; Julien Dinse	Corentin Penloup	TBA	May 19, 2026
Marinette repeatedly tries to get a chocolate ice cream from André, but every time she gets close, Adrien appears and she ends up getting distracted or suffering a comical accident. Frustrated, she uses a magic hourglass to try to control time and finally get her ice cream, but her attempts continue to result in disastrous situations.
37	27	"Panic at the Picnic"	Cédric Stéphan; Alice Giordan; Alice Boucherit; Vincent Souchon	Arthur Peltzer	TBA	May 22, 2026
Marinette tries to organize a romantic picnic with Adrien, but a series of comical mishaps disrupt her plans.
38	28	"The Challenge"	Cédric Stéphan; Alice Giordan; Alice Boucherit; Vincent Souchon	Fabrice Hagman	TBA	May 26, 2026
Ladybug and Cat Noir engage in a competitive balancing act across the rooftops of Paris. The challenge, which begins with simple books, intensifies as they attempt to stack increasingly larger objects on their heads, facing diverse weather conditions and distractions.
39	29	"Tiny Ghost"	Fanny Courtillot; Simon Lecocq; Léo Bocard; Vincent Souchon	Corentin Penloup	TBA	May 30, 2026
That night at the library, Marinette uses a magic book to summon a small ghost. She wants to use the ghost to scare Adrien and get a hug. However, the plan takes an unexpected turn when the ghost, instead of scaring the boy, ends up befriending him, leading Adrien to hug the little ghost himself.
40	30	"Watt a Dream Date!"	Christophe Pittet	Christophe Pittet	TBA	June 2, 2026
In the playful and colorful world of Miraculous Chibi, Marinette is determined to arrive on time for her date with Adrien thanks to her BYD electric car. But along the way, a series of unexpected mishaps and funny little obstacles turn her journey into a chaotic adventure. Through every twist, turn, and magical moment, the BYD becomes more than just a car — it helps Marinette keep moving forward and brings her one step closer to her perfect dream date.: This episode is a partnership with BYD Auto.
41	31	"The Rose"	Fanny Courtillot; Simon Lecocq; Léo Bocard; Vincent Souchon	Julien Thompson	TBA	June 5, 2026
42	32	"The Portrait"	Fanny Courtillot; Simon Lecocq; Léo Bocard; Vincent Souchon	Arthur Peltzer	TBA	June 9, 2026
43	33	"The Party"	Cédric Stéphan; Vincent Souchon; Alice Boucherit; Alice Giordan	Julien Thompson	TBA	June 16, 2026
44	34	"Kitten in Distress"	Cédric Stéphan; Alice Boucherit; Alice Giordan; Vincent Souchon	Fabrice Hagman	TBA	June 19, 2026
45	35	"The Unlove Potion"	Fanny Courtillot; Simon Lecocq; Léo Bocard; Vincent Souchon	Corentin Penloup	TBA	June 23, 2026
46	36	"The Smell"	Fanny Courtillot; Simon Lecocq; Alice Giordan; Vincent Souchon	Arthur Peltzer	TBA	June 26, 2026
47	37	"The Gift"	Fanny Courtillot; Simon Lecocq; Alice Giordan; Vincent Souchon	Julien Thompson	TBA	June 30, 2026
48	38	"Hiccup!"	Unknown	TBA	July 3, 2026	TBA
49	39	"The Ragdoll"	Unknown	TBA	July 7, 2026	TBA
50	50	"The Label"	Unknown	TBA	July 10, 2026	TBA
51	41	"Latte Art"	Unknown	TBA	July 14, 2026	TBA
52	42	"The Unbreakable Tuna Can"	Unknown	TBA	July 17, 2026	TBA
53	43	"New Hair Cat"	Unknown	TBA	July 21, 2026	TBA
54	44	"Carriage Ride"	Unknown	TBA	July 25, 2026	TBA
55	45	"It Noir"	Unknown	TBA	July 28, 2026	TBA
56	46	"The Camembert"	Unknown	TBA	August 1, 2026	TBA
57	47	"Baking Nightmare"	Unknown	TBA	August 5, 2026	TBA
58	48	"Snow-Adrien"	Unknown	TBA	August 9, 2026	TBA
59	49	"Karaoke Battle"	Unknown	TBA	August 15, 2026	TBA
60	60	"When Adri Met Lady"	Unknown	TBA	August 21, 2026	TBA
61	61	"Messy Dancing"	Unknown	TBA	August 26, 2026	TBA
62	62	"The Bouquet"	Unknown	TBA	August 29, 2026	TBA
63	63	"Meow the Best Cat Win"	TBA	TBA	TBA	September 1, 2026

== Merchandise ==
The stylized aesthetic of Miraculous Chibi has allowed for a wide expansion of the franchise into the consumer goods market, focusing especially on collectibles and decorative items. One of the first milestones occurred in August 2018, when Burger King launched a global promotion with toys based on chibi versions of the characters. In the same year, the manufacturer The Toy Factory launched a line of plush toys with the "big-headed and cute" look, including Ladybug, Cat Noir, Hawk Moth, and the Kwamis Tikki and Plagg.

In August 2023, Playmates Toys reignited the market with the launch of new sets under the ZAG Chibi label, such as the "Chibi Mini Playsets," which include miniature figures and environments based on the series. More recently, in April 2026, Bandai France launched the "Miraculous Chibi Eyes Surprise" line, consisting of figures that change the expression of their eyes (like hearts or stars) when the top of their heads is pressed.

== Print publications ==
=== Graphic novels ===
Cover of volume 1 of the previous title ZAG Chibi, under the Papercutz imprint.

In the United States, Mad Cave Studios published the Miraculous Chibi (formerly known as ZAG Chibi) graphic novel series under the Papercutz imprint. Published since January 14, 2025, the collection contains original stories featuring characters from the web series of the same name. The series also includes adaptations of selected episodes from the web series, rewritten in comic book format by Josh Trujillo and Carrie Harris, with illustrations by Lex Hobson and Ryan Jampole.

Releases

#	Title	Featured stories	Release date
1	"Pizza Pursuit and Other Cat Tales"	"Catnip Fragrance" "Pizza Pursuit" "Scarybug" "Earning My Spots"	January 14, 2025
2	"Curiosity Kicked the Cat and Other Tales"	"Curiosity Kicked the Cat" "Makeover Madness" "Cake Star"	May 27, 2025
3	"Skate Date and Other Lucky Charms"	"Skate Date" "Fatal Posy" "Christmas Rewind" "Cake Caper"	October 21, 2025
4	"Showdowns and Other Sweet Surprises"	"Sandcastle Showdown" "Getting Rid of Rena" "Miraculous Museum" "Cake-Tastrophy"	December 16, 2025
5	"Red Carpet Runaround and Other Tales"	"Red Carpet Runaround" "Bug Week" "Head Over Wheels" "Sunscreen Snafu"	February 24, 2026
6	"The Art of the Reverse Heist and Other Tales"	"The Art of the Reverse Heist" "Herding Cats" "The Real Heroes"	May 12, 2026
7	"Everything’s Coming Up Roses and Other Tales"	"Ladybug’s Top Five"	October 6, 2026
8	"Catastrophic Patrol! and Other Tales"	"No Business"	December 15, 2026

=== Books ===
Cover of volume 1 of the French book Miraculous Chibi, under the La Bibliothèque Rose imprint.

In France, the publisher Hachette Jeunesse, under the prestigious La Bibliothèque Rose collection, launched the book series adapting the Miraculous Chibi webisodes, starting April 1, 2026. The literary adaptations are written by author Catherine Kalengula, transposing the humor and situations of the animation into a children's reading format.

Volumes

#	Title	Adapted webisode	Release date
1	"Mignon vilain chaton" (Cute Naughty Kitten)	"Cutest Cat Fight"	April 1, 2026
2	"Curieux comme un chat" (Curious as a Cat)	"Curiosity Kicked the Cat"	July 8, 2026
