= Miraculous Stellar Force =

- Genre: Superhero; Animesque
- Based on: Miraclulous media franchise and Miraculous: Tales of Ladybug & Cat Noir by Thomas Astruc, and Jeremy Zag and characters from Miraculous World: Tokyo, Stellar Force by Thomas Astruc, Sébastien Thibaudeau and Jun Violet
- Developed by: Miraculous Corp.
- Written by: Thomas Astruc; Sébastien Thibaudeau
- Voices of: Rebecca Wang; Zach Aguilar; Secunda Wood; Lauren Choo; Nick Martineau; Haven Schneider; Darius Johnson; Jennifer Sun Bell; Khoi Dao; Amber Aviles; Ryan Colt Levy; Kate Clarke; Xander Mobus; Keith Silverstein; Sabrina Weisz; Cristina Vee; Faye Mata
- Countries of origin: France; Japan; Italy; Brazil

Production
- Executive producer: Jeremy Zag
- Production companies: Miraculous Corp. TF1; Globo; KidsMe S.r.l.

Original release
- Network: Disney Channel; Disney+

Miraculous Stellar Force is upcoming 2D-animated series developed by Miraculous Corp. as a spinoff to Miraculous: Tales of Ladybug & Cat Noir and its Miraculous World: Tokyo, Stellar Force special released in 2025, as part of the Miraculous media franchise. This series focuses on the Stellar Force, a group of Japanese students who are guardians of the fragmented Stellar Matrix, to protect Tokyo from supervillains created by Moddler. The series is set to release in 2027 on Disney Channel and Disney+.

== Synopsis ==
Set in the Kano Academy in Tokyo, Japan, the series follows 12 Japanese students, who learn that they are guardians of the fragmented Stellar Matrix, an ancient cosmic weapon. Under the leadership of Miki, Yu Lu, and Mayotte, these heroes must overcome personal differences including facing off chaotic friendships to face off galactic villains, such as the revenge-ridden Moddler, and his henchmen, Skinner, and Rigger, who works for the ominous force, The Supreme.

== Production ==
In October 2024, Miraculous Corp. CEO Andy Yeatman revealed at MIPJunior that a spin-off series tentatively called "Miraculous Stellar Force" was in development. It would be produced in 2D animation and was set in Tokyo, Japan.

On June 7, 2025, a Variety article revealed more information about the series. It revealed the show would be set to premiere on Disney+ and Disney Channel in 2027, as well as propose dynamic action, high stakes, kung fu, comedy, and a cast of culturally diverse superheroes. In addition, the official synopsis and poster showing the main characters were revealed.
