= ZAG Entertainment =

French animation production and entertainment company

- Logo used since 2023
- Industry: Animation
- Founded: May 15, 2009; 17 years ago
- Founder: Jeremy Zag
- Headquarters: Paris, France
- Area served: Los Angeles; Montréal; Brussels; Tokyo; Seoul; London; Mexico
- Key people: Jeremy Zag (CEO)
- Products: Television series; films; video games; digital platforms
- Brands: Miraculous: Tales of Ladybug & Cat Noir; Zak Storm; Power Players; Ghostforce
- Divisions: ZAG Animation Studios; ZAG Films; ZAG Digital; ZAG Records
- Subsidiaries: Miraculous Corp. (40%)
- Website: https://www.zag.com/

ZAG Entertainment, also known as Zagtoon, ZAG Heroez or simply ZAG, is a French independent animation production and entertainment company founded on May 15, 2009, by Jeremy Zag, known for producing the popular animated series Miraculous: Tales of Ladybug & Cat Noir.

== History ==
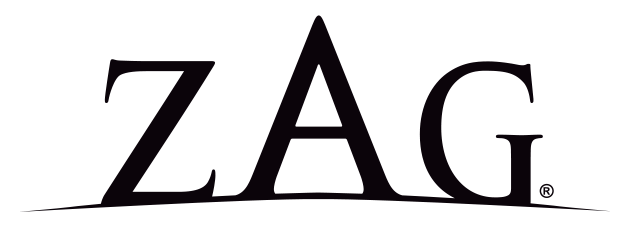
Old ZAG logo (2009-2023).

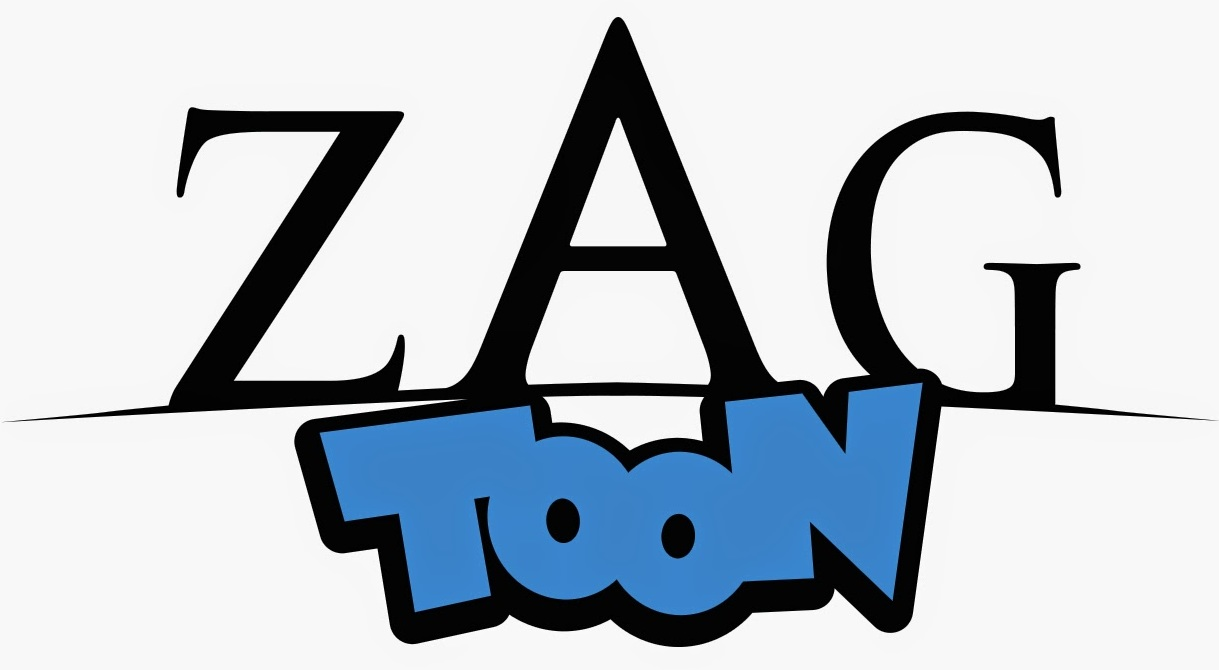
ZAGTOON logo from 2009 to 2023.

French entrepreneur Jeremy Zag founded the Paris-based animation production Zagtoon, a subsidiary of his company Univergroup, in partnership with Jacqueline Tordjman (known as co-founder of SIP Animation, on May 15, 2009.

Zagtoon initially produced 2D animated series such as Rosie (2011–2014), Kobushi (2012) and Sammy & Co (2014), a CGI animated series serves as a spin-off and follow-up for two feature films, A Turtle's Tale: Sammy's Adventures and A Turtle's Tale 2: Sammy's Escape from Paradise.

In 2012, Jeremy Zag expanded ZAG Entertainment to the United States, establishing a studio in Los Angeles. In addition to the United States, ZAG has established offices in other strategic countries such as Tokyo, Brussels, Seoul, and others.

In late-January 2012, ZAG Entertainment under its parent company Univergroup announced that they launched a feature film division dedicated to animated feature films named Zagtoon Pictures and partnered with South Korean animation studio SAMG Animation by merging ZAG Entertainment's division Zagtoon with SAMG Animation to create a joint venture production company named Sam Zag.

In 2015, ZAG produced the CGI-animated series Miraculous: Tales of Ladybug & Cat Noir, created by Thomas Astruc, was first debuted in South Korea on September 1 on EBS1, until it premiered in France on October 19 on TF1 through the children's block TFOU, has become a global phenomenon being shown in more than 150 countries.

On May 16, 2017, ZAG expanded its global retail reach through licensing partnerships for Miraculous, with over 230 licensees worldwide, the company launched waves of products that included dolls, action figures, plush toys, literature, and fashion and lifestyle products. In August 2019, ZAG partnered with Brazilian children's channel Gloob (owned by Grupo Globo) to co-produce the fourth and fifth seasons of the animated series Miraculous, becomes the main exclusive broadcaster of the series in Brazil.

On July 30, 2020, European production company Planeta Junior acquired ZAG's stake, allowing the Spanish company to gradually increase its stake in ZAG over the next four years, potentially reaching 49% of the company.

With the continued global expansion of brands like Miraculous and Ghostforce, ZAG significantly strengthened its board of directors in April 2021. The company appointed Christophe Vallade, a professional with 16 years of prior experience at The Walt Disney Company France (where he managed online sales of Disney, Pixar, Marvel, and Star Wars licenses), as Vice President of Global E-Commerce. Simultaneously, Ben Johnson, formerly of MGA Entertainment, assumed the role of Senior Vice President of Legal Affairs and Litigation, becoming responsible for the international protection of the trademark portfolio and combating product counterfeiting. During this same period, founder Jeremy Zag highlighted that the franchise had already accumulated over 200 million products sold in global retail, driven by the release of the special Miraculous World: Shanghai – The Legend of Lady Dragon and preparations for the $100 million feature film.

In September 2021, the company established its first office in Latin America, located in Mexico City, for licensing and merchandising activities for ZAG's brands in Mexico and Central America. In February 2022, the company also opened an office in Buenos Aires, to expand its licensing and merchandising ZAG's brands in throughout South America (Argentina, Bolivia, Paraguay, and Uruguay).

In 2023, founder Jeremy Zag revealed the new ZAG logo on Instagram, symbolizing a new phase for the company with a renewed visual identity.

In May 2024, ZAG collaborated with French production company Mediawan to launch Miraculous Corp., a joint venture focused exclusively on the management, production, and expansion of the Miraculous franchise including the TV series. The new company is 60% owned by Mediawan and 40% by ZAG, with Jeremy Zag remaining as the project's founder and creative leader.

On February 18, 2025, the company formally expanded its creative and co-production infrastructure in Asia with the announcement of the ZAG JAPAN division. The strategic move aimed to establish a specific department to promote talent exchange and the joint development of projects between the offices in France, the United States, and Japan. Subsequently, on May 16, 2025, further details of the expansion were formalized with the appointment of Kanji Kazahaya, a former executive with 15 years of leadership at the renowned Toei Animation, to the position of Chief Operating Officer (COO) of the new Japanese subsidiary. Under Kazahaya's management, ZAG JAPAN set as its goal the exploration of the emotional and aesthetic depth of traditional local storytelling through the development of manga, anime series, and animated films. Operationally, the division began its activities by establishing a significant partnership with Highway Star, one of Japan's leading music talent agencies, chaired by Kiyoko Matsumura. Through this agreement, iconic artists such as Hironobu Kageyama (famous performer of songs from the Dragon Ball franchise) and Nami Tamaki have been confirmed for performing and producing music in future ZAG content.

== Filmography ==
=== Television series ===
Title	Creator	Original run	Network	Co-production with	Note(s)
Rosie	Romain Gadiou	2011–2014	Gulli	Gulli; 2 Minutes; Zagtoon	
Kobushi	Jeremy Zag; Nathanaël Bronn	2012	Gulli	Gulli; AB Productions	
Sammy & Co		2014	M6	nWave Pictures; Nexus Factory; StudioCanal	
Miraculous: Tales of Ladybug & Cat Noir	Thomas Astruc	2015–present	TF1; TFX	Toei Animation (S1–5); Toei Animation Europe S.A.S. (S1–5); Method Animation (S1–5); SAMG Entertainment (S1–3); SK Broadband (S1–3); De Agostini Editore (S2–S5); Gravity Animation, Inc. (S5); Kidsme S.R.L (S6–present)	Produced under Miraculous Corp. from season 6
Zak Storm	Zag Heroez; Man of Action	2016–2018	Gulli; Canal J	Method Animation; SAMG Animation; MNC Animation; SK Broadband; De Agostini Editore; ON Kids & Family; Man of Action Studios	
Double Rose	Cyril Dan Nathanael Bronn	2016-present			
Denver the Last Dinosaur	Peter Keefe	2018	M6	Method Animation; Neuxs Factory; Umedia	
Power Players	Jeremy Zag	2019–2021	France 4 Cartoon Network	Method Animation; Man of Action Studios; Planeta Group; WDR Mediagroup; Kaibou; ON Kids & Family	
Ghostforce	Jeremy Zag	2021–present	TFOU; EBS 1 Disney Channel	SAMG Animation; Kidsme S.R.L	
Ghostforce Evolution	Jeremy Zag	TBA	Netflix; TF1; Super RTL		

=== Films ===
Title	Release date	Co-production with	Distributed by	Note(s)
Ladybug & Cat Noir: The Movie	2023	The Awakening Production; SND	SND	
Ladybug & Cat Noir: The Movie 2	2027	Miraculous Corp. SND; John Cohen Productions; Magic Giraffe	SND	
