= Wyncor =

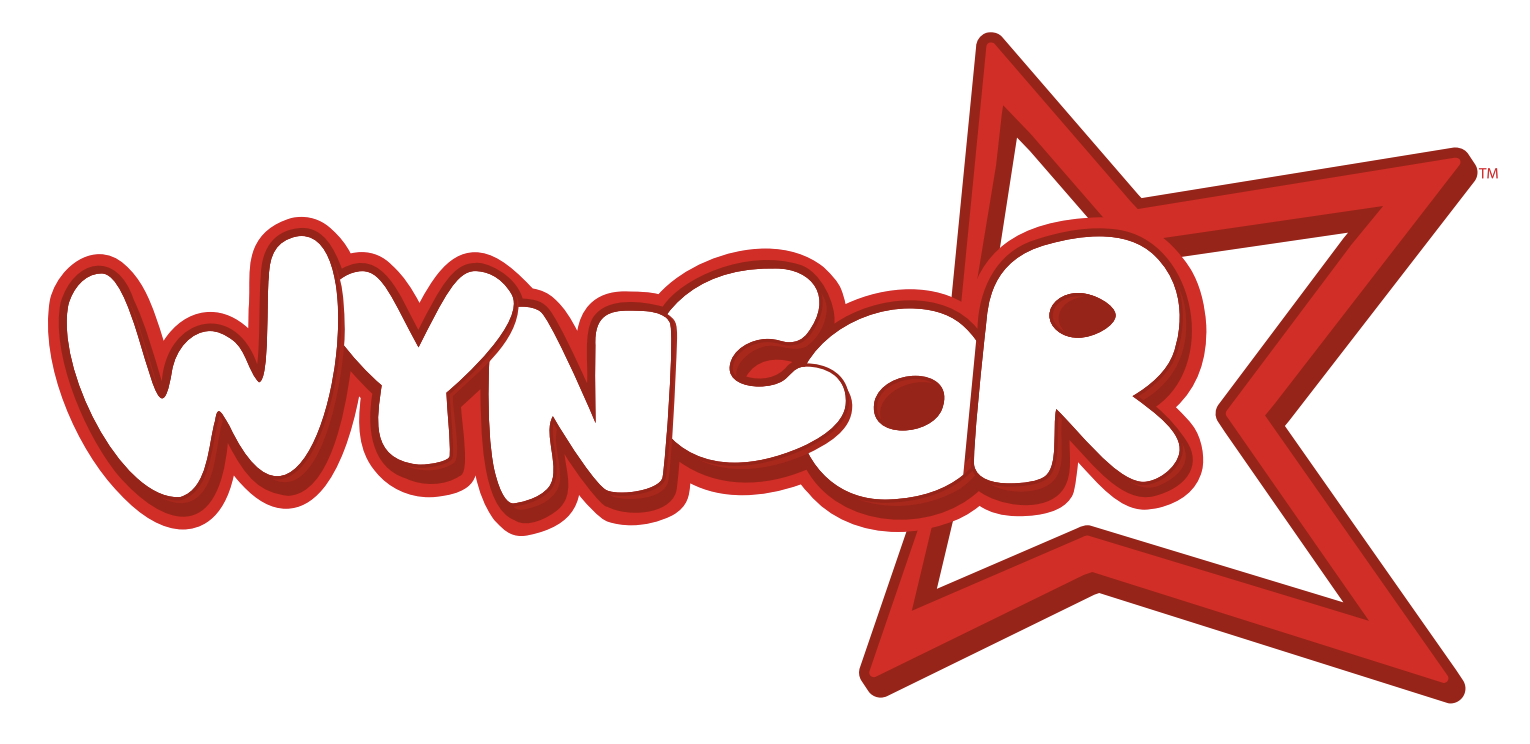
- Founded: December 2023
- Founder: Julian Jacob
- Headquarters: Paris, France
- Key people: Julian Jacob (CEO)
- Products: Television productions and toys
- Subsidiaries: Wyncor Media; Wyncor Content Distribution; Wyncor Products; Wyncor Licensing
- Website: www.wyncor.com

Wyncor is a Franco-American toys, audiovisual production and distribution group, that also manufacture and distribute licensed products. It was founded in December 2023 by French entrepreneur Julian Jacob.

The group (known as the Wync Group) is composed of Wyncor Media (audiovisual production), Wyncor Products (toy manufacturing and distribution), and Wyncor Content Distribution (audiovisual distribution). The group distributes its products worldwide through retailers such as Walmart, Target, Carrefour, Kohl's, La Grande Récré, The Entertainers, Amazon Europe, and Amazon USA.

Wyncor offers products such as the Miraball Surprise.

In 2025, the Wyncor Group signed a partnership with Hasbro.

In 2026, Wyncor signed a co-production agreement with the OUIDO group (studio producing Alvinnn!!! and the Chipmunks, Mickey Mouse, etc.) for the production of 2 animated series "The Kwaaks! and Babs!" and at the same time created a joint venture with OUIDO.

Wyncor supports and donates a portion of its revenue to cancer research and is a partner of Gustave Roussy.
