= Miraculous Corp. =

French production company and IP holder

- Type: Joint venture
- Industry: Brand management Media production
- Founded: May 13, 2024; 2 years ago
- Founder: Pierre-Antoine Capton; Jeremy Zag
- Headquarters: Paris, France
- Key people: Andy Yeatman (CEO); Heath Kenny (CCO); Ashley Depp (SVP, Marketing & Franchise); Roz Nowicki (Global Head of Consumer Products); Maria Doolan (Head of Content Partnerships & Distribution); Luc Schoumacher (CFO); Benjamin C. Johnson (Head of Legal) (Note: Benjamin C. Johnson also serves as SVP and Head of Legal at ZAG Entertainment since 2021.)
- Products: Television series; Film
- Brands: Miraculous franchise
- Owner: Mediawan (60%); ZAG, Inc. (40%)
- Subsidiaries: The Awakening Production

Miraculous Corp. is a French company owned as a joint venture with the European production company Mediawan and the French animation company ZAG Entertainment, founded on May 13, 2024, that is responsible for managing intellectual property and expanding the Miraculous franchise.

The company consists of the Miraculous franchise which includes Miraculous: Tales of Ladybug & Cat Noir, and the label The Awakening Production, which was founded a few years prior and produced Ladybug & Cat Noir: The Movie.

== History ==
On May 13, 2024, following the success of the French animated series Miraculous: Tales of Ladybug & Cat Noir, ZAG Entertainment partnered with Mediawan to create the joint venture Miraculous Corp, which became responsible for controlling, managing and expanding the franchise. In the shareholding structure, Mediawan owns 60% of the company, while ZAG retains the remaining 40%. Jeremy Zag remains the main shareholder and board member, continuing to oversee the creative development of new storylines and heroes.

On June 10, 2024, the company hired Andy Yeatman as CEO of Miraculous Corp USA and globally. Yeatman, formerly a director at Moonbug Entertainment and founder of Netflix's children's content division, was chosen to lead business operations and the growth of the franchise into an "expanded universe." Under his leadership, the company plans to development new TV movies, spin-off series, and the film Miraculous: Le Film 2.

The administrative expansion continued on October 17, 2024, with the appointment of Roz Nowicki as Global Head of Consumer Products. Nowicki previously worked with Mattel, Peanuts Worldwide, 20th Century Fox, 4Kids Entertainment, Universal Pictures and The Walt Disney Company. Under her leadership, the company charted global strategies for consumer products, games, promotions and live events.

In December 2024, the corporation announced two more appointments. Heath Kenny, with 25 years of experience at Mercury Filmworks and Gaumont Animation, took on the role of Chief Content Officer, coordinating the creation and delivery of new formats across all platforms. Ashley Depp, formerly of Paramount Pictures and having led marketing strategies for Top Gun: Maverick and Sonic the Hedgehog, in addition to a 13-year career at Universal Studios, is Senior Vice President of Marketing and Franchising. Deep is responsible for amplifying the brand's narrative and leading the franchise's strategic planning. The management team also includes Maria Doolan (Partnerships and Content Distribution), Luc Schoumacher (Chief Financial Officer), who also performs financial and operational functions within the Mediawan group, and Ben Johnson (Head Legal), responsible for the company's global legal affairs and also Senior Vice President of Legal at ZAG Entertainment.

On June 11, 2025, during the Annecy Festival, Miraculous Corp. announced an expansion for the Miraculous franchise. Plans for seasons 6, 7, and 8, and the special Miraculous World: Rio were revealed. One of the highlights was the project for the television film Miraculous World: Tokyo, Stellar Force (released on November 1, 2025), which features Power Rangers-style hero costumes and uses hand-drawn 2D animation inspired by Japanese anime. On October 1, 2025, the company appointed WildBrain CPLG to lead licensing efforts outside the Americas including EMEA and Asia-Pacific, consolidating the global strategy for the franchise's 10th anniversary. As part of this new phase, the corporation confirmed the release of a full season of Miraculous Chibi for the end of 2025 and the premiere of the first official spin-off series, Miraculous Stellar Force, scheduled to premiere in 2027, marking the expansion of the franchise's narrative universe.

On May 27, 2026, the company confirmed its presence at the 2026 Annecy International Animation Film Festival, with the aim of presenting its line of productions, including the seventh season of the main series and the Chibi and Stellar Force projects. The corporation's delegation at the event, located at booth C21, included executives Andy Yeatman, Heath Kenny, Maria Doolan, Jean-Yves Patay, Marc Cherruau, Jaufret Toublan, and Stanislas Mako.

In June 2026, the corporation reinforced its location-based entertainment (LBE) strategy. On June 9, 2026, the expansion of the partnership with WildBrain CPLG was announced to grow immersive experiences and themed attractions in the EMEA (Europe, Middle East, and Africa) and Asia-Pacific regions. Additionally, an agreement was formalized with Ground Control Entertainment to expand the presence of Miraculous Family Entertainment Centers in the Middle East, with new units planned for Jeddah and Mecca, Saudi Arabia. These initiatives reflect Miraculous Corp.'s commitment to consolidating the brand as a global multi-platform franchise, expanding its physical and digital presence in the global entertainment market.

== Productions ==
=== Television ===
Title	Original run	Network	Co-production with	Note(s)
Miraculous: Tales of Ladybug & Cat Noir	2015–present	TF1; TFX	ZAG, Inc. Kidsme S.R.L	Season 6 onward, inherited from Method Animation and Toei Animation
Miraculous Chibi (Note: Based on the shorts of the same name)	2025	TBA	ZAG, Inc.	
Miraculous Stellar Force	2027	TBA (Note: The original network is unknown but Disney Channel is a commissioner.)	ZAG, Inc.	
Untitled Miraculous live-action series	TBA	TBA	ZAG, Inc.	

=== Films ===
Title	Release date	Co-production with	Distributed by	Note(s)
Ladybug & Cat Noir: The Movie (Note: Under The Awakening Production banner which was founded before the company.)	2023	SND	SND	
Ladybug & Cat Noir: The Movie 2	2027	SND; John Cohen Productions; Magic Giraffe	SND	
