= Ladybug & Cat Noir: The Movie (soundtrack) =

Soundtrack album for 2023 French film

Miraculous, le film – La bande originale

Soundtrack album by various artists
- Released: 30 June 2023
- Genre: Pop; musical theatre
- Length: 39:56
- Label: TF1 Musique (Muzeek One)
- Producer: Jeremy Zag; Michael Gracey

Singles from Miraculous, le film – La bande originale
- 1. "Plus forts ensemble" Released: 9 June 2023; 2. "Courage en moi" Released: 21 July 2023

Miraculous, le film – La bande originale is the soundtrack album for the 2023 French film Ladybug & Cat Noir: The Movie. It was released by Muzeek One under the TF1 Musique label on 30 June 2023. A separate film score album was released on 5 July 2023.

== Background ==
During the 2018 Comic Con Experience, Jeremy Zag announced that Ladybug & Cat Noir: The Movie was a musical and would feature music composed by himself. Australian filmmaker Michael Gracey joined the film as executive producer to help develop the musical aspect.

A showcase with Ladybug and Cat Noir's singing voices, Lou and Elliott, was organized at the Salon Gustave Eiffel on the first floor of the Eiffel Tower on 28 June 2023 to promote the soundtrack. Another showcase was organized at the 2023 Japan Expo on 14 July.

== Release ==
The soundtrack album was released on 30 June 2023 by Muzeek One under the TF1 Musique label, with distribution handled by Sony Music Entertainment France. A limited edition of the soundtrack was released with a 15 centimeter plush toys and a Ladybug mask. Editions autographed by Lou and Elliott or Jeremy Zag were also published later.

=== Singles ===
"Plus forts ensemble" by Lou and Elliott was released as the album's lead single on 9 June 2023. The music video was released on 21 June 2023. A second single, "Courage en moi" by Lou, was released on 21 July, followed by a music video on 23 July.

== Track listing ==
All songs are composed by Jeremy Zag, and written by Zag, Michael Gracey, Chris Read, and Britt Burton

Miraculous, le film – La bande originale track listing
No.	Title	Performer(s)	Length
1.	"Si je croyais en moi"	Lou	3:13
2.	"Pour un moment avec toi"	Elliott	1:38
3.	"Tu es Ladybug"	Lou and Cerise Calixte	2:43
4.	"Ma Lady"	Elliott	2:11
5.	"Papillon"	Antoine Tomé	2:35
6.	"Courage en moi"	Lou	3:21
7.	"Plus forts ensemble"	Lou and Elliott	4:28
8.	"Être moi"	Lou	2:50
9.	"Now I See You"	Lou and Drew Ryan Scott	3:25
10.	"Amis ou ennemis ?"		1:52
11.	"Seuls au monde"		1:20
12.	"Tu as changé ma vie"		1:18
13.	"Cœur brisé"		1:10
14.	"Moment de vérité"		3:53
15.	"Courage en moi (Version alternative)"		3:06
16.	"Générique de la série (Miraculous VF Remix)"	Lou and Elliott	2:45
Total length:			39:56

== Score album ==
Miraculous, le film – Les musiques

Film score by Jeremy Zag
- Released: 5 July 2023
- Genre: Film score
- Length: 52:55
- Label: TF1 Musique (Muzeek One)
- Producer: Jeremy Zag

A separate film score album was released on 5 July 2023 by Muzeek One, the same day as the film's French theatrical release.

All songs are composed by Zag.

Miraculous, le film – Les musiques track listing
No.	Title	Length
1.	"La Légende du Miraculous"	1:17
2.	"La vie à Paris !"	1:49
3.	"Amis ou ennemis ?"	1:52
4.	"L'amour d'une vie"	0:52
5.	"Regrets et secrets"	2:05
6.	"Place aux Ténèbres"	1:53
7.	"Fuir"	2:00
8.	"La Bague et le Chat"	0:40
9.	"Qui sauve une vie, sauve le monde"	1:13
10.	"Tikki, une rencontre magique"	1:13
11.	"Le Destin de Ladybug"	1:37
12.	"Cœur de pierre"	3:20
13.	"Deux moitiés sont plus fortes dans l'ensemble"	2:18
14.	"Secrets entre amis"	1:12
15.	"Le Casse"	0:51
16.	"Le Jardin des Tuileries"	1:32
17.	"Montagnes Russes !"	5:11
18.	"Seuls au monde"	1:20
19.	"Tu as changé ma vie"	1:18
20.	"Cœur brisé"	1:10
21.	"L'Attaque de l'Akuma"	2:32
22.	"Cœur brisé"	1:19
23.	"Derrière le masque"	1:55
26.	"Courage en moi (Version alternative)"	3:06
27.	"Moment de vérité"	3:53
28.	"Le Pouvoir de l'amour"	1:54
29.	"Le Bal de l'Opéra"	1:22
30.	"Laissez tomber les masques"	2:11
Total length:		52:55

== Reception ==
Music critic Jonathan Broxton commented "Jeremy Zag handles the tonal shifts well, captures the emotional content of the story, and allows his music to build to some superbly satisfying heights, especially in the action sequences and in the stirringly emotional finale." Lori C. of Ready Steady Cut felt that "The music could have been better. Not only are most of the songs forgettable, but it's also obvious that the voice actors and the singers are different people, and the contrast between voices takes away from the story." Tessa Smith of Mama's Geeky called it as "catchy and entertaining".

== Foreign language versions ==
Foreign language versions of the album were released on 5 July 2023, alongside the score album, in international territories were the film was released theatrically. For the territories where the film was distributed by Netflix, it was released on 28 July 2023.

=== English version ===
Miraculous: Ladybug & Cat Noir, The Movie (Original Soundtrack)

Soundtrack album by various artists
- Released: 28 July 2023
- Genre: Pop; musical theatre
- Length: 82:07
- Label: 22D Music
- Producer: Jeremy Zag; Michael Gracey

Singles from Miraculous: Ladybug & Cat Noir, The Movie (Original Soundtrack)
- 1. "If I Believed in Me" Released: 28 July 2023

Miraculous: Ladybug & Cat Noir, The Movie (Original Soundtrack) is the English version of the soundtrack. It was released on 28 July 2023 by 22D Music, with distribution handled by Lakeshore Records. The soundtrack release coincided with the Netflix release of the film in selected territories.

The soundtrack consisted of 38 tracks, that included the songs and score in a single album unlike the original French version.

In the English version, Lou reprises Marinette's singing voice, with Drew Ryan Scott providing the singing voice for Cat Noir, Mela Lee for Tikki, and Keith Silverstein for Gabriel Agreste. The English version of "Si je croyais en moi", titled "If I Believed in Me", was released as a promotional single on 28 July 2023, to promote the film release on Netflix in English speaking territories.

All songs are composed by Jeremy Zag, and written by Zag, Michael Gracey, Chris Read, and Britt Burton

No.	Title	Artist(s)	Length
1.	"If I Believed In Me"	Lou	3:14
2.	"Alone Again"	Drew Ryan Scott	1:38
3.	"You Are Ladybug"	Lou and Mela Lee	2:43
4.	"My Lady"	Drew Ryan Scott	2:12
5.	"Chaos Will Reign Today"	Keith Silverstein	2:36
6.	"Courage In Me"	Lou	3:21
7.	"Stronger Together"	Lou and Drew Ryan Scott	4:28
8.	"Reaching Out"	Lou	2:50
9.	"Now I See"	Lou and Drew Ryan Scott	3:25
10.	"Opening Credits of the Series (Miraculous Ladybug V/A Remix)"	Lou and Drew Ryan Scott	2:45
11.	"The Legend of the Miraculous"		1:17
12.	"Life in Paris"		1:49
13.	"Friends and Frenemies"		1:52
14.	"The Love of a Lifetime"		0:52
15.	"Regrets and Secrets"		2:05
16.	"Let Darkness Rise"		1:53
17.	"Running Away"		2:00
18.	"The Ring and the Cat"		0:40
19.	"Who Saves a Life Saves the World"		1:13
20.	"Tikki a Magical Encounter"		1:13
21.	"The Ladybug Destiny"		1:37
22.	"Stoneheart"		3:20
23.	"Two Halves Are Stronger As a Whole"		2:18
24.	"Secrets Between Friends"		1:12
25.	"The Heist"		0:51
26.	"Le jardin des Tuileries"		1:32
27.	"Rollercoasters!"		5:11
28.	"Alone in the World"		1:20
29.	"Since I've Met You"		1:18
30.	"The Empty Heart Behind the Mask"		1:10
31.	"The Akumas Attack"		2:32
32.	"All Is Lost"		1:19
33.	"The True Hero Is Behind the Mask"		1:55
34.	"Courage in Me (Alternative Version)"		3:06
35.	"Moment of Truth"		3:53
36.	"The Power of Love"		1:54
37.	"The Opera Ball"		1:22
38.	"Drop the Masks"		2:11
Total length:			82:07

== Additional songs ==
Additionally the songs "You Spin Me Round (Like a Record)" by Dead or Alive and "Careless Whisper" by Wham! are featured inside the movie.
