= Volkswagen e-Beetle =

Overview
- Manufacturer: Volkswagen; eClassics
- Also called: e-Käfer

Body and chassis
- Class: Compact car (C)
- Body style: 2-door coupé & convertible
- Layout: RR
- Related: VW e-Up!

Powertrain
- Electric motor: 82 PS (60.3 kW; 80.9 hp) Permanent magnet synchronous motor
- Transmission: 1-sp
- Battery: 36.8 kWh Li-ion

Dimensions
- Kerb weight: 1,280 kg (2,822 lb)

Chronology
- Predecessor: Volkswagen Beetle (Car Body)

The Volkswagen e-Beetle is a modified automobile first shown in October 2019 at IAA in Frankfurt. A donor Volkswagen Type 1303 Super Beetle convertible was updated by replacing the original petrol drivetrain with the electric motor, transmission, and battery used in the e-Up. Parts were taken from the regular Volkswagen production line, and installed by specialist partner eClassics in Renningen after consulting with Volkswagen Group Components.

== Design and development ==
Externally, the e-Käfer may be distinguished from a classic Beetle by the car's running boards; these are thicker on the e-Käfer to conceal the depth of the floor-mounted battery pack. The converted car retains the original rear-drive, rear-motor layout.

== Performance ==
The e-Up drivetrain is rated at an output of 81 hp (60 kW; 82 PS) and 210 N⋅m (155 lb⋅ft) as installed in the e-Beetle, which is equipped with a 36.8 kWh lithium-ion battery for a range of 200 km (124 mi). A larger battery, 45 kWh, and an uprated motor, 101 hp (75 kW; 102 PS), are available at extra cost.

The converted e-Beetle weighs 1,280 kg (2,822 lb).

== Production ==
The chassis for the e-Beetle is marketed at a retail price of €39,900 alone, or €99,900 for a complete converted vehicle that is ready to drive. The upgraded battery and motor are also available for an extra €15,900.

eClassics intend for the technology in the battery-electric conversion to be applied to other classic Volkswagen products. In March 2020, Volkswagen Commercial Vehicles showed the e-BULLI, a conversion of a 1966 T1 Samba Bus performed by eClassics using the same e-Up drivetrain as the e-Beetle, distinct from prior electrified Volkswagen small concept vans such as the Bulli (2011), BUDD-e (2016), and ID.BUZZ (2017). The e-BULLI battery is slightly larger than the e-Beetle battery, at 45 kWh, but the range remains the same 124 miles (200 km). The cost of the e-BULLI conversion is €64,900.
