= Highway Star =

Highway Star may refer to:

- "Highway Star" (song), a song on Deep Purple's 1972 album Machine Head
- Highway Star, the band that became Stiff Little Fingers
- Highway Star (manga), a 1979 graphic novel by Katsuhiro Otomo
- Highway Star (film)
- Highway Star, a Stand featured in Diamond is Unbreakable named after the Deep Purple song
- Highway Star or Rad Racer, a 1987 NES video game by Square
- Highway Star is car model brand name of Nissan
