= Mediawan Kids & Family =

Children's entertainment division of French media conglomerate Mediawan

- Formerly: ON Entertainment (2014–2018); ON Kids & Family (2018–2022)
- Type: Division
- Industry: Animation
- Founded: January 16, 2014; 12 years ago
- Founder: Aton Soumache; Dimitri Rassam
- Headquarters: Paris, France
- Key people: Julien Borde (president)
- Parent: Mediawan (2018–present)
- Divisions: Mediawan Kids & Family Cinema; Mediawan Kids & Family Distribution; Mediawan Kids & Family Licensing
- Subsidiaries: Elliott Studio; Method Animation; Picture Box; Palomar Animation; Somewhere Animation; Submarine; Toon2Tango (with Leonine Studios); Wildseed Studios; Wonderland Junior TV
- Website: mediawankidsandfamily.com

Mediawan Kids & Family (formerly known as ON Entertainment and ON Kids & Family) is the children's production and distribution division of French media conglomerate Mediawan that produces & distributes premium children's and family content globally. It is a European leader in animation, creating premium TV shows, films, and digital content through several production labels mainly and partnerships. premium children's television series, digital content and feature films.

== History ==
Mediawan Kids & Family was originally established as a film & television production company called ON Entertainment on January 16, 2014, when Aton Soumache decided to merge its animation production company Method Animation alongside its feature animation subsidiary Onyx Films (including its post-production & CGI feature studio Onyx Lux) with Dimitri Rassam's live-action film production outfit Chapter 2 to launch new leading film & television production group named ON Entertainment with the new company launching its focus on producing content as Method Animation including its feature film subsidiary Onyx Films and film production company Chapter 2 became labels of the new production and audiovisual group with the former became ON's animation label through the ON Kids & Family division with Method's feature film subsidiary Onyx Films moved from the former to become ON's animated feature film division alongside live-action film production house Chapter 2 which became ON's live-action film production label.

In September 2016 one year before Mediawan's acquisition of ON Entertainment, ON Entertainment expanded its animation production operations into North America as the entertainment production company had established an in-house North American animation studio outside of France called ON Animation Studios Montréal. The new studio will based in Montréal, Canada and would increase ON's animated feature film production.

=== Acquisition by Mediawan ===
In December 2017, Mediawan announced they were in exclusive talks to acquiring a majority stake of Paris-based entertainment & animation production group ON Entertainment who owns live-action film production house Chapter 2 and its animation label Method Animation under the ON Kids & Family division alongside their feature film division ON Animation Studios, their post-production & CGI feature studio Onyx Lux and their Montreal-based feature animation production studio for about €50 million in order for them to enter the animation and feature film businesses. A year later in June 2018, Mediawan completed its acquisition of a majority stake in ON Entertainment alongside its animation studios Method Animation and ON Animation Studios & the latter's live-action production unit Chapter 2, the acquisition marked Mediawan's first entry into the animation market and gave Mediawan their own animation studio. Following its completion of Mediawan's acquisition of ON Entertainment, Mediawan restructured its operations into four groups and rebranded ON Entertainment as their children's subsidiary renamed to ON Kids & Family after ON's division with Chapter 2 moved into Mediawan's feature film production division.

Two months later in September of that year following Mediawan completed its acquisition of ON Entertainment & renamed it to ON Kids & Family, ON Kids & Family had appointed former Planeta Junior & France Television Distribution SVP of Sale, Erick Rouillé, to become its senior vice-president of co-productions and business development.

In April 2019 one year after Mediawan brought Paris-based production group ON Entertainment in June 2018, Mediawan alongside its children's subsidiary ON Kids & Family formed a partnership with world-known French author and illustrator Joann Sfar to adapt his works into film and television with Mediawan and its subsidiary ON Kids & Family's acquisition of a majority stake in Joann Sfar's animation production company Nice Pictures, marking ON Kids & Family's first acquisition and placed it under the latter subsidiary & would undergo a major rebranding and a state of series and movies.

In June 2020 following ON Kids & Family's acquisition of Joann Sfar's Paris-based production outfit Nice Pictures one year prior in June 2019 and whilst during the online Annecy Animation Film Festival, ON Kids & Family had rebranded its Paris-based production subsidiary Nice Pictures as their mini-studio, renaming it to Magical Society with Veteran animation producer, founder of Method Animation founder and ON Kids & Family co-founder Aton Soumache joining the rebranded production unit as renowned comic book artist & filmmaker Joann Sfar continued heading the rebranded production company with the release of its first movie based on Sfar's comic book series Little Vampire.

=== Rebranding to Mediawan Kids & Family ===
In June 2022, Mediawan had brought all of their kids & family activities and ramping up their youth entertainment content by rebranding their subsidiary ON Kids & Family and reformatting it as a division through the Mediawan name rebranded it to Mediawan Kids & Family effectively retiring the ON name after seven years with their animation production labels Method Animation, Magical Society, ON Animation Studios and ON Classics being placed under the newly renamed division with the latter two retaining the ON name. Mediawan also announced that they had launched two new production labels which was traditional animation production studio Somewhere Animation and live-action studio Elliott Studio which would be part of the division, whilst the rebranded division Mediawan Kids & Family launched its own in-house distribution label called Mediawan Kids & Family Distribution which will handle distribution to all of their live action and animated programmes along with third-party programmes from outside studios.

Four months later in October of that year following the rebranding of ON Kids & Family to Mediawan Kids & Family, Mediawan Kids & Family had partnered with Academy Award-nominated director Sylvain Chomet to form a new dedicated animation production label entitled Picture Box.

In February 2023 following the rebranding of Mediawan's production subsidiary-turned division ON Kids & Family to Mediawan Kids & Family, Mediawan Kids & Family entered the British film & television production operations as they had acquired a majority stake in Bristol-based British scripted and animation production company Wildseed Studios, making it Mediawan Kids & Family's first international acquisition with Wildseed Studios became a production label within Mediawan Kids & Family. Two months later in April 2023, Mediawan Kids & Family alongside its parent Mediawan via its film production division Mediawan Pictures had brought Amsterdam-based Dutch independent film & television production company and animation production studio Submarine, marking Mediawan Kids & Family's second expansion this time into the Netherlands as Submarine became its Dutch production label under Mediawan Kids & Family.

In September 2023, Mediawan Kids & Family stregnthed its British production services with them and its Paris-based entertainment & animation label Magical Society established its British production label based in London entitled Magical Society UK and its crime-genre label Magical North marking the label's entry into the British animation market, with the new London-based British animation subsidiary Magical Society UK will plan to produce live-action & animated adaptations Joann Sfar's works as well as producing original series with Virdee became its first series produced by the UK division of Magical Society through its unit Magical North with former head of UK Film Council's New Cinema Fund and Filmwave founder Paul Trijbits leading Magical Society's British division under the role of producer whilst Laura Douras and former Universal Pictures and Focus Features international executive JJ Lousberg joined as MD & producer and head of finance of the new UK label.

In February 2025, Mediawan Kids & Family had shuttered down its Montreal-based feature film ank Imation production subsidiary ON Animation Studios following the collapse of the entire Quebec animation industry effectively ending the ON name entirely after 11 years with Mediawan Kids & Family's feature film division Mediawan Kids & Family Cinema alongside parent Mediawan Kids & Family's fellow joint venture production company Miraculous Corp. taken over their animated film production activities in-house and will collaborate with partner studios around the world.

In March 2025 when Mediawan Kids & Family's parent Mediawan merged with German production and distribution company Leonine Studios one year prior in April 2024, Mediawan Kids & Family enterted a stragic partnership with Toon2Tango the animation subsidiary of Mediawan-owned German production and distribution company Leonine Studios via its animation division Leonine Animation Studios to interrogate distribution of Toon2Tango's content portfolio and the German animation studio itself into Mediawan Kids & Family as Toon2Tango became Mediawan Kids & Family's German animation production studio and as a subsidiary while Mediawan Kids & Family's own distribution division Mediawan Kids & Family Distribution had assumed distribution to Toon2Tango'a programming catalogue with Toon2Tango's future productions will now be distributed under Mediawan Kids & Family distribution services.

In January 2026, Mediawan Kids & Family partnered with educational kids brand & multi-platform channel StoryZoo & Friends with Mediawan Kids & Family had licensed two of its action-adventure brands which were the first season of Robin Hood: Mischief in Sherwood and two seasons of Power Players, produced by its animation production subsidiary Method Animation to the StoryZoo & Friends platform for the service's programming lineup.

In June 2026 during the Annecy International Animation Film Festival of that year, Mediawan Kids & Family had expanded into the first major digital expansion into the United States (U.S.) television market & increased its international digital expansion strategy by collorborating with Mediawan Thematics to forming Mediawan Kids & Family's own FAST channel & a dedicated YouTube channel named Wonderland Junior TV, that could bring Mediawan Kids & Family's programming catalogue including those from its animation label Method Animation and German animation unit Toon2Tango like Ki & Hi in the Panda Kingdom, The 3 Musketeers and Monster Loving Maniacs while the new channel would air Mediawan Kids & Family's new programming from 2027 onwards such as Astro Boy Reboot and Karters, alongside animated programming catalogue from European outside animation studios as the new FAST channel became available on AVOD & FAST streaming services such as Kidoodle TV.

== Production labels ==
=== Toon2Tango ===
Toon2Tango is a Munich-based German animation and kids & family production that is a subsidiary of Mediawan Kids & Family and also part of German production and distribution group Leonine Holding through its animation division Leonine Animation Studios. It was established in July 2019 by former Made 4 Entertainment (m4e) co-founder and Studio 100 Media CEO Hans Ulrich Stoef.

In December 2023 one year before the full acquisition of Toon2Tango's German film and television production and distribution parent Leonine Studios by Mediawan Kids & Family's parent Mediawan, Leonine Studios who had held a 25% minority stake in Munich-based animation production and distribution unit Toon2Tango one year prior and had previously distributed or produced animated series and films had announced that they are launching their own in-house animation production studio division named Leonine Animation Studios GmbH and announcing that they have taken full control of Munich animation producer and distributor Toon2Tango and becoming a wholly owned subsidiary of Leonine Animation Studios with Toon2Tango's founder and managing directors Hans Ulrich Stoef and Jo Daris leading Leonine's new animation production division and continued leading Toon2Tango through Leonine's animation division.

In March 2025 when Mediawan Kids & Family's parent Mediawan merged with German production and distribution company Leonine Studios one year prior in April 2024, Mediawan Kids & Family enterted a stragic partnership with Toon2Tango the animation subsidiary of Mediawan-owned German production and distribution company Leonine Studios via its animation division Leonine Animation Studios to interrogate distribution of Toon2Tango's content portfolio and the German animation studio itself into Mediawan Kids & Family as Toon2Tango became Mediawan Kids & Family's German animation production studio and as a subsidiary while Mediawan Kids & Family's own distribution division Mediawan Kids & Family Distribution had assumed distribution to Toon2Tango'a programming catalogue with Toon2Tango's future productions will now be distributed under Mediawan Kids & Family distribution services.

==== Filmography ====
Title	Years	Network	Notes
Monster Loving Maniacs	2023–present	Super RTL; Nickelodeon Italy; DR (Denmark); SVT (Sweden); NRK (Norway); Ketnet (Belgium)	co-production with Mondo TV, Belvision, Ja Film and Ginger Pictures; Co-distributed with Mondo TV and Mediawan Kids & Family Distribution since 2025
Grisù	2023–present	Kika; Rai Yoyo & Rai Play (Italy)	co-production with Mondo TV, Mondo TV France and ZDF Studios
Agent 203	2024–present	Super RTL; Rai Gulp (Italy)	co-production with Mondo TV, V House Animation and Cosmos Maya; Co-distributed with Mondo TV and Mediawan Kids & Family Distribution since 2025
Littlest Robot	TBA	TBA	co-production with Method Animation and V House Animation
Eldrador	TBA	TBA	co-production with Method Animation and Schleich

=== Wildseed Studios ===
Wildseed Studios is a British film and television production subsidiary of Mediawan Kids & Family based in Bristol that specializes in live-action and animated films and shows. It was founded in April 2013 when former Aardman Animations head of broadcast Miles Bullough stepped own at and former BBC creative executive Jesse Cleverly teamed up to launch a new British production studio to produce series for online platforms.

On October 11, 2016, Wildseed Studios launched a new digital feature-length production studio called Wildseed Movies that would develop and produce microbuster feature films for online platforms with British film & television studio Pinewood Studios financially supporting Wildseed Studios' digital feature-length production division.

==== Filmography ====
Title	Years	Network	Notes
Counterfeit Cat	2016–2017	Disney XD; Teletoon (Canada)	co-production with Tricon Kids & Family
PrankMe	2017	Fullscreen	
Dodo	2021–present	Sky Kids	co-production with Cake Entertainment, Telegael, Toonz Media Group and Ingenious Media
The Last Bus	2022	Netflix	
Ama's Story	2023	Sky Kids	
Tuff Pom	2026–present	CBBC; France 4 (France)	co-production with Method Animation
That's Jokes	November 9, 2026	CBBC	Originally entitled Collide-Oscope
The Magic Roundabout	TBA	TBA	Took over development and originally ordered at Method Animation; co-production with Magic!
