= Mad Cave Studios =

American comic book publisher

- Status: Active
- Founded: 2014
- Founder: Laura Chacón
- Country of origin: United States
- Headquarters location: Miami, Florida
- Distribution: Simon & Schuster
- Publication types: Comics
- Fiction genres: Action, adventure, science fiction, mystery
- Official website: https://www.madcavestudios.com/

Mad Cave Studios (also known simply as Mad Cave) is an independent comic book publisher based in Miami, Florida; it was established in 2014. Mad Cave has published a range of comic books and trade paperbacks which were originally distributed by Diamond Comic Distributors.

== Overview ==
The publisher was founded in 2014 by Laura Chacón and overrun by Mark London. In February 2018, Mad Cave published the first issue of its flagship title, Battlecats. It released a second series, Midnight Task Force that July. In November 2018, Mad Cave Studios released the first issue of Knights of the Golden Sun. Their fourth title Honor and Curse launched in February 2019.

Digital versions of their comics are available at ComiXology. and Drive Thru Comics.

In September, they announced a young adult graphic novel imprint called Maverick to debut in the fall of 2021.

In July 2024, Mad Cave announced Amazing Comics, a new comic book company based in Idaho and headed by Joe Quesada. The company is a joint venture with Belgian publisher Dupuis.

=== "Talent Search" ===
In 2018, Mad Cave ran a "Talent Search" for new comic book writers and artists. Finalists worked on comic books for Mad Cave. The comic book Show's End was the first title to feature work from the 2018 Talent Search winners, launching in August 2019. The Talent Search was run again in 2019 for both writers and artists.

The third Talent Search from June 1 to September 1, 2020. Six winners had their work published in an anthology comic book.

== Staff ==
- Laura Chacón (founder)
- Mark London (CEO and CCO)
- Mark Irwin (President)
- Kurt Nelson (Executive Vice President of Sales)
- Chris Fernandez (Publisher)
- Mike Marts (Editor-in-Chief)
- Allison Pond (Vice President of Marketing)
- Maya Lopez (Senior Marketing Manager)
- Kristen Simon (Senior Editor)
- Sarah Brunstad (Editor)
- Troy-Jefferey Allen (Digital Marketing Specialist)

== Imprints ==
- Mad Cave Studios (2014–present)
- Maverick (2021–present)
- Papercutz (2005–present; acquired in 2022)
- Nakama Press (2024–present)
- Amazing Comics (2024–present; joint venture with Dupuis)
