= Ladybird (disambiguation) =

Ladybirds (Coccinellidae) are a family of beetles.

Ladybird may also refer to:

== Arts and media ==
=== Film and television ===
- The Ladybird (film), a 1927 American silent film
- Ladybird, Ladybird (film), a 1994 UK drama-documentary about a woman losing custody of her four children
- Ladybird (King of the Hill), Hank Hill's dog on King of the Hill

=== Music ===
==== Bands and performers ====
- The Ladybirds, a British trio most noted for appearing on The Benny Hill Show in the 1960s, 1970s, and 1980s, usually as backup vocals
- The Ladybirds (band), an American retro garage rock band active since 2007
- LadybiRdS, an American pop rock band active since 2005

==== Songs ====
- "Ladybird", a track on Everybody Loves a Happy Ending by 1980s British pop band Tears for Fears
- "Ladybird", a track on the album 604 by the band Ladytron
- "Ladybird", a song on the 1983 album Mummer by English band XTC
- Ladybird Ladybird, an English nursery rhyme (also known as Ladybug Ladybug in North America)

==== Albums ====
- Ladybird (Dexter Gordon album), 1965, released in 2005
- Ladybird (Shit and Shine album), 2005

=== Other uses in arts and media ===
- The Ladybird, a novella by D. H. Lawrence
- Ladybird Books, a children's book publisher, based in London

== Other uses ==
- Ladybird (clothing), a British children's clothing label sold to Shop Direct
- Ladybird of Szeged (Szegedi Katicabogár), an early robot constructed in Hungary in 1956–1957
- Two species of Eresus, commonly known as "Ladybird spiders"
- HMS Ladybird, one of several ships of the British Royal Navy
- Ladybird (web browser), software, originally part of the SerenityOS project

== See also ==
- Lady Bird (disambiguation)
- Lady Bug (disambiguation)
