= Lady Bird =

Lady Bird may refer to:

== Arts and media ==
- Lady Bird (film), a 2017 film directed by Greta Gerwig
- Lady Bird (duo), a dance music crew from Japan
- "Lady Bird" (composition), a jazz standard by Tadd Dameron
- "Lady Bird", a song by Lee Hazlewood, in duet with Nancy Sinatra, on the album Nancy & Lee
- Lady Bird (album), a 1978 album by Archie Shepp
- Lady Bird, a character in the animated series Adventure Time episode "Hoots"

== Other uses ==
- Lady Bird, the moniker of jazz saxophonist Bert Etta Davis
- Lady Bird Johnson, a popular nickname for Claudia Alta Taylor Johnson, the First Lady of the United States from 1963 to 1969
- Lady Bird Cleveland, American artist
- Lady Bird Lake, a reservoir on the Colorado River in Austin, Texas
- Ladybird (web browser), an open-source web browser

== See also ==
- Ladybird (disambiguation)
- Ladybug (disambiguation)
