= Adrien Agreste =

Male protagonist of Miraculous: Tales of Ladybug & Cat Noir

Adrien Agreste Cat Noir
- Miraculous: Tales of Ladybug & Cat Noir character
- A render of Adrien Agreste from seasons 1-5
- First appearance: "Stormy Weather" (2015)
- Created by: Thomas Astruc
- Voiced by: English Bryce Papenbrook; French Benjamin Bollen
- Inspired by: Catwoman; Black Cat

In-universe information
- Full name: Adrien Émile Gabriel Donatien Athanase Agreste
- Alias: Cat Noir
- Species: Human-Sentimonster (as Adrien); Black cat-based superhuman (as Cat Noir)
- Occupation: Student; Superhero; Model (formerly)
- Weapon: Extendable staff (as Cat Noir)
- Home: Paris
- Nationality: French
- Abilities: Destruction (main); Enhanced agility, dexterity, hearing, smell, speed, and strength; Nigh-invulnerability; Night vision; Super stealth (all as Cat Noir)

Adrien Agreste (French pronunciation: [adʁijɛ̃ aɡʁɛst]) is the titular co-protagonist of Miraculous: Tales of Ladybug & Cat Noir, created by Thomas Astruc. He is a French teenage student who has been homeschooled for most of his life and is also a model for his father, Gabriel Agreste, a famous fashion designer with whom Adrien has a distant and emotionally damaged relationship. Adrien is one of the main superheroes alongside Ladybug, for whom he quickly develops feelings. Adrien receives a ring named the Cat Miraculous, which when worn grants him the ability to transform into his superhero alias, Cat Noir (French: Chat Noir, lit. 'Black Cat', [ʃa nwaʁ]). Cat Noir and Ladybug's aim is to protect Paris and reclaim the Butterfly Miraculous from the villain Hawk Moth (French: Papillon, lit. 'Butterfly'), unaware that the latter is actually his father. As Cat Noir, Adrien's signature ability is destruction (through his Cataclysm superpower). Adrien appears in most Miraculous media, including the main series, the film, the comic books, the mobile running game, and the Roblox game.

Adrien was conceptualized as a character that would appeal to everyone, having many good characteristics and being able to inspire the viewers. Regarding Adrien's superhero identity, since Ladybug's power was connected to good luck, Astruc concluded that her partner would have powers related to bad luck, which resulted in him thinking of a black cat. Cat Noir was also inspired by the comic book superhero Catwoman. Adrien is voiced by Bryce Papenbrook in the English dub, while Benjamin Bollen voices him in the show's French version. As of Season Five, Adrien is dating his classmate, Marinette Dupain-Cheng.

Critical reception of Adrien has generally been positive, with reviewers describing him as a great, interesting, and relatable character. His relationship with Marinette has been praised, both when they are depicted as civilians and as superheroes. Adrien has served as inspiration for cosplays as many people have taken interest in him after the show was released. Merchandise inspired by him has been produced, such as action figures, accessories, and clothing items.

== Development ==
=== Concept and creation ===
Cat Noir

Adrien Agreste was conceptualized as a "modern" Prince Charming, "with many good human qualities" and "a feminine part"; Thomas Astruc, the creator of the animated television series Miraculous: Tales of Ladybug & Cat Noir, described these characteristics as "a perfect combo", adding that Adrien is "a really nice character". He also characterized Adrien as "handsome, smart, brave, but also very sensitive", and as someone that "everybody would naturally fall in love with". When asked how Adrien and Marinette Dupain-Cheng had been developed, Astruc commented that he had wanted to "present sunny characters who could inspire people all around the world in this new century".

Astruc stated that since ladybugs are associated with good luck, he had decided that Ladybug's partner would have powers connected to bad luck, and as a result he had thought of a black cat. The creation of Cat Noir (French: Chat Noir, lit. 'Black Cat') was also a tribute to Catwoman. Astruc commented that Cat Noir's civilian identity had initially been a character named Félix, describing him as "an early love interest for Marinette" who would have had a distant attitude toward her and would have been included in the "typical cold-and-snobbish-guy anime trope". He said that while the difference between Félix and Cat Noir's personalities would have worked positively, it would not have provided very good narratives in the long term. Because of this, Félix was replaced with Adrien. Astruc stated that Cat Noir is one of the two most "powerful teenagers" alongside Ladybug since he has the power of destruction. The idea related to the duo of the black cat and the ladybug was also inspired by one of Astruc's previous romantic relationships. Astruc said that managing the situation created by Cat Noir's two identities alongside Ladybug's two selves in terms of romance was "a lot of fun". He stated that pairs of superheroes like the one Cat Noir forms with Ladybug are rare in television series, adding that people enjoy the love game between the two characters. Astruc commented that a romantic relationship between Adrien and Marinette would be fragile and intricate as long as there was a villain in the series; he said that such a relationship would need to be handled carefully and would be able to happen only under certain circumstances.

Cat Noir's chibi form appearing in the series Miraculous Chibi was created by character designer Angie Nasca while the show "was still in the development phase"; according to Nasca, "the series grew from those initial sketches" portraying the two lead characters.

Jeremy Zag, the producer of Miraculous, stated that the love situation Adrien created alongside Marinette, their superhero alter egos, and their secrets are some of the main parts of the show. Sébastien Thibaudeau, the writing director of Miraculous, mentioned that Adrien frequently makes him emotional because of his difficult life. He said Cat Noir is the character that brings humor into the story, contrasting with Ladybug, who is more serious. Thibaudeau stated that Adrien can express himself when he is transformed into Cat Noir. Fred Lenoir, a writer of the series, commented that Adrien's relationship with Marinette, depicted as both civilians and superheroes, and the misunderstanding resulted from it represent the central part of the story. André Lake Mayer, ZAG America's president of global consumer products, stated that Cat Noir is one of children's preferred "relatable heroes"; she felt that the fans would "love taking on" Cat Noir's persona in the Miraculous mobile running game. Nicole D'Andria, who contributed to the writing of a Miraculous comic book, described Cat Noir as a "fantastic" character "that everyone can look up to". Giulia Adragna, the creator of an Italian Miraculous comic book series, said that she had liked Cat Noir the most after seeing images from the series for the first time, commending that he looked like a male version of Catwoman. Adragna stated that Adrien, both in his superhero form and as his civilian self, is her favorite Miraculous character. She commented that while Adrien could have been a typically unlikable character since he comes from a fine family and is a model, he instead is depicted as innocent, caring, and kind.

=== Voice ===
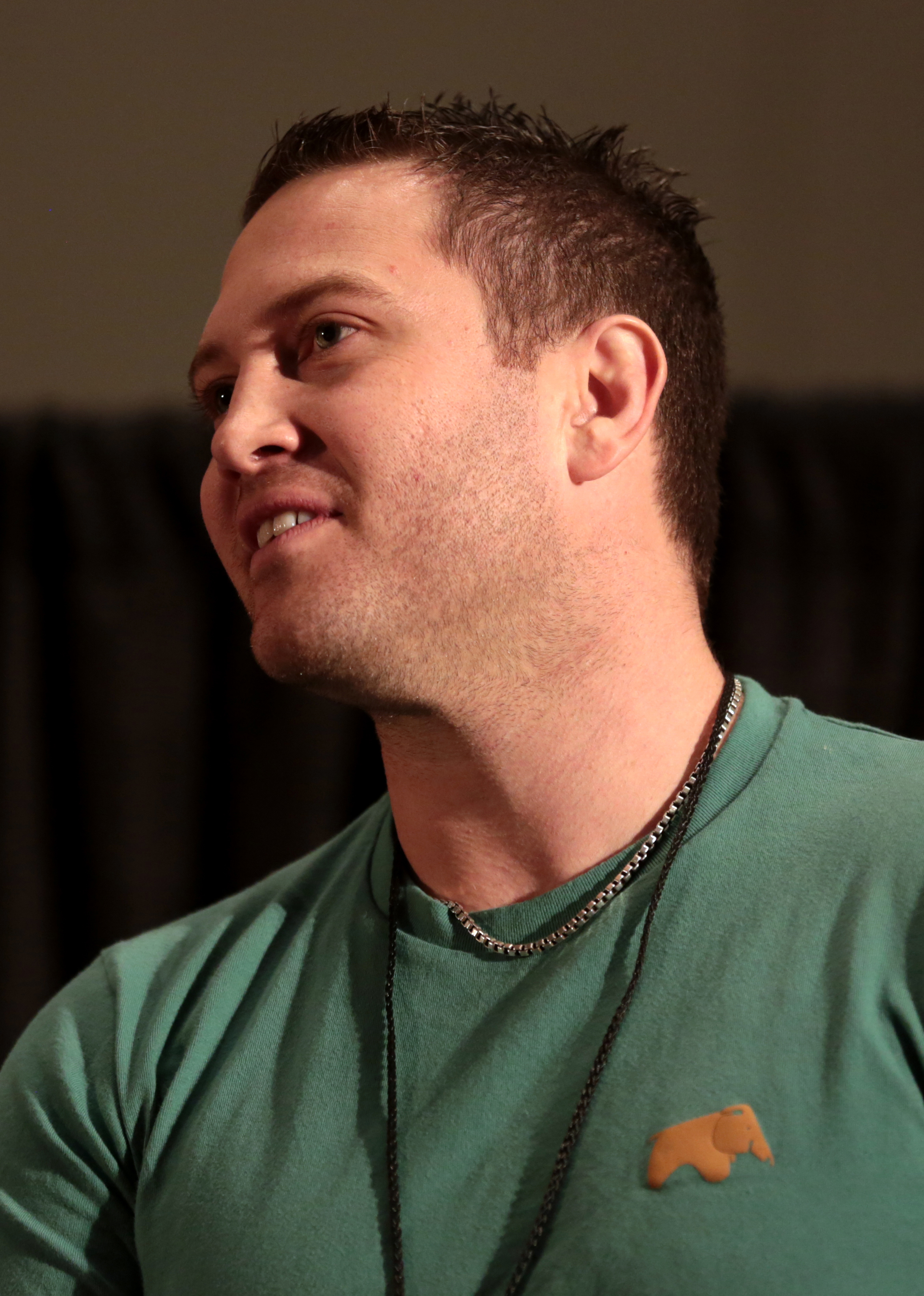
Bryce Papenbrook voices Adrien in the show's English dub.

Bryce Papenbrook voices Adrien in the English dub of the series. Papenbrook said that it is "always great to be Cat Noir", stating that he had "so much fun" with him. He described Miraculous as "a great show" with "fun animation and a lot of puns". He felt that the show's English dub contains the most puns out of all versions of the series. Papenbrook stated that he enjoys "making those cheesy puns", and he commented that he was "sneaking as many cat puns as possible into the show", feeling that the viewers like them. Papenbrook said he loves Miraculous, mentioning that he knew "a ton of people [had] been waiting for that show". He described the second season of the series as "really, really good". He stated that he was "very excited" since Miraculous had won a Teen Choice Award. Papenbrook commented that he was "excited to see more bad guys" in the next seasons of the series, stating that the writers are "creative" with the people depicted in the show. He felt that the Miraculous Chibi series is "exciting" and "looks really cool".

When the casting for the show began, many voice actors auditioned for the roles of the main characters, including Adrien's. Ezra Weisz, the voice director of Miraculous, said the staff responsible for the casting had wanted Adrien's voice to sound young and to denote self-assurance in his superhero form without making him seem overly proud; he further commented that the staff had wished to find an actor whose voice could separate Adrien's civilian self from his superhero identity. According to Weisz, he and Papenbrook had known each other for a long time. When the staff was trying to find a fitting voice for Adrien, Weisz felt that Papenbrook would be very suited for it. He stated that Papenbrook's voice sounds "the right age", adding that he has "the right acting abilities" for this role and "is very, very skilled in the booth". Weisz said that Papenbrook does "a phenomenal job" on voicing Adrien.

Jared Wolfson, the executive producer of Miraculous, commented that Papenbrook has a lot of "energy" and characterized him as "a great guy". He further described him as "very happy", "personable", and "energetic", stating that Papenbrook "loves what he does" and is "very passionate" about "being Adrien and Cat Noir". Cristina Vee, the voice actress of Marinette, felt that Papenbrook is "one of the nicest people", characterizing him as "never down" and "really positive". She also described him as "a really talented actor" and enjoyed working alongside him.

Papenbrook reprised his role as Adrien for Ladybug & Cat Noir: The Movie (2023).

Benjamin Bollen voices Adrien in the French version of the show. Thomas Astruc characterized the French cast of the series, including Bollen, as fantastic.

== Appearances ==
=== In the main series ===
Adrien is the main male protagonist of the Miraculous series. He is depicted as a French teenage student living in Paris, coming from a wealthy family. He is the son of Emilie and Gabriel Agreste. His father is a renowned fashion designer for whom Adrien works as a model, which grants him popularity. Meanwhile, his mother has disappeared. Adrien is taken care of by Gabriel's assistant, Nathalie Sancoeur, and he has a bodyguard as well. Adrien also has a maternal aunt named Amelie and a maternal cousin called Félix. Even though he has been homeschooled for most of his life, one day Adrien decides to start attending school because he wants to meet people, make friends, and be like everyone else. While heading toward its entrance, he notices an elderly man in need of assistance and offers to help him. Unknown to Adrien at the time, the man is Master Fu, the guardian of the magical objects named the Miraculouses, and this has been just a test to show who would deserve to become a superhero. Because of Adrien's kind gesture, Master Fu decides to give him a ring called the Cat Miraculous. After realizing he is in possession of the box that contains the ring, Adrien opens it and suddenly a black cat-like creature who presents himself as Plagg appears; he is a magical being known as a kwami. When wearing the ring, Adrien can transform into a superhero with the help of Plagg's powers.

Adrien is eager to transform and immediately does so. His superhero outfit derives from Plagg's appearance, representing a black cat. Not long after he transforms for the first time, he meets his new superhero partner, Ladybug, with whom he rapidly falls in love. During their first meeting, Adrien introduces his superhero alias, Cat Noir. Unknown to him, Ladybug is Marinette Dupain-Cheng, one of Adrien's classmates who has a big crush on him. At the same time, Adrien only has feelings for Ladybug, while Marinette as Ladybug does not appreciate Cat Noir's advances toward her. Cat Noir and Ladybug's purpose is to protect Paris from an evil supervillain known as Hawk Moth, who can transform people into supervillains. Hawk Moth wishes to obtain Cat Noir's and Ladybug's Miraculouses, and he is actually Adrien's father without them being aware of this. When he is Cat Noir, Adrien becomes more uninhibited and flirtatious compared to his self-restrained and modest usual personality, and he makes a lot of cat-themed puns. This transformation grants him new abilities. Cat Noir's signature power is destruction, called "Cataclysm". His superhero weapon is an extendable staff.

Adrien has a very distant relationship with his father, and he acts in a way that meets his father's expectations despite not being able to express himself because of this. He has a varying relationship with Plagg, but the two of them care about each other. Adrien has a generally positive relationship with his classmates, especially with Nino Lahiffe, his best friend. He also has a close relationship with Kagami Tsurugi, one of the students from the fencing lessons that he attends. Adrien has a childhood friend, Chloé Bourgeois, of whose usual behavior he does not approve because of her rudeness toward others.

In the fifth season of the series, Adrien and Marinette's feelings for each other, as well as their relationship, become clearer, leading to the two of them beginning to date. Gabriel, disapproving of their relationship, sends Adrien to London to attend a private school, much to his sadness. After his father's demise, Adrien returns to Paris to be with Marinette and resumes his duties as Cat Noir.

In the sixth season, as shown in the special Miraculous World London, after learning of his father's death sacrificing himself to end Monarch's threat for good from Ladybug, Adrien is angry and devastated. Nathalie becomes his parental guardian and surrogate mother due to Adrien having lost both his mother and father now, while Amelie is still in London with Felix. He is able to meet his paternal and maternal grandparents in Johnny and Gabrielle Grassette and Lord Emil and Lady Milly Graham de Vanily, and convinces them to allow him to stay in Paris with Nathalie, Marinette, and all his friends. As Cat Noir, he helps Ladybug with encouraging the team to unlock their adult Miraculous powers, before Ladybug dubs the team "The Miraculers", and continues to fight against the akumatized champions of the new Butterfly Miraculous holder that succeeded Monarch. Many residents of Paris offer their condolences to Adrien over his father's death, but when one resident takes his praise of Gabriel too far, Adrien uses the opportunity to finally vent his pent-up anger towards his father for the abuse he put up with before his death and why his dad changed from the one he remembered when he was younger who still loved him deeply then to the heartless, emotionless statue he was before he sacrificed himself to rid the world of Monarch forever. After falling for a ploy by the school bullies Ray, Loic, and Nelson to break up him and Marinette, when he discovers the truth, he is too late to save Marinette from being akumatized into "Heartfixer", but is able to grab her into a hug, explain what happened, apologize, and beg for her forgiveness, convincing her to break free and return to normal, restoring their relationship. Later, he attempts to make a documentary about his father, and speaks to Nathalie, Tomoe, and his aunt Amelie for what they knew of the good in Gabriel, even asking to speak to Ladybug about what she knew during Gabriel's final moments. This later convinces him to turn part of his mansion into a museum for his father, since he now had some closure, but unknown to him, Marinette, consumed with guilt over lying to him, decides she'll have to break up with him if she can't bring herself to tell him the truth and continues to lie to him to protect his relationship.

The following season takes a darker turn for his life as unbeknownst to him, Chrysalis begins suspecting he is Cat Noir. Soon, she reveals herself to him and decides to test her theory by revealing to him that Gabriel is Monarch. However, Cat Noir doesn't believe her as he still trusts Ladybug. Unfortunately, she as Marinette ultimately breaks up with him, claiming she doesn't love him anymore, when in reality, she couldn't keep a relationship with him when she lied to him about his father. This left both heartbroken and he temporarily gives up his Miraculous as he predicts his later akumatization into "Extinguisher". But, he rejects the akumatization when Chrysalis asks him if he was Cat Noir. He later moves on from Marinette and gets himself a newer look.

=== In other Miraculous media ===
Outside the main series, Adrien is present in most Miraculous media. He appears in the Christmas special episode, which consists of a musical format; in this episode, he spends his first Christmas without his mother. Adrien is present in the special episode that takes place in New York City, in the special episode set in Shanghai, and in the special episode taking place in Paris as well. Adrien can also be seen in the series of webisodes, including in Miraculous Secrets, in Tales from Paris, in Miraculous Chibi, and in Miraculous: Action. He is part of a video clip meant to encourage proper hygiene among children. Adrien has appeared under his superhero identity in several sequences where he has addressed the viewers in a direct manner.

Adrien is present in comic books based on the show; he also appears in other types of books inspired by the series. He is depicted in the official magazine of the series as well. Adrien is a playable character in the Miraculous mobile running game, and he has also served as an inspiration for the Roblox game based on Miraculous. He has been portrayed in live stage shows, including one that has gone on tour. Adrien was set to be featured in a 2D OVA.

Adrien had been announced to appear in a Miraculous live action film, but the film was subsequently changed to an animated musical film, which was originally titled Ladybug & Cat Noir Awakening before being renamed to Ladybug & Cat Noir: The Movie.

== Reception ==
=== Critical response ===
Adrien's character has received a generally positive critical response, with writers characterizing him as an "iconic", "great", beautiful, "relatable", and "beyond famous" character. ComicsVerse's Michele Kirichanskaya said that Adrien's "character is essential to the overall charm captured by the show". She praised that Cat Noir had been inspired by an existent superhero, Catwoman. Kirichanskaya stated that Cat Noir had been created following the "superhero logic", on account of which heroes wearing masks "must combat superpowered foes". She wrote that because of Cat Noir's "transformation scene", the "Magical Girl trope" present in the story is "not limited by gender". Robert Lloyd of Los Angeles Times characterized Adrien as "an unspoiled rich kid who moonlights as a model". He stated that "the male hero wears a catsuit, cat ears and a sort of tail", which "may seem a surprisingly foreign and/or feminine touch" to the American audience. Le Figaro's Damien Mercereau described Adrien as a sensitive and unassuming character, commenting that he becomes resourceful and self-assured as Cat Noir. ComicsAlliance writer Elle Collins praised that Cat Noir's costume "makes him look like Selina Kyle's boy sidekick". She said many people have "the false belief that superheroes are for boys", deeming it predictable that Cat Noir was publicized as Ladybug's "equal co-star of the show" although the initial title of the series had highlighted "the female character as the real star, with Cat Noir as her fellow costumed hero and possible love interest". Collins stated that she was "interested to see" whether Cat Noir had "a Magical Girl transformation" similar to Ladybug's. Emily Ashby of Common Sense Media characterized Adrien in his civilian form as a normal child "facing typical tween troubles", such as "keeping up with school, making friends, and dealing with difficult peers". Comic Book Resources writer Nathan Dodge described Cat Noir as "a stylish cat-themed hero". Emily Auten of Nerd Much? praised Bryce Papenbrook's voice acting, stating that Adrien's voice is done "especially well" along with Marinette's and viewing this as "definitely a plus since the entire plot focuses on them". She said that Adrien's character is "very interesting", "especially in contrast with" his superhero identity, and wrote that Adrien is a "great" choice for a protagonist "even without the romantic subplot". Auten characterized Cat Noir as one of the "best" parts of the series, and she stated that his "lengthy transformation" sequence never seems overly extended and is "fun to see". An El Intransigente writer said Adrien's character shows that money does not buy happiness. Adrien was commented to "teach kids about confidence", and he was regarded as "cute and fun to watch". He was deemed "mild-mannered", and "shy". Cat Noir was described as loyal. When an episode depicted him in a stadium, Cat Noir was stated to win alongside Ladybug against his opponent as easily as the professional football club Paris Saint-Germain F.C. did in the Ligue 1 French championship.

Adrien's relationship with Marinette has been praised, both as civilians and as superheroes. Cat Noir's interactions with Ladybug have been commended, being regarded as "absolutely adorable to watch". Michele Kirichanskaya characterized Adrien as Marinette's "crime-fighting partner" and described the "dynamics" between the two of them as "captivating". She said Adrien's "romantic dynamic" with Marinette "contributes much" to the show's "drama and comedy", adding that the series "creates a love quadrangle by only using two individuals". Emily Ashby stated that Cat Noir makes "a charming crime-fighting duo" with Ladybug and said "their relationship easily eclipses the show's action in entertainment value". She felt that watching Adrien's relationship with Marinette evolve is "fun". Ashby stated that the viewers "have to forgive the characters' naivety" and accept "that merely an eye mask and some cat ears" prevent Adrien and Marinette from recognizing one another. She said that Cat Noir's crush on Ladybug "is a sweet example of young love". María Merino of Okdiario commented that Adrien's relationship with Marinette is one of the factors that attract viewers to this series. Emily Auten thought that the "romantic subplot" is made "even more interesting" by Cat Noir's crush on Ladybug, with "the chemistry between both of them being one of the many highlights" in the show. She wrote that Cat Noir forms alongside Ladybug "one of the best duos" she had ever seen in a cartoon. The love situation Adrien created alongside Marinette was stated to bring "a fun dynamic" into the series, and was regarded as sweet; it was described as one of the "old clichés on the genre", and was viewed as similar to "the classic Clark-Lois-Superman triangle".

=== Popularity and merchandise ===
Paul Marciano, the chairman and chief creative officer of Guess, said that the viewers' understanding of Adrien's relationship with Marinette and their superhero alter egos make this series "intriguing". A life-size wax statue portraying Cat Noir has been displayed at the Musée Grévin. He has been depicted on buses and billboards. A Snapchat filter inspired by Cat Noir has been developed. Cosplays of Adrien have been created, both as his civilian self, and under his superhero identity. Meet-and-greet sessions containing Cat Noir have taken place, including at a theme park. He has served as inspiration for face painting, for indoor playgrounds, and for a Christmas event.

Several pieces of merchandise based on Adrien's civilian and superhero forms have been produced, such as action figures. Toys inspired by him have been created, including Kinder Surprise toys. Figurines portraying Cat Noir have been launched by Burger King, and by Funko. McDonald's has released Happy Meals inspired by Adrien. Danone products depicting Cat Noir have been developed. Clothing items and accessories based on Adrien have been created. Stickers inspired by him have been produced. Masks based on Cat Noir have been released. Items depicting Cat Noir alongside Ladybug have been launched, such as school-related items, and beach-related items. Sweets inspired by him have been invented, including Pez candy dispensers. A game based on Cat Noir and other Miraculous characters has been developed. Other products inspired by him have also been created.
