= List of Miraculous: Tales of Ladybug & Cat Noir episodes =

The logo for Miraculous

Miraculous: Tales of Ladybug & Cat Noir is a French CGI action/adventure animated series produced by ZAG Entertainment and Method Animation (later their joint venture Miraculous Corp.), in co-production with Toei Animation, SAMG Animation, and De Agostini Editore, as well as several international companies. It features two Parisian teenagers, Marinette Dupain-Cheng and Adrien Agreste, who transform into the superheroes Ladybug and Cat Noir, respectively, alongside several other superheroes, to protect the city from supervillains, created by the main supervillain Hawk Moth (renamed Shadow Moth in season 4 and Monarch in season 5) and later on, Chrysalis. It airs in about 150 countries, each with its own episode order.

Prior to its debut in France in October 2015 on TF1, the series was first shown in South Korea in September 2015 on EBS1. In the US, the series debuted on Nickelodeon in December 2015, before it was removed from the network's schedule in 2016. In April 2019, the series was picked up by Disney Channel. It also aired on the KidsClick programming block until its shutdown in March 2019.

In December 2016, Zag announced that Netflix had acquired USA video-on-demand streaming rights to Miraculous for seasons 1–3. The second season premiered in France on TF1's TFOU block in October 2017, and on other channels throughout Europe. The world premiere of Season 3 was on the Disney Channel in Spain and Portugal in December 2018. In September 2019, it was confirmed by Zag that the air date for season 4 was slated for late 2020, but this was pushed to 2021 due to the COVID-19 pandemic. The fourth season premiere, "Furious Fu", was aired in Brazil on Gloob in March 2021. In France, the fourth season premiered in April 2021 and on Disney Channel US in June 2021. In April 2021, it was announced that seasons 6 and 7 were in production. In July 2022, an eighth season was greenlit. On 6 January 2025, it was announced that the sixth season would premiere on Disney Channel and Disney XD US on 25 January 2025, while it would premiere in France on 23 March 2025.

== Series overview ==
Series	Episodes	Originally released	
Series	Episodes	First released	Last released
1	26	19 October 2015	30 October 2016
2	26	11 December 2016	18 November 2018
3	26	14 April 2019	8 December 2019
4	26	11 April 2021	13 March 2022
5	27	17 October 2022	1 November 2023
6	26	23 March 2025	11 October 2026
7	26	1 November 2026	TBA

== Episodes ==
=== Season 1 (2015–16) ===
No. overall	No. in season	English title French title	Directed by	Written by	Original air date (France)	U.S. air date	Prod. code	U.S. viewers (millions)
1	1	"Stormy Weather" "Climatika"	Thomas Astruc	Fred Lenoir	19 October 2015	20 December 2015	101	1.47
2	2	"The Bubbler" "Le Bulleur"	Thomas Astruc	Thomas Astruc; Sébastien Thibaudeau	20 October 2015	6 December 2015	109	1.40
3	3	"The Pharaoh" "Le Pharaon"	Thomas Astruc	Cédric Bacconnier	21 October 2015	10 January 2016	115	1.11
4	4	"Lady Wifi"	Thomas Astruc	Sébastien Thibaudeau	22 October 2015	17 January 2016	103	1.43
5	5	"Timebreaker" "Chronogirl"	Thomas Astruc	Sébastien Thibaudeau; Michaël Delachenal	23 October 2015	27 December 2015	116	1.17
6	6	"Mr. Pigeon" "M. Pigeon"	Thomas Astruc	Guillaume Mautalent; Sébastien Oursel	23 October 2015	13 December 2015	106	1.09
7	7	"The Evillustrator" "Le Dessinateur"	Thomas Astruc	Matthieu Choquet	26 October 2015	24 January 2016	102	1.18
8	8	"Rogercop"	Thomas Astruc	Denis Bardiau	27 October 2015	31 January 2016	111	1.18
9	9	"Copycat" "L'Imposteur"	Thomas Astruc	Sébastien Thibaudeau; Pascal Boutboul	28 October 2015	3 January 2016	108	1.29
10	10	"Dark Cupid" "Dislocœur"	Thomas Astruc	Régis Jaulin	29 October 2015	7 February 2016	105	1.27
11	11	"Horrificator"	Thomas Astruc	Fred Lenoir	30 October 2015	21 February 2016	117	1.13
12	12	"Darkblade" "Le Chevalier Noir"	Thomas Astruc	Matthieu Choquet; Léonie de Rudder	6 December 2015	28 February 2016	114	1.06
13	13	"The Mime" "Le Mime"	Thomas Astruc	Thomas Astruc; François Charpiat; Michaël Delachenal; Karine Lollichon; Sébastien Thibaudeau	13 December 2015	7 May 2016	119	1.13
14	14	"Kung Food"	Thomas Astruc	Matthieu Choquet; Fred Lenoir	10 January 2016	10 September 2016	125	0.93
15	15	"Gamer" "Le Gamer"	Thomas Astruc	Guillaume Mautalent; Sébastien Oursel	17 January 2016	24 September 2016	112	1.19
16	16	"Animan"	Thomas Astruc	Cédric Perrin; Jean-Christophe Hervé	24 January 2016	13 August 2016	113	1.18
17	17	"Antibug"	Thomas Astruc	Sébastien Thibaudeau	31 January 2016	15 October 2016	124	0.96
18	18	"The Puppeteer" "La Marionnettiste"	Thomas Astruc	Sébastien Thibaudeau	7 February 2016	8 October 2016	118	0.99
19	19	"Reflekta"	Thomas Astruc	Sophie Lodwitz; Eve Pisler	21 February 2016	1 October 2016	121	0.91
20	20	"Guitar Villain" "Guitar Vilain"	Thomas Astruc	Sébastien Thibaudeau	28 February 2016	3 September 2016	120	1.01
21	21	"Pixelator" "Numéric"	Thomas Astruc	Guillaume Mautalent; Sébastien Oursel	13 March 2016	27 August 2016	107	1.13
22	22	"Princess Fragrance" "Princesse Fragrance"	Thomas Astruc	Matthieu Choquet; Léonie De Rudder	20 March 2016	14 May 2016	104	1.11
23	23	"Simon Says" "Jackady"	Thomas Astruc	Fred Lenoir	27 March 2016	20 August 2016	110	0.86
24	24	"Volpina"	Thomas Astruc	Matthieu Choquet; Léonie de Rudder	3 April 2016	22 October 2016	126	0.96
25	25	"Ladybug & Cat Noir – Origins, Part 1" "Ladybug et Chat Noir (Origines – Partie 1)"	Thomas Astruc	Thomas Astruc; Quentin; Sébastien Thibaudeau	30 October 2016	6 August 2016	122	0.97
26	26	"Stoneheart – Origins, Part 2" "Cœur de pierre (Origines – Partie 2)"	Thomas Astruc	Thomas Astruc; Quentin; Sébastien Thibaudeau	30 October 2016	6 August 2016	123	0.97

=== Season 2 (2016–18) ===
No. overall	No. in season	English title French title	Directed by	Written by	Original air date (France)	U.S. release date	Prod. code
27	1	"A Christmas Special / Santa Claws" "Pire Noël"	Thomas Astruc	Story by : Jeremy Zag; Teleplay by : Thomas Astruc, Fred Lenoir & Sébastien Thibaudeau	11 December 2016	20 December 2016	226
28	2	"The Collector" "Le Collectionneur"	Thomas Astruc; Wilfried Pain	Thomas Astruc; Matthieu Choquet; Fred Lenoir; Sébastien Thibaudeau	26 October 2017	30 March 2018	201
29	3	"Despair Bear" "Doudou Vilain"	Thomas Astruc; Jun Violet	Thomas Astruc; Matthieu Choquet; Fred Lenoir; Nolwenn Pierre; Sébastien Thibaudeau	27 October 2017	30 March 2018	204
30	4	"Prime Queen" "Audimatrix"	Thomas Astruc; Christelle Abgrall	Thomas Astruc; Matthieu Choquet; Fred Lenoir; Sébastien Thibaudeau	29 October 2017	30 March 2018	202
31	5	"Befana" "La Béfana"	Thomas Astruc; Benoît Boucher	Thomas Astruc; Mélanie Duval; Sébastien Thibaudeau	30 October 2017	30 March 2018	208
32	6	"Riposte"	Thomas Astruc; Jun Violet	Thomas Astruc; Matthieu Choquet; Fred Lenoir; Sébastien Thibaudeau	1 November 2017	30 March 2018	207
33	7	"Robostus"	Thomas Astruc; Wilfried Pain	Thomas Astruc; Matthieu Choquet; Fred Lenoir; Sébastien Thibaudeau	3 November 2017	30 March 2018	211
34	8	"Gigantitan"	Thomas Astruc; Christelle Abgrall	Thomas Astruc; Matthieu Choquet; Fred Lenoir; Sébastien Thibaudeau	26 November 2017	30 March 2018	206
35	9	"The Dark Owl" "Le Hibou Noir"	Thomas Astruc; Jun Violet	Thomas Astruc; Matthieu Choquet; Fred Lenoir; Sébastien Thibaudeau	10 December 2017	30 March 2018	213
36	10	"Glaciator"	Thomas Astruc; Wilfried Pain	Thomas Astruc; Matthieu Choquet; Fred Lenoir; Sébastien Thibaudeau	14 January 2018	30 March 2018	203
37	11	"Sapotis"	Thomas Astruc; Jun Violet	Thomas Astruc; Matthieu Choquet; Fred Lenoir; Sébastien Thibaudeau	21 January 2018	30 March 2018	212
38	12	"Gorizilla"	Thomas Astruc; Benoît Boucher	Thomas Astruc; Matthieu Choquet; Mélanie Duval; Sébastien Thibaudeau	13 May 2018	30 March 2018	210
39	13	"Captain Hardrock" "Capitaine Hardrock"	Thomas Astruc; Wilfried Pain	Thomas Astruc; Fred Lenoir; Jean-Remi Perrin; Sébastien Thibaudeau	20 May 2018	30 March 2018	216
40	14	"Zombizou"	Thomas Astruc; Wilfried Pain	Thomas Astruc; Wilfried Pain	27 May 2018	14 December 2018	215
41	15	"Syren"	Thomas Astruc; Benoît Boucher	Thomas Astruc; Mélanie Duval; Fred Lenoir; Sébastien Thibaudeau	3 June 2018	14 December 2018	214
42	16	"Frightningale" "Rossignoble"	Thomas Astruc; Christelle Abgrall; Jeremy Paoletti	Thomas Astruc; Matthieu Choquet; Fred Lenoir; Sébastien Thibaudeau	10 June 2018	27 September 2018 (KidsClick) 14 December 2018 (Netflix)	209
43	17	"Troublemaker" "L'insaisissable"	Thomas Astruc; Wilfried Pain	Thomas Astruc; Matthieu Choquet; Fred Lenoir; Nolwenn Pierre; Sébastien Thibaudeau	17 June 2018	13 September 2018 (KidsClick) 14 December 2018 (Netflix)	205
44	18	"Anansi"	Thomas Astruc; Benoît Boucher	Thomas Astruc; Mélanie Duval; Fred Lenoir; Sébastien Thibaudeau	23 September 2018	14 December 2018	221
45	19	"Sandboy" "Le Marchand de Sable"	Thomas Astruc; Jun Violet	Thomas Astruc; Mélanie Duval; Fred Lenoir; Sébastien Thibaudeau	30 September 2018	14 December 2018	223
46	20	"Reverser" "Inverso"	Thomas Astruc; Benoît Boucher	Thomas Astruc & Fred Lenoir	7 October 2018	14 December 2018	220
47	21	"Frozer" "Le Patineur"	Thomas Astruc; Jeremy Paoletti	Thomas Astruc; Mélanie Duval; Fred Lenoir; Sébastien Thibaudeau	14 October 2018	14 December 2018	217
48	22	"Style Queen (Queen's battle – Part 1)" "Style Queen (Le combat des Reines – Partie 1)"	Thomas Astruc; Jun Violet	Thomas Astruc; Matthieu Choquet; Fred Lenoir; Sébastien Thibaudeau	21 October 2018	14 December 2018	218
49	23	"Queen Wasp (Queen's battle – Part 2)" "Queen Wasp (Le combat des Reines – Partie 2)"	Thomas Astruc; Wilfried Pain	Thomas Astruc; Matthieu Choquet; Fred Lenoir; Sébastien Thibaudeau	21 October 2018	14 December 2018	219
50	24	"Malediktator" "Maledikteur"	Thomas Astruc; Benoît Boucher	Thomas Astruc; Matthieu Choquet; Fred Lenoir; Sébastien Thibaudeau	28 October 2018	14 December 2018	222
51	25	"Catalyst (Heroes' Day – Part 1)" "Catalyste (Le jour des Héros – partie 1)"	Thomas Astruc; Jun Violet; Jeremy Paoletti	Thomas Astruc; Matthieu Choquet; Mélanie Duval; Fred Lenoir; Sébastien Thibaudeau	18 November 2018	14 December 2018	224
52	26	"Mayura (Heroes' Day – Part 2)" "Mayura (Le jour des Héros – partie 2)"	Thomas Astruc; Benoît Boucher; Jun Violet	Thomas Astruc; Matthieu Choquet; Mélanie Duval; Fred Lenoir; Sébastien Thibaudeau	18 November 2018	14 December 2018	225

=== Season 3 (2019) ===
No. overall	No. in season	English title French title	Directed by	Written by	Original air date (France)	U.S. release date	Prod. code
53	1	"Backwarder" "Rebrousse-Temps"	Thomas Astruc; Jun Violet; Benoît Boucher	Thomas Astruc; Fred Lenoir; Sébastien Thibaudeau	14 April 2019	1 August 2019	304
54	2	"Weredad" "Papa Garou"	Thomas Astruc; Jun Violet; Lucie Gardes	Thomas Astruc; Mélanie Duval; Fred Lenoir; Sébastien Thibaudeau	21 April 2019	1 August 2019	306
55	3	"Chameleon" "Caméléon"	Thomas Astruc; Wilfried Pain; Jun Violet	Thomas Astruc; Mélanie Duval; Fred Lenoir; Sébastien Thibaudeau	28 April 2019	1 August 2019	301
56	4	"Animaestro"	Thomas Astruc; Jun Violet	Thomas Astruc; Mélanie Duval; Sébastien Thibaudeau	5 May 2019	1 August 2019	302
57	5	"Bakerix" "Boulangerix"	Thomas Astruc; Jun Violet	Thomas Astruc; Fred Lenoir; Sébastien Thibaudeau	12 May 2019	1 August 2019	303
58	6	"Silencer" "Silence"	Thomas Astruc; Jun Violet	Thomas Astruc; Mélanie Duval; Fred Lenoir; Sébastien Thibaudeau	19 May 2019	1 August 2019	307
59	7	"Oblivio"	Thomas Astruc; Wilfried Pain; Nicolas Hess	Thomas Astruc; Mélanie Duval; Jean-Rémi Perrin; Sébastien Thibaudeau	26 May 2019	1 August 2019	310
60	8	"Stormy Weather 2" "Climatika 2"	Thomas Astruc; Wilfried Pain	Thomas Astruc; Mélanie Duval; Fred Lenoir; Sébastien Thibaudeau	2 June 2019	1 February 2020	317
61	9	"Reflekdoll" "Poupéflekta"	Thomas Astruc; Jun Violet; Joanna Celse	Thomas Astruc; Mélanie Duval; Fred Lenoir; Sébastien Thibaudeau	21 October 2019	1 February 2020	305
62	10	"Oni-Chan"	Thomas Astruc; Jun Violet	Thomas Astruc; Mélanie Duval; Fred Lenoir; Sébastien Thibaudeau	21 October 2019	1 August 2019	308
63	11	"Miraculer" "Miraculeur"	Thomas Astruc; Jun Violet; Christophe Yoshida	Thomas Astruc; Matthieu Choquet; Mélanie Duval; Sébastien Thibaudeau	22 October 2019	1 August 2019	309
64	12	"The Puppeteer 2" "La Marionnettiste 2"	Thomas Astruc; Jun Violet	Thomas Astruc; Mélanie Duval; Fred Lenoir; Sébastien Thibaudeau	23 October 2019	1 August 2019	321
65	13	"Desperada"	Thomas Astruc; Wilfried Pain	Thomas Astruc; Mélanie Duval; Wilfried Pain; Sébastien Thibaudeau	24 October 2019	1 February 2020	311
66	14	"Startrain"	Thomas Astruc; Wilfried Pain; Christophe Yoshida	Thomas Astruc; Mélanie Duval; Fred Lenoir; Sébastien Thibaudeau	25 October 2019	1 February 2020	313
67	15	"Kwamibuster" "Chasseuse de Kwamis"	Thomas Astruc; Wilfried Pain; Charles Schnek	Thomas Astruc; Mélanie Duval; Fred Lenoir; Sébastien Thibaudeau	27 October 2019	1 February 2020	314
68	16	"Feast" "Festin"	Thomas Astruc; Wilfried Pain	Thomas Astruc; Fred Lenoir; Sébastien Thibaudeau	28 October 2019	1 February 2020	315
69	17	"Ikari Gozen"	Thomas Astruc; Jun Violet; Cyril Adam	Thomas Astruc; Mélanie Duval; Fred Lenoir; Sébastien Thibaudeau	29 October 2019	1 February 2020	318
70	18	"Timetagger"	Thomas Astruc; Jun Violet; Cyril Adam	Thomas Astruc; Mélanie Duval; Fred Lenoir; Sébastien Thibaudeau	30 October 2019	1 February 2020	319
71	19	"Party Crasher" "Trouble Fête"	Thomas Astruc; Wilfried Pain; Nicolas Hess	Thomas Astruc; Mélanie Duval; Fred Lenoir; Sébastien Thibaudeau	31 October 2019	1 August 2019	320
72	20	"Gamer 2.0"	Thomas Astruc; Wilfried Pain; Manon Serda	Thomas Astruc; Mélanie Duval; Sébastien Thibaudeau; Fred Lenoir	3 November 2019	1 August 2019	316
73	21	"Cat Blanc" "Chat Blanc"	Thomas Astruc	Thomas Astruc; Mélanie Duval; Fred Lenoir; Sébastien Thibaudeau	10 November 2019	1 February 2020	322
74	22	"Félix"	Thomas Astruc	Thomas Astruc; Mélanie Duval; Fred Lenoir; Sébastien Thibaudeau	17 November 2019	1 February 2020	323
75	23	"Ladybug"	Thomas Astruc; Wilfried Pain; Isabelle Lemaux	Thomas Astruc; Mélanie Duval; Fred Lenoir; Sébastien Thibaudeau	24 November 2019	1 February 2020	324
76	24	"Christmaster" (Note: This episode was presented as Chris Master. But according to Thomas Astruc, the correct English name is Christmaster.) "Maître Noël"	Thomas Astruc; Jun Violet; Joanna Celse	Thomas Astruc; Mélanie Duval; Fred Lenoir; Sébastien Thibaudeau	1 December 2019	1 August 2019	312
77	25	"Heart Hunter (The Battle of the Miraculous – Part 1)" "Mangeamour (La Bataille des Miraculous – Partie 1)"	Thomas Astruc; Wilfried Pain; Nicolas Hess	Thomas Astruc; Matthieu Choquet; Mélanie Duval; Fred Lenoir; Sébastien Thibaudeau	8 December 2019	1 February 2020	325
78	26	"Miracle Queen (The Battle of the Miraculous – Part 2)" "Miracle Queen (La Bataille des Miraculous – Partie 2)"	Thomas Astruc; Wilfried Pain; Jun Violet	Thomas Astruc; Matthieu Choquet; Mélanie Duval; Fred Lenoir; Sébastien Thibaudeau	8 December 2019	1 February 2020	326

=== Season 4 (2021–22) ===
No. overall	No. in season	English title French title	Directed by	Written by	Original air date (France)	U.S. air date	Prod. code	U.S. viewers (millions)
79	1	"Truth" "Vérité"	Thomas Astruc; Wilfried Pain; Jun Violet; Cyril Adam; Nicolas Hess	Thomas Astruc; Mélanie Duval; Fred Lenoir; Sébastien Thibaudeau	11 April 2021	21 June 2021	401	0.45
80	2	"Lies" "Mensonge"	Thomas Astruc; Wilfried Pain; Jun Violet; Cyril Adam; Nicolas Hess	Thomas Astruc; Mélanie Duval; Fred Lenoir; Sébastien Thibaudeau	18 April 2021	22 June 2021	402	0.40
81	3	"Gang of Secrets" "Le Gang des Secrets"	Thomas Astruc; Wilfried Pain; Jun Violet; Cyril Adam; Nicolas Hess	Thomas Astruc; Mélanie Duval; Fred Lenoir; Sébastien Thibaudeau	25 April 2021	23 June 2021	403	0.49
82	4	"Mr. Pigeon 72" "M. Pigeon 72"	Thomas Astruc; Wilfried Pain; Jun Violet; Cyril Adam; Nicolas Hess	Thomas Astruc; Mélanie Duval; Fred Lenoir; Sébastien Thibaudeau	23 May 2021	24 June 2021	404	0.52
83	5	"Furious Fu" "Fu Furieux"	Thomas Astruc; Wilfried Pain; Jun Violet; Cyril Adam; Nicolas Hess	Thomas Astruc; Mélanie Duval; Fred Lenoir; Sébastien Thibaudeau	30 May 2021	25 June 2021	406	0.48
84	6	"Sole Crusher" "Pirkell"	Thomas Astruc; Wilfried Pain; Jun Violet; Cyril Adam; Nicolas Hess	Thomas Astruc; Mélanie Duval; Fred Lenoir; Sébastien Thibaudeau	6 June 2021	26 June 2021	407	0.38
85	7	"Queen Banana"	Thomas Astruc; Wilfried Pain; Jun Violet; Cyril Adam; Nicolas Hess	Thomas Astruc; Mélanie Duval; Fred Lenoir; Sébastien Thibaudeau	13 June 2021	3 July 2021	408	0.27
86	8	"Guiltrip" "Culpabysse"	Thomas Astruc; Wilfried Pain; Jun Violet; Cyril Adam; Nicolas Hess	Thomas Astruc; Mélanie Duval; Fred Lenoir; Sébastien Thibaudeau	20 June 2021	10 July 2021	411	0.39
87	9	"Crocoduel"	Thomas Astruc; Wilfried Pain; Jun Violet; Cyril Adam; Nicolas Hess	Thomas Astruc; Mélanie Duval; Fred Lenoir; Sébastien Thibaudeau	29 August 2021	30 October 2021	412	0.33
88	10	"Optigami"	Thomas Astruc; Wilfried Pain; Jun Violet; Cyril Adam; Nicolas Hess	Thomas Astruc; Mélanie Duval; Fred Lenoir; Sébastien Thibaudeau	5 September 2021	17 July 2021	413	0.38
89	11	"Sentibubbler" "Sentibulleur"	Thomas Astruc; Wilfried Pain; Jun Violet; Cyril Adam; Nicolas Hess	Thomas Astruc; Mélanie Duval; Fred Lenoir; Sébastien Thibaudeau	12 September 2021	24 July 2021	414	0.37
90	12	"Rocketear" "Larme Ultime"	Thomas Astruc; Wilfried Pain; Jun Violet; Cyril Adam; Nicolas Hess	Thomas Astruc; Mélanie Duval; Fred Lenoir; Sébastien Thibaudeau	19 September 2021	31 July 2021	417	0.34
91	13	"Mega Leech" "Sangsure"	Thomas Astruc; Wilfried Pain; Jun Violet; Cyril Adam; Nicolas Hess	Thomas Astruc; Mélanie Duval; Fred Lenoir; Sébastien Thibaudeau	26 September 2021	14 August 2021	410	0.39
92	14	"Wishmaker" "Exauceur"	Thomas Astruc; Wilfried Pain; Jun Violet; Cyril Adam; Nicolas Hess	Thomas Astruc; Mélanie Duval; Fred Lenoir; Sébastien Thibaudeau	3 October 2021	7 August 2021	418	0.32
93	15	"Hack-San"	Thomas Astruc; Wilfried Pain; Jun Violet; Cyril Adam; Nicolas Hess	Thomas Astruc; Mélanie Duval; Fred Lenoir; Sébastien Thibaudeau	10 October 2021	13 November 2021	416	0.32
94	16	"Simpleman" "Simplificator"	Thomas Astruc; Wilfried Pain; Jun Violet; Cyril Adam; Nicolas Hess	Thomas Astruc; Mélanie Duval; Fred Lenoir; Sébastien Thibaudeau	17 October 2021	16 October 2021	419	0.38
95	17	"Glaciator 2"	Thomas Astruc; Wilfried Pain; Jun Violet; Cyril Adam; Nicolas Hess	Thomas Astruc; Mélanie Duval; Fred Lenoir; Sébastien Thibaudeau	24 October 2021	6 November 2021	415	0.40
96	18	"Dearest Family" "Chère Famille"	Thomas Astruc; Wilfried Pain; Jun Violet; Cyril Adam; Nicolas Hess	Thomas Astruc; Mélanie Duval; Fred Lenoir; Sébastien Thibaudeau	31 October 2021	23 October 2021	421	0.35
97	19	"Ephemeral" "Éphémère"	Thomas Astruc; Wilfried Pain; Jun Violet; Cyril Adam; Nicolas Hess	Thomas Astruc; Mélanie Duval; Fred Lenoir; Sébastien Thibaudeau	7 November 2021	27 November 2021	422	0.39
98	20	"Gabriel Agreste"	Thomas Astruc; Wilfried Pain; Jun Violet; Cyril Adam; Nicolas Hess	Thomas Astruc; Mélanie Duval; Fred Lenoir; Sébastien Thibaudeau	14 November 2021	20 November 2021	409	0.26
99	21	"Psycomedian" "Psycomédien"	Thomas Astruc; Wilfried Pain; Jun Violet; Cyril Adam; Nicolas Hess	Thomas Astruc; Mélanie Duval; Fred Lenoir; Sébastien Thibaudeau	13 February 2022	5 February 2022	405	0.25
100	22	"Kuro Neko"	Thomas Astruc; Wilfried Pain; Jun Violet; Cyril Adam; Nicolas Hess	Thomas Astruc; Mélanie Duval; Fred Lenoir; Sébastien Thibaudeau	20 February 2022	19 February 2022	423	0.31
101	23	"Penalteam"	Thomas Astruc; Wilfried Pain; Jun Violet; Cyril Adam; Nicolas Hess	Thomas Astruc; Mélanie Duval; Fred Lenoir; Sébastien Thibaudeau	27 February 2022	26 February 2022	424	0.30
102	24	"Qilin"	Thomas Astruc; Wilfried Pain; Jun Violet; Cyril Adam; Nicolas Hess	Thomas Astruc; Mélanie Duval; Fred Lenoir; Sébastien Thibaudeau	6 March 2022	12 February 2022	420	0.30
103	25	"Risk (Shadow Moth's Final Attack – Part 1)" "Risque (La Dernière Attaque de Papillombre – Partie 1)"	Thomas Astruc; Wilfried Pain; Jun Violet; Cyril Adam; Nicolas Hess	Thomas Astruc; Mélanie Duval; Fred Lenoir; Sébastien Thibaudeau	13 March 2022	5 March 2022	425	0.26
104	26	"Strikeback (Shadow Moth's Final Attack – Part 2)" "Réplique (La Dernière Attaque de Papillombre – Partie 2)"	Thomas Astruc; Wilfried Pain; Jun Violet; Cyril Adam; Nicolas Hess	Thomas Astruc; Mélanie Duval; Fred Lenoir; Sébastien Thibaudeau	13 March 2022	12 March 2022	426	0.24

=== Season 5 (2022–23) ===
No. overall	No. in season	English title French title	Directed by	Written by	Original air date (France)	U.S. air date	Prod. code	U.S. viewers (millions)
105	1	"Evolution" "Évolution"	Thomas Astruc; Wilfried Pain; Jun Violet; Cyril Adam; Nicolas Hess	Thomas Astruc; Mélanie Duval; Fred Lenoir; Sébastien Thibaudeau	17 October 2022	8 October 2022	501	0.21
106	2	"Multiplication"	Thomas Astruc; Wilfried Pain; Jun Violet; Cyril Adam; Nicolas Hess	Thomas Astruc; Mélanie Duval; Fred Lenoir; Sébastien Thibaudeau	25 October 2022	15 October 2022	502	0.26
107	3	"Destruction"	Thomas Astruc; Wilfried Pain; Jun Violet; Cyril Adam; Nicolas Hess	Thomas Astruc; Mélanie Duval; Fred Lenoir; Sébastien Thibaudeau	26 October 2022	22 October 2022	503	0.26
108	4	"Jubilation"	Thomas Astruc; Wilfried Pain; Jun Violet; Cyril Adam; Nicolas Hess	Thomas Astruc; Mélanie Duval; Fred Lenoir; Sébastien Thibaudeau	27 October 2022	29 October 2022	504	0.23
109	5	"Determination" "Détermination"	Thomas Astruc; Wilfried Pain; Jun Violet; Cyril Adam; Nicolas Hess	Thomas Astruc; Mélanie Duval; Fred Lenoir; Sébastien Thibaudeau	28 October 2022	12 November 2022	506	0.28
110	6	"Passion"	Thomas Astruc; Wilfried Pain; Jun Violet; Cyril Adam; Nicolas Hess	Thomas Astruc; Mélanie Duval; Fred Lenoir; Sébastien Thibaudeau	31 October 2022	19 November 2022	507	0.31
111	7	"Reunion" "Réunion"	Thomas Astruc; Wilfried Pain; Jun Violet; Cyril Adam; Nicolas Hess	Thomas Astruc; Mélanie Duval; Fred Lenoir; Sébastien Thibaudeau	1 November 2022	26 November 2022	508	0.23
112	8	"Illusion"	Thomas Astruc; Wilfried Pain; Jun Violet; Cyril Adam; Nicolas Hess	Thomas Astruc; Mélanie Duval; Fred Lenoir; Sébastien Thibaudeau	2 November 2022	5 November 2022	505	0.27
113	9	"Elation" "Exaltation"	Thomas Astruc; Wilfried Pain; Jun Violet; Cyril Adam; Nicolas Hess	Thomas Astruc; Mélanie Duval; Fred Lenoir; Sébastien Thibaudeau	3 November 2022	3 December 2022	509	0.30
114	10	"Transmission (The Kwamis' Choice – Part 1)" "Transmission (Le Choix des Kwamis – Partie 1)"	Thomas Astruc; Wilfried Pain; Jun Violet; Cyril Adam; Nicolas Hess	Thomas Astruc; Mélanie Duval; Fred Lenoir; Sébastien Thibaudeau	2 April 2023	22 April 2023	510	0.19
115	11	"Deflagration (The Kwamis' Choice – Part 2)" "Déflagration (Le Choix des Kwamis – Partie 2)"	Thomas Astruc; Wilfried Pain; Jun Violet; Cyril Adam; Nicolas Hess	Thomas Astruc; Mélanie Duval; Fred Lenoir; Sébastien Thibaudeau	2 April 2023	22 April 2023	511	0.17
116	12	"Perfection"	Thomas Astruc; Wilfried Pain; Jun Violet; Cyril Adam; Nicolas Hess	Thomas Astruc; Mélanie Duval; Fred Lenoir; Sébastien Thibaudeau	9 April 2023	29 April 2023	512	0.17
117	13	"Migration"	Thomas Astruc; Wilfried Pain; Jun Violet; Cyril Adam; Nicolas Hess	Thomas Astruc; Mélanie Duval; Fred Lenoir; Sébastien Thibaudeau	16 April 2023	6 May 2023	513	0.13
118	14	"Derision" "Dérision"	Thomas Astruc; Wilfried Pain; Jun Violet; Cyril Adam; Nicolas Hess	Thomas Astruc; Mélanie Duval; Fred Lenoir; Sébastien Thibaudeau	16 April 2023	13 May 2023	514	0.20
119	15	"Intuition"	Thomas Astruc; Wilfried Pain; Jun Violet; Cyril Adam; Nicolas Hess	Thomas Astruc; Mélanie Duval; Fred Lenoir; Sébastien Thibaudeau	23 April 2023	17 June 2023	515	0.11
120	16	"Protection"	Thomas Astruc; Wilfried Pain; Jun Violet; Cyril Adam; Nicolas Hess	Thomas Astruc; Mélanie Duval; Fred Lenoir; Sébastien Thibaudeau	30 April 2023	24 June 2023	516	0.16
121	17	"Adoration"	Thomas Astruc; Wilfried Pain; Jun Violet; Cyril Adam; Nicolas Hess	Thomas Astruc; Mélanie Duval; Fred Lenoir; Sébastien Thibaudeau	7 May 2023	1 July 2023	517	0.10
122	18	"Emotion" "Émotion"	Thomas Astruc; Wilfried Pain; Jun Violet; Cyril Adam; Nicolas Hess	Thomas Astruc; Mélanie Duval; Fred Lenoir; Sébastien Thibaudeau	14 May 2023	8 July 2023	518	0.15
123	19	"Action"	Thomas Astruc; Wilfried Pain; Jun Violet; Cyril Adam; Nicolas Hess	Thomas Astruc; Mélanie Duval; Fred Lenoir; Sébastien Thibaudeau	10 September 2023	17 September 2023 (YouTube) 12 March 2024 (Netflix) 6 April 2024 (Disney+ & Disney Channel)	527	0.11
124	20	"Pretension" "Prétention"	Thomas Astruc; Wilfried Pain; Jun Violet; Cyril Adam; Nicolas Hess	Thomas Astruc; Mélanie Duval; Fred Lenoir; Sébastien Thibaudeau	23 October 2023	15 July 2023	519	0.15
125	21	"Revelation" "Révélation"	Thomas Astruc; Wilfried Pain; Jun Violet; Cyril Adam; Nicolas Hess	Thomas Astruc; Mélanie Duval; Fred Lenoir; Sébastien Thibaudeau	24 October 2023	19 July 2023 (Disney+) 22 July 2023 (Disney Channel)	520	0.13
126	22	"Confrontation"	Thomas Astruc; Wilfried Pain; Jun Violet; Cyril Adam; Nicolas Hess	Thomas Astruc; Mélanie Duval; Fred Lenoir; Sébastien Thibaudeau	25 October 2023	29 July 2023	521	0.16
127	23	"Collusion"	Thomas Astruc; Wilfried Pain; Jun Violet; Cyril Adam; Nicolas Hess	Thomas Astruc; Mélanie Duval; Fred Lenoir; Sébastien Thibaudeau	26 October 2023	5 August 2023	522	0.17
128	24	"Revolution" "Révolution"	Thomas Astruc; Wilfried Pain; Jun Violet; Cyril Adam; Nicolas Hess	Thomas Astruc; Mélanie Duval; Fred Lenoir; Sébastien Thibaudeau	27 October 2023	12 August 2023	523	0.15
129	25	"Representation" "Représentation"	Thomas Astruc; Wilfried Pain; Jun Violet; Cyril Adam; Nicolas Hess	Thomas Astruc; Mélanie Duval; Fred Lenoir; Sébastien Thibaudeau	31 October 2023	19 August 2023	524	0.16
130	26	"Conformation (The Final Day – Part 1)" "Conformation (Le Dernier Jour – Partie 1)"	Thomas Astruc; Wilfried Pain; Jun Violet; Cyril Adam; Nicolas Hess	Thomas Astruc; Mélanie Duval; Fred Lenoir; Sébastien Thibaudeau	1 November 2023	26 August 2023	525	0.16
131	27	"Re-creation (The Final Day – Part 2)" "Re-création (Le Dernier Jour – Partie 2)"	Thomas Astruc; Wilfried Pain; Jun Violet; Cyril Adam; Nicolas Hess	Thomas Astruc; Mélanie Duval; Fred Lenoir; Sébastien Thibaudeau	1 November 2023	2 September 2023	526	0.19

=== Season 6 (2025–26) ===
No. overall	No. in season	English title French title	Directed by	Written by	Original air date (France)	U.S. air date	Prod. code	U.S. viewers (millions)
132	1	"The Illustrhater" "Dessinatriste"	Thomas Astruc; Wilfried Pain	Thomas Astruc; Sébastien Thibaudeau; Caroline Torelli	23 March 2025	25 January 2025	602	0.21
133	2	"Sublimation"	Thomas Astruc; Wilfried Pain	Thomas Astruc; Jean-Rémi Perrin; Sébastien Thibaudeau	23 March 2025	1 February 2025	603	0.17
134	3	"Werepapas" "Papys Garous"	Thomas Astruc; Wilfried Pain	Thomas Astruc; Sébastien Thibaudeau	26 March 2025	15 February 2025	605	0.15
135	4	"Daddycop"	Thomas Astruc; Wilfried Pain	Thomas Astruc; Pierre Doublier; Sébastien Thibaudeau	2 April 2025	8 February 2025	604	0.19
136	5	"Revelator"	Thomas Astruc; Wilfried Pain	Thomas Astruc; Sébastien Thibaudeau; Caroline Torelli	9 April 2025	19 April 2025	611	0.16
137	6	"Climatiqueen"	Thomas Astruc; Wilfried Pain	Thomas Astruc; Sébastien Thibaudeau	16 April 2025	26 April 2025	601	0.18
138	7	"El Toro de Piedra"	Thomas Astruc; Wilfried Pain	Thomas Astruc; Sébastien Thibaudeau; Caroline Torelli	23 April 2025	7 June 2025	607	0.14
139	8	"The Ruler" "La Redresseuse"	Thomas Astruc; Wilfried Pain	Thomas Astruc; Pierre Doublier; Sébastien Thibaudeau	30 April 2025	14 June 2025	615	0.17
140	9	"Mister Agreste" "Monsieur Agreste"	Thomas Astruc; Wilfried Pain	Thomas Astruc; Pierre Doublier; Sébastien Thibaudeau	24 September 2025	27 September 2025	609	0.19
141	10	"Sleeping Syren" "Princesse Syren"	Thomas Astruc; Wilfried Pain	Camélia Acef; Thomas Astruc; Sébastien Thibaudeau	1 October 2025	4 October 2025	606	0.17
142	11	"Wreckless Driver" "Psyconductrice"	Thomas Astruc; Wilfried Pain	Camélia Acef; Thomas Astruc; Sébastien Thibaudeau	8 October 2025	15 November 2025	612	0.16
143	12	"The Dark Castle" "Le Château Noir"	Thomas Astruc; Wilfried Pain	Thomas Astruc; Manuel Meyre; Sébastien Thibaudeau	15 October 2025	11 October 2025	610	0.18
144	13	"Yaksi Gozen"	Thomas Astruc; Wilfried Pain	Thomas Astruc; Wilfried Pain; Sébastien Thibaudeau	22 October 2025	22 November 2025	613	0.21
145	14	"Noe" "Noé"	Thomas Astruc; Wilfried Pain	Thomas Astruc; Sébastien Thibaudeau; Caroline Torelli	29 October 2025	28 February 2026	616	N/A
146	15	"Grendiaper" "Couchorak"	Thomas Astruc; Wilfried Pain	Thomas Astruc; Chloé Paye; Sébastien Thibaudeau	12 November 2025	7 March 2026	614	N/A
147	16	"Vampigami"	Thomas Astruc; Wilfried Pain	Thomas Astruc; Pierre Doublier; Sébastien Thibaudeau	19 November 2025	14 March 2026	608	N/A
148	17	"A Fairy Good Night" "La Fée de Beaux Rêves"	Thomas Astruc; Wilfried Pain	Thomas Astruc; Manuel Meyre; Sébastien Thibaudeau	25 March 2026	21 March 2026	617	N/A
149	18	"Heartfixer" "Renverse-cœurs"	Thomas Astruc; Wilfried Pain	Thomas Astruc; Pierre Doublier; Sébastien Thibaudeau	1 April 2026	25 April 2026	620	N/A
150	19	"Lady Chaos"	Thomas Astruc; Wilfried Pain	Thomas Astruc; Chloé Paye; Sébastien Thibaudeau	8 April 2026	28 March 2026	622	N/A
151	20	"Sadnansi" "Tristanansi"	Thomas Astruc; Wilfried Pain	Thomas Astruc; Sébastien Thibaudeau; Caroline Torelli	15 April 2026	18 April 2026	623	N/A
152	21	"Riginarazione"	Thomas Astruc; Wilfried Pain	Thomas Astruc; Chloé Paye; Sébastien Thibaudeau	22 April 2026	25 April 2026	619	N/A
153	22	"The Chained Titans" "Les Titans Chaînés"	Thomas Astruc; Wilfried Pain	Thomas Astruc; Manuel Meyre; Sébastien Thibaudeau	29 April 2026	18 July 2026	621	N/A
154	23	"The Dirtifiers" "Les Crassetastrophes"	Thomas Astruc; Wilfried Pain	Camélia Acef; Thomas Astruc; Chloé Paye; Caroline Torelli; Sébastien Thibaudeau	27 September 2026	11 July 2026	618	N/A
155	24	"Queen of the Dreadzone" "La Reine de Frayeurville"	Thomas Astruc; Wilfried Pain	Thomas Astruc; Pierre Doublier; Sébastien Thibaudeau	27 September 2026	25 July 2026	624	N/A
156	25	"Secret Protocol" "Protocole Secret"	Thomas Astruc; Wilfried Pain	Thomas Astruc; Pierre Doublier; Manuel Meyre; Sébastien Thibaudeau	4 October 2026	1 August 2026	625	N/A
157	26	"Nemesis"	Thomas Astruc; Wilfried Pain	Camélia Acef; Thomas Astruc; Chloé Paye; Caroline Torelli; Sébastien Thibaudeau	11 October 2026	8 August 2026	626	N/A

=== Season 7 (2026) ===
No. overall	No. in season	English title French title	Directed by	Written by	Original air date (France)	English air date	Prod. code	U.S. viewers (millions)
158	1	"Replay Value (The Right Time - Part 1)" "Rediffuzion (Le Bon Moment 1ère partie)"	Thomas Astruc; Wilfried Pain	Thomas Astruc; Sébastien Thibaudeau; Manuel Meyre; Pierre Doublier	1 November 2026	14 November 2026	701	TBD
159	2	"Chrysalis (The Right Time - Part 2)" "Chrysalis (Le Bon Moment 2ème partie)"	Thomas Astruc; Wilfried Pain	Thomas Astruc; Sébastien Thibaudeau; Manuel Meyre; Pierre Doublier	1 November 2026	14 November 2026	702	TBD
160	3	"Dislove" "Désamour"	Thomas Astruc; Wilfried Pain	Thomas Astruc; Sébastien Thibaudeau; Caroline Torelli; Manuel Meyre	8 November 2026	16 November 2026	703	TBD
161	4	"Manageman"	Thomas Astruc; Wilfried Pain	Thomas Astruc; Sébastien Thibaudeau; Nolwenn Pierre	15 November 2026	20 November 2026	704	TBD
162	5	"Marinette Dupain-Cheng"	Thomas Astruc; Wilfried Pain	Thomas Astruc; Sébastien Thibaudeau; Chloé Paye; Pierre Doublier	22 November 2026	20 November 2026	705	TBD
163	6	"Glaciator Extreme" "Glaciator Extrême"	Thomas Astruc; Wilfried Pain	Thomas Astruc; Sébastien Thibaudeau; Chloé Paye; Caroline Torelli	29 November 2026	20 November 2026	706	TBD
164	7	"Camilo"	Thomas Astruc; Wilfried Pain	TBA	6 December 2026	TBA	707	TBD
165	8	TBA	Thomas Astruc; Wilfried Pain	TBA	TBA	TBA	TBA	TBD
166	9	TBA	Thomas Astruc; Wilfried Pain	TBA	TBA	TBA	TBA	TBD
167	10	TBA	Thomas Astruc; Wilfried Pain	TBA	TBA	TBA	TBA	TBD
168	11	TBA	Thomas Astruc; Wilfried Pain	TBA	TBA	TBA	TBA	TBD
169	12	TBA	Thomas Astruc; Wilfried Pain	TBA	TBA	TBA	TBA	TBD
170	13	TBA	Thomas Astruc; Wilfried Pain	TBA	TBA	TBA	TBA	TBD
171	14	TBA	Thomas Astruc; Wilfried Pain	TBA	TBA	TBA	TBA	TBD
172	15	TBA	Thomas Astruc; Wilfried Pain	TBA	TBA	TBA	TBA	TBD
173	16	TBA	Thomas Astruc; Wilfried Pain	TBA	TBA	TBA	TBA	TBD
174	17	TBA	Thomas Astruc; Wilfried Pain	TBA	TBA	TBA	TBA	TBD
175	18	TBA	Thomas Astruc; Wilfried Pain	TBA	TBA	TBA	TBA	TBD
176	19	TBA	Thomas Astruc; Wilfried Pain	TBA	TBA	TBA	TBA	TBD
177	20	TBA	Thomas Astruc; Wilfried Pain	TBA	TBA	TBA	TBA	TBD
178	21	TBA	Thomas Astruc; Wilfried Pain	TBA	TBA	TBA	TBA	TBD
179	22	TBA	Thomas Astruc; Wilfried Pain	TBA	TBA	TBA	TBA	TBD
180	23	TBA	Thomas Astruc; Wilfried Pain	TBA	TBA	TBA	TBA	TBD
181	24	TBA	Thomas Astruc; Wilfried Pain	TBA	TBA	TBA	TBA	TBD
182	25	TBA	Thomas Astruc; Wilfried Pain	TBA	TBA	TBA	TBA	TBD
183	26	TBA	Thomas Astruc; Wilfried Pain	TBA	TBA	TBA	TBA	TBD

== Films ==
=== Television films ===
No.	English title French title	Directed by	Written by	Original air date (France)	U.S. release date	Prod. code
1	"Miraculous World: New York, United Heroez" "Miraculous World : New York, les héros unis"	Thomas Astruc	Thomas Astruc; Matthieu Choquet; Mélanie Duval; Fred Lenoir; Sébastien Thibaudeau	26 September 2020 (Note: First aired on Disney Channel France. It was also aired on 18 October 2020 on TFOU)	25 September 2020	327
Marinette's class visits New York City. Just before landing, their flight is raided by American supervillain Techno-Pirate, who can shut down and steal technology. He is stopped by the local superheroes: Majestia, a woman with the power of flight, tremendous speed and super-strength; Uncanny Valley, a gynoid in the form of a teenage girl; and Knightowl and Sparrow, who have advanced gadgets. Marinette's class and a class from Queens have a field trip at the New-York Historical Society, where Hawk Moth akumatizes Techno-Pirate, turning him into "Techlonizer" to distract Ladybug, Cat Noir, Sparrow and Uncanny Valley, as he secretly gets the Eagle Miraculous on display at the museum. During the fight, Cat Noir accidentally destroys Uncanny Valley, and despite Ladybug reviving her, the American superheroes berate their French counterparts. Disappointed, Adrien renounces his Miraculous and decides to return to France, also disheartening Marinette. Later, Hawk Moth gives Techlonizer the Eagle Miraculous, turning him into "Miraclonizer", who uses the Eagle's power of Liberation to free the American heroes from their codes and ethics, making them go berserk. Uncanny Valley, able to deduce Ladybug and Cat Noir's identities, recruits them to fight Miraclonizer. During the battle, Ladybug seizes the Eagle Miraculous and gives it to Sparrow, who uses it to transform into "Eagle", return the American heroes to normal, and help defeat Techlonizer. Later, Eagle, Uncanny Valley, and a Native American guardian decide to create a new generation of heroes.: Cameo: Alex Hirsch and Dana Terrace as themselves.; Part of episode was read during Brazilian Miraculous Day 2020 by voice actors.
2	"Miraculous World: Shanghai, The Legend of Ladydragon" "Miraculous World : Shanghai, la légende de Ladydragon"	Thomas Astruc	Story by : Thomas Astruc & Jeremy Zag; Teleplay by : Thomas Astruc, Matthieu Choquet, Mélanie Duval, Fred Lenoir & Sébastien Thibaudeau	4 April 2021	28 May 2021	328
Marinette visits Shanghai alone, both for her uncle Wang's 60th birthday and to see Adrien at a fashion show. However, on her first day, all her belongings — including Tikki and her Miraculous — are stolen by Fei, a young Chinese girl. Roaming the city all afternoon unable to understand anyone, Marinette soon runs into Fei, who first poses as an uninterested stranger, until she reveals she stole them to sell them to Cash, a greedy pawn shop owner for information of the one who killed Fei's adopted father and destroyed his kung fu school, which he will not reveal until she pays a very high price, unaware it was actually Cash himself. Fei later steals Marinette's belongings back from him and reveals the "kung fu school" is a front for training guardians of the "Prodigious", a magical jewel that can turn its holder into any animal from different versions of the Five Animals, provided they embody the value said animal represents. Hawk Moth overhears their conversation, and akumatizes Cash into "King Cash", whose bladed hand fan can cut through anything. King Cash opens the cave where the Prodigious is stored, and Hawk Moth uses Fei's father's bracelet to retrieve the jewel, which is almost immediately taken by Fei. Now the superhero "Ladydragon", she helps Ladybug and Cat Noir defeat King Cash, but Hawk Moth reuses the akuma to turn the Prodigious' guardian spirit, Mei Shi, into "Yan Luo Shi", who has immense size and can instantly destroy anything with his lasers. During the battle against Yan Luo Shi, Hawk Moth and Cat Noir become its victims, and Fei has a crisis of faith. Marinette helps her overcome it, and she soon leaps back into battle; with Ladybug's help, she defeats Yan Luo Shi and Ladybug restores the city, along with Hawk Moth and Cat Noir. Later Ladydragon has Cash arrested, and Mei Shi transforms into a kwami-like creature to guard Fei. She then joins Marinette, Adrien and three Shanghainese boys for dinner at Wang's restaurant.: The English version was first shown in Canada on Family Channel on 16 April 2021.
3	"Miraculous World: Paris, Tales of Shadybug and Claw Noir" "Miraculous World: Paris, les aventures de Toxinelle et Griffe Noire"	Thomas Astruc	Story by : Thomas Astruc; Teleplay by : Thomas Astruc, Mélanie Duval, Fred Lenoir & Sébastien Thibaudeau	21 October 2023	9 December 2023	528
While Marinette and Alya are having a sleepover, the former transforms into "Ubiquity", a "kamikotized" superhero with the power to open portals between universes. This allows the appearance of "Betterfly", a good version of Hawk Moth, as well as "Shadybug" and "Claw Noir", evil versions of Ladybug and Cat Noir from a parallel universe. When the heroes get cornered by their evil counterparts, Betterfly kamikotizes Cat Noir into "Celesticat", an angelic version of himself which allows them to escape. Betterfly explains he is on the run from the "Supreme", a mysterious evil entity of which Shadybug and Claw Noir are members of. The evil heroes' constant bickering attracts the attention of Monarch who creates an elaborate trap to lure out Ladybug and Cat Noir. Seeing through this, Ladybug borrows Betterfly's Miraculous to become "Ladyfly" and kamikotizes the parallel Gabriel into an angel-like superhero to protect them. However, Shadybug and Claw Noir continue to power through, going after their counterparts' jewels in order to wish away their personal problems as using their jewels is disallowed by the Supreme. Marinette and Adrien separately and successfully convince Shadybug and Claw Noir to reform. Monarch then gives himself the power to travel between universes, prompting Betterfly to turn Ladybug into a variant of Ubiquity to defeat him in all possible universes. The parallel heroes finally leave, leaving their counterparts with a new sense of hope and new aliases.: This special first premiered worldwide in France on Disney Channel on 21 October 2023, with an English version made available on secondary audio.
4	"Miraculous World: London, at the Edge of Time" "Miraculous World: Londres, la course contre le temps"	Thomas Astruc	Thomas Astruc, Mélanie Duval, Fred Lenoir, Sébastien Thibaudeau	5 October 2024	28 November 2024	529
Bug Noire travels to London to find Kagami and Adrien after Gabriel's demise. Kagami – whom Bug Noire is now aware that she knows her identity – finds out the truth about Gabriel and Tomoe on her own but allows Bug Noire to tell a half-truth to Adrien and the rest of the world. Meanwhile, Bunnyx notices the time portals in the Burrow are disappearing, signifying the end of time and the universe due to someone making a wish on the stolen Miraculouses. She rescues Marinette from the moment before the end, who transforms into "Chronobug" using the Miraculouses she renounced in "Ladybug & Cat Noir (Origins – Part 1)". She discovers that a ghost-like villain named "Spectral Looter" found out her identity and stole the Miraculouses. After failing to prevent Spectral Looter, she goes further back in time and finds out a time-traveling villain named "Timestalker" was listening in on her talking to Gabriel and Nathalie at the end of "Re-creation", including a moment where she and Nathalie made a deal to lie to the world, which she regrets. She manages to corner Timestalker and tampers with the notebook the villain used to collect evidence, preventing the universe from ending. Bunnyx and her older selves tell Chronobug that her actions do not matter as much as her reactions to things, after which Chronobug repairs the timeline. Back in her lair, Cerise – who was Spectral Looter and Timestalker – puts on the Butterfly Miraculous and swears revenge on Ladybug.: This special first premiered worldwide in France on Disney Channel on 5 October 2024, with an English version made available on secondary audio.
5	"Miraculous World: Tokyo, Stellar Force"	Thomas Astruc; Jun Violet	Thomas Astruc; Sébastien Thibaudeau; Jun Violet	1 November 2025	29 November 2025	530
Kagami asks Marinette to accompany her to Tokyo. There, Marinette learns that Kagami is friends with Kazuno, who is a member of the Stellar Force, a group of superheroes with powers based on the Western zodiac; he is Capricorn. Although Kagami does not admit it, she has feelings for Kazuno, even though he is in love with Miki, the Stellar Force's Leo. The Japanese superheroes currently bicker amongst each other, which complicates their fights against kaiju – ordinary people transformed into giant monsters by the Moddler, an alien supervillain who works for the Supreme. Marinette and Kagami transform into Ladybug and Ryuko to help the Stellar Force, but in one fight, Leo becomes transformed and almost loses her Stellar Matrix, the object that gives her powers, to the Moddler. However, Marinette later inspires Kagami and Kazuno to reconcile, acting as temporary leader of the Stellar Force to help them defeat the kaiju and restore the city. Later, Cat Noir is shown in New York fighting alongside the American superheroes as a large hand emerges from a portal.

=== Theatrical films ===
English title French title	Directed by	Written by	Original release date (France)	U.S. release date
"Ladybug & Cat Noir: The Movie" "Miraculous, le film"	Jeremy Zag	Jeremy Zag	5 July 2023	28 July 2023

== Webisodes ==
A series of webisodes, Miraculous: La Webserie, was released by TF1. They can also be found on the official YouTube channel of the cartoon. They contain clips from various episodes and are usually narrated by Marinette, who writes in her diary, or by the others. Nick also released the English version on their website as Miraculous Secrets (also A Miraculous Message), as well as on YouTube. A 2D-animated series of webisodes was also released, titled Miraculous: Tales from Paris (Miraculous, une journée à Paris).

=== Miraculous Secrets (2015–present) ===
No.	English title (web title / title card) French title	Directed by	Written by	Original release date (France)	English release date (U.S.)
1	"Cat Noir as seen by Marinette" "Chat Noir vu par Marinette"	Thomas Astruc	Unknown	2 October 2015	24 September 2016
Marinette writes about having Cat Noir as a superhero partner in her diary.
2	"Marinette and Adrien" "Marinette et Adrien"	Thomas Astruc	Unknown	7 October 2015	24 September 2016
Marinette writes about her feelings for Adrien in her diary and decides to make him the scarf seen in "The Bubbler".
3	"Marinette's Double Life" "La double vie de Marinette"	Thomas Astruc	Unknown	9 October 2015	24 September 2016
Marinette talks about her superhero life as Ladybug
4	"My Birthday Party" "La fête d'anniversaire (The Birthday Party) / Ma fête d'anniversaire"	Thomas Astruc	Unknown	13 October 2015	24 September 2016
Marinette talks about her classmates while wondering whom to invite to her birthday party
5	"Marinette and Alya" "Marinette et Alya"	Thomas Astruc	Unknown	16 October 2015	24 September 2016
Marinette talks about her friendship with Alya and what they like to do together
6	"Marinette in Paris / The City of Paris / A Miraculous message from Marinette: Paris!" "Marinette et Paris (Marinette and Paris)"	Thomas Astruc	Unknown	12 November 2015	17 December 2015
Marinette talks about her favorite monuments in Paris, including the Louvre, the Trocadéro and the Eiffel Tower.
7	"Marinette and Fashion / A Miraculous message from Marinette: Fashion!" "Marinette et la mode"	Thomas Astruc	Unknown	19 November 2015	8 January 2016
When asked about her career plans, Marinette talks about being a fashion designer, what she has designed, and what inspires her.
8	"Ladyblog / Alya's Ladyblog / A Miraculous message from Alya" "Ladyblog"	Thomas Astruc	Unknown	26 November 2015	22 January 2016
Alya talks about her Ladyblog website.
9	"Adrien's Double Life / A Miraculous message from Adrien" "La double vie d'Adrien"	Thomas Astruc	Unknown	18 December 2015	29 January 2016
Adrien talks about his life as a teenage model, the son of a rich and famous fashion designer, and his excitement about being a student. He also talks about life as Cat Noir.
10	"Ladybug as seen by Adrien / Adrien's Love Letter / A Miraculous message from Adrien: Love Letter!" "Ladybug vue par Adrien (Ladybug seen by Adrien)"	Thomas Astruc	Unknown	24 December 2015	9 January 2016
Adrien brainstorms some ideas in writing a love letter to Ladybug, and ends up crumpling it and tossing it in the garbage.
11	"Tikki"	Thomas Astruc	Sébastien Thibaudeau	2 May 2018	6 June 2018
Tikki is the Kwami of creation, she was born at the same time as the universe and has watched over each Ladybug over the centuries. This little magical creature has quickly become a real ally for Marinette both in real life and when she becomes Ladybug.
12	"Master Fu" "Maître Fu"	Thomas Astruc	Sébastien Thibaudeau	2 May 2018	25 May 2018
Master Fu is the last member of the Guardians of Miraculous Order. He gave Tikki to Marinette so she could become Ladybug. Indeed, he has an important mission to accomplish and for that he needs allies like Ladybug and Cat Noir.
13	"Plagg"	Thomas Astruc	Nolwenn Pierre	18 May 2018	9 June 2018
Plagg is Adrien's Kwami. This little creature allows him to turn into Cat Noir. He is lazy, pretentious, sarcastic, resentful and finally he loves Camembert! Plagg loves to live among humans. It's so good to bask in the soft beds, to watch TV, to play with all that hangs. Unlike Tikki, he only thinks of playing and does not have the same interest for the missions.
14	"Friends" "Les copines"	Thomas Astruc	Nolwenn Pierre	18 May 2018	14 September 2018
Alya, Rose, Alix, Juleka and Mylène are Marinette's friends. Marinette admires them a lot, whether for their strong personality, their respective qualities or their unwavering support when she tries to get Adrien's attention. They are like super-heroines everyday!
15	"Max"	Thomas Astruc	Nolwenn Pierre	28 May 2018	12 October 2018
A passionate gamer with an interest in all things technological, Max does everything according to a specific procedure and likes to plan and organize. He knows everything about everything and has a phenomenal memory. Always in control, there is only one thing that makes him angry: do not touch his suspenders!
16	"Nino"	Thomas Astruc	Nolwenn Pierre	4 June 2018	9 October 2018
Marinette talks about Nino and his favourite things while helping Alya find an idea for a Birthday present.
17	"Mylène"	Thomas Astruc	Nolwenn Pierre	12 October 2018	9 November 2018
Stubborn, idealistic and militant, Mylène has a strong sense of responsibility. She is the consciousness of the class. She likes to take a stand and commit to causes that are important to her.
18	"Alix"	Thomas Astruc	Nolwenn Pierre	25 January 2019	21 November 2018
Sporty, rebellious and disobedient, Alix excels at school. She loves competing with boys, believing girls are just as capable. Fashion-conscious, she pays attention to her street look — something Chloé hates, as she treats Alix like a tomboy.
19	"Sabrina"	Thomas Astruc	Sébastien Thibaudeau	1 February 2019	8 December 2018
20	"Rose"	Thomas Astruc	Nolwenn Pierre	8 February 2019	16 November 2018
21	"Gabriel"	Thomas Astruc	Sébastien Thibaudeau	7 March 2019	12 January 2021
22	"Ivan"	Thomas Astruc	Nolwenn Pierre	8 March 2019	17 May 2019
23	"Nathaniel & Marc" "Nathaniel et Marc / Nathaniel & Marc"	Thomas Astruc	Sébastien Thibaudeau	8 March 2019	19 January 2021
24	"Chloé as seen by Marinette" "Chloé vue par Marinette"	Thomas Astruc	Nolwenn Pierre	8 March 2019	22 January 2020
Marinette talks about Chloé and how she seems to have developed a good side, and ultimately agrees to fix her teddy bear.
25	"Marinette as seen by Chloé" "Marinette vue par Chloé"	Thomas Astruc	Nolwenn Pierre	8 March 2019	31 May 2019
26	"Lila"	Thomas Astruc	Nolwenn Pierre	8 April 2019	7 June 2019
27	"Hawk Moth and the Akumatized Villains" "Papillon et les Akumatisés"	Thomas Astruc	Sébastien Thibaudeau	12 December 2019	13 December 2019
Marinette tells the abilities of the Butterfly Miraculous and brief history of Hawk Moth.
28	"Family" "La Famille"	Thomas Astruc	Nolwenn Pierre	12 December 2019	18 December 2019
29	"Kagami as seen by Marinette" "Kagami vue par Marinette"	Thomas Astruc	Nolwenn Pierre	12 December 2019	27 December 2019
Marinette writes about her conflicting feelings regarding Kagami in her diary.
30	"Kagami as seen by Adrien" "Kagami vue par Adrien"	Thomas Astruc	Sébastien Thibaudeau	12 December 2019	3 January 2020
Adrien talks about his feelings for Kagami.
31	"Luka as seen by Marinette" "Luka vu par Marinette"	Thomas Astruc	Sébastien Thibaudeau	24 December 2019	8 January 2020
Marinette writes about her feelings for Luka in her diary.
32	"New Powers" "Nouveaux Pouvoirs"	Thomas Astruc	Sébastien Thibaudeau	24 December 2019	10 January 2020
Marinette writes about her water and ice powers, unifying kwamis, and the time she became Lady Noir.
33	"New Heroes" "Nouveaux Héros"	Thomas Astruc	Sébastien Thibaudeau	24 December 2019	15 January 2020
Marinette writes about recruiting Rena Rouge, Carapace, Pegasus, and Aspik/Viperion, as well as meeting Bunnyx.
34	"Nathalie as seen by Gabriel" "Nathalie vue par Gabriel"	Thomas Astruc	Sébastien Thibaudeau	26 December 2019	24 January 2020
Gabriel talks about what Nathalie means to him, both as herself, as Catalyst, and as Mayura
35	"Mayura and the Sentimonsters" "Mayura et les Sentimonstres"	Thomas Astruc	Sébastien Thibaudeau	26 December 2019	17 January 2020
Marinette writes about the sentimonsters and their creator.
36	"Feelings" "Les Sentiments"	Thomas Astruc	Jérôme Etter Nolwenn Pierre	13 January 2020	12 February 2020
Marinette has always tried to get close to Adrien, not knowing that he was Cat Noir and that he was in love with Ladybug. Over time, their relationship continues to evolve, as do their feelings.
37	"The First Secrets"	Unknown	Unknown	3 July 2026	TBA
38	"A Shared Secret"	Unknown	Unknown	10 July 2026	TBA
39	"Gabriel Agreste"	Unknown	Unknown	17 July 2026	TBA
40	"The New Holder of the Butterfly Miraculous"	Unknown	Unknown	24 July 2026	TBA
41	"The Power of the Guardians"	Unknown	Unknown	31 July 2026	TBA
42	"Kagami & Felix"	Unknown	Unknown	2 October 2026	TBA
43	"A Near-Perfect Alliance"	Unknown	Unknown	10 October 2026	TBA
44	"Friends for Life"	Unknown	Unknown	16 October 2026	TBA

=== Tales from Paris (2017) ===
Five episodes were made in January 2017.

No.	English title (web title / title card) French title	Directed by	Written by	Original release date (France)	English release date (U.S.)
1	"Repetition" "Répétition"	Neil Kuiffer Meray	Nolwenn Pierre	30 January 2017	15 February 2017
Tikki helps Marinette practice asking out Adrien.
2	"Inspiration" "Inspiration"	Neil Kuiffer Meray	Nolwenn Pierre	3 February 2017	26 January 2017
Marinette works on a design for a dress to wear to a school dance.
3	"Busy Day" "Grosse journée"	Neil Kuiffer Meray	Nolwenn Pierre	3 February 2017	16 March 2017
Marinette helps her parents in the bakery.
4	"Homework Essay" "L'exposé"	Neil Kuiffer Meray	Nolwenn Pierre	3 February 2017	3 April 2017
Marinette has to make a homework essay on a person who inspires her.
5	"The Notebook" "Le carnet"	Neil Kuiffer Meray	Nolwenn Pierre	3 February 2017	18 January 2017
Marinette, Alya, and Juleka cheer up Rose after Chloé makes fun of her notebook.

=== Season 1 (2018; 2023–24) ===
No. overall	No. in season	English title (web title / title card) French title	Directed by	Storyboard by	Original release date (France)	English release date (U.S.)
ZAG Chibi (First phase)
1	1	"Rooftop Dinner" "Un dîner de haut vol"	Jeremy Zag	Jean-Louis Vandestoc	31 August 2018	31 August 2018
When Cat Noir finds Ladybug on the roofs of Paris, he decides to set up a romantic dinner for her that soon turns out to be... unforgettable! Bon appétit!
2	2	"Catnip Fragrance" "Parfum Corsé"	Jeremy Zag	Valentin Lucas	31 August 2018	31 August 2018
Cat Noir tries to seduce Ladybug by putting on some irresistible new perfume. He soon starts winning hearts... but not the one he was hoping for!
3	3	"The Chase" "Chat perché"	Jeremy Zag	Valentin Lucas	31 August 2018	31 August 2018
Cat Noir decides to ask Ladybug to the movies. But if he wants the superheroine to go with him, he'll need to catch the tickets first, as they just slipped out of his hand and are now flying away in the Paris sky...
4	4	"Curiosity Kick the Cat" "Cher inconnu"	Jeremy Zag	Amanda Sun	31 August 2018	31 August 2018
Cat Noir finds out that Ladybug has written a love letter for her crush. He tries to get ahold of it to discover the mysterious stranger's identity, but soon learns the hard way that curiosity and cats do not mix.
5	5	"Cutest Cat Fight" "Chat Maillerie"	Jeremy Zag	Valentin Lucas	7 September 2018	7 September 2018
Cat Noir decides to get Ladybug a kitten, hoping to win the heart of the superheroine. But as it turns out the kitten he's set his sights on is not very cooperative.
6	6	"Fatal Posy" "Fleur fatale"	Jeremy Zag	Valentin Lucas	7 September 2018	7 September 2018
Wanting to give Adrien a present, Ladybug grows a special flower for him. But she does not realize that the plant is actually a carnivorous one... and that it's hungry! Cat Noir rushes to the rescue!
7	7	"Scarybug" "Ladybouh"	Jeremy Zag	Valentin Lucas	26 October 2018	26 October 2018
It's Halloween in Paris, and Cat Noir is determined to scare Ladybug. But the superheroine has not said her last word!: This is a Halloween special webisode.
Miraculous Chibi
8	8	"Panic at the Park" "Panique au Parc"	Jean-Baptiste Erramuzpe	Written by : Jean-Baptiste Erramuzpe; Storyboarded by : Esther Brustlein	18 November 2023	18 November 2023
Between heroic missions, Ladybug and Cat Noir take a break at the amusement park. Cat Noir takes the opportunity to win Ladybug's heart with a teddy bear. Unfortunately, Stormy Weather has other plans, turning what should be a simple mission into a challenging one!
9	9	"The Cake Race" "La Course au Gâteau"	Jean-Baptiste Erramuzpe	Written by : Jean-Baptiste Erramuzpe; Storyboarded by : Esther Brustlein & Fleur Parraud	18 November 2023	18 November 2023
It's Adrien's birthday! Marinette puts her heart and soul into making a beautiful cake for her secret love, Adrien. But that was without predicting Chloé's arrival with the same splendid cake. A frantic race then begins, leaving us all wondering: Who will be able to deliver the cake to Adrien first?
10	10	"Good Sports"	César Delmas	Written by : Nolwenn Pierre; Storyboarded by : Esther Brustlein	17 July 2024	17 July 2024
Ladybug and Cat Noir face off in a frantic sporting challenge to determine who will be the best superhero.: Note: This is the first piece of media to ever be released under the Miraculous Corp. label.

=== Season 2 (2025–26) ===
No. overall	No. in season	English title (web title / title card) French title	Written by	Storyboard by	Original release date (France)	English release date (U.S. & International)
11	1	"Chamred" "Le perroquet ne répond plus"	Laury Rovelli; Sébastien Thibaudeau	Laury Rovelli	December 24, 2025	November 28, 2025
Marinette transforms an old parrot into a majestic bird to invite Adrien out. But the parrot changes its mind and goes on a picnic with Adrien! Marinette discovers that a magic bow tie acts as a love potion and tries to get it back.
12	2	"Careless Whispurr" "Un chat de trop"	Laury Rovell	Laury Rovell	December 25, 2025	December 5, 2025
Cat Noir is jealous of the attention Ladybug pays to a stray kitten. He tries several schemes to get her attention: acting like a kitten, scaring the kitten, or using sardines. But nothing goes as planned!
13	3	"I Love Paris" "J'aime Paris"	Laury Rovell	Judith Larrede	December 24, 2025	December 12, 2025
Cat Noir invites Ladybug to discover Paris by boat. But a mosquito spoils the trip! Cat Noir battles the insect while Ladybug tries to enjoy the scenery. The situation escalates when Ladybug accidentally pushes Cat Noir into the water.
14	4	"The Christmas Sock" "La Chaussette de Noël"	Nolwenn Pierre	Arthur Cerf	December 24, 2025	December 19, 2025
Marinette is knitting a Christmas sock for Adrien, but a pigeon steals it! The bird flies off with her present on its head. Marinette chases it to its nest and disguises herself as a baby bird. Disgusted, she retrieves her sock and runs away.
15	5	"The Eiffel Tower" "La Tour Eiffel"	Alice Boucherit; Cédric Stephan; Simon Lecoq; Vincent Souchon	Judith Larrede	December 24, 2025	December 23, 2025
Cat Noir and Ladybug are having fun knocking things over with their gadgets. But a can lands on top of the Eiffel Tower! Trying to knock it down, they cause the monument to collapse. They then spend all night rebuilding it.
16	6	"Collector" "La Collection"	Simon Lecocq; Vincent Souchon; Cédric Stéphan; Alice Boucherit	Laury Rovelli; Christophe Pittet	December 24, 2025	December 25, 2025
Marinette searches a trash can for items Adrien threw away, but a rat steals everything! Following it into the sewers, she discovers it also collects Adrien's belongings. They become friends and share their common passion.
17	7	"The Ice Cream" "Chat Noir perd les boules"	Simon Lecoq; Vincent Souchon; Cédric Stephan; Alice Boucherit	Christophe Pittet	December 24, 2025	December 30, 2025
Cat Noir buys two ice creams for Ladybug, hoping to win her over. But things get complicated: a horse eats one scoop, it rolls to the subway, and Cat Noir chases after it everywhere! After a fall and a crazy idea involving a garbage truck, he finally finds Ladybug...
18	8	"Picture Perfect" "La Photo Parfaite"	Léo Bocard; Alice Boucherit; Julien Dinse; Alice Giordan	Louis Musso	March 18, 2026	January 9, 2026
Marinette tries to take the perfect picture of Adrien in the park, but nothing goes as planned! A fly gets in front of the lens, the rain starts to interfere, and even lightning threatens to ruin everything. Will she finally manage to capture the perfect moment with him?
19	9	"The Diary" "Le Journal Intime"	Léo Bocard; Branca Cepelowicz; Julien Dinse; Alice Giordan	Arthur Cerf; Christophe Pittet	March 18, 2026	February 13, 2026
Marinette watches Adrien play the piano and draws a picture of them married in her diary. Adrien notices and greets her. Flustered, she drops her diary, which lands in Adrien's bag. Marinette tries to retrieve it
20	10	"Love Is Blind" "L'amour rend aveugle"	Léo Bocard; Alice Boucherit; Julien Dinse; Alice Giordan	Julien Thompson	March 18, 2026	February 20, 2026
Cat Noir finds some amazing glasses and wants to show them to Ladybug. But he can't see well with them, which prevents him from helping Ladybug during an attack. He refuses to take them off despite the problems. Ladybug completes her mission on her own and ends up breaking them.
21	11	"The Plant" "La Plante"	Léo Bocard; Alice Boucherit; Julien Dinse; Alice Giordan	Fabrice Hagmann	March 18, 2026	February 27, 2026
Adrien entrusts his plant to Marinette before leaving for vacation. But disaster strikes! She places it in direct sunlight and it catches fire. Despite all her efforts, the plant dies and even falls into the street. Marinette has only one solution left: a mysterious shop.
22	12	"Too Many Emotions" "Opération Rigolade"	Léo Bocard; Branca Cepelowicz; Julien Dinse; Alice Giordan	Julien Thompson	March 18, 2026	March 6, 2026
For Adrien's birthday, Marinette gives him a macaron. Overwhelmed with emotion, he bursts into tears of joy. Marinette tries to make him laugh with magic tricks, clown acts, and jokes, but nothing works. The tears keep flowing!
23	13	"The Theater" "Le cinéma"	Léo Bocard; Branca Cepelowicz; Julien Dinse; Alice Giordan	Louis Musso	March 18, 2026	March 10, 2026
Marinette arrives at the cinema and discovers that Adrien is there! She wants to sit next to him, but the seats are occupied by an old lady, a timid man, and a horse! Marinette finds ways to free up the seats, but touches the horse instead of Adrien!
24	14	"Ping Pong Game" "Partie de Ping Pong"	Laury Rovelli	Corentin Penloup	March 18, 2026	March 13, 2026
Ladybug challenges Cat Noir to a game of ping pong. He accepts to impress her, but she's much better! Frustrated, Cat Noir hits the ball with all his might and wins, without winning Ladybug's heart. His old rival then challenges him to another match.
25	15	"Purrfectly Cursed" "Maudit Bracelet"	Léo Bocard; Branca Cepelowicz; Julien Dinse; Alice Giordan	Arthur Peltzer	March 18, 2026	March 17, 2026
Cat Noir gives Ladybug a bracelet, but a mummified cat mysteriously appears! Soon, other cats appear and chase them. Ladybug tries to fend them off with her magic yo-yo, but the felines seem hypnotized. Are they really dangerous?
26	16	"Cat Noir vs Marinette" "Partie de Pétanque"	Julien Dinse; Branca Cepelowicz; Simon Lecocq; Cédric Stéphan	Fabrice Hagmann	March 18, 2026	March 20, 2026
Ladybug and Cat Noir face off in a game of pétanque. Ladybug wins every time, which annoys Cat Noir. He decides to cheat to win. But Ladybug keeps winning! Finally, Cat Noir discovers that she was cheating too.
27	17	"The Smile"	Julien Dinse; Branca Cepelowicz; Simon Lecocq Cédric Stéphan	Arthur Peltzer	TBA	March 27, 2026
Adrien is at a photoshoot, but during his lunch break, he ends up with a piece of lettuce stuck in his teeth, compromising his perfect smile in front of the cameras. Marinette, noticing the problem, springs into action to help him remove the residue and restore his confidence.
28	18	"The Macaron"	Julien Dinse; Branca Cepelowicz; Simon Lecocq; Cédric Stéphan	Arthur Peltzer	TBA	March 31, 2026
Marinette is trying to make the perfect macaron. However, she faces the unexpected interference of an intruding pigeon who tries to sabotage her culinary efforts and even steal her creation. After a series of failed attempts, Marinette manages to complete the dessert, but the pigeon returns to cause trouble. The conflict is resolved with the return of Adrien, who enjoys the macaron, bringing a sweet ending to the culinary mishap.
29	19	"Super Heroes"	Julien Dinse; Simon Lecocq; Branca Cepelowicz; Cédric Stéphan	Julien Thompson	TBA	April 3, 2026
Ladybug and Cat Noir are patrolling the streets of Paris when they come across a child reading a superhero comic about Majestia. The heroine Majestia makes a special appearance, saving some birds in a nest, which has a great emotional impact on the heroic duo.
30	20	"The Jambon-Beurre"	Vincent Souchon; Léo Bocard; Alice Giordan; Laury Rovelli	Corentin Penloup	TBA	April 10, 2026
Cat Noir sings off-key, triggering a severe storm and flooding in Paris. Ladybug and Cat Noir find themselves trapped in a small boat amidst the water engulfing the city. While trying to stay safe, they spot a delicious "Jambon-Beurre" sandwich floating by, but an intruding seagull ends up stealing the snack.
31	21	"Snowball Battle"	Vincent Souchon; Léo Bocard; Alice Giordan; Laury Rovelli	Julien Thompson	TBA	April 24, 2026
With the sudden arrival of winter, Ladybug and Cat Noir take advantage of the Paris snow to start a playful competition. What begins as a winter game turns into an intense and hilarious snowball fight.
32	22	"Drawn in the Stars"	Vincent Souchon; Léo Bocard; Alice Giordan; Laury Rovelli	Arthur Peltzer	TBA	April 28, 2026
Cat Noir attempts to win Ladybug's heart using a romantic technique: he gathers bright stars to create a heart-shaped constellation in the Parisian night sky. However, the plan encounters several comical obstacles, from animals interfering with the assembly to the difficulty of keeping the stars in place.
33	23	"The Bodyguard"	Cédric Stéphan; Branca Cepelowicz; Alice Boucherit; Julien Dinse	Arthur Peltzer	TBA	May 1, 2026
Adrien's bodyguard, Placide I.T., is sick in bed, opening an opportunity for Marinette to try and take on the role of protector for Adrien. However, she becomes extremely controlling, preventing Adrien from enjoying everyday things.
34	24	"The Yoyo"	Cédric Stéphan; Branca Cepelowicz; Alice Boucherit; Julien Dinse	Arthur Peltzer	TBA	May 8, 2026
When Cat Noir looked at Ladybug's yo-yo and started playing with it, he accidentally dropped it into the claw machine at the amusement park. Afraid that Ladybug would find out, he drew dots on a regular yo-yo, and then Cat Noir tried to retrieve Ladybug's original yo-yo.
35	25	"The Spider"	Léo Bocard; Vincent Souchon; Alice Giordan; Laury Rovelli	Christophe Pittet	TBA	May 15, 2026
A lightning bolt struck the Eiffel Tower, starting a fire. Ladybug and Cat Noir tried to use a fire extinguisher, but Cat Noir couldn't grab it because of a cute little spider inside.
36	26	"Ice Cream Day"	Cédric Stéphan; Branca Cepelowicz; Alice Boucherit; Julien Dinse	Corentin Penloup	TBA	May 19, 2026
Marinette repeatedly tries to get a chocolate ice cream from André, but every time she gets close, Adrien appears and she ends up getting distracted or suffering a comical accident. Frustrated, she uses a magic hourglass to try to control time and finally get her ice cream, but her attempts continue to result in disastrous situations.
37	27	"Panic at the Picnic"	Cédric Stéphan; Alice Giordan; Alice Boucherit; Vincent Souchon	Arthur Peltzer	TBA	May 22, 2026
Marinette tries to organize a romantic picnic with Adrien, but a series of comical mishaps disrupt her plans.
38	28	"The Challenge"	Cédric Stéphan; Alice Giordan; Alice Boucherit; Vincent Souchon	Fabrice Hagman	TBA	May 26, 2026
Ladybug and Cat Noir engage in a competitive balancing act across the rooftops of Paris. The challenge, which begins with simple books, intensifies as they attempt to stack increasingly larger objects on their heads, facing diverse weather conditions and distractions.
39	29	"Tiny Ghost"	Fanny Courtillot; Simon Lecocq; Léo Bocard; Vincent Souchon	Corentin Penloup	TBA	May 30, 2026
That night at the library, Marinette uses a magic book to summon a small ghost. She wants to use the ghost to scare Adrien and get a hug. However, the plan takes an unexpected turn when the ghost, instead of scaring the boy, ends up befriending him, leading Adrien to hug the little ghost himself.
40	30	"Watt a Dream Date!"	Christophe Pittet	Christophe Pittet	TBA	June 2, 2026
In the playful and colorful world of Miraculous Chibi, Marinette is determined to arrive on time for her date with Adrien thanks to her BYD electric car. But along the way, a series of unexpected mishaps and funny little obstacles turn her journey into a chaotic adventure. Through every twist, turn, and magical moment, the BYD becomes more than just a car — it helps Marinette keep moving forward and brings her one step closer to her perfect dream date.: This episode is a partnership with BYD Auto.
41	31	"The Rose"	Fanny Courtillot; Simon Lecocq; Léo Bocard; Vincent Souchon	Julien Thompson	TBA	June 5, 2026
42	32	"The Portrait"	Fanny Courtillot; Simon Lecocq; Léo Bocard; Vincent Souchon	Arthur Peltzer	TBA	June 9, 2026
43	33	"The Party"	Cédric Stéphan; Vincent Souchon; Alice Boucherit; Alice Giordan	Julien Thompson	TBA	June 16, 2026
44	34	"Kitten in Distress"	Cédric Stéphan; Alice Boucherit; Alice Giordan; Vincent Souchon	Fabrice Hagman	TBA	June 19, 2026
45	35	"The Unlove Potion"	Fanny Courtillot; Simon Lecocq; Léo Bocard; Vincent Souchon	Corentin Penloup	TBA	June 23, 2026
46	36	"The Smell"	Fanny Courtillot; Simon Lecocq; Alice Giordan; Vincent Souchon	Arthur Peltzer	TBA	June 26, 2026
47	37	"The Gift"	Fanny Courtillot; Simon Lecocq; Alice Giordan; Vincent Souchon	Julien Thompson	TBA	June 30, 2026
48	38	"Hiccup!"	Unknown	TBA	July 3, 2026	TBA
49	39	"The Ragdoll"	Unknown	TBA	July 7, 2026	TBA
50	50	"The Label"	Unknown	TBA	July 10, 2026	TBA
51	41	"Latte Art"	Unknown	TBA	July 14, 2026	TBA
52	42	"The Unbreakable Tuna Can"	Unknown	TBA	July 17, 2026	TBA
53	43	"New Hair Cat"	Unknown	TBA	July 21, 2026	TBA
54	44	"Carriage Ride"	Unknown	TBA	July 25, 2026	TBA
55	45	"It Noir"	Unknown	TBA	July 28, 2026	TBA
56	46	"The Camembert"	Unknown	TBA	August 1, 2026	TBA
57	47	"Baking Nightmare"	Unknown	TBA	August 5, 2026	TBA
58	48	"Snow-Adrien"	Unknown	TBA	August 9, 2026	TBA
59	49	"Karaoke Battle"	Unknown	TBA	August 15, 2026	TBA
60	60	"When Adri Met Lady"	Unknown	TBA	August 21, 2026	TBA
61	61	"Messy Dancing"	Unknown	TBA	August 26, 2026	TBA
62	62	"The Bouquet"	Unknown	TBA	August 29, 2026	TBA
63	63	"Meow the Best Cat Win"	TBA	TBA	TBA	September 1, 2026

=== Miraculous: Action (2023) ===
No.	English title (web title / title card) French title	Directed by	Storyboard by	Original release date (France)	English release date (U.S.)
1	"Youth empowerment and leadership" "Le pouvoir et le leadership des junes"	Unknown	TBA	18 September 2023	18 September 2023
2	"Reduce, Reuse, Recycle" "Réduire, Réutiliser, Recycler"	Unknown	TBA	22 September 2023	22 September 2023
3	"Plastic: The story so far" "L'histoire du plastique"	Unknown	TBA	24 September 2023	24 September 2023
4	"Become an advocate to reduce plastic" "Devenir un défenseur pour réduire le plastique"	Unknown	TBA	26 September 2023	26 September 2023
5	"Innovation and Creativity" "Innovation et créativité"	Unknown	TBA	28 September 2023	28 September 2023
