= Robot Man of Szeged =

Hungarian robot created in 1962

Robot Man of Szeged (Szegedi Robotember)
- Inventor: Dr. Dániel Muszka
- Country: Hungary
- Year of creation: 1962 (63 years ago)
- Type: stationary robot
- Purpose: receptionist/host

The Robot Man of Szeged (Hungarian: Szegedi Robotember, literally "Robot Human of Szeged") was an early robot which was developed in Hungarian People's Republic in 1962. It was designed and constructed by Dr. Dániel Muszka of the University of Szeged, the same creator of the Ladybird of Szeged. The robot was made to serve in the Pioneer House of Szeged as a robotic receptionist, greeting and guiding visitors at the entrance.

The original Robot Man was scrapped since its debut, but Muszka built a replica in 2014.

== Conception and name ==
The Robot Man was constructed at the request of the Pioneer House of Szeged.

The robot's name in Hungarian is Szegedi Robotember, literally "Robot Human of Szeged".

== Structure ==
The Robot Man was a roughly human-sized stationary robot. It was capable of rotating its head in a 100° range using an automobile windscreen wiper motor taken from a Wartburg 311. It had a photosensor built in the front of its torso. The robot's left hand held a panel of 24 buttons with topic labels next to them. The right hand held a transistor radio. The head had two "eyes" which could light up and an antenna on the top.

== Operation ==
The Robot Man's photosensor on its "stomach" enabled it to sense when people passed it or stood in front of it, and to "greet" them audibly. Pressing an associated button of a topic on the panel held in the robot's left hand made the Robot Man "talk" about the desired topic. The radio held in the robot's right hand either played Kossuth Rádió or Petőfi Rádió, the entirety of domestic national broadcasts of the day. During operation, the robot's "eyes" were lit and its antenna on top of its head spun.

== Publicity ==
The Robot Man's replica was first exhibited at the A kibernetika hőskora – avagy volt élet a PC előtt ("The Heroic Age of Cybernetics, or, There was Life Before the PC") temporary exhibition held at the Museum of Nuclear Energetics of the Paks Nuclear Power Plant at Paks in 2014. The next public appearance was at the Technical Study Stores of the Hungarian Technical and Transportation Museum (MMKM) at Budapest in 2015, as part of the annual Night of the Museums. As of 2017, the replica is one of the exhibit items at the MI és a Robot ("AI and the Robot") temporary robotics exhibition held at the Informatics History Exhibition (ITK) in Szeged.

== See also ==
- Elektro – a similarly sized, early humanoid robot
- Ladybird of Szeged – Muszka's other robot
