= Lady Bug (disambiguation) =

Lady bugs (Coccinellidae) are a widespread family of small beetle.

Lady Bug or Ladybug may also refer to:

- Lady Bug (Koons), a 2014 augmented reality sculpture by Jeff Koons
- Ladybug (magazine), an illustrated literary magazine for children
- "Ladybug" (The Presidents of the United States of America song), 2008
- Lady Bug (video game), 1981
- FL Lady Bug, an American Quarter Horse mare
- Ladybugs, a female Beatlesque band in the television comedy series Petticoat Junction
- Ladybugs (film), a 1992 film starring Rodney Dangerfield
- The Ladybugs, an American jazz band
- "Lady Bug", a song by Breaking Benjamin on the 2004 EP, So Cold
- Ladybug, a.k.a. Marinette Dupain-Cheng, the female titular character of the French television series Miraculous: Tales of Ladybug & Cat Noir
- Ladybug Mecca, a member of the rap group Digable Planets
- Ladybug (comics), a DC Comics superhero
- "Ladybug", a song by Agents Of Oblivion from Agents Of Oblivion

== See also ==
- Ladybug Ladybug (film)
- Ladybird (disambiguation)
