= Marinette Dupain-Cheng =

Female protagonist of Miraculous: Tales of Ladybug & Cat Noir

Marinette Dupain-Cheng Ladybug
- Miraculous: Tales of Ladybug & Cat Noir character
- Marinette Dupain-Cheng as she appears in seasons 1–5 and movie
- First appearance: "Stormy Weather" (2015)
- Created by: Thomas Astruc
- Voiced by: English Cristina Vee; French Anouck Hautbois
- Inspired by: Spider-Man

In-universe information
- Full name: Marinette Dupain-Cheng
- Alias: Ladybug
- Species: Human (as Marinette); Ladybug-based superhuman (as Ladybug)
- Occupation: Student; Superheroine
- Affiliation: The Miraculers
- Weapon: Yo-yo (as Ladybug)
- Home: Paris
- Nationality: French and Chinese
- Abilities: Creation (main); Enhanced agility, dexterity, speed, and strength; Nigh-invulnerability; Purification of akumas and amoks; Restoration (all as Ladybug)

Marinette Dupain-Cheng (French pronunciation: [maʁinɛt dypɛ̃ tʃɛŋ]) is the titular co-protagonist of Miraculous: Tales of Ladybug & Cat Noir created by Thomas Astruc. A teenage student of Chinese and French descent, she aspires to become a fashion designer. Marinette is one of the superheroes alongside Cat Noir. She has a pair of earrings known as the Ladybug Miraculous, which, when worn, grant Marinette the ability to transform into Ladybug, her superheroine alias. Ladybug and Cat Noir's goal is to protect Paris from the villain Hawk Moth and defeat him altogether. As the holder of a Miraculous, Marinette is assisted by a small red creature resembling a ladybug called Tikki, who is a magical being known as a kwami. As Ladybug, Marinette's signature ability is creation (through her Lucky Charm superpower). Marinette appears in most Miraculous media, including the main series, the film, the Roblox game, the mobile running game, and the comic books.

Marinette's character was inspired by a young woman wearing a ladybug-themed T-shirt who once worked with Astruc. After creating a drawing that portrayed her as a ladybug-themed superheroine, Astruc felt this would be a good character, especially as he was not aware of the existence of another ladybug-related superhero. The woman's haircut served as inspiration for Marinette's hairstyle as well. Marinette is voiced by Cristina Vee in the English dub, while Anouck Hautbois voices her in the French version of the series.

Marinette's character has received a generally positive critical response, with writers characterizing her as a role model for viewers and as a great protagonist; both her civilian self and her superheroine identity have been praised. Meet-and-greet sessions with Ladybug have taken place. Several pieces of merchandise based on her, such as accessories, clothing items, and action figures, have been created.

== Development ==
=== Concept and creation ===
Ladybug

The superheroine identity of Marinette Dupain-Cheng, Ladybug, was inspired by a young woman wearing a T-shirt with a ladybug depicted on it. She belonged to the production team of another show that also included Thomas Astruc, the creator of the show, Miraculous: Tales of Ladybug & Cat Noir. Astruc befriended her, and following this they had started creating and "exchanging ladybug-themed sticky notes," which included a note drawn by israel that portrayed the woman as a ladybug-themed superheroine. Astruc did not know of the existence of a ladybug-related superhero and felt this character would be good. Additionally, Astruc thought that a superhero based on this idea had not previously been created because of not being sufficiently masculine. As a result, Ladybug's character was conceptualized. Marinette's hairstyle was also conceived using the woman's haircut as a model. Astruc said that Ladybug's power was connected to luck since ladybugs are associated with good luck and also commented that Ladybug's character is comparable to Spider-Man.

Astruc stated that while Marinette is a girl of action, this does not prevent her from wearing pink. He characterized Ladybug as an "awesome", special, very positive, and a bright character. He also described her as his favorite character from the series. Astruc hoped that children would view Ladybug as a positive example, and that she would become the mascot of Paris, being found on flyers at museums' entrances to inspire children to visit them. In regard to Marinette and Adrien Agreste, he commented that he had wished to depict "sunny," inspiring characters. Astruc mentioned that Ladybug is one of the two most "powerful teenagers" alongside Cat Noir since she has the power of creation. He stated that handling the dynamics between Marinette's and Adrien's identities was entertaining. Astruc said that couples of superheroes like the one consisting of Ladybug and Cat Noir are uncommon in shows, and he felt that the viewers enjoy the love situation formed between the two of them. A source of inspiration for the duo of the ladybug and the black cat was one of Astruc's previous romantic relationships. Astruc stated that, as long as there was a villain in the show, a romantic relationship between Marinette and Adrien would be able to happen only under certain circumstances and would need to be handled carefully, commenting that such a relationship would be brittle and complicated.

Ladybug's costume was difficult to animate when it came to the show's original 2D version since it was red with black dots; the dots had to be in certain places and had to remain unmoved. In the 3D version, this problem disappeared since there was a model moving. In the 2D version, Marinette was supposed to be older than she currently is in the 3D version. The chibi design of Ladybug from the series Miraculous Chibi was conceived by character designer Angie Nasca. The bakery of Marinette's family was inspired by a real-life Parisian bakery.

Astruc commented that deciding how Ladybug would use a certain item created with the help of her Miraculous to defeat the villain takes a quarter of the writers' working time for an episode; Sébastien Thibaudeau, the writing director of Miraculous, stated that Ladybug is intelligent since she manages to do what in reality, several people can think of only when collaborating with each other. According to Thibaudeau, the writers wanted Marinette to not be based on clichés and to resemble a contemporary girl, able to create things and desiring to achieve something in life; they also wished Marinette's transformation into a self-assured superheroine to show that people can change and become stronger. Marinette is also meant to highlight that one has to fight and be open-minded and smart in order to be successful in life. Thibaudeau said Marinette tries to improve Adrien's difficult life. Fred Lenoir, also a writer for Miraculous, stated that Marinette's relationship with Adrien, both as civilians and as superheroes, is the main part of the show. Astruc mentioned that the third season of the series served as a test for Marinette; Mélanie Duval, another writer of Miraculous, commented that Marinette had a lot of obstacles to overcome in that season.

Jeremy Zag, the president of the animation studio Zagtoon, described Marinette as "a fresh and modern girl character who is in line with kids' and teens' lives today." The first two images depicting Ladybug released by Zag, one showing her portrait and the other featuring her on a rooftop in Paris, received enough attention to surround the world. Zag said the love situation that Marinette created alongside Adrien, their superhero identities, and their secrets represent some of the main parts of the story. Jared Wolfson, the executive producer of Miraculous, stated that the audience of girls had been waiting for "someone like a Spider-Man to come along" and that, because of Ladybug's character, they can now transform into her, becoming "stronger" and making "an effect in the world". With regard to Ladybug's character, Aton Soumache, the chief executive officer of the company Method Animation, said the producers had wished to "create a [glamorous] superhero character with a real European flair with Paris as backdrop," as a result of the previous lack of an action series centered on a female superhero.

Nicole D'Andria, a contributor to the creation of a Miraculous comic book, said that Ladybug is an admirable character. ZAG America's president of global consumer products, André Lake Mayer, stated that children are fond of Ladybug's character, and that the fans would enjoy playing as Ladybug in the Miraculous mobile running game. She felt that Ladybug "is instantaneously empowering to all women, all ages", saying that she "is mesmerizing both as Marinette and as Ladybug." Mayer stated that "even without knowing the story," "she is instinctively familiar, authentic and strong," adding that "Ladybug is an icon for wholesome girl empowerment." She also characterized Ladybug as "relatable," and as "unique."

=== Voice ===
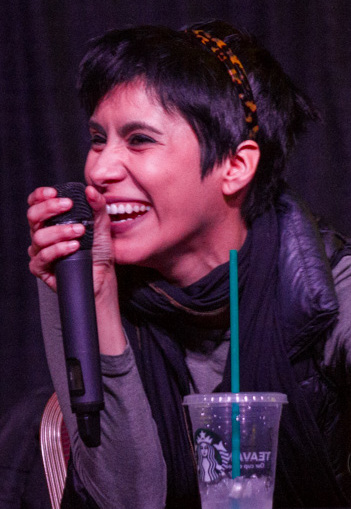
Cristina Vee voices Marinette in the English version of the series.

Cristina Vee voices Marinette in the English dub. Vee stated that she loves Marinette, describing her as one of her favorite characters that she voiced. She said Marinette reminds her of the character Sailor Moon, commenting that "working on the show" had given her "the same feelings" as the ones she had experienced while "watching Sailor Moon growing up as a kid". She stated that she had auditioned for Marinette's role considerably, most likely more than she had previously done for other characters. Vee said she had first obtained the script for the audition around a year before being cast, adding that she had not received a reply after auditioning. Following this, she had acquired the script once again, and after the audition, she received two callbacks. She stated that ever since she had seen Marinette's character design and the script, she had known that "whoever was cast as this character, Ladybug, would be the luckiest girl", precisely "the luckiest voice actress". After reading the script for the first time, Vee felt that Marinette was a version "on paper" of herself, and that she had fallen in love with Ladybug immediately. She commented that she had not been aware of this show's existence before auditioning for Marinette's role, which surprised her since she kept herself up to date with anime-related news. After auditioning and before receiving the callbacks, she found out about the anime promotional video of the series. After seeing the video, she started wanting the role all the more.

Vee said that she resembles Marinette very much, sometimes being "pretty shy and clumsy" and stumbling over her "words and feet". While she liked that Marinette is affectionate toward Adrien and "mixes up her words sometimes," Vee regarded "fighting crime as Ladybug" as "her favorite part" of voicing her, stating that she enjoyed the moments when Marinette says her specific phrases for her transformation into Ladybug and for using her signature superheroine ability. She mentioned that Marinette and Adrien learning about each other's identities would be "exciting", adding that she wished to see how they would "work together in a different way to fight crime". Vee characterized this show as "amazing," stating that she had never seen an animation like this before and that "every episode is just so beautiful".

Many voice actors auditioned for the roles of the main characters, including Marinette's, when the casting for the series started. Ezra Weisz, the voice director of Miraculous, said that the staff in charge of the casting had wished Marinette to sound confident, yet not excessively proud as a superheroine, and they had wanted to find someone whose voice would be able to distinguish Marinette's civilian identity from her superheroine self. Weisz mentioned that Vee does a remarkable job on voicing Marinette. He stated that Vee "has a young heroine quality to her voice", adding that he had always wished Vee "to be an actual superhero" since he felt she is a superheroine "in real life". Weisz commented that Vee portrays the idea of a nervous teenager that becomes embarrassed around the person they love very well. He said that when Vee "transforms into Ladybug, she gets to put on her confidence", stating that this is precisely what she emanates in the vocal booth.

Jared Wolfson mentioned that Vee is energetic. He said she has a "beautiful personality", describing her as "so sweet", "so kind", and "great". He stated that in the recording studio, Vee "goes from sweet Marinette to Ladybug", adding that "she is Ladybug in that room" and that this is "so fun to watch".

Vee reprised her role as Marinette for Ladybug & Cat Noir: The Movie (2023).

Anouck Hautbois voices Marinette in the French version of the series. Thomas Astruc regarded Hautbois and the rest of the French cast as fantastic.

== Appearances ==
=== In the main series ===
Marinette is the main female protagonist of the Miraculous series. She is portrayed as a French-Italian-Chinese teenage student from Paris, who wishes to become a fashion designer. Marinette is the daughter of Tom Dupain and Sabine Cheng, granddaughter of Rolland and Gina Dupain, and grandniece of Wang Cheng. Her parents own a bakery. One day, when rushing toward school, Marinette notices an elderly man in danger and immediately saves him. While Marinette is not aware of this at the time, the man is Master Fu, the keeper of the magical objects called the Miraculouses, who has prepared a test in order to find someone deserving of becoming a superhero. Since Marinette has saved him, Master Fu decides to offer her the Ladybug Miraculous, which is a pair of earrings. After Marinette sees the box that contains the earrings and opens it, a creature resembling a ladybug who presents herself as Tikki appears; she is a magical being known as a kwami, who grants Marinette the power to transform into a superheroine when wearing the earrings.

When she sees Tikki for the first time, Marinette is afraid of her. She is also not thrilled by the idea of becoming a superheroine, and the first time she transforms is by mistake. Nevertheless, she learns how to act as a superhero shortly after that and introduces her superheroine alias, Ladybug. Marinette's superheroine outfit derives from Tikki's appearance, resembling a ladybug. Marinette is in love with Adrien, a boy from her class whom she gets nervous around. Unknown to Marinette, Adrien is actually her superhero partner, Cat Noir, who fancies Ladybug. Since Marinette is not aware of Cat Noir's civilian identity, she constantly rejects his advances toward her. Ladybug and Cat Noir's objective is to protect Paris from Hawk Moth, an evil supervillain who has the ability to turn people into supervillains; he wishes to acquire Ladybug's and Cat Noir's Miraculouses, and, unknown to them, is actually Adrien's father. As Ladybug, Marinette becomes more sure of herself. The transformation into Ladybug offers her new abilities. Her signature power is creation, named "Lucky Charm". Ladybug's superheroine weapon is a yo-yo.

Marinette has a loving relationship with her parents, and a close bond with Tikki. She also has a mainly positive relationship with her classmates, particularly with her best friend, Alya Césaire; Alya often offers support to Marinette and is there for her when she needs help, and she is a big fan of Ladybug. Marinette also has a close relationship with her one-time love interest, Luka Couffaine. At the same time, Marinette does not get along with Chloé Bourgeois, nor with Lila Rossi, because of their derogatory behavior toward her.

In the fifth season of the series, Marinette tries to distance herself from Adrien, and she starts falling in love with Cat Noir in the process. However, when they eventually kiss, Marinette realizes that it is impossible to pursue any relationship with him because of not knowing his true identity, and she gets closer to Adrien again, eventually leading to them dating, though she eventually breaks up with him when he is sent to London. At the end of the season, Marinette learns that Adrien's father, Gabriel Agreste, has been behind the mask of Hawk Moth, Shadow Moth and later Monarch all along, and she decides not to share this information with Adrien but the two get back together in the end.

However, in the sixth season, Marinette finds herself facing a greatest burden from just trying to hide that she's Ladybug to the public. As shown in the special Miraculous World London, and the season five finale, Marinette was asked by Gabriel to never reveal his malicious acts as Monarch to anyone, not even Adrien. Nathalie supported this and agreed to keep her actions as Mayura buried as well so she could serve as Adrien's surrogate mother and legal guardian. She restored the Miraculous and entrusted them to the rest of the team on a permanent basis. In the meantime, Marinette faces several of Chrysalis' akumatized victims, but falls victim to a trap that sees her finally akumatized into "Heartfixer", only for Adrien to break her out of it after explaining what happened and reaffirming his love for her. When Chrysalis manages to infiltrate her own home disguised as Wang Cheng on Sabine's birthday, Marinette makes a life-changing decision and reveals she's Ladybug to her parents. Afterwards, Alya confronts her, revealing she found out that Gabriel and Monarch were one and the same, but puts the issue aside to set a trap for Chrysalis that Marinette thought of that was highly risky and dangerous. Though Chrysalis is forced to burn down her lair to protect her identity and escapes the Miraculers when she falls for it, the Miraculers were now aware of her shapeshifting powers and prepare to counter them in the future. In the meantime, Alya warns Marinette never to lie to her again if they are to remain best friends, and leaves her with the decision to tell Adrien the truth, putting Marinette in a position where she believes she'll have to break up with Adrien if she can't tell him the truth and continues to lie to him to protect their relationship.

Marinette remains true to her word with breaking up with Adrien at the start of the seventh season, but not without learning through an akumatized Dr. Psiquat of the name of the new Hawk Moth: Chrysalis, along with learning that her classmate Aglae was a cover identity Chrysalis used to get close to her at school. After then telling the whole story of Adrien's origins as a sentimonster-human hybrid, Emilie's cause of her death, and Gabriel's descent into madness with becoming the original Hawk Moth/Shadow Moth/Monarch in his grief to Alya and her parents, realizing now the true level of the burden Marinette now bears, Alya apologizes for her earlier anger over this issue, and becomes supportive of Marinette in her situation. Later, Marinette tries to give up her duties as Ladybug and Guardian to Alya so she can assume the duties as Guardian and Scarabella while Marinette becomes Renardette with the Fox Miraculous, but after exposing Chrysalis having infiltrated the Miraculers as King Monkey and stolen the Monkey Miraculous, leaving Kim out of commission and unable to help the team, Marinette takes back her responsibilities and becomes Guardian and Ladybug again, before having the Miraculers reveal their civilian identities to each other to ensure Chrysalis can't infiltrate their ranks again, although Ladybug and Cat Noir maintain their own secret identities due to the danger of their Miraculous falling into the wrong hands, especially Chrysalis, to summon Gimmi and make a wish with the Kwami of Reality.

=== In other Miraculous media ===
Besides the main series, Marinette appears in most Miraculous media. She is present in the Christmas special episode, which consists of a musical format. Marinette appears in the special episodes set in New York City, Shanghai, Paris, London and Tokyo. She is featured in the series of webisodes, including the Miraculous Chibi webisodes, the Tales from Paris webisodes, the Miraculous Secrets webisodes, and the Miraculous: Action webisodes. Marinette has appeared in several sequences where she has addressed the viewers in a direct way, and in a live session sustained on the YouTube account of Disney Channel. She is part of a video clip promoting proper hygiene among children.

Marinette has served as an inspiration for the Miraculous Roblox game, and she is also a playable character in the Miraculous mobile running game. She appears in comic books inspired by the series; she is present in other types of books based on the show as well. Marinette is also pictured in the official Miraculous magazine. She was set to appear in a 2D OVA. Marinette has been depicted in live stage shows, including during a tour.

Marinette is featured in the Miraculous animated musical film, originally titled Ladybug & Cat Noir Awakening and later renamed to Ladybug & Cat Noir: The Movie.

== Reception ==
=== Critical response ===
Critical reception of Marinette has been generally positive, with writers describing her as a famous character, and as "pretty", charismatic, clever, sweet, and inventive. Emily Ashby of Common Sense Media characterized Marinette as "patient" and "kind". ComicsVerse writer Michele Kirichanskaya felt that the series "takes the time to address Marinette's heritage" in "a subtle and respectful manner", citing the "moments when she struggles with speaking Chinese" and has "cultural miscommunications with relatives". Kirichanskaya wrote that Marinette's complete name when "translated from both Chinese and French languages" is "appropriate for a girl whose family owns a bakery". She described Marinette as "loyal and devoted to her friends and family". Kirichanskaya said Marinette being "an aspiring fashion designer" that makes "new creations in her spare time" shows that "feminine interests [do not] necessarily detract from superheroic qualities", deeming this "a positive message for male and female viewers alike". She thought that the feelings Marinette has for Adrien "only define one aspect of her character". Caroline Gourdin of La Libre Belgique stated that Marinette's character is one of the main aspects of the series, adding that she can appeal to both girls and boys. Nerd Much? writer Emily Auten felt that "Marinette's shoujo-like crush on Adrien" is one of the "small aspects that anime fans can appreciate" in this show. Auten wrote that "Marinette takes center stage" as a protagonist despite the lack of heroines in television series; she also stated that "Marinette is a great female protagonist". Auten said Marinette is "very well-written", stating that she is "a great role model" for both children and adults "to look up to and relate with". She praised Cristina Vee's role as Marinette's voice actress. An El Intransigente writer said that the applauded protagonist of this series is a girl, unlike how it happens in other shows, and that Marinette has a big heart. Marinette was commented to have "innocent optimism". She was described as a very important character for children from many countries, including France.

Marinette's superheroine form, Ladybug, has been commended. Elle Collins of ComicsAlliance said the way "Marinette transforms into Ladybug in a series of twirls and poses" resembles how "Sailor Moon and other magical girls always do". She felt that Marinette having "the guidance of some kind of talking ladybug creature" completes "another Magical Girl trope". Los Angeles Times writer Robert Lloyd commented that Marinette is a "smart girl" and characterized her superheroine form as "a costumed crusader". Michele Kirichanskaya stated that while Marinette initially "appears to be just an ordinary girl", with the help of "a pair of magical earrings" she "can transform into the Miraculous Ladybug, one of Paris's greatest superheroes". She described Marinette as "a bright, talented, creative young woman, trying to balance her daily life with all the responsibilities that entail being France's greatest superheroine". Kirichanskaya characterized Ladybug as "an incredible hero" that is "fluid and confident in battle". She felt that "Marinette embodies the most" of both her ordinary and superheroine lives "in a beautiful force of a character". Laura Aasland of Culture Honey praised that, while Ladybug keeps "groaning at Cat Noir's puns", Marinette has feelings for Adrien. Ella Anders of BSCkids said that while "from a glance [Marinette] appears to be a typical high-school teen", she is "a champion of right" in reality. Epicstream's Caitlin Donovan described Marinette as "an adorable lead who is genuinely awkward as a civilian" yet "confident as a superhero", feeling this "makes for an interesting contrast". Best Movie writer Irene Rosignoli commended Marinette's ability to transform from her shy civilian self into a courageous, confident, and resolute superheroine, viewing it as a constructive message for girls throughout the world. Ladybug was characterized as an amazing superheroine that can immediately impress the young viewers, and she was deemed capable, brave, and girls' favorite superhero.

=== Popularity and merchandise ===
Bandai's brand management vice president, Kenji Washida, described Marinette as "a quirky but lovable girl growing up, going to school and having first crushes", stating that she is a character "girls can relate to"; he said Marinette's superheroine alter ego is "someone they want to be". Washida viewed "the concept of a young girl as a superhero" as "a game-changer in both toys and entertainment". Guess's chief creative officer and chairman, Paul Marciano, praised Marinette's secret identity and her relationship with Adrien. The licensing director of Gemma International, Tim Rudd-Clarke, characterized Ladybug as "a strong and empowered female superhero" that "fills a huge gap in the market that has been vacant for quite some time". The PGS Entertainment staff described Marinette as a female "lead superhero" that "instills positive values". A life-size wax statue depicting Ladybug has been showcased at the Musée Grévin. A Snapchat filter inspired by her has been created. Ladybug has been portrayed on buses. Indoor playgrounds based on Ladybug and Cat Noir have been built. Meet-and-greets containing Ladybug have been arranged, including at a theme park. She has served as inspiration for a Christmas event, and for face painting. Cosplays of her have been made.

Several pieces of merchandise inspired by Marinette's civilian and superheroine identities have been created, including action figures, clothing items, accessories, masks, and stickers. Happy Meals based on Marinette have been launched by McDonald's. Figurines portraying Ladybug have been developed by Funko, and by Burger King. Toys based on her have been produced, such as Kinder Surprise toys, and a toy telephone. Danone products inspired by Ladybug have been launched. A game based on Ladybug and other Miraculous characters has been released. Beach-related items depicting Ladybug have been produced, and school-related items portraying her have also been invented. Sweets inspired by her have been created, such as Pez candy dispensers. Other products based on her, including bedclothes, have also been developed.

== See also ==
- Chinese community in Paris
