= The Ladybirds (band) =

Louisville, Kentucky-based retro garage rock band

- Origin: Louisville, Kentucky
- Genres: Garage rock
- Years active: 2007–2015
- Members: Sarah Teeple; Jaxon Lee Swain; Max Balliet; Anthony Fossaluzza; Brett Holsclaw

The Ladybirds are a Louisville, Kentucky-based retro garage rock band.

== History ==
The Ladybirds first took root when Jaxon Lee Swain and Sarah Teeple met in Bloomington, Indiana over an affinity for classic R&B and shared memories of Americana the likes of riding about in a car with AM oldies blasting. They relocated to Louisville and incorporated their friend Max Balliet into the group. The band cycled through many drummers before making Brett Holsclaw the permanent drummer.

The band was originally conceived as a throwback girl-group the likes of The Shangri-Las. Flavors of surf, rockabilly, doo wop, and retro bubblegum pop are all apparent to their music. Since September 2011, The Ladybirds have toured the Midwest, South, and East Coast of the US in support of their latest release, Shimmy Shimmy Dang!

== Discography ==
=== Albums ===
- Whiskey and Wine (self-released, 2007)
- Shimmy Shimmy Dang (Departure Records, 2011)
