= Ladybird of Szeged =

Hungarian robot finished in 1957

Ladybird of Szeged/ Ladybug of Szeged (Szegedi Katicabogár)
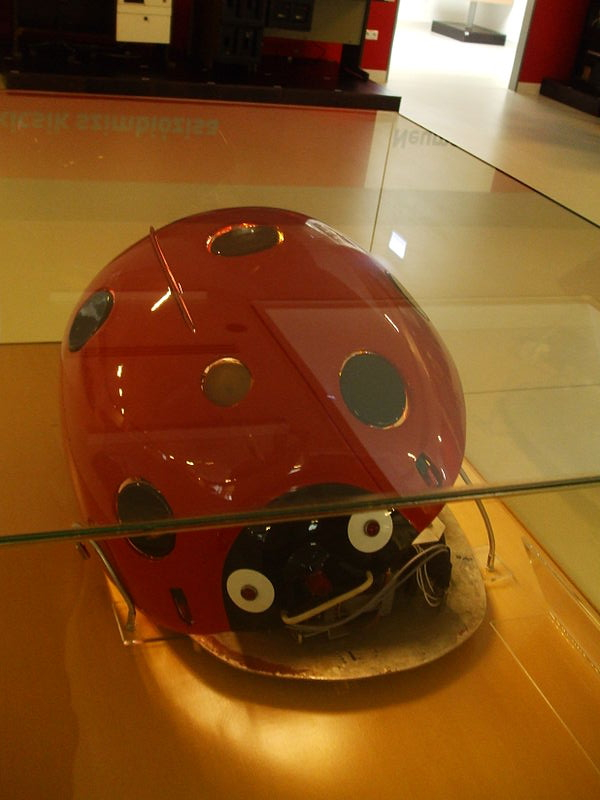
- The original Ladybird with a new shell
- Manufacturer: Cybernetics Laboratory of the University of Szeged (SZTE)
- Inventor: Dr. Dániel Muszka
- Country: Hungary
- Year of creation: 1956–1957 (69 years ago)
- Type: wheeled robot (phototrope)
- Purpose: technology demonstration
- Website: www.inf.u-szeged.hu/~csendes/katica/honlap/index.html

The Ladybird of Szeged or Ladybug of Szeged (Hungarian: Szegedi Katicabogár or just Szegedi Katica) is an early robot which was developed in Hungary at the Cybernetics Laboratory of the University of Szeged (SZTE) between 1956 and 1957. The roughly hemispherical machine has a red shell with black dots, resembling a ladybird (or ladybug), hence its name. The Ladybird is one of the first Hungarian robots, and the first robotic animal ever constructed. It was designed and built by Dr. Dániel Muszka, with the main intention of emulating Pavlovian conditional reflexes in a machine.

The original Ladybird is still in working condition (although its original papier-mâché shell has been replaced due to deterioration), and can be found in the Informatics History Exhibition (ITK) in Szeged. The exhibition have chosen the machine to be its symbolic mascot. Muszka built two working replicas of the robot in the 2000s, one is in the ITK as well, the other is in the Technical Study Stores of the Hungarian Technical and Transportation Museum (MMKM) in Budapest. The Ladybird is considered an early milestone in Hungarian cybernetics and information technology.

== Conception and name ==
Muszka was inspired to build a demonstration robot by the idea of psychologist József Király.

The machine is variously referred to as Szegedi Katicabogár (ladybird/ladybug of Szeged), Szegedi Katica (using a shorter word for ladybird) or just Katica (ladybird) in Hungarian sources, with various capitalizations. English-language sources tend to use either Ladybird (UK) or Ladybug (US), depending on the variety of English used. Nonetheless all of these names refer to the original robot, not to any of the replicas.

== Structure ==
The Ladybird is a roughly hemispherical robot which is 40 cm (16 in) wide, 25 cm (9.8 in) tall and 60 cm (24 in) long. It has a metal baseplate on which the electronics lie, which are enclosed by a red shell with black spots. This shell was originally varnished papier-mâché, but due to deterioration, the Ladybird now has a plastic shell mimicking the original one. The black spots themselves are buttons, and the top of the shell also has a small sliding vane. The robot has two red "eyes" (which can light up but can't see), three photosensors (which can detect light) and a mechanical sensor in the front to detect collisions with obstacles. It also contains an electromechanical buzzer to give audible feedback. Due to the technical difficulties of the time, Muszka couldn't include a battery, and so the Ladybird gets the required electricity (220 V alternating current from the mains) using an umbilical power cable. The machine has three rubber wheels, two fixed wheels in front which are driven by automobile windscreen wiper motors, and a free-rotating caster wheel at the back. By design, the Ladybird is incapable of going in reverse.

== Operation ==
The Ladybird emulates basic phototaxis as well as conditional and unconditional reflexes. Phototaxis is exhibited by the machine's rudimentary ability to "follow" a sufficiently strong light source which shines into its photosensors; the centre sensor turns on both motors to propel the robot forward, the left- and right-side sensors turn on only the opposite side's motor to effectively make the machine turn towards the light source. When turning or moving forward, the robot's "eyes" are fully alight, when it is stationary, they are just dimly lit.

Conditional reflexes are emulated by the Ladybird's ability to associate the "go" signal represented by the light source with a certain sound frequency (usually emitted by a nearby flute). If the front photosensor and the microphone both receives the right stimuli for a certain amount of time (the "eyes" are flashing during this time), the robot gains the ability to move forward just by "hearing" the right frequency of sound. This "memory" fades away with time (as capacitors drain out), or it can be erased by pressing any of the buttons (the black dots) on the shell.

Unconditional reflexes are emulated by the Ladybird's "refusal" to move in response to either light or sound stimuli when it "gets hurt", when any of its black dots are pressed. In this case it also "cries" using its buzzer, its "eyes" go fully dark, and it "forgets" about the conditioning. It can only be "soothed" and activated again by being "petted", by slightly pressing the sliding vane on top of the shell.

The Ladybird also "cries" and stops its motors when it hits an obstacle, such as the side walls of its demonstration pen.

The University of Szeged's Java simulation of the Ladybird accurately mirrors the behaviour of the actual machine, except that the simulated robot can go in reverse.

== Publicity ==
In the 1960s the Ladybird was featured multiple times on MTV (Magyar Televízió), then the only television channel in the People's Republic of Hungary.

In December 2011, the Science Museum, London hosted one of the replicas of the Ladybird in its 4-day Robotville Festival exhibition (also known as the Robotville^{EU} exhibition), along with modern robots of various kinds. The replica was presented by Muszka and his assistant, Csaba Gyuricza.

== See also ==
- William Grey Walter#Robots – Elmer and Elsie, two similar early robots, often referred to as "tortoises"
- BEAM robotics – the class of robotics the Ladybird belongs to
- Turtle (robot) – a modern class of simple robots, akin to the Ladybird
- Robot Man of Szeged – Muszka's other robot
