= El Intransigente =

Argentinian newspaper

El Intransigente.com
- Homepage
- Type: Daily newspaper
- Format: on-line
- Editor-in-chief: Ana Vallejo
- Founded: 1920
- Ceased publication: 1981
- Language: Spanish
- Headquarters: Buenos Aires, Argentina
- Website: www.elintransigente.com

The newspaper El Intransigente was published in the province of Salta, in Argentina, between 1920 and 1981. Its activity began on April 17, 1920 supervised by David Michel Torino, co-founder and owner of the newspaper. In its first years El Intransigente supported the national government of Hipólito Yrigoyen, but it became afterward a faithful interpreter of the popular aspiration and the regional reality.

== History ==
Its position of adamant criticism of abuses of power, particularly during the thirties, valued El Intransigente attacks and repeated penalties. Its passionate fight for freedom of the press and freedom of expression ended in June 1981. The origin of this closure, the differences in the direction and management of the newspaper, especially after the deaths of directors, Martin and David Michel Torino; Moreover, the institutional instability of the country had also contributed strongly to the definitive closure.

Twenty seven years later, El intransigente becomes again a reference in a press release online. Its headquarters are in Buenos Aires.

== Online edition ==
The on-line version of El Intransigente was launched on August 1, 2008. Since then, the newspaper did not stop increasing its number of visits. The editorial directives which decides the activity of the newspaper and which characterizes it institutionally are formulated in its slogan: información en estado puro (news, raw as it is)

El Intransigente.com offers its readers news from Argentina and from world live and continuously.

=== Online sections ===
• Argentina (Argentine) • Regional (Regions) • Mundo (World) • Sociales • Salud (Health) • Mujer (Women) • Espectáculo (Entertainment) • Deportes (Sports) • Cultura (Culture) • Editoriales (Editorials) • Policiales • Obituarios • Turismo (Travel)
