= Lenni-Kim =

Canadian singer (born 2001)

Lenni Kim
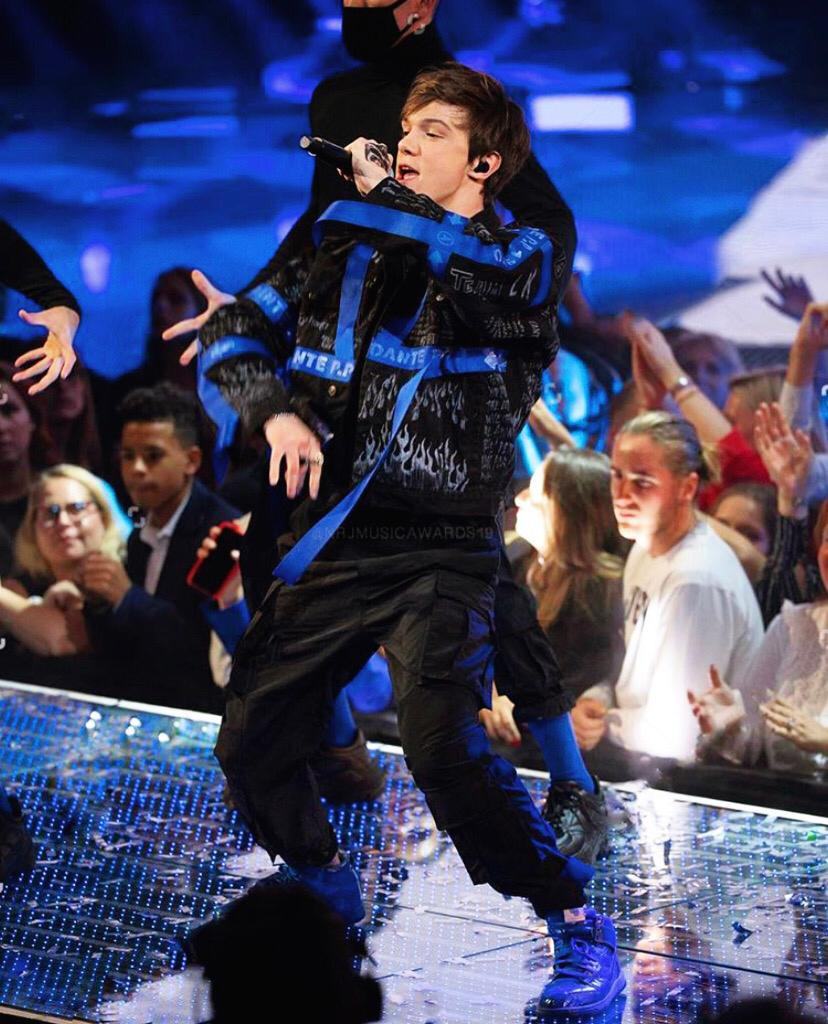
- Lenni-Kim in 2019
- Born: Lenni-Kim Lalande; September 8, 2001 (age 24); Montreal, Quebec, Canada
- Occupations: singer; actor
- Years active: 2015–present
- Musical career
- Genres: pop
- Instruments: vocals & piano
- Labels: Warner Music France; Parlophone
- Website: lennikim.com

Lenni-Kim Lalande (born September 8, 2001) is a Canadian singer.

== Biography ==
=== Early life ===
Lenni-Kim Lalande was born on September 8, 2001, in Montreal, Quebec, Canada. He is the only son of Guy Lalande and Myriam Landry.

From an early age, he imitated the singers he saw on television. At age eight, Lenni-Kim entered an advertising agency and then began to shoot advertisements and films in Quebec.

=== Career ===
In 2015, Lenni-Kim Lalande became known by participating in the second season of French TV show The Voice Kids, where he chose French singer Patrick Fiori as coach, but was eliminated from the battles. He then posted on the Internet several cover songs, including "Something Big" by Shawn Mendes and "Love Me Like You Do" by Ellie Goulding in duet with Phoebe Koyabe. To mark World Suicide Prevention Day, he launched the song "Pourquoi tout perdre", with a clip directed by Antoine Olivier Pilon and starring several actors including Marianne Verville, Alice Morel-Michaud, Camille Felton, Michaël Girard and Marc-François Blondi.

In 2017, he signed a contract with Warner Music France, which produced his album Les autres, released in June 2017. His clips, Yolo and Don't Stop have reached thirty-eight million views together, Don't Stop having recently reached twenty-four million views and Yolo reached fourteen million views.

He sang in duet with French singer Lou Jean the French credits of the second season of the series Miraculous: Tales of Ladybug & Cat Noir.

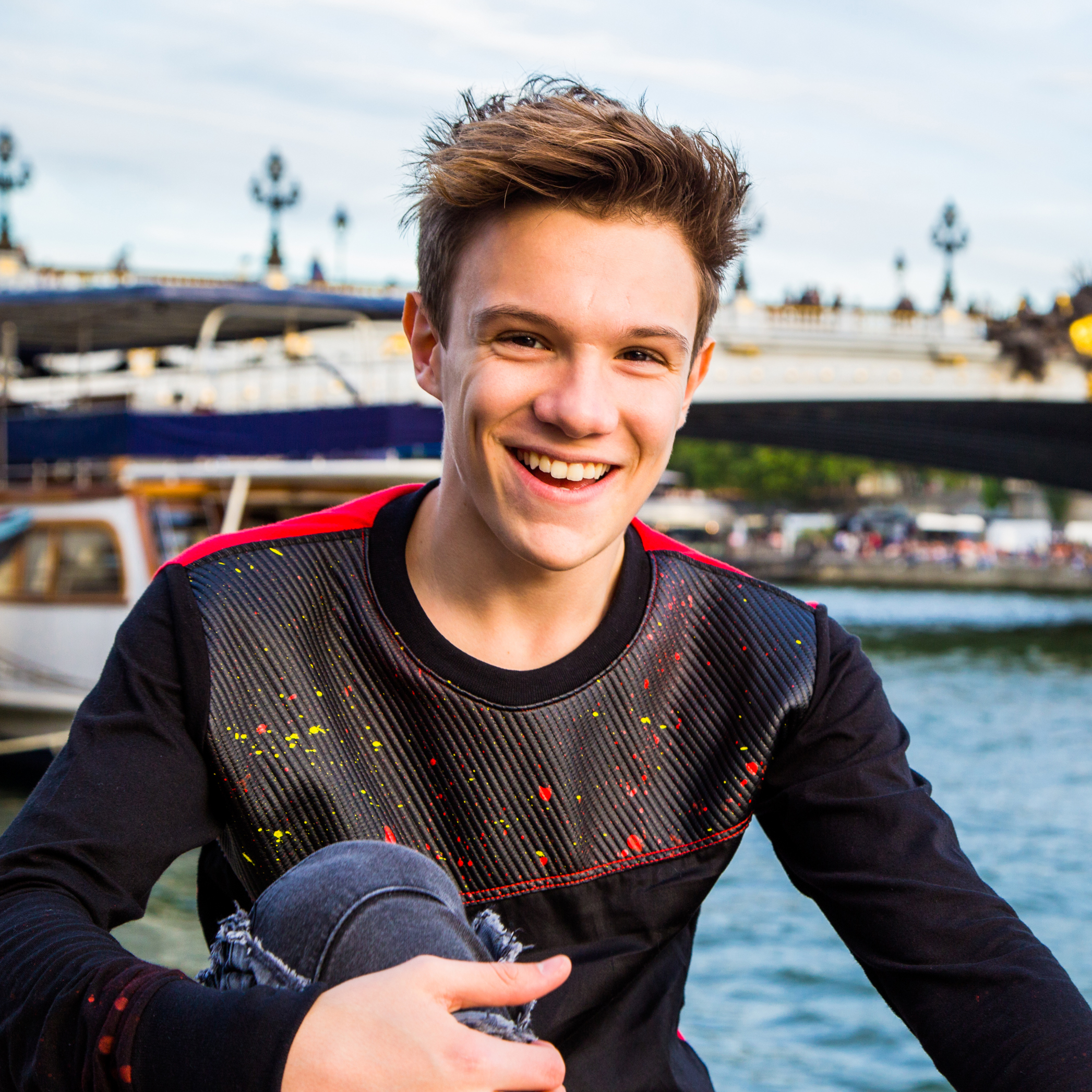
Lenni-Kim in Paris in 2017.

In the autumn of 2017, he participated in the eighth season of the French TV show Danse avec les stars on TF1, and finished second in the competition. Being sixteen years old at the time, he is the youngest candidate in the history of the show, all seasons combined.

He was nominated for the NRJ Music Awards in the Francophone Breakthrough of the Year category.

He participated in the Génération Enfoirés album (released on December 1, 2017) and at the Enfoirés Kids concert, recorded on November 19, 2017, and broadcast on December 1, 2017.

On February 16, 2018, he released a new clip for his song "Juste toi et moi", which reached six million views on YouTube.

In 2018, he starred in five episodes of the French TV series Tomorrow Is Ours on TF1, playing the role of Zac, a Quebec penfriend for the Moreno twins.

On September 1, 2018, he participated in the French program Fort Boyard, presented by Olivier Minne, alongside singer Tal, journalist Isabelle Morini-Bosc, presenter Guillaume Pley, actress Isabelle Vitari and comedian Jeanfi Janssens, for the French association Asperger Amitié.

On July 13, 2019, he participated for the second time in the French program Fort Boyard, for the association Les Bonnes Fées, alongside the Miss France 2019 Vaimalama Chaves, the general manager of the Society Miss France Sylvie Tellier, the actress and humorist Nicole Ferroni, singer Francis Lalanne and columnist Pierre-Jean Chalençon.

On May 24, 2019, he released the lead single Minuit, which reached 7,6 Million views on YouTube, for his first EP 18, which was released on September 13, 2019. The second single, 18-Unplugged was released on September 8, 2019, Lenni Kim’s 18th birthday.

He organized a series of tours in 2018–2019, in France, Belgium, Switzerland, Quebec (Canada) and Russia.

On March 5, 2020, he released his single called BAD BUZZ which was originally for his second album which was scrapped due to the pandemic.

In 2021 he released his single mélancolie and a Symphonic version for it as well, both videoclips together reached over a million views on YouTube.

Lenni Kim has begun to release some of the songs from his new EP, his very first EP entirely in English. The songs he has released so far (as of November 8th, 2024) are "Things I Want", "Scars", "Adrenaline", and "Homesick". "Things I Want" was released on November 8th of 2023, and has reached 88K views on YouTube. "Scars" was released on January 27th of 2024 and has reached just over 10K views on YouTube. "Adrenaline" was released on November 8th of 2024, and "Homesick" was released on January 17th, 2025. "Bad News" was released on March 25th of 2025.

== Discography ==
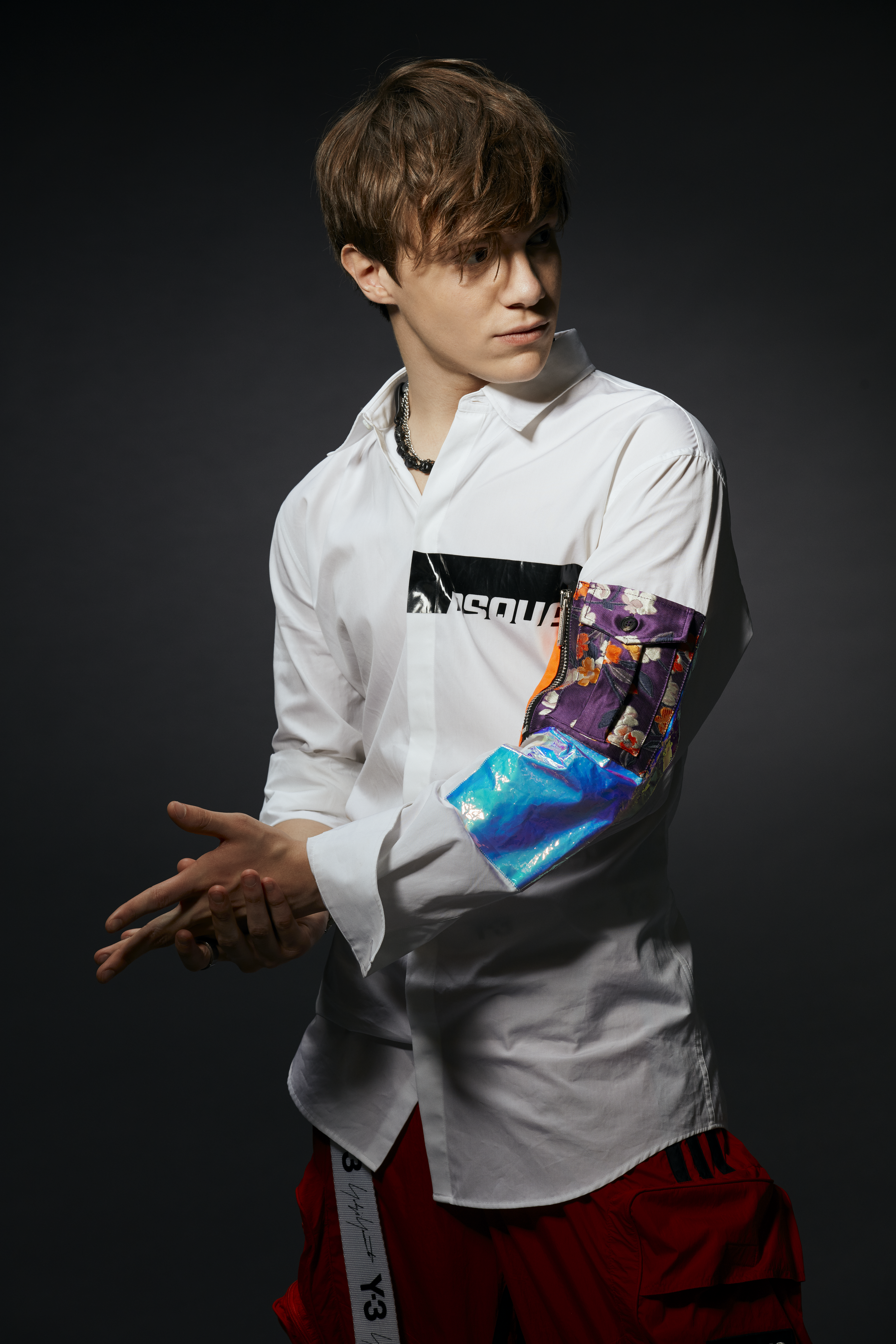
Lenni-Kim in 2019.

Lenni-Kim in 2019.

=== Album ===
- 2017: Les autres (Warner Music France)

=== EPs ===
- 2019: 18 (Parlophone)
- 2025: Adrenaline (independent)

=== Soundtrack ===
- 2024: Fem (Ugo Media)

=== Singles ===
- 2015: Pourquoi tout perdre
- 2017: Don't Stop
- 2017: Yolo
- 2017: Maylin
- 2017: Miraculous, with Lou Jean
- 2018: Juste toi et moi
- 2018: Still Waiting for You
- 2019: Minuit
- 2019: 18 - Unplugged
- 2019: Ce mur qui nous sépare, with Lou Jean
- 2020: Bad Buzz
- 2020: T'emballer
- 2021: Mélancolie
- 2021: Mélancolie (Symphonique)
- 2023: Things I Want
- 2024: Scars
- 2024: See Me Now
- 2024: Adrenaline
- 2025: Homesick
- 2025: Bad News
- 2026: Gas Station Lover

=== Tour ===
- 2018-2019: LK Tournée

== Filmography ==
=== Short film ===
- 2015: Pourquoi tout perdre, by Antoine Olivier Pilon: the boy

=== Movie ===
- 2016: A Pact Among Angels (Le Pacte des anges), by Richard Angers: William
- 2022: You Can Live Forever, by Sarah Watts & Mark Slutsky: Simon
- 2022: Snow Day: The Musical: Dancer (Paramount+)
- 2025: The Train (Le Train): Frank

=== TV series ===
- 2013: Les Beaux Malaises, on TVA: young Martin Matte
- 2015-2016: Fluffy Marky, on Télé-Québec: Jérôme
- 2018: Tomorrow Is Ours (Demain nous appartient), on TF1: Zac, Quebec penfriend for the Moreno twins
- 2020: Léo Matteï, Brigade des mineurs, on TF1 (season 7, episodes 1- 2): Lucas
- 2021: The Republic of Sarah, on The CW (1 episode): Hunter Cool Kid #1
- 2022: Transplant, on CTV (season 2, episode 1): Lucas
- 2023: Wong & Winchester (season 1, episode 5): Zander
- 2024: FEM, on Unis TV, Netflix: Zav

=== TV shows ===
- 2015: The Voice Kids (season 2), on TF1: candidate
- 2017: Danse avec les stars (season 8), on TF1: candidate
- 2017: Enfoirés Kids concert, on TF1: participating singer
- 2018: Fort Boyard, on France 2: candidate
- 2018: Vendredi tout est permis avec Arthur, on TF1: guest
- 2018: Baby-sitter : star incognito, on Gulli: the Quebec babysitter
- 2019: Fort Boyard, on France 2: candidate
- 2019: Danse avec les stars (season 10), on TF1: guest
- 2024: Zénith, on ICI Télé : candidate

=== Web shows ===
- 2022 : Lou et Sophie (Season 1): Will
- 2022 : Detox (Season 1, Episode 6): James

=== Clips ===
- 2014 : Aimer les monstres, Émile Proux-Cloutier
- 2015: Pourquoi tout perdre
- 2015: All I Want for Christmas Is You, cover of Mariah Carey's song
- 2017: Don't Stop
- 2017: Yolo
- 2017: Miraculous, with Lou
- 2018: Juste toi et moi
- 2019: Minuit
- 2019: Ce mur qui nous sépare, with Lou
- 2020: Bad Buzz
- 2021: Mélancolie
- 2021: Mélancolie - Symphonic Version
- 2023: Things I Want
- 2024: Scars

== Nominations ==
- 2017: NRJ Music Awards: Francophone Breakthrough of the Year.
- 2019: NRJ Music Awards: Francophone Breakthrough of the Year.
- 2019: Olympia Awards: Music Breakthrough of the Year.
- 2024 : Prix Gémeaux - "Meilleur premier rôle masculin : série dramatique".
