= Miraculous: Tales of Ladybug & Cat Noir =

2015 French animated superhero television series

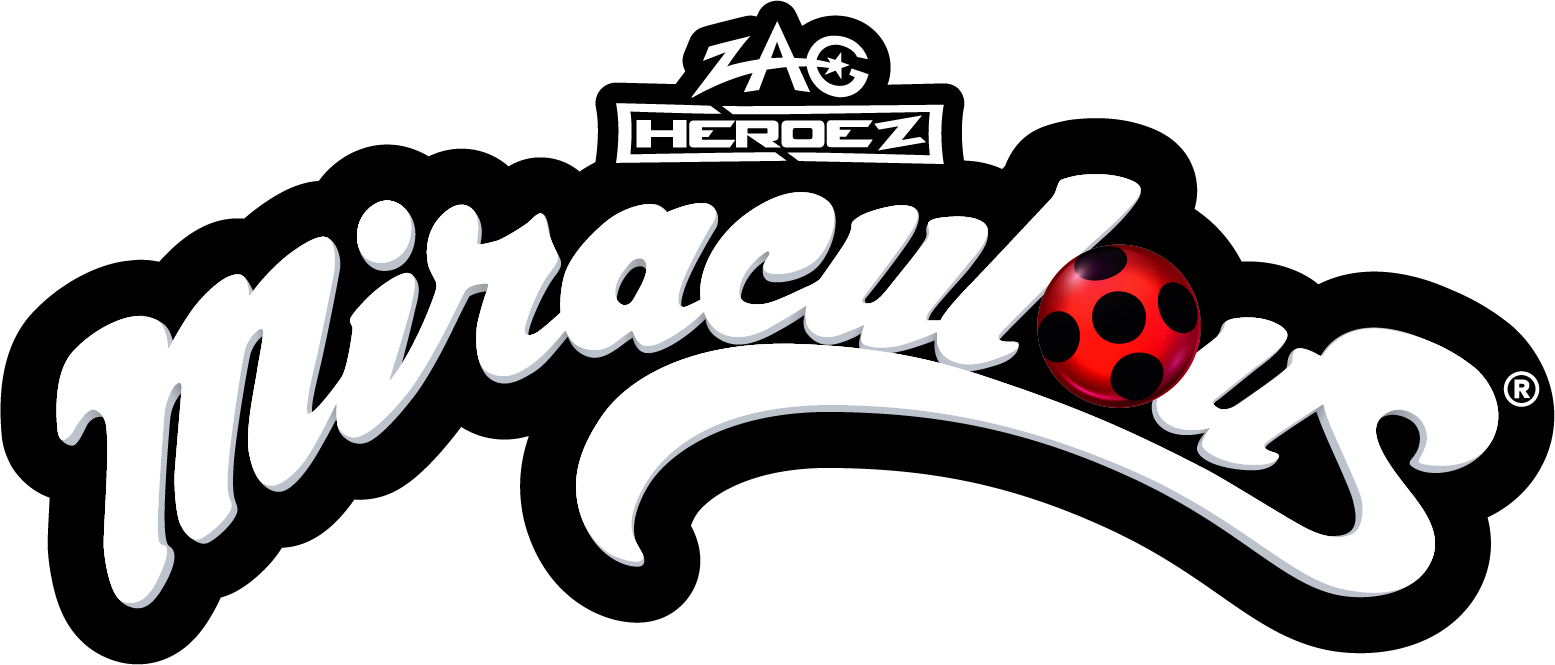
- Also known as: Miraculous
- French: Miraculous, les aventures de Ladybug et Chat Noir
- Genre: Superhero; Magical girl
- Created by: Thomas Astruc
- Developed by: Jeremy Zag
- Written by: Thomas Astruc; Sébastien Thibaudeau
- Directed by: Thomas Astruc; Wilfried Pain (S2–present); Christelle Abgrall (S2); Jeremy Paoletti (S2); Benoît Boucher (S2–3); Mr. Jun (S2–3)
- Voices of: Anouck Hautbois; Benjamin Bollen; Antoine Tomé; Marie Nonnenmacher; Thierry Kazazian; Fanny Bloc; Alexandre Nguyen; Marie Chevalot
- Theme music composer: Noam Kaniel; Lyrics: Alain Garcia
- Opening theme: "Miraculous" by Lou
- Ending theme: "Miraculous" (instrumental)
- Composers: Jeremy Zag; Noam Kaniel; Alain Garcia
- Country of origin: France
- Original language: French
- No. of seasons: 7
- No. of episodes: 163 (list of episodes)

Production
- Executive producers: Pascal Boutboul; Sébastien Thibaudeau; Jean-Yves Patay; Hiroyuki Kinoshita; Ryuji Kochi; Pierre Belletante; Suhoon Kim (S1–3); Stella Noh (S1–3); Alexandre Lippens (S1); Jared Wolfson (S1); Cédric Pilot (S1); François Lee (S2–3); Kevin Marciano (S2–3); Magali Bion (S2–3); Camille Oesch (S2–3)
- Producers: Jeremy Zag; Aton Soumache
- Running time: 22 minutes
- Production companies: ZAG Entertainment (Note: Credited as Zagtoon for the first five seasons.); Method Animation (S1–5) (Note: No longer produced since after season 5, but its parent company Mediawan is given an association credit); Miraculous Corp. (S6–present); Toei Animation Europe S.A.S. (S1–5); SAMG Entertainment (S1–3) (Note: Was no longer a co-producer since season 3, but still provided animation for some episodes until the end of season 5.); SK Broadband (S1–3); De Agostini Editore (S2–5); Gravity Animation, Inc. (S5); KidsMe S.r.l. (S6–present)

Original release
- Network: TF1 (TFOU); Gloob (S3–present); TFX (TFOU) (2024–present) (Note: Since 2024, TFOU is split into two parts from Monday to Friday, with the first part airing on TF1, and the second part on TFX. On Saturday and Sunday, the full block airs only on TF1.)
- Release: 19 October 2015 – present

Miraculous: Tales of Ladybug & Cat Noir (Note: It is commonly abbreviated as Miraculous Ladybug or simply Miraculous) (French: Miraculous, les aventures de Ladybug et Chat Noir) is a French animated superhero television series created by Thomas Astruc and developed by Jeremy Zag. The series is produced by the French company Miraculous Corp. (a joint venture of Mediawan and ZAG Entertainment), and co-produced with Japanese studio Toei Animation's European division, as well as several international companies. (Note: Co-produced with Italian company De Agostini Editore since season 2, with seasons 1 to 3 co-produced with South Korean's companies SAMG Entertainment and SK Broadband, season 4 with Brazilian TV channel Gloob, season 5 with Indian company Gravity Animation Inc., and season 6 with Italian company KidsMe S.r.l. All seasons are produced with the financial participation of The Walt Disney Company France, Dentsu, TF1 Group, and AB Droits Audiovisuels, and seasons 1 and 2 with EBS.)

The series focuses on two Parisian teenagers, Marinette Dupain-Cheng and Adrien Agreste, who transform into the superheroes Ladybug and Cat Noir, respectively, to protect the city from supervillains created by their main antagonist, Hawk Moth.

Before its debut in France on 19 October 2015, on TF1/TFX's TFOU block, the series was first shown in South Korea on 1 September 2015, on EBS1. Internationally, it is mainly broadcast on Disney-owned channels or on Disney+, with exceptions in some countries.

The series spawned a media franchise with several products tied to it, including various comic books, novels, and video games. A film adaptation, Ladybug & Cat Noir: The Movie, was released theatrically in 2023, premiering in France.

== Plot ==
The series takes place in modern-day Paris and revolves around the adventures of two teenagers, Marinette Dupain-Cheng and Adrien Agreste. When evil arises, they use magical jewelry known as the "Miraculous" to transform into their superhero personas, Ladybug and Cat Noir, respectively. Marinette and Adrien struggle with their feelings for each other, not knowing each other's secret identities: Marinette is in love with Adrien, but not Cat Noir, while Adrien is in love with Ladybug, but not Marinette.

Their main enemy is the supervillain Hawk Moth, whose real identity, unknown to the heroes, is Adrien's father, Gabriel Agreste. Using the Butterfly Miraculous, he creates akumas, butterflies infused with negative energy, to "akumatize" ordinary Parisians when they experience negative emotions. This grants him control over them and turns them into supervillains. His goal is to steal Ladybug's and Cat Noir's Miraculous, intending to use their combined power to wish his wife, Emilie, back to life, who fell into a coma by using the damaged Peacock Miraculous before the events of the series. He is sometimes aided by his assistant Nathalie Sancoeur, who uses the Peacock Miraculous to create sentimonsters, magical lifeforms with a seemingly endless variety of forms and abilities.

As Hawk Moth's villains grow stronger, Master Fu, the Guardian of the Miraculous, permits Marinette to borrow additional Miraculous and enlist her classmates and friends as superheroes. Hawk Moth eventually exposes Master Fu, forcing the latter to make Marinette the new Guardian. Nathalie falls ill from using the damaged Peacock Miraculous, but Hawk Moth repairs it and uses it together with the Butterfly Miraculous to become "Shadow Moth", able to create both akumas and sentimonsters.

At the end of the fourth season, Gabriel, adopting the new supervillain name "Monarch", gains control of almost all of the Miraculous, leaving Ladybug and Cat Noir once again as the only two heroes. A battle with the heroes leaves Gabriel with magical damage that slowly spreads through his body. Adrien eventually lets go of his crush on Ladybug and instead falls in love with Marinette, leading to them starting a romantic relationship (still ignorant of each other's secret identities). After a final battle with Marinette at the end of season 5, Gabriel seizes the Ladybug and Cat Miraculous and makes his wish; having had a change of heart, he wishes to revive Nathalie at the cost of his own life and asks Marinette not to let Adrien find out that he was a villain. Marinette recovers most of the Miraculous and gives them into the custody of her friends, unaware that Lila Rossi, a former classmate who became her nemesis, has claimed the Butterfly Miraculous for herself.

In the sixth season, Marinette struggles with the morality of hiding the truth of Gabriel's villainy from Adrien and the world. Lila, adopting the supervillain name "Chrysalis", is aiming to discover Ladybug's true identity and begins to direct akuma-powered villains of her own against Ladybug, Cat Noir, and their team of superheroes – the Miraculers. It is revealed that Chrysalis can shapeshift into anyone including one of the superheroes.

In the seventh season, Marinette breaks up with Adrien, as the two continue to hunt down Chrysalis with the others.

== Episodes ==
Series	Episodes	Originally released	
Series	Episodes	First released	Last released
1	26	19 October 2015	30 October 2016
2	26	11 December 2016	18 November 2018
3	26	14 April 2019	8 December 2019
4	26	11 April 2021	13 March 2022
5	27	17 October 2022	1 November 2023
6	26	23 March 2025	11 October 2026
7	26	1 November 2026	TBA

== Production ==
=== Conception and creation ===
The series is based on an original concept created by French writer and storyboarder Thomas Astruc. He was inspired by a meeting with a certain lady and "decades of comics binge reading". In an interview with Nolife, Astruc said he was working as an animator on the show W.I.T.C.H. when he met a woman wearing a T-shirt with a ladybug on it. They began to share drawings, some of which were ladybug-themed. Astruc also noted that Marinette's signature pigtail hairstyle was fashioned after the woman. They also worked on the cartoon A.T.O.M. around 2004–05. Astruc first drew Ladybug on sticky notes and remarked about how strong the Ladybug character was. He had no memories of seeing ladybug-themed superheroes in comics.

Astruc had intended to make Ladybug a comic book series until he met Jeremy Zag, who loved the project and wanted to produce it as a cartoon; Zag was 25 at the time and not originally from the cartoon industry.

In developing Cat Noir, Astruc said that ladybugs represented good luck, so it was natural to partner her with a black cat character with bad luck powers. Cat Noir was a tribute to comic characters like Catwoman, so it was like having Catwoman and Spider-Man in the same show, but reversed genders and roles.

A character named Félix was originally going to have the role of Cat Noir, as the holder of the Black Cat Miraculous, with Plagg as his owner. but he was later scrapped in favour of Adrien Agreste who is the current holder of the Black Cat Miraculous alongside Plagg, because the creative team felt that Félix was a cliché of a male anime protagonist and that Adrien would allow them to tell more interesting stories. In September 2015, Astruc indicated that he was open to revisiting the character of Félix, but he abandoned it by February 2016, writing that the character was a poor idea. In 2019, Félix was remade as Adrien's cousin and was renamed Félix Fathom, and as of March 2022, became the holder of the Peacock Miraculous with Dusuu as his kwami.

=== Production companies ===
In 2010, the show was announced at Cannes' MIPCOM with French production companies Univergroup Pictures and Onyx Films heading the project and working with Method Animation and Zagtoon. Aton Soumache of Onyx and Method said that they want "to create a glamorous superhero character with a real European flair with Paris as [the] backdrop." The producers had also planned to animate it in stereoscopic 3D (currently, the show is produced using CGI animation).

In June 2012, Toei Animation, an animation studio owned by the Japanese film company, Toei Company, was announced as a co-producer, alongside its European division. Two years earlier, Toei had released a Pretty Cure film set in Paris, France, and the studio was interested in expanding its international audience. Even after the production moved to CGI animation, Toei remained a co-producer and partner, with executive producers from the company remaining credited until Seasons 1-5, and the manga.

On 21 November 2012, a memorandum of understanding between Zagtoon, Method Animation, SAMG Animation and SK Broadband was announced: together, the companies would invest US$50 million through 2017 into five projects. The first of these projects was developed into Miraculous, which received an investment of $10 million. As a part of the deal, SK Broadband would have exclusive rights in South Korea for video on demand release, available to the subscribers of the company's IPTV platform B TV.

In 2019, Zag and Gloob signed an agreement where the Brazilian company would start to co-produce the next seasons of Miraculous, in addition to having exclusivity of exhibition in Brazil and the addition of a Brazilian character.

=== Animation ===
When Toei Animation and its European division joined as co-producers in the summer of June 2012, it was also announced that the show would be drawn in a colourful manga-like style. Later in September, Zagtoon, Method, & Toei released a traditionally-animated promotional video for Miraculous Ladybug. The video featured Marinette (in different clothes similar to the clothes in the current series) as the current holder of the Ladybug Miraculous, Ladybug, and a (now-scrapped, later Adrien's cousin) different character named Félix the holder of the Black Cat Miraculous as Cat Noir, Marinette and Félix's Kwamis, Tikki and Plagg, Hawk Moth/Gabriel (without the mask and with a different outfit, look, and lair compared to the current series), and also two akumatized villains from season 1 in the current show – The Mime and Mr. Pigeon. Their Miraculouses and their transformation sequences had different designs compared to the Miraculouses and the transformations in the current series. The demo song from the promotional music video was performed & composed by Noam, who would later compose, produce music and perform songs for the current series.

The whole anime concept was a complete success, but there were concerns about the marketability of traditional 2D animation and the difficulty in animating Ladybug's costume of red with black spots, as it caused some strobing effects. Executive producer Jared Wolfson said that Zag wanted the animation to be cinematic and epic, unique and different, and said that they are continuing to partner with Toei as it brings in the Asian inspiration and that a 2D version of the show might be a potential product for future purposes, but later, the anime concept was reused in the current series that exists as a movie in the main universe.

The aforementioned problem with 2D animation was resolved by moving to CGI animation; the switch also allowed for easier implementation of mobile camera angles. SAMG Animation (later SAMG Entertainment), a CGI animation studio located in South Korea, which officially joined the production in the fall of November 2012, produced modelling and animation. Zag later recalled that SAMG was chosen for quality reasons in a video message he sent to a South Korean press conference held in 2015 by the Seoul-based company. Astruc and assistant director, Wilfried Pain, instructed the animators not to improvise scenes so that they could keep things consistent and understandable. Pain estimated about 350–400 shots are used in a typical 20-minute episode; with 10 panels per shot, that makes up to 4000 panels per episode. Wolfson said that the show's animation brings dynamic camera angles and texturing. A trailer with the new, current CGI-animated style was released in October 2013, a year later.

On 22 January 2018, Zag posted on Instagram that the crew was working on season 4 and season 5. In September 2019, it was confirmed by Zag that the air date for season 4 was slated for late 2020, but this was pushed to 2021, due to the COVID-19 pandemic.

On 18 April 2021, it was confirmed that in addition to seasons 4 and 5, the show will have two more seasons (season 6 and 7). Season 6, which was confirmed to switch the series from Autodesk Maya to Unreal Engine 5, was initially expected to launch sometime between fall or winter 2024.

In July 2022, an eighth season was greenlit.

=== Themes, writing, and process ===
While the show is marketed as a Western superhero narrative, its thematic base is the Japanese mahō shōjo (magical girl) genre, with its focus on transformation sequences, a school cast, the gathering of a team of heroes, animal friends, and end-of-episode collages. In particular, Ladybug is strongly influenced by the genre's landmark entry Sailor Moon: Not only does the name of Marinette ("little sailor girl") recall Sailor Moon's title, but the main characters' magical companions reflect Sailor Moon's Luna and Artemis, the main villain's power resembles that of Queen Beryl, and the show's entire plot parallels the story of Sailor Saturn. Ladybug features numerous other direct and indirect references to its inspiration.

The concept for the show originally dealt with political themes, geared towards teens and young adults. However, after failing to gain traction with networks, it was retooled for a younger target audience. Astruc said that he is delighted that the show can reach younger and older people.

Each episode takes around 3 months to write, from scratch to final validation by broadcasters. Assistant director, Wilfried Pain, said that each episode is composed of two parts: a sitcom aspect where the characters have to speak for themselves, and an action element where the camera is always moving.

Noam Kaniel writes, composes and performs the music and songs. Kaniel has also worked on action superhero shows such as She-Ra, M.A.S.K (French theme song), X-Men, Code Lyoko (English theme song), W.I.T.C.H., Fantastic Four, Power Rangers, Digimon Fusion and Glitter Force (Smile PreCure!). Kaniel and Zag wrote the theme song. Alain Garcia wrote the English lyrics, which are sung by Wendy Child and Cash Calloway. The French version was performed by Marily and Noam Kaniel. Starting from season 4, Lou performed the theme song in both French and English.

== Release ==
Astruc's representatives have said that the show has reached over 120 countries.

In France, TV channels or streaming services owners are required to participate in the financing of French productions. Since The Walt Disney Company owns TV channels and a streaming service in France, they finance the series through their French division which gives Disney the broadcasting rights in select European, Latin American, Middle Eastern, Asian, and African regions, where the series airs on Disney-owned channels or Disney+. It also gives them the reruns rights on the French versions of Disney Channel and Disney+. In the United States, the series originally debuted on Nickelodeon and Netflix; since 2019, Disney subsequently took over all rights to release the series in the United States.

In countries where the series is not broadcast on Disney-owned channels or services, it airs on local networks or cable TV channels.

=== Europe ===
- In France, the series is broadcast on TF1 during the TFOU programming block. Since 2024, TFOU is split into two parts from Monday to Friday, with the first part airing on TF1, and the second on TFX. On Saturday and Sunday, the full block airs only on TF1. Episodes premiere either on TF1 or on TFX, depending on the day of broadcast. Reruns airs on Disney Channel, while Netflix, Disney+ and MyTF1max/TF1+ share the streaming rights. It premiered on 19 October 2015 on TF1. Season 2 premiered with a Christmas special in December 2016 with further new episodes on TFOU on 26 October 2017 and other channels throughout Europe. Netflix began streaming the series, starting with the Christmas special, on 20 December 2016. Season 3 premiered on 14 April 2019. In France, the fourth season premiered in April 2021, and on Disney Channel US in June 2021. The sixth season premiered on 23 March 2025 in France.
- In the United Kingdom, the show premiered on 30 January 2016 on Disney Channel (and aired until its closure on 1 October 2020); and premiered in February 2017 on Pop. Beginning with the fifth season, the series has aired on CBBC and BBC iPlayer. A Welsh language version is also broadcast on S4C.
- The world premiere of season 3 was in Spain on Disney Channel on 1 December 2018.
- Among the free-to-air terrestrial television broadcasters in the Republic of Ireland, RTÉ premiered the show in 2021 on RTÉ2's teenage programming block in English; the series' Irish language dub would later premiere on TG4 in late September 2022.

=== Americas ===
- In the United States, the series originally debuted on Nickelodeon on December 6, 2015. Nickelodeon broadcast the first season before it was removed from the network's schedule in 2016 (the company lost broadcast rights after reruns Nicktoons in 2017). The show aired the first season and premiered the second season on the children's television programming block KidsClick from July 3, 2017 to March 29, 2019. This would make the show available on terrestrial television stations, but the block was ended on March 31, 2019 due to low ratings. On April 8, 2019, Disney Channel acquired the rights to broadcast the first two seasons with the third season being aired starting June 1, 2020 and ending December 5 with the episode "Christmaster". Disney Branded Television later acquired the exclusive rights to stream the series & TV specials on their sister service, Disney+ worldwide (excluding Brazil & China). Canada later got the series on the service. Disney Channel would premiere all of these seasons and specials first. In December 2016, Zag announced that Netflix had acquired USA video-on-demand streaming rights to Miraculous for seasons 1–3. The first three seasons were available on Netflix until February 1, 2023, when they (and the Miraculous Webi-sodes) were added to Disney+. The sixth season and beyond would premiere simultaneously between Disney Channel & Disney XD US starting January 25, 2025 (later added to Disney+).
- In Canada, the show premiered in French on 9 January 2016 on Télé-Québec, a provincial public service television network in Quebec. The series was broadcast in English on Family Channel starting on 1 November 2016.
- In Hispanic America, the show premiered on 16 May 2016 on Disney Channel.
- In Brazil, the show premiered on 7 March 2016 on Gloob. It also streams on Globoplay, a streaming service that is owned by Gloob's parent company, Grupo Globo. The fourth season premiere, "Furious Fu", was aired in Brazil on Gloob in March 2021.The seventh season premiered on October 30, 2026.

=== Asia-Pacific ===
- Prior to its debut in France in October 2015 on TF1, South Korea was the first country to premiere the series; the Korean version was originally titled Ladybug, with girl group Fiestar singing its translated theme song. It premiered on 1 September 2015 on EBS1 and ran for 13 episodes until November 2015, with repeats through February 2016, and the second half of the season began airing on 1 March 2016. SK Broadband, having participated in the production, provided the episodes on video on demand exclusively to subscribers of their IPTV platform B TV, about a half-hour following the South Korean broadcast of each one on EBS1. Disney Channel also aired the series from 7 December 2015 to 30 September 2021.
- In New Zealand, the show premiered on 27 April 2016 on TVNZ's TV2.
- In Australia, the show premiered on 22 March 2016 on ABC Me.
- In Japan, Disney Channel streamed the episode "Stormy Weather" through its mobile application on 1 July 2018 before the official premiere on 23 July of the same year.
- It premiered in Southeast Asia on Disney Channel on 6 November 2018. It aired until 30 September 2021, when the channel closed on 1 October 2021 and moved to Disney+.
- In Pakistan, the show was telecast by Kids Zone Pakistan with the Urdu dub in April 2019; the second season first aired on 22 October 2021, the third on 3 May 2022, and the fourth on 31 December 2022.
- In India, the first five seasons aired on 29 April 2019, 14 December 2020, 12 April 2021, 9 May 2022 and 12 June 2023 respectively on Disney Channel. The "Miraculous World" TV specials also aired on the same channel, with the New York special airing on 9 May 2021 and the Shanghai special airing on 14 November 2021.
- In Indonesia, the first season was aired by Trans7 from 2019 until July 2021 on a graveyard slot.

=== Home media ===
==== Region 1 ====
In the United States and Canada, the first DVD, featuring seven episodes from season one, with both English and French audio tracks, was released on 3 May 2016 by Shout! Factory.

A second DVD, subtitled Spots On!, which contains six episodes, was released on 30 August 2016.

A third DVD, Be Miraculous, which contains seven episodes (including the two-part prequel), was released on 10 January 2017.

A fourth DVD, It's Ladybug, was released on 11 April 2017.

A fifth DVD, Miraculous: Tales of Ladybug & Cat Noir: Season One, was released on 6 February 2018; this is a rerelease of all 4 previous DVDs on one set.

===== Main series =====
Region 1
Season	DVD title	Episode count	Aspect ratio	Total running time	Release date
1	"Miraculous: Tales of Ladybug & Cat Noir"	7	16:9	132 minutes	3 May 2016
1	"Miraculous: Tales of Ladybug & Cat Noir: Spots On!"	6	16:9	132 minutes	16 August 2016
1	"Miraculous: Tales of Ladybug & Cat Noir: Be Miraculous"	7	16:9	154 minutes	10 January 2017
1	"Miraculous: Tales of Ladybug & Cat Noir: It's Ladybug"	6	16:9	132 minutes	11 April 2017
1	"Miraculous: Tales of Ladybug & Cat Noir: Season One"	26	16:9	540 minutes	6 February 2018

==== Region 2 ====
In the UK, the first DVD, featuring 4 DVD episodes from season 1 called Miraculous: Tales of Ladybug and Cat Noir: Lady Wifi & Other Stories Vol 1 in English was released on 17 July 2017 by Spirit Entertainment.

A second DVD, Miraculous: Tales of Ladybug and Cat Noir – Kung Food & Other Stories Vol 2, was released on 6 November 2017.

A third DVD, Miraculous: Tales of Ladybug and Cat Noir – Princess Fragrance & Other Stories Vol 3, was released on 12 February 2018.

A fourth DVD, Miraculous: Tales of Ladybug and Cat Noir – Volpina & Other Stories Vol 4, which contains seven episodes (including the two-part prequel), was released on 21 May 2018.

A fifth DVD, Miraculous: Tales of Ladybug & Cat Noir: Season One, was released on 17 September 2018.

In the UK, the second batch of DVD episodes, featuring 5 episodes from season 2, dubbed Miraculous: Tales of Ladybug and Cat Noir – Gigantian & Other Stories, was released on 7 October 2019.

A DVD called Miraculous: Tales of Ladybug & Cat Noir – A Christmas Special, featuring episodes from Season 2, was released on 11 November 2019.

A DVD called Miraculous: Tales of Ladybug & Cat Noir – Gorizilla & Other Stories, featuring episodes from Season 2, was released on 17 February 2020.

A DVD called Miraculous: Tales of Ladybug & Cat Noir – Sandboy & Other Stories, featuring episodes from Season 2, was released on 4 May 2020.

A DVD called Miraculous: Tales of Ladybug & Cat Noir – Queen Wasp & Other Stories, featuring episodes from Season 2, was released on 13 July 2020.

A fifth DVD, Miraculous: Tales of Ladybug & Cat Noir: Season Two, was released on 14 September 2020.

In 2023, Dazzler Media launched a new sublabel, is the home to Dazzler's dedicated coming from children's new physical media and digital label Dazzler Kids signed a deal with Zag Inc. to secure the United Kingdom DVD and digital download rights to Miraculous: Tales of Ladybug & Cat Noir, Power Players and Ghostforce.

===== Main series =====
Region 2
Season	DVD title	Episode count	Aspect ratio	Total running time	Release date
1	"Miraculous: Tales of Ladybug and Cat Noir: Lady Wifi & Other Stories Vol 1"	7	16:9	180 minutes	17 July 2017
1	"Miraculous: Tales of Ladybug and Cat Noir – Kung Food & Other Stories Vol 2"	7	16:9	180 minutes	6 November 2017
1	"Miraculous: Tales of Ladybug and Cat Noir – Princess Fragrance & Other Stories Vol 3"	6	16:9	180 minutes	12 February 2018
1	"Miraculous: Tales of Ladybug and Cat Noir – Volpina & Other Stories Vol 4"	6	16:9	130 minutes	21 May 2018
1	"Miraculous: Tales of Ladybug & Cat Noir: Season One"	26	16:9	650 minutes	17 September 2018
2	"Miraculous: Tales of Ladybug and Cat Noir – Gigantian & Other Stories"	7	16:9	182 minutes	7 October 2019
2	"Miraculous: Tales of Ladybug and Cat Noir – A Christmas Special"	1	16:9	25 minutes	11 November 2019
2	"Miraculous: Tales of Ladybug and Cat Noir – Gorizilla & Other Stories"	7	16:9	182 minutes	17 February 2020
2	"Miraculous: Tales of Ladybug and Cat Noir – Sandboy & Other Stories"	6	16:9	182 minutes	4 May 2020
2	"Miraculous: Tales of Ladybug and Cat Noir – Queen Wasp & Other Stories"	6	16:9	182 minutes	13 July 2020
2	"Miraculous: Tales of Ladybug & Cat Noir: Season Two"	26	16:9	562 minutes	14 September 2020

== Cultural impact and reception ==
=== Critical reception ===
Kimberly Cooper, a blog writer who has contributed to news media such as The Huffington Post, wrote that the show has inspired teens and adults to create and propagate Miraculous remixes and liked that the show featured multiracial characters as with the film Big Hero 6, which had won an Oscar. She "quickly realized there was a far cooler and broader Miraculous movement underway". Caitlin Donovan of the entertainment website, Epicstream, listed it as one of her top 10 animated series of 2015. She wrote that "the characters are so charming that the tropey aspects of the show are merely a lot of fun, rather than irritating" and commended the fight sequences and CGI animation. She wrote that "Marinette is an adorable lead who is genuinely awkward as a civilian, but confident as a superhero, which makes for an interesting contrast." Ella Anders of BSCKids wrote that the show stands out because of "how it meshes both the magical girl and superhero genre together". Robert Lloyd of the Los Angeles Times described the show as "clever, romantic, fun, the way some of us prefer our superhero stories." He found the characters to "have the look of extruded plastic common to CGI cartoons", but "within these limits the design is lovely and the animation elegant, and a lot of work has gone into the staging and execution of the action scenes."

The North American Precis Syndicate called the show "authentic and aspirational – a story of today's modern everygirl superhero who comes to life. The series, about a young girl who taps into her superhero powers and innocent optimism to save Paris from the evil Hawk Moth, will no doubt inspire today's youth to try to save the day, every day in their own way." Andrea Reiher of Zap2It wrote that the "storylines are rich with family, friends, adventure, intrigue, villains, creativity and more, delivering themes that are relatable and relevant to kids and preteens" and anticipated it would be a huge hit on Nickelodeon.

The show has also received negative criticism from both critics and fans of the show, with common criticisms stemming from its inconsistent writing, slow plot progression, and messy handling of its characters. Ryan Lewis of CBR.com portrays a negative view of the show's primary conflict between the two main protagonists:

They know each other outside of crime-fighting but somehow never recognize each other's superhero identities. To the annoyance of many fans, this conflict is yet to be resolved, causing some to lose interest in the show for its overly drawn-out romantic tension.

Several media reviewers anticipated "Miraculous toys to be among the hot superheroine properties for 2016". Zag has partnered with Bandai to release Miraculous-based toys as well as deals to make Miraculous-brand clothing and other merchandise.

=== Awards and nominations ===
Year	Award	Category	Nominee	Result
2016	Brazilian Toy Magazine Awards	Best National Toy of 2016	Miraculous	Won
2016	Brazilian Toy Magazine Awards	Best Brand of 2016	Miraculous	Won
2016	Ri Happy Awards	Best Brand of 2016	Miraculous	Won
2016	Latam Expo Licensing Awards	Best Brand of 2016	Miraculous	Won
2017	Brazilian Toy Magazine Awards	Best National Toy 2017	Miraculous	Won
2017	Licencias de Actualidad	Best License of the Year	Miraculous	Won
2017	Licencias de Actualidad	Best Entertainment License	Miraculous	Won
2017	Licencias de Actualidad	Best Promotion	Tosta Rica Ladybug	Won
2017	2017 OVA-ies TV Animation Awards	Best Animated Main Character of 2017	Marinette Dupain-Cheng	Nominated
2017	2017 OVA-ies TV Animation Awards	Best Visuals for an Animated Show of 2017	Miraculous Ladybug	Nominated
2018	Teen Choice Awards	Choice Animated TV Show	Miraculous	Won
2018	The UK Licensing Awards 2018	Best Children's or Tween Licensed Property	Miraculous	Nominated
2018	The UK Licensing Awards 2018	Best Licensed Children's Apparel Range	Miraculous Nightwear for Character.com from Aykroyd and Sons	Nominated
2018	Brazilian Toy Magazine Awards	Best National Toy 2018	Miraculous	Won
2018	Bologna Licensing Trade Fair	Best Property Kids	Miraculous	Won
2018	2018 OVA-ies TV Animation Awards	Best Animation Main Character of 2018	Marinette Dupain-Cheng	Won
2018	2018 OVA-ies TV Animation Awards	Best Animation Supporting Character of 2018	Hawk Moth	Nominated
2019	Bologna Licensing Trade Fair	Special Award Fashion Kids with Miraculous by Guess	Miraculous	Won
2019	Tell-Tale TV Awards	Favourite Animated TV Series	Miraculous	Won
2020	Bologna Licensing Awards	Best Preschool Licensing Project	Capsule Collection Chicco Miraculous	Won
2020	BroadwayWorld Spain Awards	Best Theatrical Event	musical Miraculous: The Ladybug Show	Won
2020	Kids' Choice Awards Mexico	Best Animated Series of the Year	Miraculous	Won
2021	Kid's Choice Awards Brazil	Favorite Cartoon	Miraculous: As Aventuras da Ladybug	Won
2022	Kidscreen Awards 2022	Best Alternative Game (Kids)	Miraculous RP: Quests of Ladybug & Cat Noir	Won
2023	Kidscreen Awards 2023	Best Animated Series (Kids)	Miraculous	Won
2025	Molotov TV Awards	Best Animation		Won
2026	Kidscreen Awards 2026	Best YouTube Channel		Nominated
2026	Kidscreen Awards 2026	Best Holiday or Special Episode		Nominated
2027	Kidscreen Awards 2027	Best Special Episode or TV Movie	Miraculous World: Tokyo, Stellar Force	Pending

== Other media ==
=== Spin-offs ===
A spin-off series, Miraculous Chibi, premiered on 31 August 2018, on YouTube and on major broadcast channels, and since late 2019 on Disney Channel Latin America.

Another spin-off titled Miraculous Stellar Force was announced to be released in 2027.

=== Film ===
In September 2018, Jeremy Zag announced an animated film adaptation of Miraculous. Production started after the production of the fourth and fifth seasons of the television series. With a budget of €80 million, it is one of the most expensive French films ever made, with the first being Valerian and the City of a Thousand Planets.

Titled Ladybug & Cat Noir: The Movie, the film explores the origins of the franchise. It was released on July 5, 2023, by SND.

Miraculous: Ladybug & Cat Noir, The Movie 2 is an animated sequel to the 2023 film that is expected to be released in 2027. Zag is set to return as director, and the original voice cast is expected to return.

=== Stage musical ===
In 2021, a stage musical adaptation titled Miraculous Ladybug: Le spectacle musical (transl. Miraculous Ladybug: The Musical Show) was announced. The musical was originally set to premiere on 21 December 2021, at the Dôme de Paris. However, it was postponed due to the COVID-19 pandemic. It premiered on 20 December 2022 at the Dôme de Paris, where it was played until 1 January 2023. After that, the show went on tour in France, and in French-speaking areas of Belgium and Switzerland.

=== Manga adaptation ===
On 6 December 2020, Zag announced that a manga adaptation will begin serialization in Kodansha's Monthly Shōnen Sirius magazine beginning in the March issue in January 2021. On 20 November 2022, during their panel at Anime NYC 2022, Kodansha USA announced that they have licensed the manga in English.

=== Game adaptations ===
An endless runner video game was developed by TabTale and released in April 2018 as a mobile app. In April 2019 Miraculous Ladybug & Cat Noir was announced as new mobile game and in May 2019, the game was presented by Jeremy Zag.

It was revealed by VentureBeat and Mars Rose that a Roblox game was being produced. Titled Miraculous RP: Quests of Ladybug and Cat Noir, created by Toya Games, it was released in beta on 4 May 2021, and fully released on 2 June the same year. This roleplay game is the first official Roblox game for a TV series franchise and has reached 200 million plays as of September 2021.

On 1 September 2022, a game based on the show was announced, titled Miraculous: Rise of the Sphinx, developed by Magic Pockets and published by GameMill Entertainment for the PlayStation 4, PlayStation 5, Xbox One, Microsoft Windows, and Nintendo Switch, and was released on 25 October 2022. The announcement stated that the game would feature both single-player and co-op game modes. A sequel, Miraculous: Paris Under Siege, was released on 25 October 2024.

The theme song was released to Just Dance 2023 Edition via the Just Dance+ subscription service on August 10, 2023.

In 2025, the Miraculous franchise partnered with the video gaming series Talking Tom & Friends.
