= Cortazzo =

Cortazzo is a surname. Notable people with the surname include:

- Ariel Cortazzo (1915–1998), Argentine screenwriter
- Jess Cortazzo (1904–1963), American baseball player
- Oreste Cortazzo (1836–1910/12), Italian born French painter, graphic artist, and illustrator
- Juan Cruz Cortazzo (2005–), Argentinean soccer player

== See also ==
- Corazzo
