= Albert Savarus =

Book by Honoré de Balzac

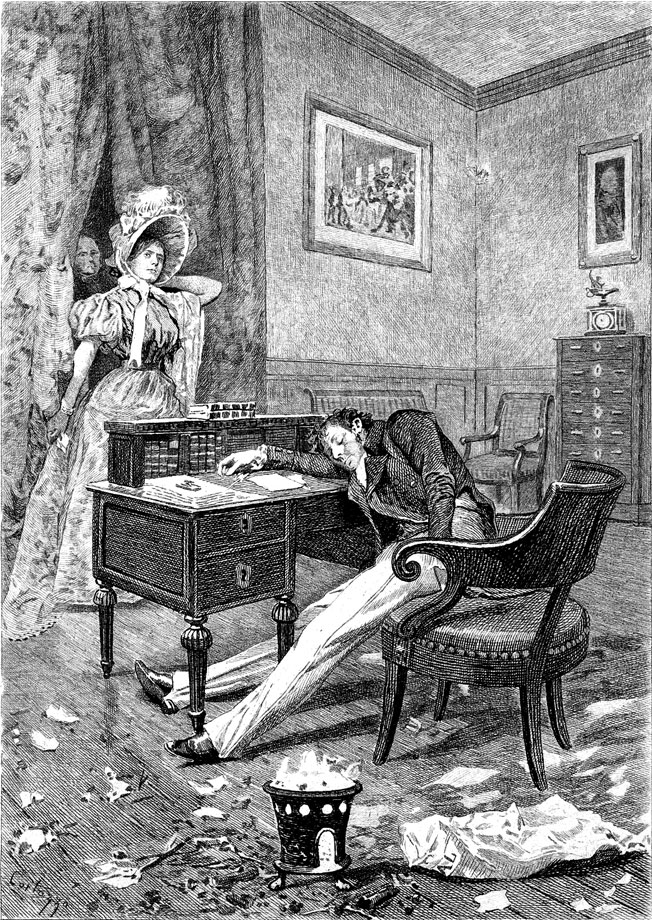
- Illustration from an 1897 edition by Oreste Cortazzo
- Author: Honoré de Balzac
- Translator: Ellen Marriage
- Language: French
- Series: La Comédie humaine
- Genre: Scènes de la vie privée
- Publisher: Furne
- Publication date: 1842
- Publication place: France
- Preceded by: Un début dans la vie
- Followed by: La Vendetta

Albert Savarus is an 1842 novel by French novelist and playwright Honoré de Balzac (1799–1850) and included in his series of novels (or Roman-fleuve) known as La Comédie humaine (The Human Comedy) which parodies and depicts French society in the period of the Restoration and the July Monarchy (1815–1848).

== Plot summary ==
Rosalie is the only daughter of the Wattevilles, a distinguished family of Besançon. Her father is timid and spends his time working on a lathe, while her mother is proud and domineering. Her mother is trying to encourage Rosalie to take an interest in M. de Soulas, who is a young fop. At a dinner party, the Abbé reports the spectacular success of a lawyer Savaron, who has settled quietly in the town. Rosalie takes an interest in the lawyer, who is good-looking, and gets her father to build a gazebo in the garden with the secret intent of being able to watch Savaron. Savaron is successful in several cases, and it becomes known that he has started a local literary journal. Rosalie persuades her father to subscribe, and reads a story obviously penned by Savaron.

In Savaron's story, two young men are touring in Switzerland. From a boat on a lake, Rudolfe, one of the young men, becomes captivated by a girl he sees leaning out of a window in a house on the lakeside. He instantly decides to stop in the village, and makes enquiries. He is told that the girl is a young English girl staying with her grandfather who has come there for his health with a dumb girl as a servant. Rudolfe tries to obtain invitations and eventually creeps into the garden and overhears the two girls talking Italian. It emerges that they are Italian émigrés who are hiding in Switzerland. Furthermore, it turns out that the girl, Francesca, is married to the old man. Rudolfe befriends them and enters into a chaste love affair with the girl. They are in love and agree to wait until the old man dies to get married. News comes that their exile has been lifted and the Italians depart to Geneva, where Rudolfe is to meet them later. When he gets there, it turns out that Francesca is a princess and her husband is a Duke. Rudolfe is invited to the house, and they swear undying love, before Rudolfe departs to make his name in the world.

When Rosalie has read the story, she suspects it is the true story of Savaron, and becomes jealous. She tricks her servant into obtaining Savaron's correspondence, and after a letter to Léopold, finds letters to the Princess and confirms that the story is true. Savaron tries to make his name in the town and stands for elections. There is much complex politicking to obtain him the vote. Wrapped up in it is a lawsuit over M. de Watteville's land. Rosalie persuades her father to enlist the help of Savaron, but he refuses to come into the open about it until after the election, because of possible effects on the electorate. Suddenly just before the election, Savaron disappears and is never heard of again. Rosalie's mother tries to push the marriage with M. de Soulas but Rosalie is totally opposed. Thus they fall out and after the death of her father, Rosalie is left in difficult circumstances. In response to Rosalie's taunt, her mother ends up marrying de Soulas herself.

Rosalie seeks the aid of the Abbé to find Savaron, and confesses to him the awful secret she has hidden. It turns out that not only did she intercept Savaron's mail and prevent it reaching him, but she also substituted letters to the Princess. In particular she wrote that Savaron was to marry herself and so Savoron's disappearance is linked to the marriage of Francesca to another man shortly after the death of her old husband. Savaron is tracked down to a monastery where he has shut himself off from the world. Rosalie is still vindictive and tries to find Francesca, delighting in telling her what happened and handing over the letters. Shortly afterwards Rosalie is horribly disfigured in a steamboat accident on the river Loire.

== Characters ==
- Hassib de Akoura
- M de Watteville
- Mme de Watteville
- Rosalie de Watteville
- l'Abbé de Grancey
- Amadée de Soulas
- Albert Savaron (Savarus)
- Léopold Hannequin
- Francesca Colonna

== Adaptations ==
The novel was the basis for the 1993 television film Albert Savarus, directed by Alexandre Astruc and starring Niels Arestrup, Dominique Sanda and Charlotte Valandrey.

== Translations ==
The novel has been translated into English by Ellen Marriage.
