= Natalia (film) =

1988 film

- Directed by: Bernard Cohn
- Starring: Philippine Leroy-Beaulieu
- Cinematography: Denys Clerval
- Release date: 1988
- Country: France
- Language: French

Natalia is a 1988 French drama film directed by Bernard Cohn. It was screened in the Un Certain Regard section at the 1988 Cannes Film Festival.

== Cast ==
- Pierre Arditi – Paul Langlade
- Philippine Leroy-Beaulieu – Natalia Gronska
- Gérard Blain – Claude Roitman
- Michel Voïta – Tomasz
- Dominique Blanc – Jacqueline Leroux
- Vernon Dobtcheff – Alfred Grabner
- Wladimir Yordanoff – Verdier
- Jacques Boudet – André Brachaire
- Gérard Boucaron – Jamain
- Elisabeth Kaza – La mère de Natalia (as Elizabeth Caza)
- Maria Machado – Inge Schwarzwald
- Fred Personne – André Valois
- Lionel Rocheman – Le père de Natalia
- Ludmila Mikaël – Catherine Valence
