= Red Kiss =

1985 film

- Film poster
- Directed by: Véra Belmont
- Written by: Véra Belmont; Guy Konopnicki; David Milhaud
- Produced by: Véra Belmont
- Starring: Charlotte Valandrey
- Cinematography: Ramón F. Suárez
- Edited by: Martine Giordano
- Music by: Jean-Marie Sénia
- Release date: 27 November 1985
- Running time: 112 minutes
- Country: France
- Language: French
- Box office: $5.6 million

Red Kiss (French: Rouge Baiser) is a 1985 French drama film directed by Véra Belmont. It was entered into the 36th Berlin International Film Festival, where Charlotte Valandrey won the Silver Bear for Best Actress.

== Cast ==
- Charlotte Valandrey as Nadia
- Lambert Wilson as Stéphane
- Marthe Keller as Bronka
- Laurent Terzieff as Moishe
- Laurent Arnal as Roland
- Elsa Lunghini as Rosa
- Isabelle Nanty as Jeanine
- Audrey Lazzini as Henriette
- Yves Nadot as André
- Jodi Pavlis as Marion
- Lionel Rocheman as M. Victor
- Georges Staquet as The Inspector
- Riton Liebman as Joël
