= Lionel Rocheman =

French actor (1928–2020)

- Born: 18 June 1928; Paris, France
- Died: 30 July 2020 (aged 92); Bagnolet, France
- Occupations: Musician; Actor; Writer

Lionel Rocheman (18 June 1928 – 30 July 2020) was a French musician, actor, and writer.

== Biography ==
Rocheman was born on 18 June 1928 in the 12th arrondissement of Paris to a Jewish family of Polish origin. At the age of 16, Rocheman became one of the youngest maquisards in the Bureau Central de Renseignements et d'Action.

Rocheman studied at the Lycée Voltaire in Paris, where he obtained a baccalaureate in philosophy in 1946. He also studied musicology and subsequently became a musician, specializing in old French songs, the first of which was originally performed by Georges Brassens.

He was the father of pianist Manuel Rocheman, and a member of the Sons and Daughters of Jewish Deportees from France. He was also a part of the Société des auteurs, compositeurs et éditeurs de musique, the Société des Auteurs et Compositeurs Dramatiques, and the Société des gens de lettres.

Lionel Rocheman died in Bagnolet on 30 July 2020, at the age of 92.

== Distinctions ==
- Grand Prix of the Académie Charles Cros (1970)
- Silver Medal of the City of Paris
- Gold Medal of the Société des auteurs, compositeurs et éditeurs de musique
- Knight of the Ordre des Arts et des Lettres (2003)

== Works ==
=== Stories ===
- Devenir Cécile (1977)
- Les Contes de grand-père Schlomo (1981)
- La Belle Âge (1984)
- Le Petit Monde de Schlomo (1989)
- La Tendresse du rire (2005)
- L'Âge d'être grand-père
- Fontenoy et autres nouvelles
- Rhapsodie ashkenaze

=== Essays ===
- Les Manuscrits nazaréens de la Mer Morte (1993)
- Sources sémitiques et mythe "indo-européen" (1996)
- Jésus, énigmes et polémiques (2000)

== Theatre ==
- Grand-Père Schlomo (1979)

== Filmography ==
=== Television ===
- Les Amies de Miami (1988)

=== Film ===
- I Don't Know Much, But I'll Say Everything (1973)
- Les Bidasses en vadrouille (1978)
- Le Grand Pardon (1981)
- Chanel Solitaire (1981)
- Le Retour des bidasses en folie (1982)
- Deux heures moins le quart avant Jésus-Christ (1982)
- Attention, une femme peut en cacher une autre ! (1983)
- Paroles et Musique (1984)
- Red Kiss (1985)
- Je hais les acteurs (1986)
- Fucking Fernand (1987)
- Natalia (1988)
- Virage (1995)
