= Clémence Lassalas =

French actress (born 1995)

Clémence Lassalas (born 11 July 1995) is a French actress known for Demain nous appartient.

== Filmography ==
=== Film ===
- 2005 : Écoute le temps
- 2006 : Je déteste les enfants des autres : Colombe
- 2014 : La Famille Bélier : Karène

=== Television ===
- 2019-2024 : Demain nous appartient : Charlie Molina
- 2006 : Je hais les vacances : Camille
- 2006 : Carla Rubens (episode Un enfant en otage) : Élodie
- 2005 : Je hais les parents : Camille
- 2004 : Le Grand Patron (episode Quarantaine) : Chloé Rocher
- 2003 : Je hais les enfants : Camille
- 2000 : L'Amour sur un fil

=== Serie ===
- 2021 : Emily in Paris (Season 2 - episode 9)

=== Music video ===
- 2006 : La Boulette (Diam's)

=== Advertisements ===
- Macif and Nestlé
