= Véra Belmont =

French film producer

- Born: 17 November 1932 (age 93); Paris, France
- Occupations: Film producer, film director, screenwriter
- Years active: 1959–present

Véra Belmont (born 17 November 1932) is a French film producer, director and screenwriter. Since 1960, she has produced 45 films, directed 5 films, and written 8 films. Her films were greatly inspired by François Truffaut and other members of the New Wave movement. Her 1985 film Red Kiss was entered into the 36th Berlin International Film Festival, where Charlotte Valandrey won the Silver Bear for Best Actress.

== Filmography ==
| Year | Title | Role | Notes |
|---|---|---|---|
| 1959 | Bal de nuit | Actress | Directed by Maurice Cloche |
| 1959 | La caméra explore le temps | Actress | TV series (1 episode) directed by Guy Lessertisseur |
| 1960 | Ça va être ta fête | Producer | Directed by Pierre Montazel |
| 1960 | Line of Sight | Actress | Directed by Jean-Daniel Pollet |
| 1960 | Les Cinq Dernières Minutes | Actress | TV series (1 episode) directed by Claude Loursais |
| 1966 | Les ruses du diable | Producer | Directed by Paul Vecchiali |
| 1967 | La loi du survivant | Producer | Directed by José Giovanni |
| 1967 | Le crime de David Levinstein | Producer | Directed by André Charpak |
| 1968 | Naked Childhood | Producer | Directed by Maurice Pialat |
| 1968 | The Young Wolves | Producer | Directed by Marcel Carné |
| 1969 | Money-Money | Producer | Directed by José Varela |
| 1970 | The Cop | Producer | Directed by Yves Boisset |
| 1970 | La faute de l'abbé Mouret | Producer | Directed by Georges Franju |
| 1970 | Quatre hommes aux poings nus | Executive producer | Directed by Robert Topart |
| 1972 | Les petits enfants d'Attila | Producer | Directed by Jean-Pierre Bastid |
| 1973 | Lo Païs | Producer | Directed by Gérard Guérin |
| 1973 | Le mariage à la mode | Producer | Directed by Michel Mardore |
| 1973 | Pourquoi Israël | Producer | Documentary directed by Claude Lanzmann |
| 1975 | Les oeillets rouges d'avril | Director | Documentary |
| 1975 | French Provincial | Producer | Directed by André Téchiné |
| 1975 | La route | Producer | Directed by Jean-François Bizot |
| 1975 | Dehors-dedans | Producer | Directed by Alain Fleischer |
| 1975 | À cause de l'homme à la voiture blanche | Producer | Directed by Jean Rougeul |
| 1975 | Weak Spot | Co-producer | Directed by Peter Fleischmann |
| 1976 | Le jardin des supplices | Producer | Directed by Christian Gion |
| 1977 | Les loulous | Producer | Directed by Patrick Cabouat |
| 1978 | La jument vapeur | Producer | Directed by Joyce Buñuel |
| 1979 | Prisonniers de Mao | Director, writer & Producer | |
| 1979 | The Police War | Producer | Directed by Robin Davis |
| 1980 | Tendres Cousines | Producer | Directed by David Hamilton |
| 1980 | Les Charlots contre Dracula | Producer | Directed by Jean-Pierre Desagnat |
| 1981 | Quest for Fire | Co-producer | Directed by Jean-Jacques Annaud; Nominated - Golden Globe Award for Best Foreign Language Film |
| 1982 | Légitime violence | Writer & producer | Directed by Serge Leroy |
| 1983 | Les mots pour le dire | Producer | Directed by José Pinheiro |
| 1984 | This Is My Country | Producer | Directed by Lino Brocka |
| 1985 | Red Kiss | Director, writer & Producer | Nominated - Berlin International Film Festival - Golden Berlin Bear |
| 1985 | Diesel | Producer | Directed by Robert Kramer |
| 1987 | Fucking Fernand | Writer & producer | Directed by Gérard Mordillat |
| 1987 | La Vie est Belle | Co-producer | Directed by Mwezé Ngangura & Benoît Lamy |
| 1989 | Cher frangin | Producer | Directed by Gérard Mordillat |
| 1990 | Eminent Domain | Co-producer | Directed by John Irvin |
| 1991 | Milena | Director, writer & Producer | |
| 1992 | Ben Rock | Producer | Directed by Richard Raynal |
| 1994 | Farinelli | Producer | Directed by Gérard Corbiau; Golden Globe Award for Best Foreign Language Film; Nominated - Academy Award for Best Foreign Language Film |
| 1997 | Marquise | Director, writer & Producer | Nominated - American Film Institute - Grand Jury Prize; Nominated - British Independent Film Award for Best Foreign Independent Film |
| 1997 | The Truce | Producer | Directed by Francesco Rosi; David di Donatello Award for Best Producer |
| 1999 | Paddy | Producer | Directed by Gérard Mordillat |
| 1999 | Occupé ? | Producer | Short directed by Xavier Castano |
| 2002 | Marie Marmaille | Producer | TV movie directed by Jean-Louis Bertucelli |
| 2005 | Chok-Dee | Writer & producer | Directed by Xavier Durringer |
| 2007 | Survivre avec les loups | Director, writer & Producer | |
| 2013 | Le grand retournement | Delegate producer | Directed by Gérard Mordillat |
| 2016 | Venise sous la neige | Writer & producer | Directed by Elliott Covrigaru |
| 2022 | My Father's Secrets | Director & writer | |
