= Lou (French singer) =

French singer

Lou Jean
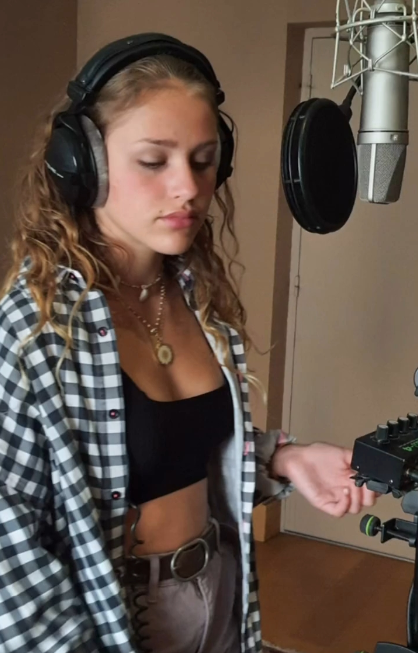
- Lou in 2021
- Born: 27 January 2004 (age 22); Castres, Tarn, France
- Occupations: singer; actress
- Years active: 2016–present
- Musical career
- Genre: Pop
- Instruments: vocals & piano
- Label: TF1 Musique

Lou Jean (born 27 January 2004), known on stage as simply Lou, is a French singer.

== Biography ==
Lou Jean was born on 27 January 2004 in Castres, Tarn. At the age of eight, she began taking singing and theatre classes. She shared her covers of songs on her YouTube channel.

After the final episode of the third French season of The Voice Kids, which was broadcast on TF1 in 2016, she began working on an album. Its first single, Toutes les chances du monde, was released in July 2017. She was also cast into the TF1 soap opera Demain nous appartient, which premiered around the same time, on 17 July 2017, and she sang its theme song.

=== The Voice Kids ===
Lou's YouTube covers attracted the attention of the TV producers of The Voice Kids on TF1, who offered her a spot on season 3 of the show. She finished the season in 2nd, behind Manuela Diaz.

=== After The Voice Kids ===
After The Voice Kids, Lou Jean produced her first album. It is headed by her first single, All the chances of the world, which backs the credits of the TF1 series Tomorrow Is Ours, in which she plays Betty Moreno.

In 2017, Lou participated in the Sardou et nous... project, with Kids United, Nemo Schiffman, Angie Robba, Dylan, Ilyana and Thibault. The same year, she also participated in the project Enfoirés Kids.

In 2018, she rereleased her album with 4 new titles: a cover of M'en aller in a duet with Evan and Marco, Une fille du soleil (Mi Eldorado) in a duet with Adryano, the English and French credits of Miraculous Ladybug with Lenni-Kim, and Maya Maya (Les jeux du miel), a song from the movie Maya the Bee, a film in which she lends her voice to the character Violette.

In 2019, Lou released her second album entitled Danser sur tes mots, available in normal and collector's edition. A third edition was released a few months later, featuring the bonus singles This wall that separates us with Lenni-Kim, Miraculous (credits to the Miraculous: Tales of Ladybug & Cat Noir) with Lenni-Kim, N'importe quoi, Les Loups, and Près du cœr .

In 2020, Lou participated in the project Green Team alongside Carla Lazzari, Erza Muqoli, the new generation of Kids United, and many others. The same year, she reached one million subscribers on her YouTube channel.

In 2021, Lou released the single Ne me suis pas, a song written and composed by herself. She interprets the role of Capucine in season 8 of the series Léo Matteï , broadcast on TF1. On 13 July she released the song Y'a pas Moyen, taken from the episode Les perchés (in which she plays the role of Lola) of the series Josephine, Guardian Angel. She released a single on 23 July named So So. On 24 September she released her new album Papillons, which features originally composed music. She then released a clip of the title taken from her album Butterflies: Vital on 12 October.

In 2023, Lou provided singing voice for Marinette in the English and French dub of Ladybug & Cat Noir: The Movie. The film's soundtrack was released on 30 June 2023 by Muzeek One under the TF1 Musique label. "Plus forts ensemble" (English: "Stronger Together") by Lou and Elliott was released as the album's lead single on 9 June 2023. The music video was released on 21 June 2023. A second single, "Courage en moi" (English: "Courage in Me") by Lou, was released on 21 July, followed by a music video on 23 July. A separate film score album was released on 5 July 2023 by Muzeek One. A showcase with Ladybug and Cat Noir's singing voices, Lou and Elliott, was organized at the Salon Gustave Eiffel on the first floor of the Eiffel Tower on 28 June 2023 to promote the soundtrack. Another showcase was organized at the 2023 Japan Expo on 14 July.

== Discography ==
=== Albums ===
Title	Details	Charts			
Title	Details	FRA	BEL (Wa)	SWI	SWI (Rom)
Lou	Released: 6 October 2017; Label: TF1 / Sony	19	11	—	—
Danser sur tes mots	Released: 29 March 2019; Label: TF1 / Sony	16	13	97	16
Papillons	Released: 24 September 2021; Label: TF1 / Sony	29	81	—	—

=== Singles ===
Title	Year	Charts	Album
Title	Year	FRA	Album
"Toutes les chances du monde"	2017	?	Lou
"Demain (generic of the series Tomorrow Is Ours)"	2017	?	Lou
"À mon âge"	2017	?	Lou
"Miraculous (with Lenni-Kim, generic of series Miraculous: Tales of Ladybug & Cat Noir)"	2017	?	Lou
"Une fille du soleil (with Adryano)"	2018	?	Lou
"Qui pourrait?"	2019	?	Danser sur tes mots
"Besoin d'air"	2019	?	Danser sur tes mots
"Dans le bleu du ciel"	2019	?	Danser sur tes mots
"Ce mur qui nous sépare" "The wall between us"(with Lenni-Kim, generic of series Miraculous: Tales of Ladybug & Cat Noir)	2019	?	Danser sur tes mots
" Donne-moi"	2020	?	Danser sur tes mots
"Ne me suis pas"	2021	?	Papillons
"Y'a pas moyen" (taken from the episode Les perchés from the Josephine, Guardian Angel series)	2021	?	Papillons

== Filmography ==
=== Film ===
Key
†	Denotes productions that have not yet been released

Year	Title	Role	Notes
2018	Maya the Bee: The Honey Games	Violet (Voice)	French dubbing
2023	Mummies	Nefer (Voice)	French dubbing
2023	Ladybug & Cat Noir: The Movie	Marinette Dupain-Cheng / Ladybug (Singing voice)	French and English dubbing

=== Television ===
Year	Title	Role	Notes
2017–2021	Tomorrow Is Ours	Betty Moreno	Main role; seasons 1–4
2021	Leo Mattei, Special Unit	Capucine	Episodes: "Les blessures de l'enfance" (parts 1 and 2)
2021	Josephine, Guardian Angel	Lola	Episode: "Les perchés"
