= Albert Savarus (film) =

1993 film directed by Alexandre Astruc

- Based on: Albert Savarus by Honoré de Balzac
- Screenplay by: Alexandre Astruc
- Directed by: Alexandre Astruc
- Country of origin: France
- Original language: French

Production
- Cinematography: Jean-Jacques Rochut
- Running time: 61 minutes
- Production company: France 3; La Sept

Original release
- Release: 30 January 1993

Albert Savarus is a 1993 French television drama film directed by Alexandre Astruc. It is based on the novel Albert Savarus by Honoré de Balzac.

The film was commissioned by France 3 and La Sept as part of the project Les jeunes filles romantiques (transl. The Romantic Girls), which consisted of television adaptations of 19th-century literature about women. Filming took place during three weeks in March and April 1992 in and around Dole.

== Cast ==
- Niels Arestrup as Albert Savarus
- Dominique Sanda as Duchess Francesca d'Argaiolo
- Charlotte Valandrey as Rosalie de Watteville
