= Ladybug & Cat Noir: The Movie =

- Theatrical release poster
- French: Miraculous, le film
- Directed by: Jeremy Zag
- Screenplay by: Jeremy Zag; Bettina Lopez Mendoza
- Story by: Jeremy Zag
- Based on: Miraculous: Tales of Ladybug & Cat Noir by Thomas Astruc and Nathanaël Bronn
- Produced by: Aton Soumache; Jeremy Zag; Daisy Shang
- Starring: Anouck Hautbois; Benjamin Bollen; Antoine Tomé; Marie Nonnenmacher; Thierry Kazazian; Fanny Bloc
- Edited by: Yvann Thibaudeau
- Music by: Jeremy Zag
- Layouts by: Karim El Mokaddem
- Production companies: Method Animation; The Awakening Production; SND; Cross Creek Pictures; Fantawild; Zagtoon
- Distributed by: SND
- Release dates: 11 June 2023 (Grand Rex); 5 July 2023 (France)
- Running time: 102 minutes
- Country: France
- Language: French
- Budget: €80 million ($86 million)
- Box office: $40.5 million

Ladybug & Cat Noir: The Movie (French: Miraculous, le film), also titled Miraculous: Ladybug & Cat Noir, The Movie in some territories, is a 2023 French animated musical romantic superhero film directed, co-written, and scored by Jeremy Zag. It is an adaptation of the animated television series Miraculous: Tales of Ladybug & Cat Noir, and follows two Parisian teenagers, Marinette Dupain-Cheng and Adrien Agreste, who transform into the superheroes Ladybug and Cat Noir, respectively, to protect Paris from supervillains led by Hawk Moth. Most of the cast members, both English and French, from the television series reprise their roles, with others joining the cast.

The film was announced in 2018, but production began in 2019, with confirmation that the plot would explore the origins of the franchise. Jeremy Zag was confirmed as director and co-wrote the screenplay with Bettina Lopez Mendoza. Zag also served as a producer through ZAG, Inc., alongside Mediawan, under the Awakening Production banner; SND also served as distributor. (Note: Fantawild Animation and Cross Creek Pictures are credited as associated companies following their financial participation.) The film was animated by Mediawan's ON Animation Studios in Montreal, Canada. On a budget of €80 million, it is currently the second most expensive French film ever made.

Ladybug & Cat Noir: The Movie premiered at the Grand Rex on 11 June 2023, and was released in France on 5 July 2023, by SND. Internationally, it was released theatrically from the same date onwards in select regions, and was released on 28 July 2023 on Netflix in others. It received mixed reviews from critics, who praised the animation, soundtrack, and action sequences, but criticized the simplistic screenplay, humor and story. It grossed $40.1 million worldwide. While performing well in some European countries due to the popularity of the franchise, it was considered a box-office disappointment in France. However, the film has since gained a cult following. A sequel is in development.

== Plot ==
Marinette Dupain-Cheng, a clumsy, socially awkward teenager living in Paris, goes to school trying to avoid being noticed. Despite sparking a friendship with another student, Alya Césaire, Marinette finds herself desperately attempting to avoid the wrath of a rich, bratty girl, Chloé Bourgeois. While attempting to escape, Marinette runs into a boy named Adrien Agreste and starts crushing on him. Adrien has become incredibly emotionally distant from others because of his mother, Émilie Agreste's, recent passing. Similarly wracked by her death, Adrien's fashion designer father, Gabriel Agreste, uses the Butterfly Miraculous, a magical jewel, to become Hawk Moth and creates chaos in hopes of luring out the holders of the Ladybug and Black Cat Miraculous. Since those two Miraculous combined possess a "power stronger than death", Gabriel hopes to use them to bring his wife back.

Hawk Moth's appearance is sensed by Wang Fu, the guardian of the Miracle Box, who chooses to release the Ladybug and Black Cat Miraculous, only for them to fly away. Fu chases after the Ladybug Miraculous and runs into the street in the process, nearly being hit by an oncoming bus, but is saved by Marinette, who is still running away from Chloé. Fu realizes that Marinette deserves the Miraculous, watching as it flies into her bag. Marinette ducks into an empty shop in an alley and meets Tikki, the Kwami of Creation, while her polar opposite, Plagg, the Kwami of Destruction, makes his way to Adrien.

Tikki explains the situation to Marinette, who is initially reluctant to become a superhero due to her lack of self-confidence and innate clumsiness. Tikki eventually forcibly transforms her into the hero Ladybug, and she quickly runs into Adrien, who has now used his Miraculous to become Cat Noir. Both clumsily work together to fight the Gargoyle, an "akumatized" villain created by Hawk Moth from the negative emotions of a heartbroken Paris civilian whose marriage proposal was rejected by his girlfriend. The battle ends when the Gargoyle is hit by a train, with Cat Noir also nearly being hit. Ladybug saves him, resulting in him developing a crush on her. Following the fight, Fu approaches the pair and stresses the importance of them working together.

Marinette initially refuses to continue being Ladybug, but Hawk Moth recruits more villains to cause havoc. Gathering the courage to fight, Marinette transforms once again and defeats them alongside Cat Noir.

After defeating all of the akumatized villains Hawk Moth has sent their way, the two superheroes build the confidence to ask out their respective crush; Marinette confesses her feelings to Adrien, whilst Cat Noir confesses his love to Ladybug. Being unaware of their true identities, neither confession goes well, damaging their teamwork. While hurt by his rejection, Adrien lashes out at his father for being neglectful.

Desperate, Gabriel becomes Hawk Moth once more and akumatizes himself and begins wreaking havoc on Paris, prompting Ladybug and Cat Noir to go into action, though not as a united team. The heroes are overwhelmed, and Ladybug has her earrings taken, but Marinette manages to briefly power through to save Cat Noir from Hawk Moth. When Cat Noir's mask is damaged, a horrified Hawk Moth discovers that Adrien is Cat Noir and renounces his Miraculous powers. Gabriel explains himself to Adrien and tearfully repents, realizing that the "power stronger than death" was referring to love. Seeing him remorseful for his actions, Adrien forgives his father and reconciles with him, while Marinette reclaims her earrings and returns the Butterfly Miraculous to Fu. Ladybug is then able to utilize the full extent of her power of creation using love and repairs all the damage done to Paris. Gabriel is exposed publicly as Hawk Moth and arrested while Marinette returns to her family.

Weeks pass and the day of the Winter Ball arrives. Marinette arrives in a beautiful dress much to the crowd's pleasure. She finds Adrien, revealing that she knows his identity, having seen his reconciliation during the fight, and reveals her identity as well. They then share a first kiss.

At the Agreste Mansion, Nathalie Sancoeur, the Agrestes' assistant, enters a hidden room in Gabriel's office. Inside is the body of Émilie, who is wearing the Peacock Miraculous. A voice-over from Gabriel instructs her to keep it a secret.

== Voice cast ==
=== Original French cast ===
- Anouck Hautbois as Marinette Dupain-Cheng / Ladybug
  - Lou provides Marinette's singing voice, replacing Hautbois, who does her own singing in the series.
- Benjamin Bollen as Adrien Agreste / Cat Noir
  - Elliott provides Adrien's singing voice, replacing Bollen, who does his own singing in the series.
- Antoine Tomé as Gabriel Agreste / Papillon
- Marie Nonnenmacher as Tikki, Sabrina Raincomprix, Juleka Couffaine, and Alix Kubdel
  - Cerise Calixte provides Tikki's singing voice
- Thierry Kazazian as Plagg and the Monster
- Fanny Bloc as Alya Césaire
- Alexandre Nguyen as Nino Lahiffe and Lê Chiến Kim
- Marie Chevalot as Chloé Bourgeois and Nathalie Sancoeur
- Martial Le Minoux as Tom Dupain, Max Kanté, and Nooroo
- Gilbert Lévy as Master Wang Fu and Denis Damoclès
- Jessie Lambotte as Sabine Cheng
- Flora Kaprielian as the Magician
- Franck Tordjman as Nathaniel Kurtzberg and Ivan Bruel
- Jeanne Chartier as Émilie Agreste

=== English cast ===
- Cristina Vee as Marinette Dupain-Cheng / Ladybug
  - Lou also provides Marinette's singing voice in the English dub, replacing Vee, who does her singing in the series.
- Bryce Papenbrook as Adrien Agreste / Cat Noir
  - Drew Ryan Scott provides Adrien's singing voice, replacing Papenbrook, who does his own singing in the series.
- Keith Silverstein as Gabriel Agreste / Hawk Moth
- Mela Lee as Tikki
- Max Mittelman as Plagg and Ivan Bruel
- Sabrina Weisz as Nathalie Sancoeur and Nadja Chamack
- Carrie Keranen as Alya Césaire
- Zeno Robinson as Nino Lahiffe and Max Kanté
- Selah Victor as Chloé Bourgeois
- Cassandra Lee Morris as Sabrina Raincomprix. Lee Morris reprises her role from Seasons 2-3 of the series, and replaces Lauren Landa from the series, who has voice Sabrina since Season 4.
- Christopher Corey Smith as Tom Dupain and Raymond / the Gargoyle
- Anne Yatco as Sabine Cheng
- Paul St. Peter as Wang Fu
- Kira Buckland as Alix Kubdel
- Jessica Gee as Mylène Haprèle
- Grant George as Lê Chiến Kim
- Shelby Young as the Magician
- Colleen O'Shaughnessey as Emilie Agreste
- Ezra Weisz as Vincent and Simon Grimault. Weisz replaces Matt Mercer, who voices Vincent in the series.
- Reba Buhr as Juleka Couffaine and Rose Lavillant (uncredited)
- Andrew Russell as Luka Couffaine (uncredited)
- Michael Sinterniklaas as Nathaniel Kurtzberg (uncredited)
- Lauren Amante as Nooroo. Amante replaces Benjamin Diskin, who voices Nooroo in the series.

== Production ==
=== Development ===
The film was first announced by Jeremy Zag during the Miraculous panel at the ComiKon İstanbul on 29 September 2018. The film was originally set to be released in 2021. On 5 December 2018, Zag confirmed that its plot will be a mix between an origin story and the television series storyline. Finishing the fourth and fifth seasons of the series before the movie was a priority for the studio. The following day, during a panel at Comic Con Experience 2018, Zag said that the film will be a musical with feature music composed by himself.

On 16 May 2019, during Cannes Film Festival, it was announced that the movie would be titled Ladybug & Cat Noir Awakening and that production was underway. On 5 October 2019, a short animated tease featuring Ladybug was put up on Zag's Instagram. On 12 February 2020, it was announced that Fantawild was one of the studios helping create and animate the film. In March 2022, the editing of the movie was completed.

In April 2022, it was announced that the movie was made with a budget of €80 million, making it the second most expensive French film ever made behind the 2017 film Valerian and the City of a Thousand Planets.

=== Animation ===
Animation is provided by Mediawan's subsidiary ON Animation Studios in Montreal, Canada. Additional animation, lighting, and compositing were provided by Dwarf Animation Studio in France.

=== Choreography and visualization ===
The film's choreography and visualization team consisted of Shannon Holtzapffel and Cameron Sonerson. According to Animation Magazine, they developed live-action video reference for the musical and action sequences before translating the material into CG blocking for the animation team. Ladybug's movement language drew on ballet and jazz, with posing, posture and line informing the character's performance.

== Music ==
During the 2018 Comic Con Experience, Jeremy Zag announced that the film was a musical and featured music composed by himself. Australian filmmaker Michael Gracey joined the film as executive producer to help develop the musical aspect. British songwriter Chris Read also joined the team to co-write the lyrics.

The film's soundtrack was released on 30 June 2023 by Muzeek One under the TF1 Musique label. "Plus forts ensemble" (English: "Stronger Together") by Lou and Elliott was released as the album's lead single on 9 June 2023. The music video was released on 21 June 2023. A second single, "Courage en moi" (English: "Courage in Me") by Lou, was released on 21 July, followed by a music video on 23 July. A separate film score album was released on 5 July 2023 by Muzeek One.

A showcase with Ladybug and Cat Noir's singing voices, Lou and Elliott, was organized at the Salon Gustave Eiffel on the first floor of the Eiffel Tower on 28 June 2023 to promote the soundtrack. Another showcase was organized at the 2023 Japan Expo on 14 July.

Foreign language versions of the album were released on 5 July 2023, alongside the score album. In the English version, Lou reprises Marinette's singing voice, with Drew Ryan Scott providing the singing voice for Cat Noir, Mela Lee for Tikki, and Keith Silverstein for Gabriel Agreste. The English version of "Si je croyais en moi", titled "If I Believed in Me", was released as a promotional single on 28 July 2023, to promote the film release on Netflix in English-speaking territories. The English version of the soundtrack was distributed by Lakeshore Records.

Additionally, "Careless Whisper" by Wham! is featured in the film and plays twice.

== Marketing ==
The marketing campaign for Ladybug & Cat Noir: The Movie began on 5 December 2022, when a teaser trailer and a teaser poster were revealed by SND. The official trailer and the theatrical release poster were released on 4 April 2023 in France, with the trailer also being released in international territories where the film was set to be released theatrically. For the territories where the film was distributed by Netflix, the trailer was released on 17 May 2023 on the service's social media platforms.

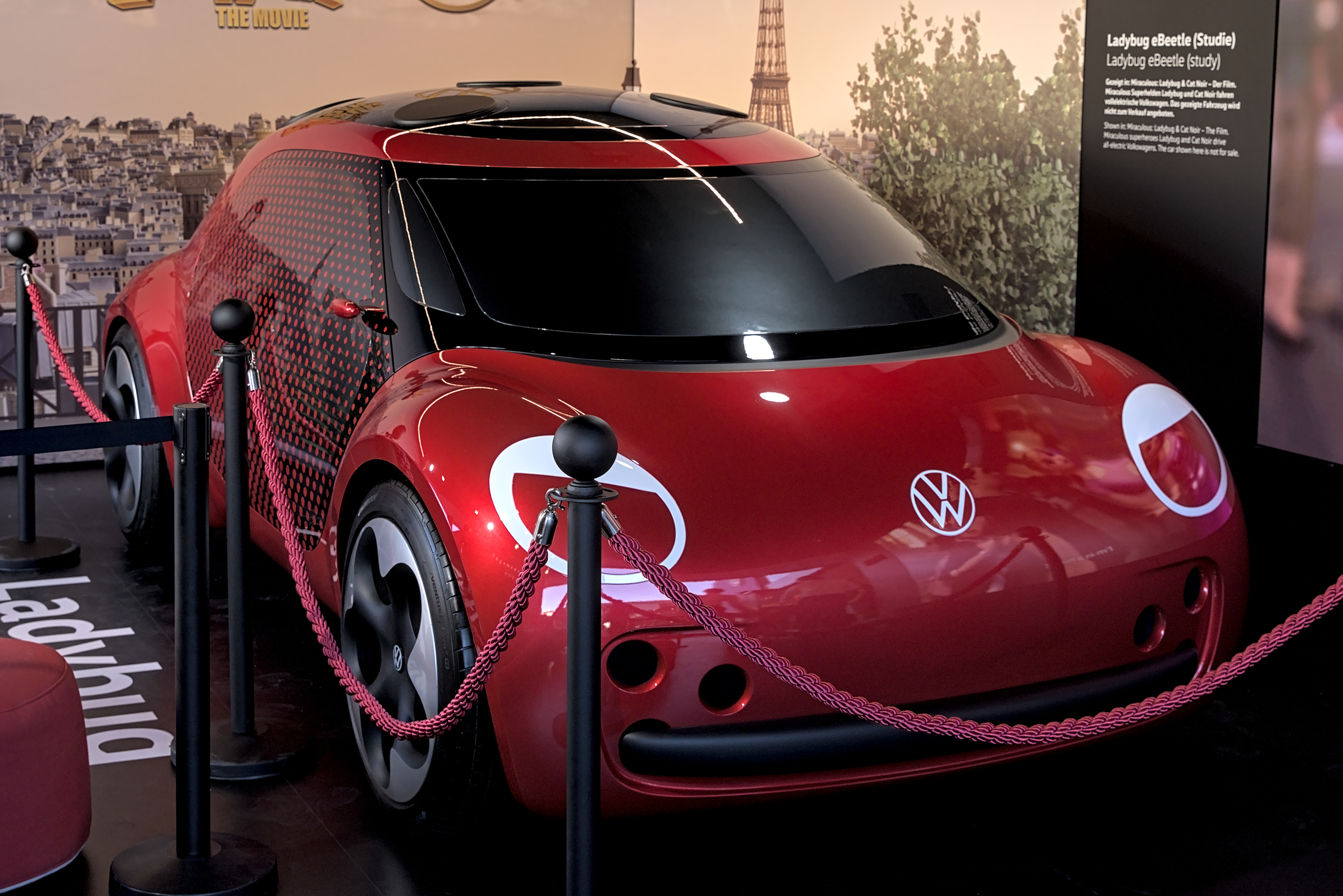
The Volkswagen Beetle displayed in one scene of the film.

On 12 June 2023, it was revealed that the film will feature cars from Volkswagen's ID. series following a deal between the German vehicle manufacturer and ZAG Inc. An animated Volkswagen spot featuring characters from the film was displayed in movie theaters to coincide with the release. Products from The Swatch Group's children's brand Flik Flak are also featured in the film, with the brand also releasing a watch collection inspired by the film.

On 28 June 2023, a musical showcase was organized at the Salon Gustave Eiffel on the 1st floor of the Eiffel Tower to promote the film and its soundtrack, with Ladybug and Cat Noir's singing voices, Lou and Elliott, performing. Another showcase was organized at the 2023 Japan Expo on 14 July 2023. To coincide with the release, Playmates Toys released a doll collection inspired by the film.

On 4 July 2023, Anouck Hautbois reprised her role as the voice of Ladybug during an interview by Xavier de Moulins for the French television news program Le 19.45 on M6. Ladybug appeared thanks to an animated sequence created by the film's team.

== Release ==
=== Theatrical ===
Ladybug & Cat Noir: The Movie had its world premiere at the Grand Rex in Paris on 11 June 2023.

The film was previously set for a late 2021 release in France, according to Le Figaro. During the 2021 Annecy Festival, it was moved to the first half of 2022. The film was originally set to be released theatrically in France on 3 August 2022 by SND, but was later delayed to 5 July 2023.

Internationally, the film was released theatrically simultaneously in the Netherlands, and in French-speaking regions of Belgium, Switzerland, and Luxembourg. It was released in other territories from 6 July 2023, beginning with Germany and the German- and Dutch-speaking regions of Belgium, Switzerland and Luxembourg.

A limited American release at three Stone Theatres locations began on 11 August 2023 and concluded on 17 August.

=== Home media ===
In international territories where the film was not released theatrically, it was released on Netflix on 28 July 2023.

Ladybug & Cat Noir: The Movie was released in France digitally, and on Blu-ray and DVD on 2 November 2023 by M6 Vidéo, with distribution handled by Warner Bros. Home Entertainment France.

== Reception ==
=== Box office ===
Ladybug & Cat Noir: The Movie has grossed $12.4 million in France, and $27.6 million in other territories, for a worldwide total of $40.1 million.

On the date of the world premiere at the Grand Rex on 11 June 2023, the film was also shown simultaneously in select movie theaters in France, selling 68,582 tickets. (Note: In France, the box office is measured by the number of tickets sold by the film.)

In France, Ladybug & Cat Noir: The Movie was released alongside On the Fringe, Insidious: The Red Door, Yo Mama, Master Gardener, and the re-release of Asterix & Obelix: Mission Cleopatra. On its first day, the film debuted with 318,144 tickets sold (including 85,721 tickets from previews), surpassing the French opening day of The Super Mario Bros. Movie (281,442 tickets sold on 5 April 2023). It also became the biggest opening day for a French animated film.

The film went on to debut with 660,421 tickets sold for its opening week, finishing first at the box office, surpassing Indiana Jones and the Dial of Destiny (643,714 tickets sold in its second week). It became the second best opening week of the year for an animated film in France, behind The Super Mario Bros. Movie (1,866,914 tickets sold in its opening week), and the sixth best opening week for a French animated film, behind Arthur 3: The War of the Two Worlds (751,000 tickets sold in 2010).

The film sold 294,174 tickets in its second week, finishing fourth at the box office behind Elemental (342,490 tickets sold in its fourth week). The 55.5% drop was attributed to possible mixed word of mouth.

In France, Ladybug & Cat Noir: The Movie was:

- The seventh highest-grossing French film of 2023, behind Asterix & Obelix: The Middle Kingdom, Alibi.com 2, The Three Musketeers: D'Artagnan, The Three Musketeers: Milady, Only 3 Days Left, and Open Season.
- The sixth highest-grossing animated film of 2023, behind The Super Mario Bros. Movie, Elemental, Wish, PAW Patrol: The Mighty Movie, and Spider-Man: Across the Spider-Verse.
- The twenty-fourth highest-grossing film of 2023 in the country.

French analysts labeled the film a domestic box-office disappointment. Internationally, Ladybug & Cat Noir: The Movie did particularly well in Germany and Russia, which became the film's second and third-largest markets, respectively. However, it is not known whether the film was a financial bomb or not, as the amount paid by Netflix to acquire the distribution rights in territories where the film was not released theatrically is unknown.

=== Critical response ===
On the review aggregator website Rotten Tomatoes, the film holds an approval rating of 54% based on 14 reviews.

Following its release in France, AlloCiné reported that the critical reception for the movie was mixed.

Le Parisien's movie team gave the film a positive review and wrote, "Paris is still the heart of Miraculous. The whole is embellished with songs, like in a Disney. The story, simple but effective, is about fear, courage and love." O.D from Le Figaro wrote in his review, "this French style animated musical blockbuster, benefits from its clean drawing, and pretty action sequences." Isabelle Boudet of Les Fiches du cinéma stated, "the animation and the Paris from a postcard are still just as attractive, but the story loses a bit of its soul by flirting with Disney."

Philippe Guedj from Le Point stated, "[It] is a classic blockbuster but he succeeded in his mission and will delight the fans, while making the parents smile." Thibault Liessi of Le Dauphiné libéré wrote, "[It] remains entertaining despite everything thanks to the twirling action scenes, and that's not bad." Cédric Coppola from Sud Ouest stated, "without revolutionizing the formula, Miraculous is worth watching because of its energy and its ability to introduce musical sequences between two fights." Fabrice Leclerc from Paris Match wrote in his review, "[It] blends into a traditional narration without any real originality, but it is visually impressive, evokes the teenage years with tenderness, plays the musical comedy card and gives a few tasty nods to French culture."

Thibault Liessi from Les Dernières Nouvelles d'Alsace gave it 3 stars out of 5 and wrote in his review, "this gives a film with a very curious rhythm, which forces its story a little, but which leaves time for the characters to pour out their feelings in (too) many songs." Xavier Leherpeur from L'Obs gave the film 2 stars out of 4 and noted that he, "wonders why the writers wanted to return to the genesis of the two heroes in fetishist outfits during the very long first part [of the film], when the probability of the presence of newcomers in the theater is close to zero."

== Future ==
On 3 July 2023, during an interview, Jeremy Zag revealed that a script for a possible sequel was completed and that they had started working on a script for a potential third movie. However, the project had not yet been greenlit by a production company or SND. Throughout 2024, Zag released several concept art images of the proposed sequel film, including a new Miraculous holder.

On 13 October 2025, it was revealed that producer John Cohen and writer Matt Roller would be working on the sequel alongside Jeremy Zag, who will also serve as a producer on the film.
