= Charlotte Valandrey =

French actress and author (1968–2022)

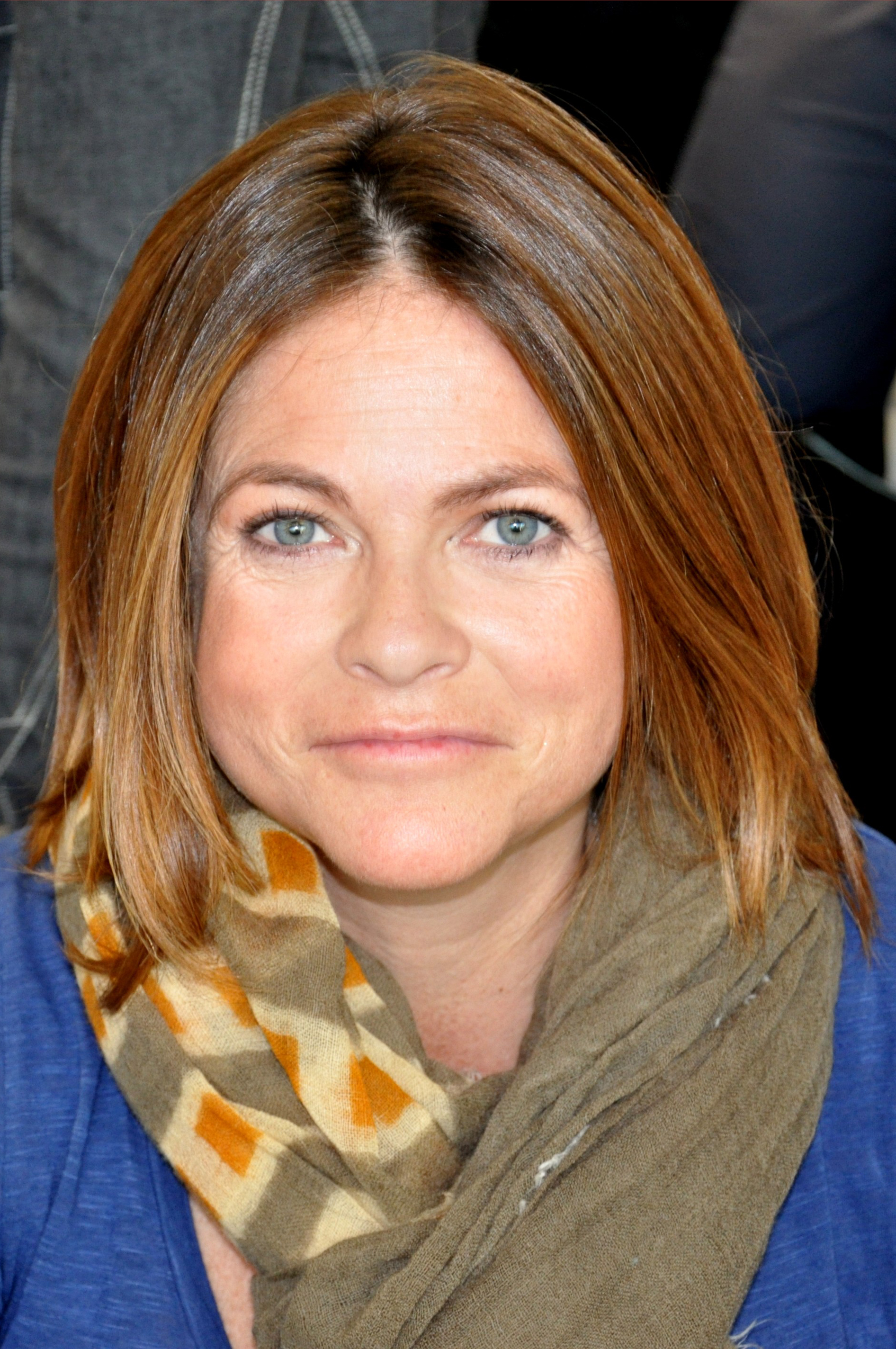
- Valandrey in 2012
- Born: Anne-Charlotte Pascal; 29 November 1968; Paris, France
- Died: 13 July 2022 (aged 53); Paris, France
- Years active: 1985–2022
- Spouse: Arthur Le Caisne (1999–2002)
- Children: 1
- Awards: Silver Bear for Best Actress (1986)

Charlotte Valandrey (29 November 1968 – 13 July 2022) was a French actress and author. After early success she was widely tipped for stardom, but her career took a more modest course until the release of her autobiography in 2005.

== Early life ==
Born Anne-Charlotte Pascal into an affluent family, Valandrey grew up in Brittany in north-western France. From the age of six she lived in the small coastal town of Pléneuf-Val-André, from which she took her professional name in 1985.

== Career ==
Valandrey's debut film was Véra Belmont's 1985 political drama Red Kiss, in which she played Nadia. Her highly acclaimed performance as a young communist in 1950s Paris was rewarded with a César award nomination for "Most Promising Actress" the following year but she eventually lost to Charlotte Gainsbourg. She also won the Silver Bear for Best Actress at the 36th Berlin International Film Festival. In 1986, she appeared in the music video for David Bowie's song "As the World Falls Down" from the soundtrack for the movie Labyrinth (1986), although the video went unreleased until 1993.

== Personal life ==
After making her debut, at the age of sixteen, in the film Red Kiss, she lived alone in a studio that her parents bought for her. Carefree and uninformed about the dangers involved, she had affairs with “a drug-addicted musician, and other boys at risk”. In 1986, a few days before her eighteenth birthday, she learned that she was HIV-positive.

In 1999, she met Arthur Lecaisne whom she married on 17 July 1999 in Pléneuf-Val-André. At the beginning of 2000, they had a daughter, Tara who is HIV-negative.

While separating from Arthur in 2002 and following a triple therapy which damaged her heart and caused her two heart attacks, her heart broke down, necrotic, and left her with only 10% heart capacity. On 4 November 2003, she received a transplant. In her book L'Amour dans le sang (published in 2005), she recounts her other love stories, with her cardiologist or Yann, an architect whom she intimately believes to be the husband of her late donor.

In March 2007, after selling over 280,000 copies of her book, Charlotte gave approval for its adaptation in the TV movie, L'Amour dans le sang. Produced by Dominique Besnehard for Mon Voisin Productions, it was first broadcast on 23 November 2008 on France 3.

On 8 June 2022, she announced that she was waiting for a second heart transplant because of new health problems. She received it on 14 June at the Pitié-Salpêtrière hospital but the transplant did not take.

Charlotte Valandrey died on 13 July 2022, at the age of 53. Her funeral took place in Pléneuf-Val-André. In the press release announcing the death, the family indicates that a tribute would be paid to her in Paris in September.

Charlotte was a patron of the Greffe de vie ("Foundation of Life Registry") and was committed to the cause of organ donation and transplantation.

== Filmography ==
Year	Title	Role	Director	Notes
1985	Red Kiss	Nadia	Véra Belmont	Silver Bear for Best Actress; Nominated – César Award for Most Promising Actress
1986	Taxi Boy	Corinne	Alain Page	
1987	Fucking Fernand	Lily	Gérard Mordillat	
1987	In the Shadow of the Wind	Olivia Atkins	Yves Simoneau	
1987	Bonjour maître	Laurence	Denys de La Patellière	TV Mini-Series
1988	Una casa a Roma	Vanessa	Bruno Cortini	TV movie
1988	Sueurs froides	Zoé	Michel Leroy	TV series (1 episode)
1990	Il giudice istruttore	Clara Martini	Gianluigi Calderone	TV series (1 episode)
1991	Toujours seuls	Charlotte	Gérard Mordillat	
1992	Orlando	Princess Sasha	Sally Potter	
1992	Le gang des tractions	Ginette	Josée Dayan	TV Mini-Series
1992	Police Secrets	Inspector Claire Rauch	Josée Dayan	TV series (1 episode)
1993	My Life and Times with Antonin Artaud	Colette Thomas	Gérard Mordillat	
1993	L'éternel mari	Katia Pogoretz	Denys Granier-Deferre	TV movie
1993	Albert Savarus	Rosalie de Watteville	Alexandre Astruc	TV movie
1993	Nestor Burma	Maria Kreiska	Henri Helman	TV series (1 episode)
1994–2003	Les Cordier, juge et flic	Myriam Cordier	Paul Planchon, Gilles Béhat, ...	TV series (42 episodes)
1995	L'ombra abitata	Rose	Massimo Mazzucco	TV movie
1995	The House That Mary Bought	Claire Benoit	Simon MacCorkindale	TV movie
1995	Babyfon – Mörder im Kinderzimmer		Kaspar Heidelbach	TV movie
1996	La rançon du chien	Sophie	Peter Kassovitz	TV movie
1996	Docteur Sylvestre	Marianne	Dominique Tabuteau	TV series (1 episode)
1997	Meurtre à l'étage	Anne	Bruno Gantillon	TV movie
2001	Tout va bien c'est Noël !	Christine	Laurent Dussaux	TV movie
2002	Napoléon	Aimée de Coigny	Yves Simoneau	TV Mini-Series
2004	Penn sardines	Soizic Le Bihan	Marc Rivière	TV movie
2004	Père et maire	Claire Conti	Gilles Béhat	TV series (1 episode)
2006	Jeanne Poisson, Marquise de Pompadour	Madame de Brancas	Robin Davis	TV movie
2006	Commissaire Cordier	Myriam Cordier	Eric Summer	TV series (1 episode)
2008	L'amour dans le sang	Charlotte	Vincent Monnet	TV movie
2009	All About Actresses	Yvan's casting director	Maïwenn	
2017–2019	Tomorrow is Ours	Laurence Moiret	Jérôme Navarro, Thierry Peythieu, ...	TV series (520 episodes)
2018	Les Innocents	Anne Desgrange	Frédéric Berthe & François Ryckelynck	TV Mini-Series

== Theater ==
Year	Title	Author	Director
1993	Roméo et Jeannette	Jean Anouilh	Daniel Ivernel
1998	Dirty Hands	Jean-Paul Sartre	Jean-Pierre Dravel
2007	The Memory of Water	Shelagh Stephenson	Bernard Murat
2009	Le siècle sera féminin ou ne sera pas	Dominique Coubes & Nathalie Vierne	Dominique Coubes
2016	Mon pote est une femme comme les autres	Anthony Michineau	Luq Hamett
2019	Station Bonne Nouvelle	Benjamin Auray	Didier Brengarth

== Author ==
Year	Book	Publishing
2005	L'Amour dans le sang	Cherche midi
2011	De cœur inconnu	Cherche midi
2012	N'oublie pas de m'aimer	Cherche midi
2014	Vers le 8e ciel	XO éditions
2016	Bombay mon amour	Cherche midi
2018	Chaque jour, j'écoute battre mon cœur	Cherche midi

== Dubbing ==
Year	Title	Role	Actress	Director
2004	Keane	Lynn Bedik	Amy Ryan	Lodge Kerrigan
2005	Hostage	Jane Talley	Serena Scott Thomas	Florent Emilio Siri
2005	The Jacket	Dr. Beth Lorenson	Jennifer Jason Leigh	John Maybury
2005	Rumor Has It	Sarah Huttinger	Jennifer Aniston	Rob Reiner
2005	Assault on Precinct 13	Iris Ferry	Drea de Matteo	Jean-François Richet
2005	Harry Potter and the Goblet of Fire	Rita Skeeter	Miranda Richardson	Mike Newell
2010	The Ghost Writer	Ruth Lang	Olivia Williams	Roman Polanski
2010	Law Abiding Citizen	Sarah Lowell	Leslie Bibb	F. Gary Gray
2010	Cats & Dogs: The Revenge of Kitty Galore	Catherine	Christina Applegate	Brad Peyton
