= Tomorrow Is Ours =

French television series

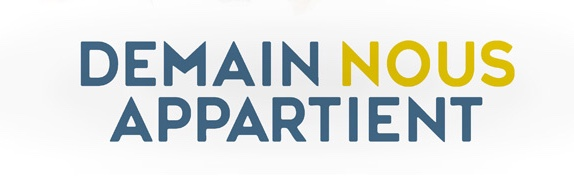
- French: Demain nous appartient
- Genre: Soap opera Police procedural Drama
- Created by: Frédéric Chansel; Laure de Colbert; Nicolas Durand-Zouky; Éline Le Fur; Fabienne Lesieur; Jean-Marc Taba
- Written by: Aurélie Belko; Frédéric Chansel; Laure De Colbert; Nicolas Durand-Zouky; Eline Le Fur; Marine Flores-Ruimi; Claire Kanny; Sylvie Rivière; Marie Du Roy; Carine Hazan; Marie Vinoy; Julie Albertine Simonney; Anaïse Wittmann; Anne-Elisabeth Le Gal; Fabienne Lesieur; Nicolas Chrétien; Monica Rattazzi; Jean-Marc Taba
- Directed by: Benoît d'Aubert; Pierre Leix-Cote; Denis Thybaud
- Starring: Ingrid Chauvin; Lorie Pester; Charlotte Valandrey; Alexandre Brasseur; Maud Baecker; Samy Gharbi; Clément Rémiens; Solène Hébert
- Theme music composer: Fabien Nataf
- Opening theme: Nos Lendemains by Vianney (since episode 1000); Demain by Lou (episodes 1-999)
- Country of origin: France
- Original language: French
- No. of seasons: 7
- No. of episodes: 1720

Production
- Executive producers: Vincent Meslet; Sophie Ferrario; Sarah Farahmand
- Producers: Guillaume de Menthon; Florence Levard
- Production locations: Sète, Hérault
- Cinematography: Thierry Deschamp; Dominique Delapierre; Fabrice Moindrot
- Running time: 26 minutes
- Production company: Telfrance

Original release
- Network: TF1 (France); La Une (Belgium); RTS Un (Switzerland); Séries Plus/TV5 (Québec, Canada); Fox Life Italia (Italy); France Channel (United States)
- Release: 17 July 2017 – present

Tomorrow is Ours (French: Demain nous appartient) is a French television soap opera created by Frédéric Chansel, Laure de Colbert, Nicolas Durand-Zouky, Éline Le Fur, Fabienne Lesieur and Jean-Marc Taba. It was first broadcast on TF1 on 17 July 2017.

== Cast ==
=== Main cast ===
The opening titles change regularly to feature the characters involved in the current storylines.

Actor	Character	Seasons
Ingrid Chauvin	Chloé Delcourt	1-2-3-4-5-6-7
Alexandre Brasseur	Alexandre "Alex" Bertrand	1-2-3-4-5-6-7
Charlotte Valandrey	Laurence Moiret	1-2-3
Lorie Pester	Lucie Salducci	1-2-4
Maud Baecker	Anna Delcourt	1-2-3-5-6
Samy Gharbi	Karim Saeed	1-2-3-4-5-6-7
Clément Rémiens	Maxime Delcourt-Bertrand	1-2-3-4-5
Solène Hébert	Victoire Lazzari	1-2-3-4-5-7
Anne Caillon	Flore Vallorta	1-2-3-4-5
Juliette Tresanini	Sandrine Lazzari	1-2-3-4-5-6
Hector Langevin	Barthélémy "Bart" Vallorta	1-2-3-4
Ariane Séguillon	Christelle Moreno	1-2-3-4-5
Lou Jean	Betty Moreno	1-2-3-4-5
Arnaud Henriet	Sylvain Moreno	1-2-3-4-5-6
Jean-Baptiste Lamour; Théo Cosset	Arthur Lazzari-Moiret	1-2; 2-3-4
Samira Lachhab	Leïla Beddiar	1-2-3-4
Axel Kiener	Samuel Chardeau	1-2-3-4-5
Coline Bellin; Sylvie Filloux; Alice Varela	Judith Delcourt-Bertrand	1; 1-2; 3-4-5-6
Linda Hardy	Clémentine Doucet	1-2-3-4
Mayel Elhajaoui	Georges Caron	1-2-3-4-6
Vanessa Demouy	Rose Latour	2-3-4
Marie Catrix	Morgane Guého	2-3-4-5-6
Kamel Belghazi	William Daunier	2-3-4-5-6
Julie Debazac	Aurore Jacob	2-3-4-5-6
Emma Smet	Sofia Daunier-Jacob	2-3-4-5
Maïna Grézanlé; Louvia Bachelier	Manon Daunier-Jacob	2-3-4; 4-5-6
Arthur Legrand; Martin Mille	Gabriel Guého	2-3; 4-5-6
Frédéric Diefenthal	Antoine Myriel	3-4
Laura Dary	Laura Kléber	3-4
Renaud Roussel	Sacha Girard	4
Artémisia Toussaint	Solenne Girard	4
Antoine Cohaut	Ben Girard	4

=== Notable recurring cast ===
These characters have appeared in at least 100 episodes:

Actor	Character	Seasons
Luce Mouchel	Marianne Delcourt	1-2-3-4
Kenza Saïb-Couton	Soraya Beddiar	1-2-3-4
Marysole Fertard	Margot Robert	1-2-3
Franck Monsigny	Martin Constant	1-2-3-4
Atmen Kelif	Bilel Beddiar	1-2-3-4
Sahelle de Figueiredo	Noor Beddiar	1-2-3-4
Camille Genau	Sara Raynaud	1-2-3-4
Garance Teillet	Jessica Moreno	1-2-3
Joaquim Fossi	Dylan Moreno	1-2-3
Sandrine Salyères	Gwen	1-2
Rani Bheemuck	Lou Clément	1-2-3-4
Mathieu Alexandre	Tristan Girard	1-2-3-4
Pierre Deny	Renaud Dumaze	1-2-3-4
Liam Baty	Rémy Valski	1-2-3-4
Cyril Garnier	Thomas Delcourt	1-2-3-4
Farouk Bermouga	Victor Brunet	1-2-3-4
Grégoire Champion	Timothée Brunet	2-3-4
Clémence Lassalas	Charlie Molina	2-3-4
Marion Christmann	Amanda Faro	2-3-4
Audrey Looten	Virginie Corkas	2-3-4
Xavier Widhoff	Jules Corkas	2-3-4
Martin Daquin	Luke Molina	2-3-4
Dembo Camilo	Souleymane Myriel	3-4
Catherine Jacob	Brigitte Daunier	4
Francis Perrin	Régis Daunier	4

== Episodes ==
Season	Episodes		Main story arcs		Originally aired	
Season	Episodes		Main story arcs		First aired	Last aired
1	246	1 to 246	12	1 to 12	17 July 2017	13 July 2018
2	260	247 to 506	13	13 to 25	17 July 2018	12 July 2019
3	200	507 to 706	10	26 to 35	15 July 2019	10 July 2020
4	285	707 to 991	15	36 to 50	13 July 2020	13 August 2021
5	270	992 to 1261	17	51 to 67	16 August 2021	29 August 2022
6	234	1262 to 1495	16	68 to 83	30 August 2022	18 August 2023
7	265	1496 to 1761	21	84 to 100	21 August 2023	6 September 2024
8	TBA	From 1762	TBA	From 101	9 September 2024	TBA
