= Oreste Cortazzo =

Italian painter

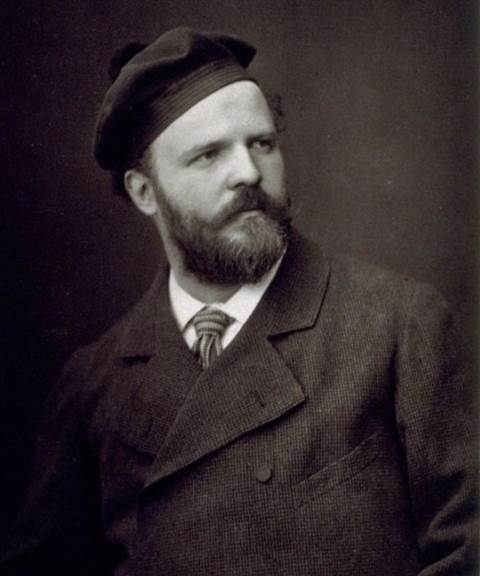
Oreste Cortazzo (c.1878)

Oreste Cortazzo (26 April 1836, Rome – 1910, Paris) was an Italian-born French painter, graphic artist and illustrator.

== Biography ==
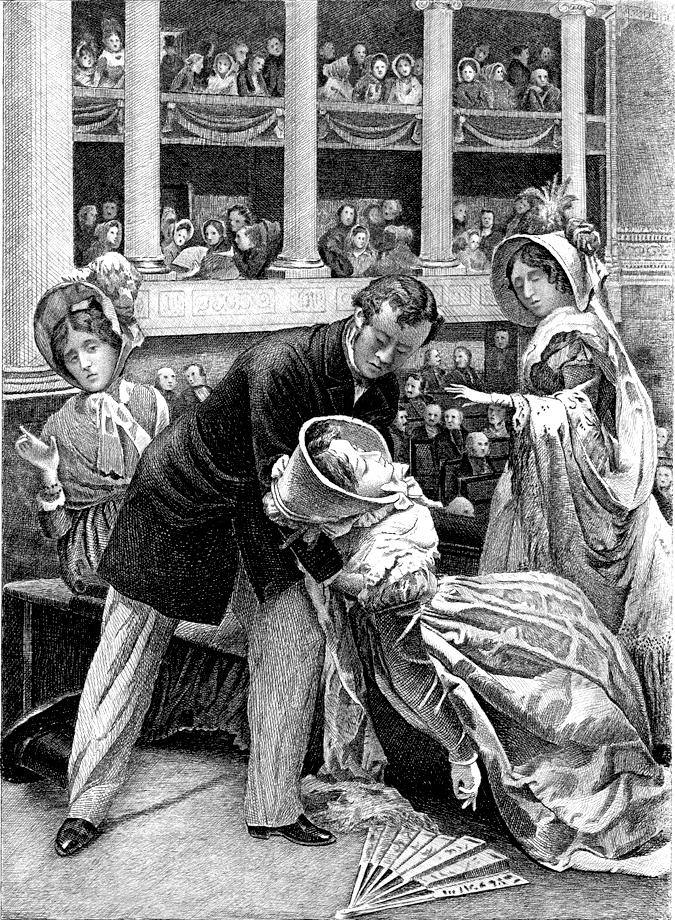
Illustration from Le Député d'Arcis

His family originally came from Ceraso, in the Province of Salerno. Around 1848, he began an apprenticeship with his father, Michele (c.1808-1865), who was also a painter and a great admirer of Titian. (Some of Michele's works may be seen at the Palace of Caserta, near Naples.)

In 1858, he met Léon Bonnat, who was studying in Rome. When Bonnat returned to Paris in 1860, Cortazzo decided to go with him; to take lessons and work in his studio. Having had a conservative education, he struggled to choose sides in the dispute between the Academics and the Impressionists.

He initially earned his living doing portraits for a largely bourgeois clientele and producing genre scenes on commission for Goupil & Cie. He was, however, attracted by more "exotic" styles; especially Japanese painting. As a result, he created two works: "Japanese Fantasy" and "Japanese Woman", although they still displayed aspects of the Academic style. Some of his works also show the influence of photography.

From 1870 to 1885, he was a regular participant in showings at the Salon. He also exhibited at the Exposition Universelle (1878) and the International Exhibition of Science, Art and Industry in Glasgow. After that, he derived inspiration from the English Romantics and produced numerous landscapes in that style. His works received honorable mention at the Exposition Universelle (1889).

He also illustrated several works by Balzac, including the novels, La Rabouilleuse, Le Député d'Arcis, Albert Savarus and Un début dans la vie; the novelette, Peines de cœur d'une chatte anglaise and the essays, Petites misères de la vie conjugale, and Physiologie du mariage. He was also one of several artists who provided drawings for a lavish edition of Romeo and Juliet; published in London in 1890 by Raphael Tuck & Sons.

Many of his paintings were acquired by Léon Bonnat and are currently at the Musée Bonnat-Helleu in Bayonne.

== Selected paintings ==
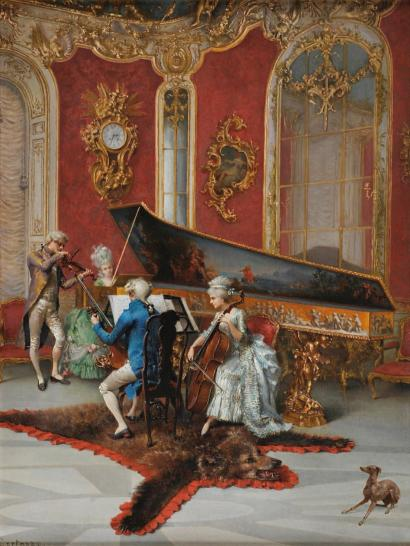
Concert in the Days of Louis XV

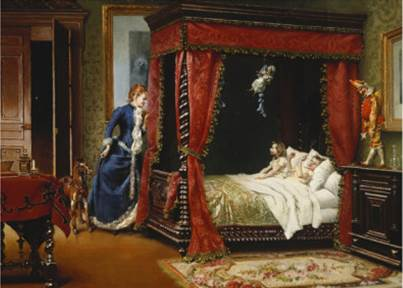
Bed Time

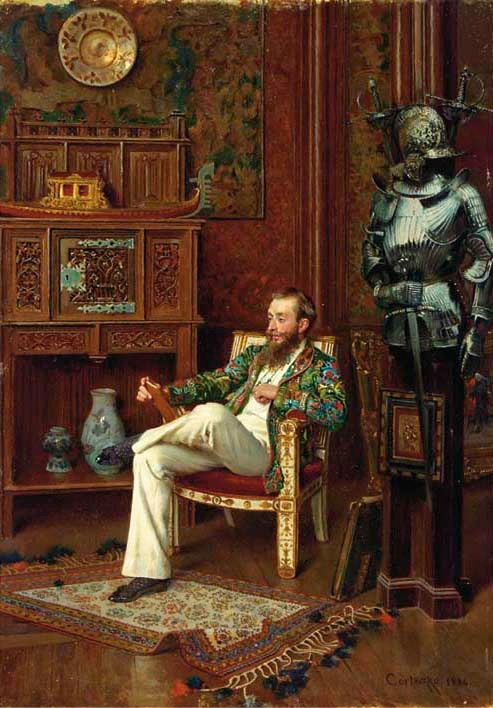
Michał Tyszkiewicz

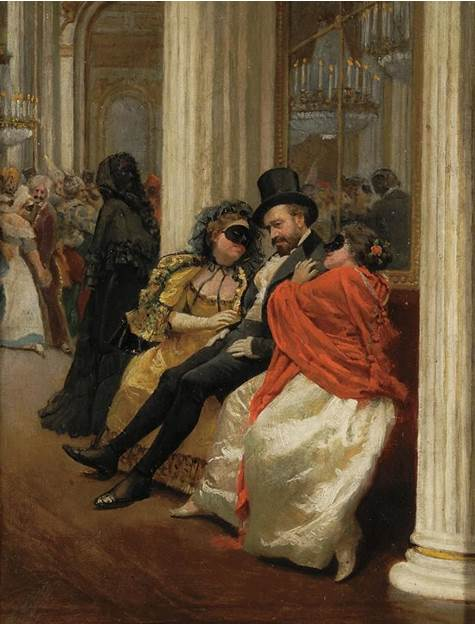
A Corner at the Opera
