= SK Broadband =

Seoul-based telecommunications company

SK Broadband, Inc.
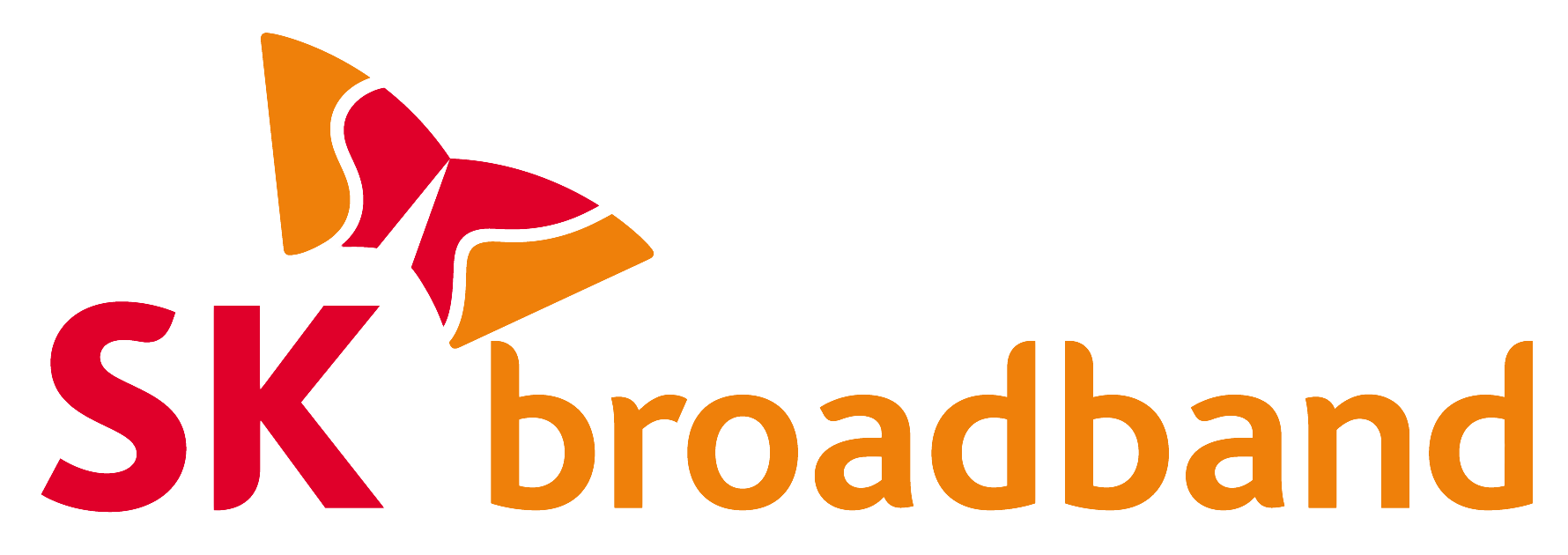
- Formerly: Hanaro Telecom, Inc.
- Type: Subsidiary
- Traded as: KRX: 033630
- Industry: Telecommunications
- Founded: September 23, 1997 as Hanaro Telecom; September 22, 2008 as SK Broadband
- Headquarters: Seoul, South Korea
- Key people: Jin-Hwan Choi (CEO)
- Services: Voice (Fixed-line/VoIP); Broadband Internet; Cable TV; Leased lines IPTV
- Revenue: ▲KRW 1,314,981 million (Q2 2015)
- Parent: SK Group
- ASN: 9318
- Website: skbroadband.com

SK Broadband, Inc. (Korean: SK브로드밴드; KRX: 033630; formerly Hanaro Telecom) is a Seoul-based telecommunications company and a wholly owned subsidiary of SK Telecom. It is one of the largest broadband Internet access providers in South Korea. Until its takeover in 2008, Hanaro controlled nearly half of the Korean landline market, as it was the only last mile-competitive local exchange carrier (CLEC) other than the state-owned KT Corp. SK Broadband also has a division known as "Broad &" that controls a large portion of the South Korean calling card market.

In October 2014, SK Broadband unveiled the world's first 10 Gbit/s Internet service at the ITU Plenipotentiary Conference. The new Internet service is 100 times faster than existing LAN services in South Korea, which deliver download speeds of 100 Mbit/s.

== History ==
Originally a domestic fixed-line carrier, Hanaro Telecom entered the broadband market in 1999 and grew from there to become a 'Triple-Play' provider with VoIP service, broadband Internet and an IPTV service branded as B.TV. In addition, Hanaro Telecom provides leased line services and IDC services to its corporate clients.

Since 2000, Hanaro has participated in the Cisco Powered Network Program, a joint marketing program between Cisco and network service providers which offers public services over a network powered by Cisco Systems equipment. Hanaro Telecom and Korea Thrunet shared about 45 percent of the broadband market, with Korea Telecom, South Korea's incumbent telecommunications operator, commanding around 50 percent as of 2002. To consolidate its position in the broadband market, Hanaro acquired its second largest rival, Korea Thrunet, in March 2005 for 471.4 billion won ($460 million); the final price was five percent less than Hanaro's original offer to outbid Dacom.

In February 2008, Hanaro Telecom was acquired by local wireless giant SK Telecom for 1.09 trillion won ($1.2 billion). Its new name, SK Broadband, was adopted in September 2008. In 2015, SK Telecom bought all of SK Broadband's stocks in a stock swap deal, the deal was finalized on July 1, 2015, and SK Broadband became a wholly owned subsidiary of SK Telecom.

In November 2015, SK Telecom agreed to acquire a 30% stake in competitor CJ HelloVision for KRW 500 billion. The acquisition will make SK Broadband the No. 2 paid cable broadcaster in South Korea, following KT.

In September 2021, SK Broadband sued American pay television service Netflix to pay for the increased network costs and bandwidth which it blames on popular shows such as Squid Game. SK Broadband claims that Netflix's traffic on the ISP network has exponentially increased about 24 times, from 50 Gigabits per second in May 2018 to 1,200 Gigabits in September 2021.

== Stock market listings ==
- KOSDAQ
- NASDAQ (ADR) as Hanaro Telecom (ticker symbol HANA)

== See also ==
- SK Telecom
- IPTV
- Internet in South Korea
