= B TV =

IPTV service in South Korea

B TV is an IPTV service in South Korea provided by SK Broadband. It provides a variety of video on demand TV content and value added services using an IPTV set top box connected to a Broadband Connection also provided by SK Broadband.

== History ==
- July 2006 – Launching B TV
- January 2007 – Launching Triple Play Service - (TV + Broadband Internet + Telephone)
- February 2007 – Launching Online Shopping Services
- April 2007 – Launching Value Added Service
- July 2007 – Reached 0.5 million subscribers
- April 2008 – Surpassed 0.9 million subscribers
- December 2011 – Launched a Linear TV service offering 80 Television channels
