= South Pacific Pictures =

New Zealand television production company

Coordinates: 36.85612°S 174.63870°E

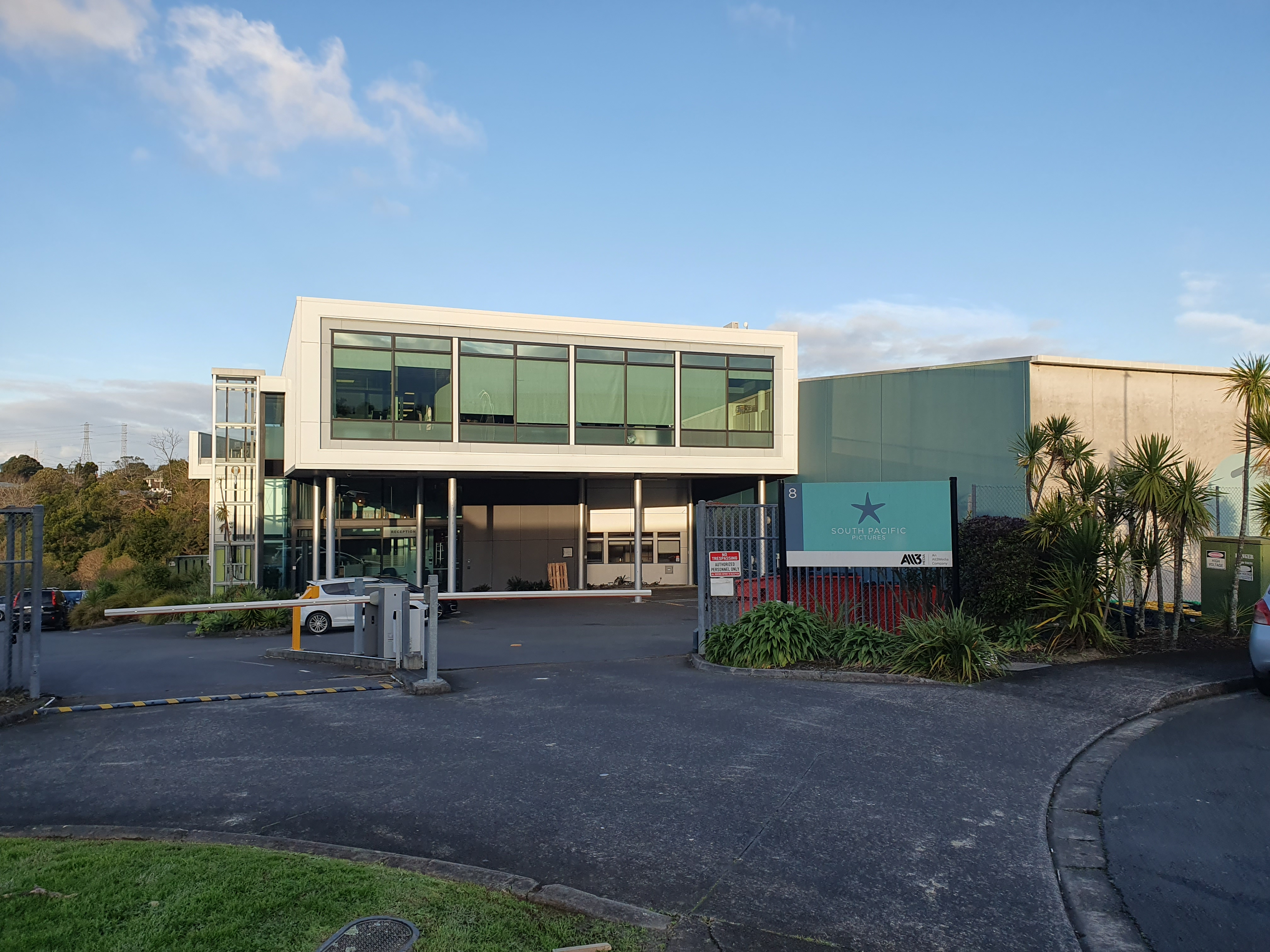
- Type: Subsidiary
- Industry: Television production
- Founded: 1988; 38 years ago
- Founder: John Barnett
- Headquarters: Auckland, New Zealand
- Key people: Kelly Martin (CEO); John Barnett (CEO, 1998–2015)
- Parent: TVNZ (1988–1998); All3Media (2003–2026); Banijay Entertainment (2026–present)
- Subsidiaries: SLR Productions (2003–present); Kura Productions; Satellite Media
- Website: southpacificpictures.com

South Pacific Pictures is a New Zealand television production company. The company produces drama series, mini-series, telemovies and feature films for the domestic market and international market. SPP's largest property is Shortland Street the half-hour soap opera for TVNZ 2. In 2006, the company released Sione's Wedding and in 2002, the Oscar-nominated feature film Whale Rider. In 1998 the company produced the feature film, What Becomes of the Broken Hearted?, the sequel to Once Were Warriors.

South Pacific Pictures was first established in 1988 by New Zealand broadcasting company TVNZ as its in-house drama television production arm that would develop and produce high-quality television drama for TVNZ's channels domestically, it was formed when TVNZ had a massive restructuring of the network and the introduction of "Strategic Business Units" within the TVNZ corporation in 1988, TVNZ disbanded its internal Drama Department and spun off its core drama production unit into a new production subsidiary within TVNZ called South Pacific Pictures, which would produce programming in-house for TVNZ & its channels, with John Barnett serving as founder & CEO of the TVNZ's in-house drama production arm South Pacific Pictures. However, six years later in 1998, TVNZ had sold its drama production unit South Pacific Pictures to its founder & CEO John Barnett though a management buyout and became an independent production company & British TV production group Chrysalis Visual Entertainment, the television arm of Chrysalis Group, had brought a 33% stake in the New Zealand independent production company South Pacific Pictures, marking Chrysalis Visual Entertainment's first entry into the New Zealand production market with South Pacific Pictures became a subsidiary of the British entertainment group Chrysalis Visual Entertainment with them would handle international distribution to South Pacific's future programming while New Zealand media and investment company Force Corporation had brought a 25% minority stake in South Pacific Pictures. By December 2001 when Chrysalis Visual Entertainment was renamed to Chrysalis TV Group during that same year back in February, Chrysalis TV Group had increased its stake in the New Zealand drama production company South Pacific Pictures by rising its stake from 33% to a 60% majority stake in the New Zealand production studio South Pacific Pictures with Chrysalis TV Group acquiring its remaining shares from Force Corporation and John Barlett's own production outfit Endeavour Productions, and South Pacific Pictures became a subsidiary of the British TV production company Chrysalis TV Group.

In May 2000, the company moved from Browns Bay (Auckland) to a new purpose-built studio complex in Henderson, West Auckland.

In October 2001, South Pacific Pictures had partnered with Australian entertainment & production company Beyond International to form a new joint-venture distribution subsidiary entitled Beyond New Zealand, that would serve as Beyond International's new production division and the first independent distribution company based in New Zealand and would be based in Auckland & would provide a gateway to the international television marketplace for New Zealand producers, with South Pacific Pictures' founder & MD John Barnett serving as manager of the new joint-venture production unit.

In June 2004, South Pacific Pictures had colloaborated with producer & presenter Quinton Hita and established a joint-venture production subsidiary dedicated to produce programming in Māori language for the Maori Television Service (MTS) as well as other broadcasting networks in New Zealand, entitled Kura Productions. The new joint-venture production subsidiary Kura Productions will produce Māori-language programming for broadcasters in New Zealand while South Pacific Pictures will support development funding for the new subsidiary.

SPP is in a joint venture with Australian company SLR Productions to produce animated shows aimed at international markets and also has a 50% interest in Satellite Media and has also created a joint venture known as Kura Productions with Quinton Hita to produce programming for the Māori Television Service.

South Pacific Pictures was founded by CEO John Barnett.

== Film ==
Title	Year	Notes
The Girl from Mars	1991	Canadian–New Zealand–American co–production
The End of the Golden Weather	1991	
What Becomes of the Broken Hearted?	1999	
Jubilee	2000	
Whale Rider	2002	New Zealand–German co-production
Sione's Wedding	2006	
We're Here to Help	2007	
The Secret of Moonacre	2008	French–British–Hungarian–American co-production
My Wedding and Other Secrets	2011	
Sione's 2: Unfinished Business	2012	
White Lies	2013	
This Town	2020	

== Television ==
=== Current productions ===
Key
†	Denotes television programs that have not yet aired.

Title	Genre	First air date	No. of series	Network	Co-production company	Notes
Shortland Street	Soap opera	25 May 1992	30	TVNZ 2	Grundy Television (1992–2006); Fremantle Australia (2006–2023); All3Media International (2023–present)	
The Brokenwood Mysteries	Crime drama	28 September 2014	8	Prime (2014–19); TVNZ 1 (2021–)		
Educators	Sitcom	8 May 2019	2	TVNZ+		Web series
Mean Mums	Sitcom	16 July 2019	2	Three		
Head High	Drama	28 June 2020	2	Three		
Last at 11	Mockumentary	21 February 2021	1	TVNZ 1		
Travel Guides New Zealand	Travel	18 February 2021	1	TVNZ 2		
Snack Masters	Cooking competition	20 April 2022	1	TVNZ 2		
Sort Your Life Out NZ	Reality	22 June 2022	1	Three		
Duckrockers	Comedy	2 November 2022	1	TVNZ 2		
The Traitors NZ	Reality Competition	7 August 2023	2 (+ 1 upcoming)	Three		
Far North †	Drama				White Balance Pictures	
The Traitors Australia †	Reality Competition	2026	1	Network 10		Previous seasons produced by Endemol Shine Australia

=== 1980s ===
Title	Genre	First air date	Last air date	No. of series	Network	Co-production company	Notes
Space Knights	Children's	15 July 1989	16 December 1989	1	Channel 2	Seven Network; Vid-Com	

=== 1990s ===
Title	Genre	First air date	Last air date	No. of series	Network	Co-production company	Notes
Gold	Drama	1990	1990	1	TVNZ	Atlantis Films	
Raider of the South Seas	Children's	10 February 1990	30 March 1990	1	TVNZ	Atlantis Films	Production services only
Betty's Bunch	Children's	18 February 1990	13 May 1990	1	Channel 2		
All for One	Children's	20 May 1990	8 July 1990	1	TVNZ	Atlantis Films	
African Journey	Children's	15 July 1990	18 August 1990	1	Channel 2	Atlantis Films	
Star Runner	Children's	7 April 1991	26 May 1991	1	TVNZ	Atlantis Films	
The Boy from Andromeda	Children's	2 June 1991	7 July 1991	1	Channel 2	Atlantis Films	
The Ray Bradbury Theater	Anthology	3 January 1992	30 October 1992	2	USA Network	Alliance Atlantis; Bradshaw MacLeod & Associates (season 5); Wilcox Productions; Western International Communications	Seasons 5 and 6
The Other Side of Paradise	Drama	22 February 1992	14 March 1992	1	ITV	Central Independent Television; Grundy Television	Miniseries; Production services only
Growing Rich	Fantasy	28 February 1992	3 April 1992	1	ITV	Anglia	Production services only
Marlin Bay	Drama	27 August 1992	16 November 1994	3	TV One		
Kurt Vonnegut's Monkey House	Anthology	21 December 1992	4 April 1993	1	Showtime	Altantis Films; Crescent Entertainment; B.C Film	Season 2
White Fang	Adventure	1993	1994	1	M6	Neverland Studios; Falcon Productions; Alliance Atlantis	Production services only
Deepwater Haven	Drama	10 July 1993	15 January 1994	1	Channel 2	F Productions; Beyond International	
Soldier Soldier	Drama	7 September 1993	30 November 1993	1	ITV	Central Independent Television	Production services only (season 3)
Mrs. Piggle–Wiggle	Children's	30 May 1994	1994	1	Showtime	Think Entertainment; Universal Family Entertainment	Production services only
Fallout	Drama	24 July 1994	31 July 1994	1	TV One		Miniseries
Plainclothes	Drama	15 March 1995	6 September 1995	2	TV One		
Riding High	Children's	31 December 1995	27 July 1996	1	TV2		Production services only
City Life	Drama	15 July 1996	19 February 1998	1	TV2		
House of Sticks	Drama	9 November 1997		—N/a	TV One		Montana Sunday Theatre stand-alone pilot
Tales of the South Seas	Drama	3 February 1998	30 June 1998	1	Network Ten	CLT-UFA; Gaumont Télévision; Village Roadshow Pictures	
Market Forces	Sitcom	31 March 1998	17 July 1999	2	TV One		
McPhail & Gadsby	Satire	11 June 1998	23 July 1998	1	TV One		
Double Booking	Comedy	4 July 1998		—N/a	TV One		Comedy Playhouse stand-alone pilot
Jackson's Wharf	Drama	22 June 1999	16 February 2001	2	TV2		

=== 2000s ===
Title	Genre	First air date	Last air date	No. of series	Network	Co-production company	Notes
Mercy Peak	Drama	25 July 2001	19 March 2004	3	TV One		
Being Eve	Teen drama	25 August 2001	12 July 2002	2	TV3		
Mataku	Anthology	3 October 2002	19 December 2002	2	TV3		A third series was produced by 4 Winds Films
New Zealand Idol	Reality competition	1 February 2004	29 October 2006	3	TV2	Grundy Television	
Kidnapped	Adventure	27 February 2005	13 March 2005	1	BBC One		Miniseries
Outrageous Fortune	Comedy-drama	12 July 2005	9 November 2010	6	TV3		
Interrogation	Crime drama	31 August 2005	23 November 2005	1	Prime TV		
Maddigan's Quest	Fantasy	26 January 2006	16 February 2006	1	BBC One; Nine Network; TV3	Burberry Productions	
How Clean Is Your House?	Reality	15 February 2006	July 2007	2	TV One		
Wa$ted!	Reality	20 February 2007	8 April 2008	2	TV3	Fumes TV	
HotSpell	Game show	24 August 2007	2 September 2007	1	SBS	Heiress Films	
Captain Cook – Obsession and Discovery	Documentary	28 October 2007	18 November 2007	1	ABC Television; Prime	Film Australia; Cook Films; Ferns Productions; History Television; December Films	
New Zealand's Got Talent	Talent show	8 September 2008	28 October 2008	1	Prime		Imagination Television took over production after series 1
Go Girls	Comedy-drama	19 February 2009	16 July 2013	5	TV2		
Diplomatic Immunity	Sitcom	10 March 2009	9 June 2009	1	TV One		

=== 2010s–20s ===
Title	Genre	First air date	Last air date	No. of seasons	Network	Co-production company	Notes
Scoundrels	Comedy-drama	20 June 2010	15 August 2010	1	ABC	Old Friends Productions; Long Run Productions; ABC Studios	
Rivers with Craig Potton	Documentary	12 September 2010	17 October 2010	1	Prime		
The Almighty Johnsons	Fantasy	7 February 2011	26 September 2013	3	TV3		
Nothing Trivial	Comedy-drama	20 July 2011	4 December 2013	3	TV One		
Wild Coasts with Craig Potton	Documentary	7 August 2011	4 September 2011	1	Prime		
Golden	Sitcom	17 June 2012	22 July 2012	1	TV3		
High Country Rescue	Documentary	26 November 2012	14 January 2013	1	TV One		
The Blue Rose	Crime drama	4 February 2013	29 April 2013	1	TV3		
Step Dave	Comedy-drama	11 February 2014	24 November 2015	2	TV2		
Tatau	Drama	12 April 2015	17 May 2015	1	BBC Three	Touchpaper	
Westside	Comedy-drama	31 May 2015	16 November 2020	6	Three		
Word Up	Game show	11 June 2015	3 September 2015	1	TV One		
800 Words	Comedy-drama	15 September 2015	2 October 2018	3	Seven Network	Seven Productions	
Forensics NZ	Documentary	24 April 2016	3 June 2018	2	Prime		
The Bad Seed	Crime drama	14 April 2019	18 April 2019	1	TVNZ 1	Jump Film & TV	
The Sounds	Mystery	3 September 2020	12 October 2020	1	Acorn TV	Shaftesbury Films; Acorn Media Enterprises	

=== Television films ===
Title	Genre	Air date	Network	Co-production company	Notes
The Rogue Stallion	Adventure	1990		Grundy Television	
Clarence	Comedy	24 November 1990	The Family Channel	Atlantis Films; NorthStar Entertainment Group	
Old Scores	Comedy	25 September 1991	TVNZ	HTV Cymru Wales	
The Sinking of the Rainbow Warrior	Drama	1992	ABC	Capital Cities/ABC Video Enterprises; Bonny Dore Productions; Ten Four Productions	Production services only
The Sound and the Silence	Drama	18 April 1992		Screen Star Entertainment; Atlantis Films; Kelcom International	Production services only
Adrift	Thriller	13 April 1993	CBS	Atlantis Films, Blue André Productions; W.I.C. CTV Television Network	Consultant
Lawless	Crime drama	26 June 1999	TV2		
Fearless	Drama	1999		Telescene	
Lawless: Dead Evidence	Crime drama	7 September 2000	TV2		
Lawless: Beyond Justice	Crime drama	22 February 2001	TV2		
Ihaka: Blunt Instrument	Drama	22 February 2002	TV3	Columbia TriStar Productions; Columbia TriStar Television; Screentime	
The Man Who Lost His Head	Drama	26 August 2007	TV One	Greenlit Rights	
Stolen	Drama	28 July 2010	TV3		
Spies and Lies	Drama	14 November 2010	TV One		
Nothing Trivial	Comedy-drama	3 August 2014	TV One		
In Dark Places	Drama	22 July 2018	TVNZ 1	10,000 Company	

== Film & television library from Subsidiaries ==
SLR Productions

- Deadly (2006; with Yoram Gross Productions)
- I Got a Rocket (2006–2007)
- Dex Hamilton: Alien Entomologist (2008–2009)
- Gasp! (2010–2011)
- The DaVincibles (2011)
- Guess How Much I Love You (2011–2017)
- Teenage Fairytale Dropouts (2012–2013)
- The Skinner Boys: Guardians of the Lost Secrets (2014–2017)
- Captain Flinn and the Pirate Dinosaurs (2015)
- Lexi & Lottie: Trusty Twin Detectives (2016–2017)
- Alice-Miranda Friends Forever (2019)
- Berry Bees (2019–2020)
- Space Nova (2021)
- Alice-Miranda: A Royal Christmas Ball (2021)

Live Action

- Sam Fox: Extreme Adventures (2014–2015)
