= MoonScoop =

French animated media company (2003–2014)

MoonScoop S.A.
- Logo used from 2003 to 2014
- Formerly: Antefilms Production (1990–2003)
- Type: Societe anonyme
- Predecessor: France Animation
- Founded: 1990; 36 years ago
- Founder: Christophe Di Sabatino; Benoît Di Sabatino
- Defunct: January 24, 2014; 12 years ago
- Fate: Administration; French operations acquired by Ellipsanime; US operations rebranded to Splash Entertainment
- Successor: Splash Entertainment (American unit); Mediatoon Distribution (French unit)
- Headquarters: Paris, France
- Subsidiaries: See § Subsidiaries
- Website: moonscoop.com at the Wayback Machine (archived 2012-02-06)

MoonScoop S.A., also known as the MoonScoop Group, was a French television production company and animation company that created and published animated television series. Its corporate headquarters were located in Paris, France, along with offices in the United Kingdom and the United States. It was established in 2003 and it is most famously known for Code Lyoko and its open-ended sequel series, Code Lyoko: Evolution.

== History ==
One of MoonScoop's predecessors was France Animation, founded in 1984, and based in Paris. France Animation was created by SOFIRAD who was in charge of its finances, but was controlled by its subsidiary Radio Monte Carlo, which adopted the name RMC Audiovisuel. It went on to become the original producers of Spartakus and the Sun Beneath the Sea. In 1987, SOFIRAD sold the animation studio, following the sale of RMC and Europe 1, the holding's main radio stations. In September 2003, the company was acquired from its then-owner Wanadoo by Antefilms Production—an outfit created by Christophe Di Sabatino and Benoît Di Sabatino in 1990. Both companies' distribution arms were merged in March 2004 to form the present day MoonScoop.

On January 24, 2014, the Commercial Court of Paris accepted Dargaud's takeover bid of MoonScoop's library after its bankruptcy, along with retaining the services of two employees handling the Code Lyoko license.

== Notable people ==
Brothers Christophe and Benoît Di Sabatino were the co-executive chairmen of the MoonScoop Group. Nicolas Atlan and Axel Dauchez were co-CEOs.

== Subsidiaries ==
MoonScoop was made up of numerous subsidiaries:

- Antefilms Studios, a French animation studio that produced TV shows. It was established by Christophe Di Sabatino and Benoît Di Sabatino in 1990. After Antefilms became MoonScoop, the company became Antefilms Studios
- France Animation, a French animation studio that produced TV shows. It was founded in 1984 and was absorbed in 2004.
- XANA Post-Production, a part of MoonScoop. It did the post-production for Code Lyoko.
- MoonScoop Entertainment (formerly known as Mike Young Productions), an American animation studio that produced TV shows such as ToddWorld and Growing Up Creepie. It was founded in 1990 by Mike Young, Liz Young, and Bill Schultz and is now known as Splash Entertainment.
  - Taffy Entertainment handled worldwide distribution, marketing and consumer products licensing for nearly all of the shows made by Mike Young Productions and MoonScoop. It was absorbed into the newly-named MoonScoop LLC in 2009.
- MoonScoop Digital Entertainment (formerly known as Queen Bee Interactive), French developer of interactive applications and broadcast services for television, mobile and the internet; it dissolved into Splash Entertainment.
- LuxAnimation, a Luxembourgish animation studio. It made Babar and the Adventures of Badou and the film Dragon Hunters.
- Kabillion is a video-on-demand network for children launched in 2007 available throughout the United States by many cable and streaming services. It is now owned by Splash Entertainment.

== Well-known shows ==
=== Code Lyoko ===
Code Lyoko is a French animated series featuring both conventional animation and computer-generated imagery, produced by Antefilms during the first season and MoonScoop during the second, in association with the France 3 television network and Canal J. Code Lyoko is about a group of four boarding school students enrolled at Kadic Junior High School, named Jeremie, Odd, Ulrich, and Yumi. The students try to help a virtual girl named Aelita leave the virtual world of Lyoko (found inside a supercomputer housed in the basement of an abandoned factory near their school), and enter the real world.

A highly malevolent and rogue artificial intelligence (also referred to as a multi-agent system, and wrongly as a computer virus) named X.A.N.A., bent on world domination, has taken over the quantum supercomputer in charge of the virtual reality/world of Lyoko. If the group is able to get Aelita to the activated tower(s) out of the more than forty scattered about four of Lyoko's five tropical regions, she can neutralize Xana's violently destructive attack on the real world; then the supercomputer can reverse time to just before the attack, leaving no one except the group to remember any of the events that transpired. To complicate the situation, they must do this while ensuring that their classmates and teachers are not killed (because going back in time cannot return those killed by X.A.N.A. to life), and deal with the various personality clashes they have with them at the same time.

=== Code Lyoko: Evolution ===
This rebooted series takes place one year after the events of the original series stated above. Unlike its predecessor, however, it consists of live-action for the real world but still contains the 3D computer animation for the virtual world of Lyoko, with the Ice/Polar and Forest Sectors having been deleted.

X.A.N.A. has been mysteriously reborn with even more strength than before. This prompts Jeremie, Ulrich, Odd, Yumi, and Aelita to reactive their well-hidden quantum supercomputer in order to return to Lyoko to obliterate the menacing A.I. once again. They are joined, again, by William Dunbar as the sixth member of their fighting team, and a girl-genius named Laura Gauthier; whom they are unsure to confide in.

Traveling into the digital sea inside their submersible submarine (which they had called the Skidbladnir), the five Lyoko Warriors come across another virtual world near Lyoko called the Cortex. However, as this new virtual region is ever-changing and chaotic, Jeremie programs a secondary vehicle called the Megapod with Odd as its pilot. In the very center, lies the Core/Heart of the Cortex itself and by investigating further, they all discover a new enemy just as dangerous as X.A.N.A. Professor Lowell Tyron − who seems unaware of X.A.N.A.'s existence within his own supercomputer. The Lyoko warriors must deal with constructing a strong enough virus to completely exterminate X.A.N.A. and stop Tyron, as well as the powerful team of Ninjas he virtualizes onto the Cortex to battle the five Lyoko avatars.

Even more puzzling is the fact that Aelita's own long-lost mother, Anthea Hopper, appears to be working with their new enemy. The group is determined to discover why she is working alongside Tyron and how to reunite mother and daughter. Jeremie succeeds in developing an anti-virus to eradicate X.A.N.A. once and for all and wipe out Professor Tyron's own data in the process. Unfortunately, Tyron eventually manages to find them at Kadic Academy; due to his connection to Aelita's mother, Anthea, and legality as Aelita's stepfather. Desperate to save his work, Tyron orders that his supercomputer be shut down, which gradually causes the Cortex to disintegrate. Luckily, Odd, Ulrich, William and Aelita all managed to escape permanent virtualization in the digital sea by mere minutes. With professor Tyron's quantum supercomputer shut off, Jeremie shuts off their own supercomputer; therefore rending X.A.N.A. dormant once again; not destroying it, therefore leaving the show open-ended.

=== Hero: 108 ===
A long time ago humans and animals lived together in harmony. But a wicked trickster named High Roller controlled 2 animals and tricked the other animals into thinking that humans were their enemies. Chaos reigned until a group of warriors, Lin Chung, Jumpy Ghostface, Mystique Sonia, Commander ApeTrully, Mr. No Hands, and Mighty Ray, had joined forces to end the war.

=== I Got a Rocket! ===
Vinnie Q got a present, a joke-making instrument with many gadgets.

=== Growing Up Creepie ===
Creepie was an infant left on the doorstep of the Dweezwold Mansion, which is home to a family of various anthropomorphic insects. The family took her in and raised her as one of their own. She must now adjust to a life surrounded by a society of entomophobic humans as she attends Middlington Middle School and keeps her home life secret in order to protect both herself and her family.

== Productions ==
As MoonScoop was the result of a merger between Antefilms and France Animation, this list consists of programming from both catalogs.

=== Television series ===
Title	Years	Network	Notes
Code Lyoko	2003–2007	France 3 & Canal J	continued from Antefilms Production
Fantastic Four: World's Greatest Heroes	2006–2010	M6; Cartoon Network Europe; Cartoon Network/Nicktoons (United States)	co-production with Marvel Studios
Bunny Maloney	2009–2011	Canal+ France 2	co-production with Telegael and France 2
Casper's Scare School	2009–2012	TF1; Cartoon Network (United States)	co-production with Classic Media and DQ Entertainment; Currently distributed by Mediatoon Distribution and NBCUniversal Global Distribution
My Phone Genie	2012	CITV (United Kingdom); KIKA (Germany)	co-production with ZDF Enterprises, Talent Television and Telegael; Currently owned by Mediatoon Distribution
Code Lyoko: Evolution	2013	France 4 & Canal J	co-production with Back-Up Media

- The Adventures of Marco & Gina
- Albert the Fifth Musketeer
- Au Coeur des Toiles
- Ava Riko Teo
- The Babaloos (season 4)
- The Birds
- The Busy World of Richard Scarry
- Care Bears: Welcome to Care-a-Lot
- C.L.Y.D.E. (co-production with CINAR)
- Chip et Charly
- Cosmic Quantum Ray
- The Country Mouse and the City Mouse Adventures
- Cybergirl
- Dr. Dog
- En Attendant Noël
- Fantastic Four: World's Greatest Heroes
- Flight Squad
- Fred des Cavernes
- Funky Cops
- Garage Kids (Pilot of Code Lyoko)
- Gasp!
- Geronimo Stilton
- Growing Up Creepie
- Horace and Tina
- Hero: 108
- Insectoscope
- I Got a Rocket!
- The DaVincibles
- The Invisible Man (co-production with BRB Internacional)
- It's Archie
- Journey to GloE
- The Jungle Book
- The Legend of White Fang
- Lionelville
- Lalaloopsy
- Les P'tits Diables (season 1)
- Mr. Roger
- Night Hood
- Nobeard the Pirate
- Nothing But Monsters
- Patrol 03
- Pet Alien
- The Power of Zhu (2012)
- Quick & Flupke
- The Race
- Rahan
- Robinson Sucroe
- Sabrina: Secrets of a Teenage Witch
- The Secret of Zhu
- SamSam
- Spartakus and the Sun Beneath the Sea
- Strawberry Shortcake's Berry Bitty Adventures
- Tara Duncan
- Tootuff
- The Twisted Whiskers Show
- Urmel
- Vampires, Pirates & Aliens
- Young Robin Hood
- Waiting for Christmas
- Wheel Squad
- Wild Grinders
- Wicked!
- Zevo-3 (with Skechers Entertainment)

=== Films ===
- Harry
- Tootuff the Movie
- Quest for Zhu
