= Guess How Much I Love You (TV series) =

Australian children's animated TV show

- Also known as: Guess How Much I Love You: The Adventures of Little Nutbrown Hare
- Genre: Fantasy; Adventure
- Based on: Guess How Much I Love You by Sam McBratney
- Directed by: Steve Moltzen
- Voices of: Ky Baldwin; Matthew Jacob Wayne; Andrew McFarlane; Bella Soleil Mistry; Nicholas Roye; Monique Hore; Angellique Perrin; Stuart Allan; Michaela Deen
- Narrated by: Kate Fitzpatrick
- Composers: Hylton Mowday; Ryan Grogan
- Countries of origin: Australia; Germany; Singapore (season 1)
- Original language: English
- No. of seasons: 2
- No. of episodes: 78

Production
- Executive producers: Suzanne Ryan; Gabriele Holzner; Patricia Vasapollo; Sebastian Debertin; Tina Sicker; Seng Choon Meng (season 1); Wong Chi Kong (season 1)
- Producers: Suzanne Ryan; Seng Choon Meng (season 1)
- Running time: 15 minutes per episode (approx.)
- Production companies: SLR Productions; Hessischer Rundfunk; Scrawl Studios (season 1)

Original release
- Network: ABC4Kids (Australia); Kika (Germany); TVOKids, Knowledge Kids and TFO (Canada); YLE (Finland); SVTB (Sweden)
- Release: 12 September 2011 – 24 December 2017

Guess How Much I Love You (full title: Guess How Much I Love You: The Adventures of Little Nutbrown Hare) is an Australian children's animated television series based on the series of books of the same name written by Sam McBratney.

Like in the original book, the series is set in the timeless watercolour landscape of mossy forests, lazy rivers and sunny meadows that is the idyllic home of Little Nutbrown Hare and his father, Big Nutbrown Hare.

Season 1 was co-produced by SLR Productions and Scrawl Studios for Kika and Hessischer Rundfunk, in association with TVOKids, Knowledge Kids, YLE and SVTB and with the participation of TFO, ABC Television and The Walt Disney Company Australia, and distributed by CCI Entertainment until 9 Story Media Group acquired CCI's children's and family library in 2013.

Season 2 was a co-production with SLR Productions, Kika and Hessischer Rundfunk, in association with the Australian Broadcasting Corporation.

== Cast and characters ==
- Home Plate Entertainment would do voice production services for the US dub, for 20 episodes.

Character	Australian dub	US dub
Narrator	Kate Fitzpatrick	Kat Cressida
Little Nutbrown Hare	Ky Baldwin	Matthew Jacob Wayne
Big Nutbrown Hare	Andrew McFarlane	Kirk Thornton
Little Field Mouse	Bella Soleil Mistry	Allie Carlton
Otter	Mark Owen-Taylor	Nicolas Roye
Little Redwood Fox	Monique Hore	Bianca Mercado
Little Grey Squirrel	Dylan Elchaar	Stuart Allan
Blue Bird	Kate Fitzpatrick	Angelique Perrin
Little White Owl	Monique Hore	Michaela Dean

== Episodes ==
=== Season 1 (2011–12) ===
No. in season	Title	Original release date
1	"Treasure Hunt"	TBA
2	"March Like an Ant"	TBA
3	"Blue Wonder"	TBA
4	"No Place Like Home"	TBA
5	"Favourite Thing"	TBA
6	"Big Like You"	TBA
7	"What Sound Does the Moon Make?"	TBA
8	"Autumn's Here"	TBA
9	"Snow Blanket"	TBA
10	"Snowflake"	TBA
11	"Inside Day"	TBA
12	"Slip Slop Slide"	TBA
13	"Lucky Stick"	TBA
14	"It's Okay"	TBA
15	"Where's Little Redwood Fox?"	TBA
16	"Hidden Treasures"	TBA
17	"Moon Dance"	TBA
18	"Winter Coat"	TBA
19	"Winter Surprise"	TBA
20	"New Friend"	TBA
21	"Snow White Hare"	TBA
22	"Field of Flowers"	TBA
23	"Fly the Nest"	TBA
24	"Blossoms"	TBA
25	"The Scents of Spring"	TBA
26	"Can You Touch the Stars?"	TBA
27	"Follow Me"	TBA
28	"The Nest"	TBA
29	"Hide and Seek"	TBA
30	"Feather Your Nest"	TBA
31	"Fly Away Home"	TBA
32	"Rainy Days"	TBA
33	"A Hare's Tail"	TBA
34	"Where Does the River Go?"	TBA
35	"Leaf Shade"	TBA
36	"Bedtime Story"	TBA
37	"Hare's Eye View"	TBA
38	"Taste of Sunset"	TBA
39	"You for a Day"	TBA
40	"Big Storm"	TBA
41	"Plum Summer"	TBA
42	"All Fall Down"	TBA
43	"I Promise"	TBA
44	"Pumpkin Patch"	TBA
45	"Shadow Play"	TBA
46	"Finders Keepers"	TBA
47	"Surprise!"	TBA
48	"The Big Apple"	TBA
49	"Chestnut"	TBA
50	"I Want to Fly"	TBA
51	"Four Seasons"	TBA
52	"Wind Whistle"	TBA

=== Season 2 (2015–16) ===
No. in season	Title	Original release date
1	"Little Green Worm"	TBA
2	"Make a Rainbow"	TBA
3	"The Favourite Tree"	TBA
4	"Spider's Web"	TBA
5	"Big Foot"	TBA
6	"Too Big, Too Small"	TBA
7	"Winter Moon"	TBA
8	"Up All Night"	TBA
9	"The Collection"	TBA
10	"The Lucky Egg"	TBA
11	"The Autumn Journey"	TBA
12	"The Song of Spring"	TBA
13	"Summer Strawberries"	TBA
14	"The Slippery Slide"	TBA
15	"Echo Game"	TBA
16	"Cloudy Meadow"	TBA
17	"Autumn Play"	TBA
18	"Now You See Me"	TBA
19	"Busy as a Bee"	TBA
20	"Birthday Surprise"	TBA
21	"Win or Lose"	TBA
22	"Summer Days"	TBA
23	"The Holly Branch"	TBA
24	"Topsy-Flopsy Day"	TBA
25	"Feast Day"	TBA
26	"Where Are My Acorns?"	TBA

=== Specials (2017) ===
No. in season	Title	Original release date
1	"Christmas to the Moon and Back"	TBA
2	"An Enchanting Easter"	TBA

== Production ==
Before the series adaptation was made, the book's original publisher Walker Books partnered with British animation studio King Rollo Films in 2005 to produce short films based on Walker Books' picture books including Guess How Much I Love You.

Five years later, in 2010, Australian animation studio SLR Productions acquired the rights to adapt Sam McBratney and Anita Jeram's picture book Guess How Much I Love You into a television adaptation. SLR Productions signed a co-production partnership with German children's channel Kika and Hessischer Rundfunk to co-produce the series. Canadian production & distribution studio CCI Entertainment and Singaporean company Scrawl Studios joined to the production as a co-producers, while CCI Entertainment acquired worldwide distribution to the series outside of Australia, New Zealand and Southeast Asia.

The series was renewed for the second season by Australian broadcasting network ABC Kids. SLR Productions, German network Kika and Hessischer Rundfunk returned to co-produce the season while 9 Story Media Group handled worldwide distribution and co-production to the series following 9 Story's acquisition of CCI Entertainment's children's programming library.

=== Animation ===
Co-producer Scrawl Studios handled animation production services for the first season with funding from Media Development Authority of Singapore (MDA), while Philippines animation studio Top Draw Animation (who handled animation services and co-produced SLR's fellow series Captain Flinn and the Pirate Dinosaurs and The Skinner Boys: Guardians of the Lost Secrets) took over animation services for the second season.

== Broadcast ==
The series was shown on Kika in Germany, e-Junior in the United Arab Emirates, TVOKids, Knowledge Kids and TFO in Canada, ABC Kids in Australia, SVTB in Sweden, Disney Junior in the United States, Nickelodeon in France and the United Kingdom, and YLE in Finland.

== Reception ==
The series was nominated for an AACTA Award for "Best Children's Television Series" in 2013.
