= FWY =

FWY may refer to:

- Five Ways railway station, in Birmingham, England
- Freeway
- FriendsWithYou, an American art collective
