= FriendsWithYou =

American art collaboration

- Formation: 2002
- Type: Sculpture, experimental art, installation art, performance art, public art, animation, spiritual engineering
- Location: Los Angeles
- Website: www.friendswithyou.com
- Remarks: Instagram: @FriendsWithYou

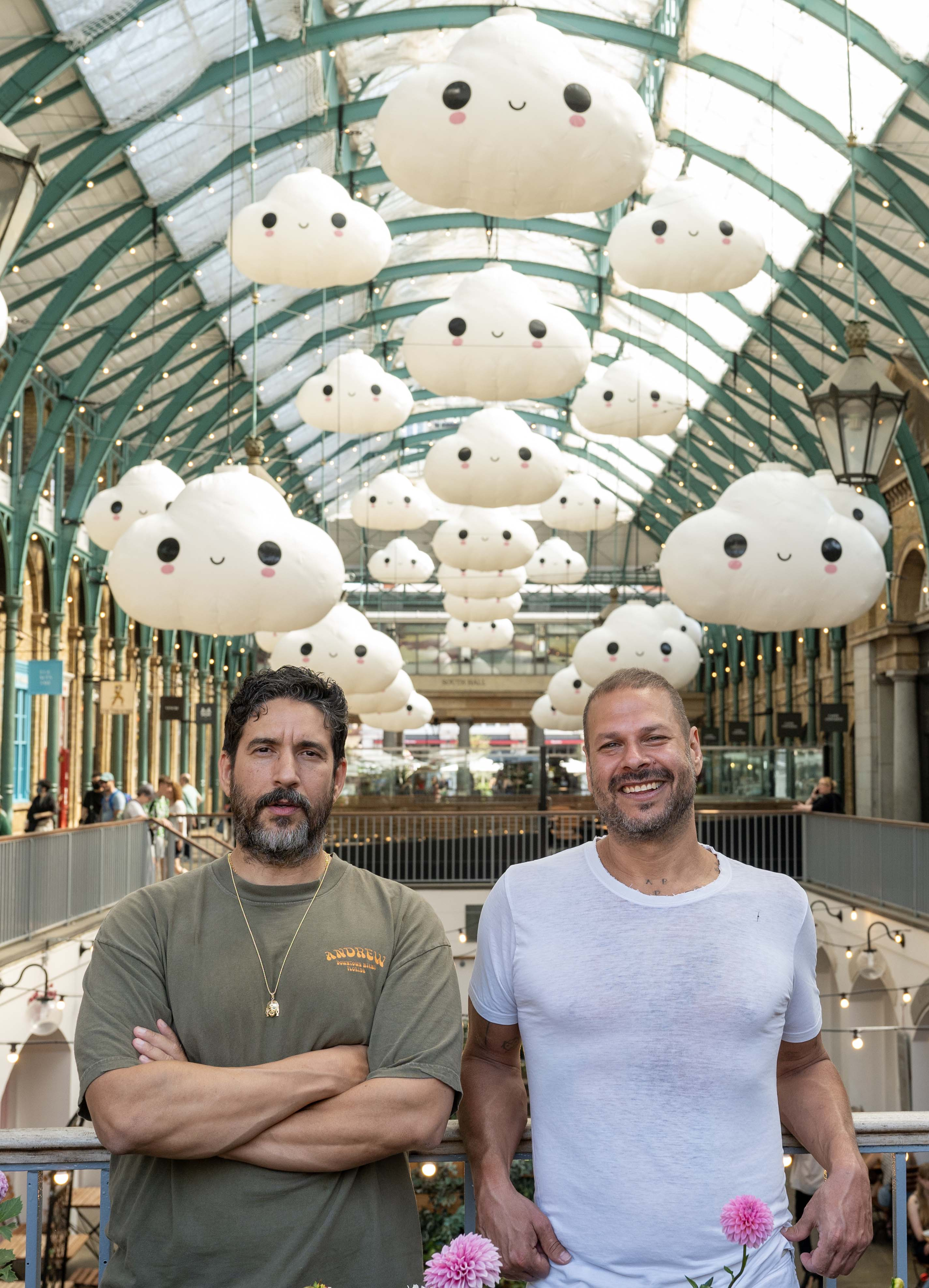

FriendsWithYou (FWY) is an art collaboration founded in 2002 and based in Los Angeles, California.

== History ==
FriendsWithYou was founded in Miami, Florida by Samuel Albert Borkson (b.1979, Plantation, Florida) and Arturo Sandoval III (born 1976, Havana, Cuba). In 2002, which seeks to redesign spirituality, rituals, and religious acts for modern-day usage and connectivity. FriendsWithYou's mission coincides with their motto "Magic, Luck, and Friendship."

The collaborative began by creating soft sculptures as a means to spread more accessible art like plush and wood toys, as well as immersive art installations, fine artworks including sculpture and painting, and are best known for their public art spectacles such as large-scale art installations, playgrounds, and performance pieces. They have described the creation of their art as a healing process intended to increase relatability and connection to each other and the world around them. They have held public exhibits and artworks in Europe, Asia, Australia, and The Americas.

FriendsWithYou Fine Art has been exhibited and/or included in the permanent collections of Museum of Contemporary Art (MOCA), the Indianapolis Museum of Art (IMA), Haus der Kulturen der Welt Museum Berlin, and Galerie Emmanuel Perrotin, among others. In October 2006, the German art press Die Gestalten Verlag published a FriendsWithYou monograph titled Friends With You Have Powers!

They have a website so here is link to the website https://friendswithyou.com/.

== Artwork and installations ==
FriendsWithYou has explained that their art is meant to "activate the social interaction of people as exploded and refracted by the Internet and elaborate new modes of interpersonal relationships." They use play as an artistic means to foster these relationships. Many FriendsWithYou works look like toys because they are meant for play as a means of interactive unstructured free association. FWY hopes that "through their artwork, the buried, neglected urges and yearnings that a seasoned art viewer may not expect to have activated; playfulness, laughter, and inquisitiveness are triggered, with an end result of feeling connected." FWY inverts the practice and usage of religious traditions, symbols, and spiritual practices through play to open a connection to the divine.

Conceptually, FriendsWithYou's experiential artwork is in conversation with Relational Aesthetics and the work of Jeff Koons, Takashi Murakami, and Damien Hirst. The collective has been compared to Takashi Murakami for their "superflat" approach to art.

=== Solo shows ===
Inner Vision in Between was featured at the MCLEMOI Gallery in Sydney, Australia from February 15 to April 11, 2013. The exhibition themes ran from the playful to the spiritual. It was also described as a minimal, peaceful, stoic, and occasionally foreboding journey from one chapter to another.

In The Beginning, featured at the Colette in Paris from August 29 to September 24, 2011. It consisted of bronze sculptures, a series of prints, including two exclusive edition prints solely for Colette, an animation video piece, and limited-run products, in addition to limited edition inflatable Malfi heads and Rainbow Mr. TTT bop bags.

Happy Rainbow, installed at the Tuen Mun Town Plaza, in Hong Kong from July 22 to September 2, 2012, was a colorful interactive bounce house that also featured fiberglass, plush, and resin sculpture installations. FWY designed the installation as a modern shrine which also embodies their themes of play and spirituality. "FWY hopes to evoke spiritual connectivity that will enlighten all visitors. Each piece in the exhibition is charged with so much color and power that it brings great harmony to all who look upon it," the group wrote.

:) at the Hole from June 10 to August 6, 2011, was FriendsWithYou's first solo exhibition in New York and the inaugural show at the Hole's new location. The show featured 22 FriendsWithYou artworks including a series of anthropomorphic figures created largely out of geometric abstractions made from Lasercut MDF, car paint, and acrylic. The show was described as "relentlessly cheerful," and “an interactive, experiential wonderland of pop-straction and participation.” Much like Murakami, Arturo Herrera, Yayoi Kusama, and others, FWY takes a spiritual and serene approach to form and figure in them :) exhibition. The artists consider these works to be part of the “service art” movement, allowing the viewer to easily understand their message and not be categorized as “pretentious art." FWY feels art is for everyone and can aid in connecting humankind.

Inner Space, The Secrets of the Unknown featured bright wooden sculptures, introspective metal beings, and FriendsWithYou's signature inflatable artwork. The installation ran at The Hole NYC annex in Miami from December 1, 2011, to January 28, 2012. FWY explained that, “the pieces on display are figurative self-reflective treasures, levitating in a space continuum, revealing something otherwise inaccessible."

Building Blocks, featured at Art Basel in Miami from December 2, 2010, to January 8, 2011, featured FriendsWithYou's trademark playful inflatables as well as prints. The installation consisted of paintings created over the course of a decade. The paintings were meant to be flat extensions of FriendsWithYou's existing sculptural, graphical and experiential installation works and were created to allow or encourage viewers to project their own emotions. The pieces were presented alongside the series of paintings, FWY exhibited select sculptural pieces, meant to illustrate the progression between their installation and the “portraiture.”

Rainbow City was an interactive installation containing minimalist inflatable forms from 8' to 50' borrowing their aesthetics from toy-like geometries and designs. Originally commissioned in 2010 by the Luminato Arts Foundation in Toronto, Canada, Rainbow City was then exhibited at Art Basel Miami 2010 presented by Paper Magazine, Pharrell Williams, and AOL. About 20,000 people visited the installation and were able to participate by bouncing about inside the inflatable structures and wandering in and around the surreal landscape. On June 6, 2010, to open section 2 of the High Line in New York City, a collection of 40 air-filled sculptures filled 16,000 square feet of outdoor space in Chelsea. It was FWY's first large scale interactive installation in New York City. According to the artists, Rainbow City was created to allow the viewer to reinterpret spirituality. The large totems represented self-reflective portraits, in line with FWY's goal of evoking visitors to see their emotions and own self within the sculptural pieces. Visitors were encouraged to come and “be in awe of these large, reduced shaped and simple totems,” stated Arturo Sandoval III. By evoking play through a very simple form, FriendsWithYou feels an almost religious scenario of connectivity is created in this interactive installation.

The Fun House, described as "a giant, anthropomorphic bounce house intended to help unleash the visitors’ inner brats and in doing so, take advantage of the healing power of fun," was originally commissioned by 944 magazines and the Hard Rock Hotel in Las Vegas in 2008. It grew as the installation traveled around the world. As a part of Art Basel Miami 2008 FriendsWithYou was the main featured artist at the Scope Art Fair. Their Fun House installation (December 3rd to December 7th) featured a large bounce house with a smiling face design, filled with inflatable balls, a bounce house, a romper room, restaurant, and a FWY store and fine art gallery. It was also installed at the Welt Museum in Berlin from March 19th to May 3rd, 2009. and the Nada Art Fair, New York.

Dream Maker was an installation of rotating spherical objects with faces similar to a miniature solar system. It was installed at the Indianapolis Museum of Art from May 2, 2008, to November 9, 2008.

Rainbow Valley is a playground designed by FriendsWithYou located at the Aventura Mall in Miami. It was commissioned as a part of the mall’s “Turnberry for the Arts” program, which was founded to help promote the arts by “displaying world-class artwork created by both celebrated contemporary artists and talented local artists in Aventura and the surrounding Miami area.” Other artists in the collection include Daniel Arsham, Louise Bourgeois, Julian Opie, Tom Otterness, Gary Hume, Lawrence Weiner and Jorge Pardo. It opened on December 21, 2006, and was their first permanent installation. The playground has rainbow bridges, slides, a control center, crawl-in mountains in bright colors and the entire area is foam-covered. The installation was meant to foster creativity in children through its interactivity though a storyline of a small mountain, who loses his family on a search to play with other mountains. "The playground will guide children through Peeko, the baby mountain, and his adventure with Cloudy, his new found friend, to the magical Rainbow Valley." Wired described it as "a warped Mario Brothers level"

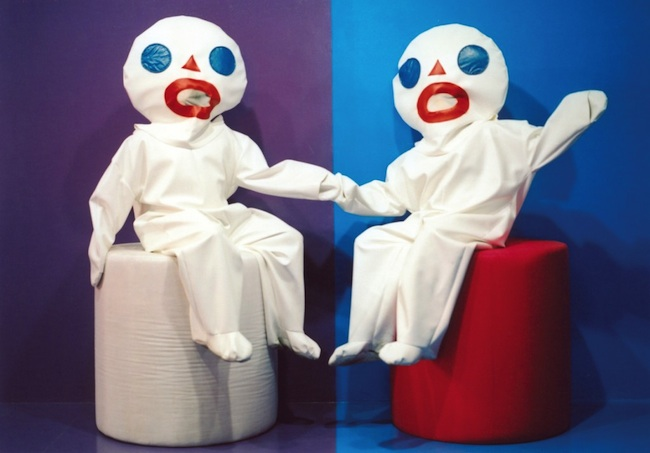
Cloud City

Cloud City opened in 2005 at the MOCA warehouse during the annual Art Basel in Miami. It was set up as an interactive playground composed of geometric shapes such as inflatable spheres, padded 10-foot cones on casters, and pillowed cylinders. The oversized geometric forms and colors invited participation on the part of the viewers in Cloud City, "an adventurous dream world playground designed to reinvigorate audiences with childlike energy and optimism." Several of the objects replicated the facial design of their character The boy. The central figure in this installation, The boy is an archetype that embodies youth and naïve creation.). With the start of Cloud City FriendsWithYou also released a CD music album of the same name featuring music artists such as PonPoko, Phoenicia, Otto VaN Shirach, and Sam.

Cloudy is a video installation that launched exclusively on "Pharrell Williams','i am OTHER'," and the YouTube channel. "Cloudy" is a short by artists Samuel Borkson and Arturo Sandoval III. The animated piece is an exploration of the clouds; a sweet, visual soundscape that takes the viewer through a personal journey into the sky. It invites viewers to follow a cast of clouds and raindrops through an entrancing adventure. FriendsWithYou explores animism -- giving the main cast of characters a soul. The purpose of the piece is to transcend the viewer to a peaceful and joyous state. Clouds singing and performing their duties in a joyful manner show us that everything in our world has a role and a purpose.

Skywalkers Parade was commissioned by Scion and was a collaboration with other artists such as Ara Peterson, Misaki Kawai, MumbleBoy, Paper Rad, David Choe, and DEVILROBOTS. It consisted of a number of balloons sizing from 5 feet to 60 feet and premiered on December 7, 2006 during Art Basel Miami. FWY conceived the Skywalkers Parade as “a collaborative way to tell a beautiful story through an enchanted parade in the sky."

Get Lucky was an installation located in the Miami-based art space "The Box" which ran from August 28th to September 25th, 2004. It featured six different altars, with a focus on pyramid, conical, or triangular shapes, covering different aspects of human life and death. The Fur Liaison was a furry monster character who accompanied guests around the installation. The Installation aimed to be an "adventure into a modern ritual that empowers us to realize the significant effect we can pose on the world and a chance to alter it to a more balanced state to achieve happiness." It also was featured at the Merry Karnowsky Gallery in Los Angeles November 20, 2004 from January 15, 2005.

Other installations include: Sweet Dreams at the de la Cruz Collection in Wynwood, Florida from October 21 to October 23, 2011; Wish Come True at Soovac, in Minneapolis, Minnesota from September 28 to October 27, 2007; We Are Friends at the Walker Art Center in Minneapolis on September 16, 2007; and Power Pond at the Museum of Contemporary Art in North Miami from January 28, 2006, to January 20, 2008.

== True and the Rainbow Kingdom ==
FriendsWithYou's past works are the basis of True and the Rainbow Kingdom, an animated series produced by Guru Studio for Netflix. The duo (together with Pharrell Williams' I Am Other, and Home Plate Entertainment) have participated in the development and production of the series.
