= Splash Entertainment =

American animation studio

Splash Entertainment, LLC.
- Logo used since 2014
- Formerly: Mike Young Productions, Inc. (1990–2009); MoonScoop Entertainment, LLC. (2009–2014)
- Type: Private
- Industry: Animation
- Predecessors: Crest Animation Productions; MoonScoop
- Founded: March 2, 1990; 36 years ago
- Founders: Mike Young; Liz Young; Bill Schultz
- Headquarters: Los Angeles, California, U.S.
- Key people: Mike Young (co-CEO); Steve Rosen (co-CEO); Liz Young (President)
- Products: Television series Motion pictures
- Parent: MoonScoop (2005–2014)
- Subsidiaries: Kabillion; CyberSplash Entertainment (50%; 2022–2025)

Splash Entertainment, LLC. (formerly known as Mike Young Productions, Inc. and MoonScoop Entertainment, LLC.) is an American animation studio founded in 1990 by Mike Young, Liz Young and Bill Schultz that produces children's TV series. Splash also controls the streaming service Kabillion.

== History ==
=== Independent era (1990–2005) ===
The studio was originally owned and operated by three animation producers, husband and wife Mike and Liz Young, and Bill Schultz (six seasons of The Simpsons, Garfield and Friends and Bobby's World). The studio produces content in both traditional 2D and 3D computer animation.

The company launched a self-distribution unit in 2002.

On March 29, 2004, the company launched Taffy Entertainment, which would become the company's rights management and worldwide distribution subsidiary. Taffy soon launched a licensing unit in August. Taffy wasn't the same company as Mike Young Productions, both had similar instances.

=== Acquired by MoonScoop and rebranding (2005–2013) ===
In October 2005, MoonScoop acquired a 51% majority stake in both MYP and Taffy, with Mike Young (through Mike Young Productions, Inc.) retaining a 49% stake. In March 2009, MoonScoop announced that both units would be rebranded under the MoonScoop brand. with Mike Young Productions rebranding as MoonScoop Entertainment, LLC., and Taffy Entertainment being absorbed into the newly renamed company.

=== Management buyout (2013–2022) ===
MoonScoop Entertainment, LLC.'s parent company, MoonScoop, entered administration in Paris courts in July 2013, but this did not affect the operations of the US company. In November, Mike Young filed a $5 million lawsuit against MoonScoop's US holding division for a violation of contract, deeming that his business attempted to purchase out MoonScoop's stake in MoonScoop Entertainment, LLC., but wouldn't let him do so. Young also claimed that he was completely unaware of MoonScoop's financial issues until the day the news were reported.

On January 27, 2014, Dargaud, through their fully owned subsidiary Ellipsanime, purchased MoonScoop's assets, and a week later on February 3, Mike Young purchased out Ellipsanime's 51% share in MoonScoop Entertainment, LLC., and rebranded the company as Splash Entertainment, LLC.

=== Partnership with Cyber Group Studios (2022–2025) ===
On June 13, 2022, Splash Entertainment announced they would form a joint-venture with French studio Cyber Group Studios called CyberSplash Entertainment. The two companies expanded their partnership in February 2023 to include worldwide distribution rights to Splash's TV catalog. Following the bankruptcy and liquidation of Cyber Group Studios on April 28, 2025, the distribution rights to Splash Entertainment's catalog all reverted back to the company.

== Productions ==
=== Television series ===
Title	Year(s)	Network	Co-production with	Notes
Bobby's World	1990-1998	Fox Kids	Film Roman; Alevy Productions	Currently holds distribution rights
The Hot Rod Dogs and Cool Car Cats	1995–1996	ITV	Dave Edwards Studio; Scottish Television Enterprises; Rainbow Main Studio	
Star Hill Ponies	1998	BBC; S4C	Bumper Films; BBC (Series 1); BBC Worldwide (Series 1); S4C	Currently owned by Hoho Entertainment
Voltron: The Third Dimension	1998–2000	Syndication	World Events Productions	Currently owned by DreamWorks Classics
Angel Wings	1999	direct-to-video	Tyndale Entertainment; Sony Wonder Television	Owned by Studio 100
Clifford the Big Red Dog	2000–2003	PBS (PBS Kids)	Scholastic Entertainment	Animation production, produced and owned by Scholastic Entertainment
Butt-Ugly Martians	2001–2002	ITV (CITV); Nickelodeon	Just Entertainment; DCDC Limited	Currently owned by YoBoHo New Media Pvt. Ltd.
Horrible Histories	2000–2001	ITV (CITV)	Scholastic Entertainment; Telegael Teoranta	Animation production, produced and owned by Scholastic Entertainment
Funky Cops	2002–2004	M6	Antefilms Production; M6-Métropole Télévision; TPS Cinéma; Greenlight Media AG	Worldwide distribution, currently owned by Ellipsanime/Dargaud
He-Man and the Masters of the Universe	2002–2004	Cartoon Network	Mattel	Owned by Mattel
Code Lyoko	2003–2007	France 3 Canal J	Antefilms Production (Season 1); MoonScoop (Seasons 2–4)	Worldwide distribution through Taffy, currently owned by Ellipsanime/Dargaud
Clifford's Puppy Days	2003–2006	PBS (PBS Kids)	Scholastic Entertainment	Animation production for Series 1, produced and owned by Scholastic Entertainment
Jakers! The Adventures of Piggley Winks	2003–2007	PBS (PBS Kids)	Entara Ltd. Crest Communications	Entara took over distribution from Taffy in 2007
ToddWorld	2004–2008	Discovery Kids; TLC	Telegael Teoranta; DQ Entertainment	
Max and the Mechanicals	2004	PBS (PBS Kids)	JadooWorks Pvt. Ltd. Telegael Teoranta; Sony Pictures Television	Pilot
Pet Alien	2004–2007	Cartoon Network; Animania HD; Télétoon; TF1	Antefilms Production (season 1); Crest Communications (season 1); JadooWorks (season 1); Telegael Teoranta; KI.KA (season 2); Europool (season 2); MoonScoop (season 2); Télétoon (season 2)	
Bratz	2005–2008	Fox (4KidsTV)	MGA Entertainment	Owned by MGA Entertainment
Mix Master	2005–2006	KBS	Sunwoo Entertainment; Beijing Omni Culture Exchange; Nippon Animation	Non-Asian distribution rights through Taffy
Growing Up Creepie	2006–2008	Discovery Kids	Telegael Teoranta; Sunwoo Entertainment; Peach Blossom Media; DAG Entertainment	
I Got a Rocket!	2006–2007	KiKA; Nickelodeon Australia; Network Ten; Kabillion; Korean Broadcasting System	SLR Productions; MotionWorks; Europool; Peach Blossom Media; Sunwoo Entertainment	
Dive Olly Dive!	2006–2010	Animania HD; PBS Kids Sprout; KiKA	Yoram Gross-EM.TV Pty Ltd. (season 1, eps. 1–16); Flying Bark Productions (season 1, eps. 17–52, season 2); GDC International Limited; Telegael Teoranta; Atlantyca Entertainment (season 2)	
Fantastic Four: World's Greatest Heroes	2006–2007	Cartoon Network Europe	MoonScoop; Marvel Studios; Cartoon Network Europe	Distribution through Taffy
Cosmic Quantum Ray	2007–2008	Animania HD; KiKA; M6	Method Animation; Cosmotoons; Europool; Telegael Teoranta; SK C&C; Independence Creative	
Bunny Maloney	2009	Canal+ Family; France 2	MoonScoop; Telegael Teoranta; France Télévisions	Distribution through Taffy, currently owned by Ellipsanime/Dargaud
Geronimo Stilton	2009–2017	Rai 2 Rai Gulp; M6	Atlantyca Entertainment; Rai Fiction; MoonScoop	Distribution for Seasons 1–2
The Twisted Whiskers Show	2009–2010	CBBC Channel; The Hub	DQ Entertainment; CloudCo, Inc. Telegael Teoranta	
Chloe's Closet	2010–2014	PBS Kids Sprout; CITV Channel; KiKA	European Film Partners (season 1); Wales Creative IP Fund (season 1); Trickompany Filmproduktion (season 1); Kids Workout Factory (season 2); Telegael Teoranta; Minika (season 2)	
Hero: 108	2010–2012	Cartoon Network	Cartoon Network Europe; Gamania; Telegael Teoranta; Hong Ying Animation	
Tara Duncan	2010–2011	M6; Disney Channel	MoonScoop; DQ Entertainment	
Strawberry Shortcake's Berry Bitty Adventures	2010–2015	The Hub	American Greetings; AG Properties	Owned by WildBrain
Gasp!	2010–2011	ABC3; Nine Network	SLR Productions; Screen Australia; Agogo Media	Distribution only
Zevo-3	2010–2011	Nicktoons	Maslen Entertainment; Skechers Entertainment	
Super Sportlets	2010–2011	Kabillion	Kids Workout Factory; Telegael Teoranta	
The DaVincibles	2011	Rai 2	Neo Network (earlier episodes); Zodiak Active (later episodes); Rai Fiction; SLR Productions; Cartobaleno; Telegael Teoranta; Big Animation; Verve Communications; Top Draw Animation (later episodes); Agogo Media (later episodes)	
My Phone Genie	2012	CITV Channel	Talent Television; MoonScoop; ZDF; ZDF Enterprises; Telegael Teoranta	currently owned by Ellipsanime/Dargaud
Wild Grinders	2012–2015	Nicktoons	Home Plate Entertainment; Telegael Teoranta; Four Down Productions (season 1); Agogo Media (season 1); Copernicus Studios (season 1); Superjacket Productions (season 2); Top Draw Animation (season 2); Big Jump Entertainment (season 2)	Season 1 only
Care Bears: Welcome to Care-a-Lot	2012	The Hub	American Greetings; AG Properties	Owned by Cloudco Entertainment
Code Lyoko: Evolution	2013	France 4	MoonScoop; Lagardère Thématiques	Overseas Distribution, currently owned by Ellipsanime/Dargaud
Lalaloopsy	2013–2015	Nickelodeon; Nick Jr. Channel	MGA Entertainment	Owned by MGA Entertainment
Sabrina: Secrets of a Teenage Witch	2013–2014	Hub Network	Archie Comics; Telegael Teoranta; DSK Entertainment; Laughing Lion Animation	
Care Bears & Cousins	2015–2016	Netflix	American Greetings; AG Properties	Owned by Cloudco Entertainment
Kulipari	2016–2024	Netflix; Hulu	The Outlook Company; Telegael Teoranta	
We're Lalaloopsy	2017	Netflix	MGA Entertainment	Owned by MGA Entertainment
Woody Woodpecker	2018–2022	YouTube	Universal Pictures International; Universal 1440 Entertainment; Universal Animation Studios	Owned by NBCUniversal

=== Feature films and specials ===
- The Secret Garden (1994)
- Mama, Do You Love Me (1999)
- Quest for Zhu (2011)
- Bratz:
  - Bratz: Rock Angelz (2005)
  - Bratz Genie Magic (2006)
  - Bratz: Passion 4 Fashion Diamondz (2006)
  - Bratz Fashion Pixiez (2007)
  - Bratz Kidz Sleep-Over Adventure (2007)
  - Bratz Super Babyz (2007)
  - Bratz Kidz Fairy Tales (2008)
  - Bratz: Girlz Really Rock (2008)
  - Bratz: Pampered Petz (2010) (Note: Released internationally in 2009)
  - Bratz: Desert Jewelz (2012) (Note: Released internationally in 2009)
  - Bratz Babyz Save Christmas (2013) (Note: Released internationally in 2008)
- Dive Olly Dive:
  - Dive Olly Dive and the Pirate Treasure
  - Dive Olly Dive and the Octopus Rescue
  - Dive Olly Dive: A Hero's Magical Quest
  - Dive Olly Dive: Deep Sea Adventure
  - Dive Olly Dive: Alien Encounter
- Journey to GloE
- The Life & Adventures of Santa Claus (2000)
- Michael Jackson's Halloween (TV special; 2017)
- Norm of the North:
  - Norm of the North (theatrical feature; 2016)
  - Norm of the North: Keys to the Kingdom (2019)
  - Norm of the North: King Sized Adventure (2019)
  - Norm of the North: Family Vacation (2020)
- P. J. Sparkles (1992)
- Polly Pocket: Lunar Eclipse (2004)
- Mariah Carey's All I Want for Christmas Is You (2017)
- Alpha and Omega: Dino Digs (2016)
- Alpha and Omega: The Big Fureeze (2016)
- Alpha and Omega: Journey to Bear Kingdom (2017)
- Rock Dog 2: Rock Around the Park (2021)
- Rock Dog 3: Battle the Beat (2023)

== Awards ==
- Distributor of the Year for 2007 (nominated for a second year in 2008)
