= Awesome Magical Tales =

2012–2013 TV series

- Promotional poster for first season
- Also known as: Teenage Fairytale Dropouts
- Genre: Comedy
- Created by: Adolfo Martinez Vara; José C. Garcia de Letona
- Based on: Magos y Gigantes by Ánima Estudios
- Developed by: Bill Schultz; Rita Street; Andrés Couturier
- Creative director: Jo Boag
- Voices of: Katherine Cohn Beck; Simon Kennedy; John Hasler; Emma Tate; Nigel Pilkington; Dan Russell
- Theme music composer: Jaco Caraco; Bill Schultz; Todd Schultz
- Composer: John McPhillips
- Countries of origin: Mexico; Australia; Ireland; United States; Canada; Hong Kong
- Original languages: English; Spanish
- No. of seasons: 1
- No. of episodes: 26 (52 segments)

Production
- Executive producers: Fernando de Fuentes; José C. García de Letona; Suzanne Ryan; Paul Cummins; Bill Schultz; Rita Street; Steven Ching (Note: For Agogo Media)
- Producers: Fernando de Fuentes; José C. García de Letona; Suzanne Ryan; Siobhán Ní Ghadhra; Yasmin Jones; Louisa Ma
- Animator: Agogo Media
- Running time: 22 minutes
- Production companies: Ánima Estudios; SLR Productions; Home Plate Entertainment; Telegael; CCI Entertainment

Original release
- Network: 7two
- Release: 31 December 2012 – 23 December 2013

Awesome Magical Tales (also known as Teenage Fairytale Dropouts) is an animated series created by Adolfo Martinez Vara and José C. Garcia de Letona. Inspired by the characters from the 2003 Mexican animated film, Magos y Gigantes, the series was created and produced by Ánima Estudios and co-produced with SLR Productions, Home Plate Entertainment and Telegael. It made its first introduction on Seven Network in Australia on 31 December 2012. In Mexico, the show premiered on digital and streaming platforms, dubbed as Generación Fairytale.

The show later premiered in the U.S. on the Hub Network on 31 May 2014.

Ánima Estudios has launched an official YouTube channel for the Spanish-language version of the show on 7 May 2015, with an English-language version being launched a week later on 14 May 2015.

The show has been recently acquired by Bejuba! Entertainment for new distribution rights and was renamed Awesome Magical Tales. The show was also renewed for a second season by Australia's ABC Me after successful ratings during its domestic broadcast.

== Synopsis ==
Set in a fairy tale-like setting, three friends, Jeremiah, the son of the giant in Jack and the Beanstalk, Trafalgar, the nephew of Merlin the Wizard, a wingless fairy named Fury, the daughter of Tooth Fairy, live through a tough life as teenagers and are determined to be themselves, despite their parents' whim and their fairy tale origins.

== Cast ==
=== Main cast ===
- Simon Kennedy as Jeremiah, the son of the Giant from 'Jack and the Beanstalk', who ironically isn't a giant.
- John Hasler as Trafalgar, the nephew of Merlin the Wizard, who is inept at casting spells.
- Katherine Cohn Beck as Fury, the wingless daughter of Tooth Fairy.
- Nigel Pilkington as Jimmy Rella, Evil Earl, Chuck Charming
- Dan Russell as Magic Mirror, Merlin, Pinocchio, Jr.
- Emma Tate as Mother Goose, Fairy Godmother, Melody

=== Guest stars ===
- Melissa Rauch as Miss Fiendish

== Production ==
On 28 September 2011, Ánima Estudios announced an international partnership with SLR Productions, Home Plate Entertainment and Telegael Teoranta, and green-lighted the show. "We’re thrilled to have such extraordinary partners on board for this series. I think what has really brought us together is a love for our quirky main characters," said Jose Carlos Garcia de Letona, Ánima Estudios’ executive VP. "Aussie kids will connect with the series – it is fun and quirky. It is a fresh spin on timeless classic characters.", said Suzanne Ryan, CEO of SLR Productions. "The series has been very well received by broadcasters. There is always a strong market for animated character comedies like Teenage Fairytale Dropouts with recognizable iconic themes. This is a strong collaboration among extremely creative co-production partners and the commitment to quality is apparent.", said Bill Schultz, Executive Producer and CEO at Home Plate Entertainment. According to Fernando de Fuentes, the series' producer, he stated that while the series originated in Mexico, it is designed for an English-language audience.

This show is based on the character profiles from Ánima Estudios' first film, Wizards and Giants, according to series' creator José C. García de Letona. "History comes, somehow, [from] our first movie, Wizards and Giants, but already very distantly," he said. "It follows some of the references and character profiles, but some things change radically." He also said that 70% of the show's production is taken place in Mexico, while the rest is taken place in other countries.

On 7 April 2013, Canadian entertainment company CCI Entertainment acquired distribution rights to the series and landed new sales on 9 December 2013.

On 16 October 2017, Bejuba! Entertainment has acquired new distribution rights to the series, being renamed as Awesome Magical Tales. The show has also been renewed by ABC Me for a new season. However, the second season is currently in development hell.

=== U.S. broadcasting ===
On 28 April 2014, the Hub Network acquired the U.S. rights to the show and was broadcast on 31 May 2014. This marked a milestone for the Mexican animation industry, as the first time a major U.S. cable network transmitted a Latin American-produced animated television production for its line-up, as the series was primarily produced in Mexico. According to the Ánima Estudios executives, it nearly took nearly two years for the show to enter the U.S. market. This also marked history for the studio, as this was the first time they entered a major U.S. market. After Hub's relaunching as Discovery Family, the show has been pulled from its air lineup.

== Reception ==
The show has received favorable reviews. Emily Ashby of Common Sense Media gave the show 4 out of 5 stars and wrote, "Teenage Fairytale Dropouts delivers some really admirable messages through three teen characters who are floundering their way through growing up. Sure, it has fun with the fact that Fury's still waiting to "develop" her wings and Jeremiah's small stature is almost comical given his genetic giantism, but the ultimately none of these issues puts a dent in the teens' solid self-esteem. What's more, while each story puts the characters in a rebellious situation of some kind (borrowing the family's golden goose without permission or misusing magic, for instance), there's always an obvious consequence and some positive lesson to be learned from the experience."

== Episodes ==
1. Nice Giants Finish Last / Winged Fury
2. Triple Double Trouble / Mascot Madness
3. Good Fairy of the Year / Mis-Spelled Rat
4. Grimm Gossips / Once Upon a Stompapalootza
5. All Booked Up / Abraca-Dad-Bra
6. Rebel Without a Lederhosen / Something Wicked This Way Substitutes
7. Who's the Best Actress of Them All? / Here Today, Wand Tomorrow
8. Pie Way or the Highway / Substitute Tooth Fairy
9. It's No Lie / How to Restrain Your Dragon
10. Lunch Table of the Misfit Fairytales / Lack of Hocus Pocus
11. A Giant Sized Ego / Only Slime Will Tell
12. Golden Goose Chase / Camp Stomp-a-Lot
13. My Cousin Myron / Not So Adorabella
14. Ye Olde Face Scroll Blues / A String of Promises
15. Splank’d / A Rotten Job
16. Court Ordered Magician / A Very Big Wish
17. Keeping Up With the Arthurians / Disenchanted Forest
18. The Boy Who Cried Ogre / Joust in Time
19. Bad Conrad / Fairytale Estates’ Got Talent
20. Happily Ever After Day / Unhappy Birthdays
21. Giant Competition / Jack and the Beanstalks
22. Ca-Stache-Trophy / Sayer It Ain’t So
23. A Nose For Trouble / A Brand New Happy Ending
24. The Tell Tale Report Card / Party On
25. Pet Project / Get to the Point
26. Just the Three of Us / A Grimm Story

== Broadcast ==
Teenage Fairytale Dropouts is broadcast on Seven Network, ABC1, and ABC Me in Australia, HBO Asia and HBO Family Asia in Singapore, Sun Network in India, and Discovery Family (formerly Hub Network) in the U.S.

In Mexico, it was released exclusively on digital platforms, such as Amazon Prime Video.
