= SLR Productions =

Australian animation studio

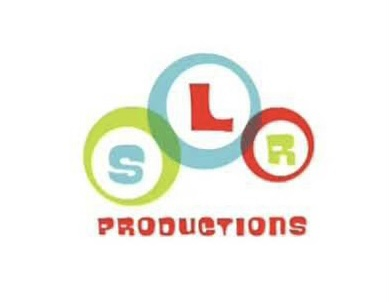
- Logo used since 2008
- Type: Subsidiary
- Industry: Entertainment
- Founded: November 24, 2000; 25 years ago
- Founder: Suzanne Ryan
- Headquarters: Sydney, Australia
- Key people: Suzanne Ryan (CEO); Yasmin Jones (head of production); Helen Thwaites (business affairs); Dean Sutherland (creative producer)
- Products: Motion pictures; TV programs
- Parent: South Pacific Pictures
- Website: slrproductions.com

SLR Productions is an Australian company, specializing in the development and production of children's content. It was established in 2000 by founder and CEO, Suzanne Ryan.

NZ based company South Pacific Pictures bought out Ryans's stake in the company and joint ventured to produce animated shows aimed at international markets. SLR Productions has produced more than 180 hours of content sold in more than 165 countries throughout the world.

== Credits ==
=== Animation ===
- Deadly (2006) (co-production with Yoram Gross-EM.TV)
- I Got a Rocket! (2006–2007) (co-production with Mike Young Productions, MotionWorks, Europool, Peach Blossom Media and Sunwoo Entertainment)
- Dex Hamilton: Alien Entomologist (2008–2009) (co-production with March Entertainment)
- Gasp! (2010–2011) (co-production with Screen Australia, Agogo Media and MoonScoop)
- The DaVincibles (2011) (co-production with Zodiak Active, Rai Fiction, MoonScoop and Telegael)
- Guess How Much I Love You (2011–2017) (co-production with Hessischer Rundfunk, Kika and Scrawl Studios)
- Teenage Fairytale Dropouts (2012–2013) (co-production with Ánima Estudios, Home Plate Entertainment, Telegael and CCI Entertainment)
- The Skinner Boys: Guardians of the Lost Secrets (2014–2017) (co-production with Telegael, ZDF Enterprises, Home Plate Entertainment and Top Draw Animation)
- Captain Flinn and the Pirate Dinosaurs (2015–2016) (co-production with Telegael, ZDF Enterprises and Top Draw Animation)
- Lexi & Lottie: Trusty Twin Detectives (2016–2017) (co-production with Telegael, ZDF Enterprises and Network Ten)
- Alice-Miranda Friends Forever (2019) (co-production with Screen Australia and ZDF Enterprises)
- Berry Bees (2019–2020) (co-production with Atlantyca Entertainment, Telegael and Cosmos-Maya Production)
- Space Nova (2021) (co-production with Giggle Garage and ZDF Enterprises)
- Alice-Miranda: A Royal Christmas Ball (2021) (co-production with Screen Australia and ZDF Enterprises)

=== Live-action ===
- Sam Fox: Extreme Adventures (2014–2015) (co-production with ZDF Enterprises and Network Ten)

=== Other projects ===
- Mortein Rat Kill Throwpacks commercial (2005)
- Just Being Eve (2006) (co-production with South Pacific Pictures) - a cancelled animated-live action spin-off of the 2001 New Zealand TV series Being Eve

== Sammy D. ==
Sammy D. is the studio's mascot, a real Borderdoodle dog who joined SLR as the office mascot in 2009 and who frequents the SLR office. Sammy appeared in the SLR's animated company's logo which was first shown in Gasp!, and since appeared in every SLR show since 2010. Sammy provided his own barks for the logo.

== Awards ==
SLR Productions has been involved in SPAA (Screen Producers Association of Australia) since 2004.

SLR Productions have won awards in 22 countries from 2006 to 2020 including a Daytime EMMY, Australian Export Award, AACTA Award Nomination, ADG Awards, Writers Guild Nominee, Pixie, Grand Prix Golden Kuker, Pulcinella Nominee, ACG, Rockie nominee, ATOM Award and many others, both for programs and for business.

Countries of awards and nominations include: Lebanon, South Korea, France, Netherlands, Australia, Bulgaria, Austria, Italy, United States, Singapore, Japan, Canada, Germany, China, Brazil, Belgium, Iran, Russia, Greece, Armenia, Malaysia and Ireland.

== See also ==
- List of film production companies
- List of television production companies
