= Halifax: Retribution =

Australian television series

- Genre: Crime drama Psychological thriller Mystery thriller Crime thriller Psychological drama Police procedural
- Created by: Roger Simpson
- Written by: Roger Simpson
- Directed by: Fiona Banks; Mark Joffe; Daniel Nettheim; Peter Salmon
- Starring: Rebecca Gibney; Anthony LaPaglia; Claudia Karvan
- Composer: Cezary Skubiszewski
- Country of origin: Australia
- Original language: English
- No. of episodes: 7

Production
- Executive producers: Mikael Borglund; Rebecca Gibney; Andy Ryan; Jo Rooney
- Producers: Roger Simpson; Louisa Kors
- Cinematography: Geoff Hall
- Editors: Stephen Evans; Ben Joss
- Running time: 48 minutes
- Production company: Beyond Lonehand

Original release
- Network: Nine Network
- Release: 25 August –: 6 October 2020

Halifax: Retribution is a continuation sequel to the original Halifax f.p. series (1994–2002) which premiered on 25 August 2020 on the Nine Network in Australia. Rebecca Gibney returns as Doctor Jane Halifax who, after years as a university professor, is brought back into the forensic psychiatrist field to help the police task force find a new serial killer. The series is again set in Melbourne.

== Production ==
In November 2018, Nine announced it would be reviving the series, set to air in 2020, titled Halifax: Retribution, with Roger Simpson returning as writer and producer, alongside executive producer Mikael Borglund and writers Mac Gudgeon and Jan Sardi. It would be produced by Beyond Lonehand, a joint venture between Simpson and Beyond Productions.

In July 2019, it was announced that Anthony LaPaglia and Jessica Marais would be joining the series, along with Jacqueline McKenzie, Rick Donald, Hannah Monson, Craig Hall, Mavournee Hazel and Louisa Mignone.

In September 2019, Marais dropped out of the series due to her work schedule and personal commitments. Claudia Karvan was a late addition to the cast list; she was known to the directors and had worked onscreen with Gibney in the telemovie, Small Claims (2004), and its two sequels. The first promo for the series premiered in April 2020, along with announcement of more cast members.

== Cast ==
- Rebecca Gibney as Professor/Dr.Jane Halifax
- Anthony LaPaglia as Tom Saracen, the head of Taskforce Stingray
- Claudia Karvan as Mandy Petras, Ben's long-lost and mysterious ex-wife, and biological mother of Zoe; who quickly becomes Jane's adversary
- Craig Hall as Ben Sailor, Jane's husband
- Mavournee Hazel as Zoe Sailor, Jane's stepdaughter
- Ben O'Toole as Daniel/Jarrod Bungert, the serial killer sniper terrorizing Melbourne
- Ming-Zhu Hii as Mila Bronski, member of Taskforce Stingray
- Rick Donald as Nick Tanner, member of Taskforce Stingray
- Michala Banas as Erin Riley, member of Taskforce Stingray
- Mark Coles Smith as Kip Lee, member of Taskforce Stingray
- Jacqueline McKenzie as Sharon Sinclair, (1 episode; returning from Halifax f.p.)
- John Waters as Ryan (1 episode)
- Mandy McElhinney as Police Minister Nolan (2 episodes)
- Anna Samson as Smithy, an undercover cop infiltrating a far-right extremist group (1 episode)
- Ben Nicholas as Truck Driver (1 episode)
- Brett Swain as Security Guy (1 episode)
- Jane Hall as News Anchor (1 episode)
- Justin Rosniak as Anton Bungert, Jarrod's brother (2 episodes)
- Laura Gordon as Toni (1 episode)
- Luke Ford as Neil (1 episode)
- Paul Goddard as Newsreader (2 episodes)

== Episodes ==
No. overall	No. in series	Episode	Directed by	Written by	Original release date	Aus. viewers
22	1	"Episode 1"	Mark Joffe	Roger Simpson	25 August 2020	544,000 469,000
For the past 20 years, Jane Halifax has enjoyed a life as a university professor, been in a stable and loving long-term relationship with her musician partner Ben, and a loving stepmother to his daughter Zoe. However, the case of a serial killer who is terrorising Melbourne lures her back to the job she left behind as the case suddenly gets very personal.
23	2	"Episode 2"	Fiona Banks	Jane Allen	1 September 2020	479,000
As the shooter claims two more victims, Jane Halifax suspects a killer from her past is responsible for her husband's murder.
24	3	"Episode 3"	Fiona Banks	Stuart Page	8 September 2020	505,000
The Task Force infiltrates a group of far-right extremists over the ongoing sniper attacks. Jane is suspicious of Mandy's growing involvement in Zoe's life.
25	4	"Episode 4"	Peter Salmon	Jane Allen	15 September 2020	508,000
Jane makes contact with Task Force's prime suspect, as the Task Force discovers a vital clue linking Ben's murder to the serial killer.
26	5	"Episode 5"	Peter Salmon	Stuart Page	22 September 2020	517,000
The Sniper's campaign of terror escalates when he targets the Police Minister and delivers an ultimatum to the entire city; Jane's investigation into Ben's murder takes an unexpected turn.
27	6	"Episode 6"	Daniel Nettheim	Chris Corbett	29 September 2020	496,000
Jane discovers the true identity of the serial killer terrorising the city. Task Force boss Tom Saracen is critically injured in an ambush.
28	7	"Episode 7"	Daniel Nettheim	Chris Corbett	6 October 2020	577,000
Jane Halifax confronts the shooter as he prepares for an attack on the entire city; Mandy confesses to the shocking truth behind Ben's killing.

== Ratings ==
No.	Title	Air date	Overnight ratings		Consolidated ratings		Total viewers	Ref(s)
No.	Title	Air date	Viewers	Rank	Viewers	Rank	Total viewers	Ref(s)
1	"Episode 1"	25 August 2020	544,000 469,000	15 17	106,000 127,000	13 14	650,000 596,000	
2	"Episode 2"	1 September 2020	479,000	17	184,000	12	663,000	
3	"Episode 3"	8 September 2020	505,000	16	169,000	10	674,000	
4	"Episode 4"	15 September 2020	508,000	14	148,000	10	656,000	
5	"Episode 5"	22 September 2020	517,000	13	171,000	10	688,000	
6	"Episode 6"	29 September 2020	496,000	13	181,000	10	677,000	
7	"Episode 7"	6 October 2020	577,000	9	143,000	7	720,000	
