= CCI Entertainment =

Canadian television production company

CCI Entertainment Ltd.
- Type: Private
- Industry: Entertainment
- Predecessor: Cambium Entertainment; Catalyst Entertainment
- Founded: February 13, 2002; 24 years ago
- Founder: Kristine Klohk; Arnie Zipursky
- Headquarters: Toronto, Ontario, Canada
- Area served: Worldwide
- Divisions: CCI Releasing
- Website: www.ccientertainment.com

CCI Entertainment Ltd. (Cambium Catalyst International) is a Canadian television production company that focuses on the production of television shows and feature-length films. The company was formed in February 2002 as a merger between Cambium Entertainment and Catalyst Entertainment.

== History ==
CCI Entertainment was formed on February 13, 2002, after Canadian media companies Cambium Entertainment and Catalyst Entertainment merged. CCI inherited Catalyst's alliance and partnership with Gullane Entertainment (previously known as The Britt Allcroft Company) that began in 1994, with the company holding a 32% non-voting, 19% voting interest in the newly enlarged business, and would continue to operate as Gullane's Canadian affiliate and first-look distributor for any CCI programme or film. It also allowed the expansion of Gullane's international catalogue to include Cambium's programmes. After Gullane announced to be purchased by HIT Entertainment in July 2002, however, the future relationship between the two companies remained uncertain. After the deal closed in October, CCI spent a few months under HIT until the company announced the end of their partnership with them in April 2003, purchasing out HIT's shares and half of Gullane's inherited catalogue, which were placed under the company's new distribution arm CCI Releasing.

In 2007, CCI began preparations to open up an office in Los Angeles, California.

In July 2012, the company acquired worldwide distribution rights to six films from Leader Film Company's catalogue.

In April 2013, CCI agreed with 9 Story Entertainment to handle the marketing and distribution of CCI Kids' library and acquire the underlying rights to all of CCI's family and children's programmes. The deal also allowed for 9 Story to enter into a first-look distribution deal for any new children's or family production produced by CCI. The deal was closed three months later on July 24.

In March 2014, CCI entered into a distribution partnership with MarVista Entertainment to handle co-distribution rights to CCI's catalogue. CCI changed their international distributor to the Fremantle Corporation in February 2015.

== Programming ==
=== Shows ===
- Panasia (2003, co-production with UTV Software Communications)
- Stylin' Gypsies (2008)
- Cubicle to the Cage (2013)
- Real Houses Of... (2016)

=== Documentaries ===
- 7 Days Of Remembrance… And Hope (2009)
- Paws for Autism (2012)

=== CCI Kids ===
- Monster by Mistake (1999–2003, Series 3 only)
- Timeblazers (2003–2005, co-production with Coneybeare Stories)
- Harry and His Bucket Full of Dinosaurs (2005–2008, co-production with Collingwood O'Hare Entertainment Limited and Silver Fox Films)
- Ghost Trackers (2005–2009)
- Erky Perky (2006–2009, co-production with Ambience Entertainment and The LaB Sydney)
- Meteor and the Mighty Monster Trucks (2006–2008, co-production with Bigfoot, Inc., RC2 Corporation, Big Bang Digital Studios, Endgame Entertainment, and Brandissimo Inc.)
- Dinosapien (2007, co-production with BBC Worldwide)
- Frankenstein's Cat (2007–2008, co-production with MacKinnon & Saunders and Kayenta Productions)
- Turbo Dogs (2008, co-production with Smiley Guy Studios, Huhu Studios and Scholastic Entertainment)
- Artzooka! (2010–2012, co-production with MotionWorks GmbH (Season 1)
- Guess How Much I Love You (2011–2012, Series 1, distribution only)
- Joe & Jack (2012, co-production with Dancing Girl Productions)
- Teenage Fairytale Dropouts (2012–2013), co-production with Ánima Estudios, SLR Productions, Home Plate Entertainment and Telegael.

=== Television films ===
- Fast Food High (2003, co-production with Accent Entertainment)
- My Opposition: The Diaries of Friedrich Kellner (2007)
- Iron Road (2007, co-production with Alchemy Television and China Film House)
- The Connor Rourke Chronicles: The Myth of Gaia (2009)
- The Connor Rourke Chronicles: The Spear of Destiny (2009)
- No Mountain Too High
- Cracked (co-production with Mirkin Creative)
- Anything But Christmas (2012, co-production with Really Real Films)
- The Ride
- Row Your Boat

=== Theatrical Films ===
- Sled Dogs (2016, distributed by Search Engine Films)
- Undercover Grandpa (2017, co-production with Corus Entertainment, distributed by Elevation Pictures)
- Another Kind of Wedding (2017, co-production with Banner Films, Vroom Productions and Alley Lime Productions)
