= True and the Rainbow Kingdom =

Television series

- Genre: Fantasy; Action; Adventure
- Created by: Jeff Borkin; Samuel Borkson; Arturo Sandoval III; Bill Schultz
- Based on: Artworks by FriendsWithYou (Samuel Borkson and Arturo Sandoval III)
- Developed by: Mary Bredin; Frank Falcone
- Directed by: Mark Thornton & Todd Kauffman; Harold Harris; Jamie Whitney
- Creative directors: Brandon James Scott (design); Yurie Rocha (production)
- Voices of: Michela Luci; Jamie Watson; Eric Peterson; Anna Bartlam; Dante Zee; Nicolas Aqui
- Music by: Lorenzo Castelli; Joe Coupal; For Eggplant: Steve D'Angelo; Terry Tompkins
- Opening theme: "She's True!"
- Countries of origin: Canada; United States
- Original language: English
- No. of seasons: 3 (including 2 standalone series)
- No. of episodes: 29 (including 10 additional episodes)

Production
- Executive producers: Mary Bredin; Frank Falcone; Robin Frank; Jeremy Larner; Bill Schultz; Pharrell Williams; For Netflix: Dominique Bazay
- Producers: Erin Mackie; Jiro C. Okada
- Editors: Tom Berger; Kelly Carlson; Rajo Zakic
- Running time: 22 minutes
- Production companies: Home Plate Entertainment; Guru Studio

Original release
- Network: Netflix (Worldwide); CBC Television (Canada)
- Release: August 11, 2017 – September 26, 2019

True and the Rainbow Kingdom is an animated children's television series produced by Home Plate Entertainment and Guru Studio in collaboration with American artist duo FriendsWithYou and Pharrell Williams' I Am Other. Based on the artwork by FriendsWithYou, it aired on CBC Television in Canada and streamed exclusively on Netflix everywhere else.

The 10-episode first season of the series was released on Netflix on August 11, 2017, which led to Season 2, which was composed of two five-episode standalone titles, titled True: Magical Friends and True: Wonderful Wishes, both of which debuted on June 15, 2018. The series was renewed for a 4-episode third season of the series, titled Mushroom Town, which was released on Netflix on May 3, 2019. True Tunes was released on July 12 on Netflix, with 8 new tracks. The series finale, titled Wild Wild Yetis, was released on August 30, 2019.

== Plot ==
True and the Rainbow Kingdom follows True and her best friend Bartleby the Cat, as they help the whimsical citizens of the Rainbow Kingdom, a wondrous, colorful universe filled with delightful and fantastical citizens. True is the only one with the ability to activate the magical powers of The Wishes of the Wishing Tree, solve problems in the Rainbow Kingdom, and empower viewers with her imagination, mindfulness, and empathy.

== Development and production ==
The series was originally announced in March 2013. Titled Wish Come True at that time after the eponymous designer toys by FriendsWithYou, it was planned to have 10 half-hour episodes in a season, as produced by Home Plate Entertainment.

In June 2015, TVO has announced 5 new titles for their line-up of preschool series. Among them was True and the Rainbow Kingdom, and this time, it was announced to have ten 22-24-minute episodes in a season and slated to be released in 2017. In the announcement, Pharrell Williams' I Am Other was also included in the list of companies.

== Characters ==
=== Main characters ===
- True (voiced by Michela Luci) is a strong heroine who possesses a warm heart, a clever mind and boundless energy. She accepts every challenge head-on with a beaming smile; what makes True "truly" extraordinary is that she is the only one in the Rainbow Kingdom to activate the Wishes’ special powers that unleash magical energy. She is eight years old at the beginning of the series.
- Bartleby (Voiced by Jamie Watson) is True's funny black cat sidekick with a lot of bravado and the gift of gab. However, only his best friend True knows he is actually a bit of a scaredy-cat. As replied by True, he is an opinionated cat and provides a lot of commentary, which helps trigger True's creative problem-solving skills.
- Rainbow King (voiced by Eric Peterson) is the lovable ruler of the Rainbow Kingdom. He is a kind, sympathetic and humble king. Though he possesses a wealth of knowledge, he shares his wisdom in riddles by adding fun complexity to True's adventures. He does anything to help True on her journey, but he knows that "true" success is achieved when True solves all of the problems with him.
- Zee (Voiced by Dante Zee and Nicolas Aqui) is True's buddy, an apprentice to the Rainbow King, and the wish keeper. He is one or two years older than True. Being a trained Wishologist, he takes care of the Wishes and knows all about their strengths and powers. Meanwhile, when a problem arises in the kingdom, True seeks out Zee's advice and wish help in the Wishing Tree.
- Grizelda (voiced by Anna Bartlam) is a self-centered young princess. Deep down, she realizes she needs a friend like True. Although True tries to reach out to the Princess, Grizelda's self-absorbed ways can make that challenging; however, love in the Rainbow Kingdom is unconditional, so True never stops trying. The best reason for Grizelda is that someone who is a little selfish means she needs a little more love, for some reason.
- Frookie (voiced by Frank Welker) is a dog and Grizelda's sidekick. He looks out for the difficult princess because he knows the inner Grizelda is not so bad.
- The Wishes are various non-verbal but highly expressive wishes which communicate with goofy gestures and sweet sounds. Each one has a unique, big personality that complements or contrasts their power. The Wishes share a special bond with True but until they are called to action, they stay busy training with Zee. Each Wish is imbued with a special power that only True can "spark".

=== Other characters ===
- Yetis are creatures that live in The Rainbow Kingdom and communicate in "Yeti-ish". There is, however, one word known to all Yetis that they'll greet you with accompanied by a big wave, which is a loud and friendly "hi" to everyone in the Rainbow Kingdom country.
- Urg and Snick is a Yeti couple who live in Yeti Village located in The Never Ending Forest. The only couple to speak “Yeti-ish” (aside from the Rainbow King), True is usually a translator for their Yeti friends.
- Grock, Yerk and Floof are Urg and Snick's baby Yeti triplets. Grock and Yerk are girls and Floof is a boy. They are close friends to True and Bartelby.

=== Rainbow citizens ===
- The Grizmos are Grizelda’s sidekicks who act as her servants and live in a cave beneath her castle.
- Cumulo is a cumulus cloud whom True and Bartleby ride on to get around the Rainbow Kingdom.
- Glummy Glooma is the Rainbow King's gloomy cousin who prefers everything be gloomy, whether anyone likes it or not. He also acts as the Grand Marshal of Grabbleapple Fest, as it is his yearly duty to bring the grey clouds of Autumn and change the seasons.
- Little Helpers are little four-armed critters found all around The Rainbow Kingdom, keeping it running with their helpful duties.
- Mila is a little girl who is a citizen of Rainbow City. She has a giant pet stink critter named "Stinko", no longer stinky thanks to True, Bartleby, and the wishes. She is also friends with Rocky the Rock Critter.
- Rocky is a Rock Critter who befriends Mila and The Rainbow King, in addition to True and Bartleby. However, True is the only character not to speak "Rock-ish".
- Bingo Bango is a boombox shaped DJ which is a bit shy and soft-spoken. It rocks the house of any party with his music.
- The Wishing Tree is a very important tree standing atop the Rainbow Castle where Zee, the Wish Keeper/Wishologist studies the Wishes that live there. Wee wishes are brought to the tree by the Rainbow King who collects them from Wishing Heart Hollow in the Never Ending Forest. True and Bartleby go here to ask Zee for advice to solve a problem with the help of Wishes.
- Shadow and Silverclaw are masters of The Kittynati, an ancient tribe of cat ninjas. After being invited to train with the duo at The Black Tabby Dojo, Bartleby eventually trades in his Yellow Tabby Belt for his Red Tabby Belt, making him a true Ninja Cat and Kittynati.

== Episodes ==
Season	Episodes	Originally released	
Season	Episodes	First released	Last released
1	10	August 11, 2017	January 26, 2018
2	10	June 2, 2018	January 25, 2019
3	9	May 3, 2019	September 26, 2019

=== Season 1 (2017) ===
The first season of the series, entitled The Rainbow Kingdom, was released on Netflix on August 11, 2017.

No. overall	No. in season	Title	Written by	Original release date
1	1	"Super Duper Dance Party"	John Slama	August 11, 2017
True and Bartleby team up to get a dejected DJ back in the groove after Grizelda shakes his confidence on the day of the Rainbow King's dance party. Bingo Bango is a little more impatient with Grizelda and he does not like Grizelda doubting him in the grand hall in her castle.
2	2	"Frookie Sitting"	Doug Sinclair	August 11, 2017
True and Bartleby get more than they bargained for when they agree to castle-sit for the Rainbow King and watch Frookie while Grizelda's away.
3	3	"Zappy Cling!"	John Slama	August 18, 2017
After mishandling Zee's powerful Zingy Zapper, an increasingly bulky Bartleby can't seem to stop objects from sticking to him.
4	4	"Zip Zap Zooooom!"	Tom K. Mason	August 25, 2017
Grizelda is determined to win the kingdom's first Great Rainbow Rally, but her self-centred driving throws the rest of the racers off course.
5	5	"A Royal Stink"	Doug Sinclair	September 22, 2017
It's up to True to rid the kingdom of a horrible smell when the Rainbow King goes away on family business and makes her Queen for a Day.
6	6	"Great Grizmos!"	MCM & Craig Young	September 29, 2017
Following Grizelda's orders, the Grizmos build the most dazzling tower in the kingdom, but due to so many crystals, her castle starts to sink.
7	7	"Wishing Heart Hollow"	Dave Dias	October 6, 2017
The Rainbow King needs True's help with a situation involving water and giant plants but his Face Bubble message keeps breaking up.
8	8	"The Kittynati"	Diana Moore	January 12, 2018
Led by a message mouse, Bartleby goes to the Black Tabby Dojo for ninja training so that he can earn his Red Tabby Belt.
9	9	"Little Helpers"	Carolyn Hay	January 19, 2018
The little helpers are so busy doing small jobs for everyone that some of the big tasks are falling between the cracks.
10	10	"A Berry Big Mystery"	Diana Moore	January 26, 2018
Someone has been snatching up all the nummie berries in the Rainbow Valley so True and Bartleby search for the culprit.

=== Season 2 (2018) ===
The second season of True and the Rainbow Kingdom, entitled True: Magical Friends and True: Wonderful Wishes, was released as a standalone series on Netflix on June 18.

No. overall	No. in season	Title	Written by	Original release date
True: Magical Friends
11	1	"Princess Grizbot"	Doug Sinclair	June 15, 2018
Grizelda's Grizmos build her a giant robot so she can keep the people of Rainbow Kingdom safe, but she's doing it for all the wrong reasons.
12	2	"Hino Tari Hullabaloo"	Tom K. Mason	June 15, 2018
Big problems arise when a too-busy True offers to watch a valuable egg for the Rainbow King, then puts Bartleby in charge of baby-sitting.
13	3	"Queens of the Day and Night"	Amy Benham	June 22, 2018
The Rainbow Kingdom comes to a standstill when the Day Queen and the Night Queen decide to stick the sun and moon together.
14	4	"True Switcheroo"	Doug Sinclair	June 29, 2018
After digging up a powerful crystal that smells like peppermint, True and Bartleby switch places and get trapped inside each other's bodies.
15	5	"Fee Fi Fo Frookie"	MCM & Craig Young	July 6, 2018
When Frookie and Bartleby get stuck inside a troll's twisty maze, True and Grizelda must work together to rescue them.
True: Wonderful Wishes
16	6	"The Living Sea"	John Slama	November 9, 2018
A day at the beach goes awry when sea blubbs begin beaching themselves due to the warming sea water, prompting True and Bartleby to investigate.
17	7	"Cosmic Sneeze"	MCM & Craig Young	November 16, 2018
Whenever the Rainbow King sneezes, everything in the kingdom changes colour. True and Bartleby must go on an epic journey to find the cure.
18	8	"Woo-Woo Sky Blubbs"	MCM & Craig Young	January 11, 2019
True helps Bartleby overcome his anxiety about sky blubbs as they help guide the family of the flying creatures back to their distant home in the chilly north.
19	9	"Wish Gone Wild"	Tom K. Mason	January 18, 2019
The kingdom is in danger of being completely erased when a fledgling Wish named Goway gets loose before he has learned to control his powers.
20	10	"Big Mossy Mess"	Jamie Whitney	January 25, 2019
When Bartleby brings home some special Zazoony Moss, it suddenly starts to grow like crazy, and it's up to True to stop its spread before the moss covers the entire Rainbow Kingdom.

=== Season 3 (2019) ===
The third season of True and the Rainbow Kingdom, entitled Mushroom Town and Wild Wild Yetis, was released on Netflix on May 3 and September 26, 2019.

No. overall	No. in season	Title	Written by	Original release date
Mushroom Town
21	1	"Where's Cumulo?"	Heather Jackson	May 3, 2019
True didn't want to hurt Cumulo's feelings, but now the small cloud is hidden, and it's nowhere to be found when the Rainbow Kingdom needs it.
22	2	"A Snoozy Sleepover"	John Slama	May 10, 2019
When True invites her friends to a slumber party, the Rainbow King accidentally "sleeps-floats"; True's wishes have to help bring him back.
23	3	"True's Birthday Party"	Tom Berger	May 17, 2019
Everyone is preparing thoughtful surprises for True's birthday, including Grizelda, but a difficult situation leaves everything out of control.
24	4	"The Big Green Bounce"	Tom Berger	May 24, 2019
On the day of the Maker Shaker Expo, Grizelda's machine goes crazy and turns the citizens of the Rainbow Kingdom into inflatable green glitters. During a big warning, True continues to say that Grizelda's machine drinks water, and citizens are splashed by it, then they become dotted with moles, then they inflate and then bounce a lot. The Rainbow King also becomes an inflatable green bling. The inflatable green bling bling are white balls with green spots.
Wild Wild Yetis
25	5	"Itty Bitty Yeti"	Steve Westren	August 30, 2019
A Birdaloo tells True and Bartleby that a Yeti baby is about to be born, but when the word spreads, the kingdom goes crazy, and only a wish can fix it.
26	6	"Yeti Sitting"	Ashley Lannigan	September 5, 2019
True, Bartleby and Grizelda agree on "yeti sitting" the triplets, but it is more difficult than they thought.
27	7	"Mount Huffinpuff"	John Slama	September 12, 2019
The Yetis bring True and Bartleby to their secret splash park and accidentally altered the volcano, Mount Huffinpuff.
28	8	"Scratch and Share"	Emer Connon	September 19, 2019
Two Yetis tribes get into a big argument about who should get the Great Scraper of the Endless Forest.
29	9	"The Ni Ni Tree"	Tom Berger	September 26, 2019
Citizens do not understand the Yeti traditions and destroy their special lights. Meanwhile, Snik, True and Bartleby travel deep into the forest to find the magical Ni Ni tree.

== Related productions ==
=== Dance and Sing with True (2018) ===
A collection of songs featuring characters from the show.

=== True Tunes (2019) ===
On July 12, 2019, a collection of 8 original True and the Rainbow Kingdom-themed music videos were released on Netflix under the title True Tunes, featuring re-imagined versions of classic kids' songs based around the world and characters of the show.

=== True: Terrific Tales (2020) ===
A fairy-tale inspired spin-off series.

=== Specials (2019) ===
A number of additional specials were released: the Valentines Day special TRUE: Happy Hearts Day, the Easter special TRUE: Wuzzle Wegg Day, the Halloween Special TRUE: Tricky Treat Day, the Christmas special TRUE: Winter Wishes, the Thanksgiving special TRUE: Grabbleapple Harvest, the special TRUE: Rainbow Rescue, and the special TRUE: Friendship Day.

== Release ==
A sneak peek screening of the series was held on July 10, 2017 at a Pacific Theatres venue at The Grove at Farmers Market in Los Angeles. Among the attendees and guests were Frank Falcone, Bill Schultz, Pharrell Williams, the FriendsWithYou duo, Kelly Rowland, Christina Milian, and Tyga. The series was premiered on Netflix on August 11, 2017.

The second season began in production in 2017, slated to premiere in 2018. Later, Netflix announced that the second season would be released two standalone titles, True: Magical Friends and True: Wonderful Wishes, on June 15, 2018.

On September 28, 2017, another season of the series, which was scheduled to debut in 2019, was announced. The season, entitled Mushroom Town, was released on Netflix on May 3, 2019.

On May 18, 2018, Netflix launched Dance and Sing with True, a collection of music videos for remixes of songs from the show. On October 2, 2018, Netflix announced they will release specials and shorts. Shortly after, they confirmed another season.

The series was broadcast in the UK as a TV show on Tiny Pop from 4 April 2020 until March 2023.

== Awards and nominations ==
Year	Award	Category	Nominee	Result
2019	Kidscreen Awards	Best New Series		Nominated
2019	Kidscreen Awards	Best Animated Series		Nominated
2019	YMA Awards	Best Program, Animation – Preschool		Nominated
2020	8th Canadian Screen Awards	Best Pre-School Program or Series	True and the Rainbow Kingdom	Nominated
2020	Daytime Emmy Awards	Outstanding Directing for a Preschool Animated Program		Nominated
2021	9th Canadian Screen Awards	Best Pre-School Program or Series	True and the Rainbow Kingdom	Nominated
2021	9th Canadian Screen Awards	Shaw Rocket Fund Kids' Choice Award	True and the Rainbow Kingdom	Nominated
2021	9th Canadian Screen Awards	Best Direction in an Animated Program or Series	Mark Thornton, Todd Kauffman - "Friendship Day"	Nominated

== Merchandise and other media ==
As announced in February 2017, Home Plate Entertainment has appointed Brand Central in Los Angeles as the licensing agent of True and the Rainbow Kingdom. In August 2017, it was announced that Toy State has become the master toy licensee of the property, with first products to be released in fall 2018. In May 2018 announcement, more licensees, as brokered by Brand Central, were added. One of the newly named license holders was Chouette, which was given master publishing rights. The announcement stated that the products would be launched in fall 2018 in the United States, and in 2019 the rest of the world.
