= Mavournee Hazel =

Australian actress (born 1996)

- Born: 20 March 1996 (age 30); Adelaide, South Australia, Australia
- Occupation: Actress
- Years active: 2012–present

Mavournee Hazel (born 20 March 1996) is an Australian actress. She began her acting career with recurring and guest roles in various television shows, including Sam Fox: Extreme Adventures and Catching Milat. She joined the cast of Australian soap opera Neighbours as Piper Willis in 2015. She starred in four online spin-offs as Piper and received a nomination for Best Daytime Star at the 2018 Inside Soap Awards.

Hazel would later star as Zoe Sailer in Halifax: Retribution, Gemma in the Apple TV+ series Shantaram and as Bluebird "Blue" Gleeson in NCIS: Sydney.

In addition to acting, Hazel has also modelled for jewellery company Mimco and been a brand ambassador for Grey Goose.

== Early and personal life ==
Hazel grew up in Adelaide with her parents and three siblings. She attended Loreto College and later St Peter's Girls' School from which she graduated. During her time in school, Hazel made the South Australian State Lacrosse Team twice. Hazel always wanted to be an actor and she began a three-year course at SA Casting, a theatrical agency, when she was around eight years old. Hazel also took acting lessons with actress Doris Younane, whom she first met when Younane was a guest speaker at another course Hazel was taking. Younane later became Hazel's mentor and friend. Hazel acquired an acting agent, who advised her to relocate to Sydney or Melbourne after she finished school. She enrolled in an Advanced Media and Communications course at Sydney University, which allowed her to be in the city for auditions.

In 2019, Hazel came out as demisexual.

== Career ==
Hazel's career began with several recurring and guest roles in Totally Wild, Sam Fox: Extreme Adventures, Catching Milat, and Changed Forever: The Making of Australia. She also had a supporting role in short film Servo, which played at the St Kilda Film Festival.

In August 2015, it was announced that Hazel had joined the regular cast of Australian soap opera Neighbours as Piper Willis. She had completed a semester of her university course when she first auditioned for the role. Hazel flew to Melbourne for the audition and a meeting with the show's casting director. She then went through two more rounds of auditions, before she was told she had won the role a few months later. Hazel said she fell in love with her character after the first audition, and felt that there were many parallels between Piper and herself. She relocated to Melbourne within three days to be available for fittings and filming, and she made her first appearance as Piper on 16 September 2015. Hazel starred in four webisode series as Piper. The first, Hey Piper was released shortly before her debut appearance in the main show and features her character making video calls to members of her family. She then starred in the weekly series Pipe Up from 2016 until 2018. Hazel also appeared in Summer Stories and Neighbours vs Time Travel. For her portrayal of Piper, Hazel received a nomination for Best Daytime Star at the 2018 Inside Soap Awards.

Hazel decided to leave Neighbours in 2019. She explained to Maddison Hockey of TV Week that she had learned a lot from her time with the serial, but she wanted different challenges that came with new roles. She also found that she and Piper had almost become the same person and she needed to separate herself from her character. After leaving Neighbours, Hazel opted to stay and look for acting work in Australia. She made an appearance in the first season of crime drama My Life Is Murder in August 2019. That same year, she was cast as Zoe Sailer in Halifax: Retribution. Hazel underwent "a radical hair transformation" which helped her get into the character. She commented, "I was so grateful for it. I could look in the mirror and see Zoe and really have shed Piper." She also had to learn and sing the Billie Eilish song "Bad Guy" along with Craig Hall, who plays her character's father. The actors, who both lived in Sydney, rehearsed together and they bonded over the fact neither of them are singers.

In 2022, Hazel was cast as Gemma, the girlfriend of lead character Lin Ford (Charlie Hunnam), in Shantaram, a television adaption of Gregory David Roberts' novel of the same name. To prepare for the role, Hazel decided to read the novel, fearing she would be asked about it, and soon learned her character does not actually appear. Shantaram was filmed in Melbourne and Thailand. Hazel admitted that she was nervous about working one-on-one with Hunnam, having not acted since Halifax: Retribution. Their first scene was an intimate moment between their characters, which required them to attend intimacy training. Hazel described working on the series as "a pivotal moment" for her.

After filming Shantaram, Hazel was planning on going to Los Angeles and auditioning for the pilot season, before she was offered a role in the 2023 New Zealand thriller film Home Kills. Director Haydn Butler praised Hazel's audition and described her as "a powerhouse of an actor". The film was shot on-location in New Zealand and Hazel stars alongside Josh McKenzie, Cameron Jones and her former Neighbours co-star Stefan Dennis. The film had its world premiere at the New Zealand International Film Festival. That same year, Hazel joined the cast of the Network 10/Paramount+ series NCIS: Sydney as AFP Forensic Scientist Bluebird "Blue" Gleeson. The series, being filmed on-location in Sydney, is the first international edition of the NCIS franchise.

== Other work ==
Outside of acting, Hazel has modelled for Australian jewellery brand Mimco. She also took part in a fashion photo shoot with her Neighbours co-star Olympia Valance for social media. In August 2018, Hazel became an ambassador for Grey Goose vodka and her first event with the brand was the Melbourne Film Festival Opening Gala. She later appeared in clothing brand Sportsgirl's "Be That Girl" campaign.

== Filmography ==
Year	Title	Role	Notes
2010	Totally Wild		Guest role
2014	Sam Fox: Extreme Adventures	Emma Fernley Granger	Recurring role
2014	Servo	Jess	Short film
2015	Catching Milat	Caroline Clarke	Episodes: "1.1" and "1.2"
2015	Hey Piper	Piper Willis	Webseries
2015–2019	Neighbours	Piper Willis	Main role
2016	Changed Forever: The Making of Australia	Kathleen McGuiness	Docudrama
2016–2018	Pipe Up	Piper Willis	Webseries
2016	Summer Stories	Piper Willis	Webseries
2017	Neighbours vs Time Travel	Piper Willis	Webseries
2019	My Life Is Murder	Zoe Swann	Episode: "Feet of Clay"
2020	Halifax: Retribution	Zoe Sailer	Main role
2022	Shantaram	Gemma	Episodes: "Down and Out in Bombay" and "Like in the Time of Cholera"
2023	Home Kills	Anna	Feature film
2023– present	NCIS: Sydney	Bluebird "Blue" Gleeson	Main Role
