= Gasp! (TV series) =

Animated television series

- Genre: Comedy
- Based on: Gasp! by Terry Denton
- Directed by: Steve Moltzen
- Voices of: Jamie Oxenbould; Katherine Beck; Michelle Doake; Emma Palmer; David Callan
- Composers: Hylton Mowday; Ryan Grogan
- Countries of origin: Australia; Hong Kong
- Original language: English
- No. of seasons: 1
- No. of episodes: 52

Production
- Executive producers: Suzanne Ryan; Jo Rooney; Bill Schultz; Steven Ching
- Producers: Suzanne Ryan; Louisa Ma
- Running time: 13 minutes
- Production companies: SLR Productions; Screen Australia; Agogo Media

Original release
- Network: ABC3; Nine Network
- Release: February 26, 2011 – 2012

Gasp! is an animated television series based on the series of comics of the same name written and illustrated by Terry Denton.

The adaptation was produced by SLR Productions and Screen Australia for ABC Television and Nine Entertainment, distributed by MoonScoop Entertainment, animated with Flash by Agogo Media and ran on ABC3 and the Nine Network in 2011. The series was nominated for the International Animation Film Festival of Annecy for Official Selection TV Series and the ACCTA Awards for Best Children's TV Series in 2011 and the APRA Screen Music Awards for Best Music for Children's Television for Gasp! in 2012.

== Plot ==
The series follows the zany antics of a goldfish and his family-pet "cousins" left home alone when Mum, Dad, and their two kids, Ginger and her little brother Fred, have gone off to work, school or play.

== Characters ==
- Gasp – Voiced by Jamie Oxenbould
- Ginger – Voiced by Katherine Beck
- Fred — Voiced by Adam Whitby
- Mum – Voiced by Michelle Doake
- Catflap – Voiced by Emma Palmer
- Dogbox and Bettleneck – Voiced by David Callan

== Episodes ==
1. "Help a Spider" (2011)
2. "Frankenkitty" (2011)
3. "Fish Stick" (2011)
4. "Home and Host" (2011)
5. "My Pet Rocks" (2011)
6. "Hooray for Hamsterwood" (2011)
7. "My Little Carpcake" (2011)
8. "Pets for Pets" (2011)
9. "Thermostat War" (2011)
10. "For the Love of Dog" (2012)
11. "Gaspy Burpday" (2012)

== Broadcast ==
The series premiered on ABC3 on 9 August 2011 in Australia and ran from 2011 to 2012 (and has been put back on ABC3's schedule weekdays from 2015 to 2016). Previously, the show also aired on Canal+ Family in France and on Nine Network's schedule since 26 February of the same year.

Gasp! was broadcast on Nickelodeon in Australia and New Zealand (in both English and Māori), Kabillion in the United States, Pop in the UK and Disney Channel in Latin America.

The series is streaming in Australia on ABC's own ABC iview.
