= The Skinner Boys: Guardians of the Lost Secrets =

Animated television series

- Genre: Children's animated series
- Created by: Steve Lyons
- Directed by: Pablo De La Torre (season 1); Eugene Linkov (season 2)
- Creative director: Jo Boag
- Voices of: Paul Tylak; Damian Clarke; Derek Siow; Emma Tate; Lisa Moule; Dan Russell
- Countries of origin: Australia; Ireland; Germany
- Original language: English
- No. of series: 2
- No. of episodes: 52

Production
- Executive producers: Suzanne Ryan; Paul Cummins; Jo Rooney; Andy Ryan; Karen Mitrega; Lea Schmidt; Arne Lohmann; Wayne Dearing (season 1); Bill Schultz (season 1); Meike Schoel (season 2); Franziska Zerbin (season 2)
- Producers: Suzanne Ryan; Yasmin Jones; Siobhán Ní Ghadhra (season 1); Stella Dearing (season 1); Cathy Ní Fhlaithearta (season 2)
- Running time: 24 minutes
- Production companies: SLR Productions; Telegael Teoranta; ZDF Studios; Home Plate Entertainment (season 1); Top Draw Animation (season 1)

Original release
- Network: 9Go! (Australia); Super RTL (Germany)
- Release: 6 July 2014 – 22 December 2017

The Skinner Boys: Guardians of the Lost Secrets is a children's animated television series. Its first season of 26 episodes was shown on 9Go! on 6 July 2014 as part of Kids' WB. The second season premiered in 2017.

== Plot ==
The Skinner brothers Charles, Henry and Edward, inherit the Skinner Mansion from their explorer grandfather Augustus Skinner. Along with their teenage cousin Tara, they become the guardians of a collection of unique artifacts he has collected from across the world which possess powers.

== Cast ==
- Paul Tylak as Charles Skinner
- Damian Clarke as Henry Skinner
- Derek Siow as Edward Skinner
- Emma Tate as Julia Skinner
- Lisa Moule as Tara Skinner
- Dan Russell as Wellington

== Production ==
The Skinner Boys: Guardians of the Lost Secrets was produced by SLR Productions and Telegael Teoranta, who co-own copyright to the series, in association with Nine Network Australia, Super RTL and ZDF Studios. Home Plate Entertainment and Top Draw Animation co-produced the first season, while Toonz Entertainment animated the second season.

== Episodes ==
=== Season 1 (2014) ===
1. Nothing to Fear
2. Freezer Burn
3. The Drums of Doom
4. The Conflict Stone
5. The Eye of the Golden Snake
6. The Curse of the Ghost Train
7. The Castle of the Lost
8. The Mirror of Middlestep
9. The Dangers of the Deep
10. The Fire Opal
11. The Fountain of Youth
12. Grimm and Grimmer
13. The Wings of the Butterfly
14. Edward Saves the World
15. The Dragon's Breath
16. The Curse of Invisibility
17. The Crystal of Creation
18. The Sacred Scarab
19. The Molewhistle of East Grinsmead
20. The Swampies of the Deep South
21. The Lantern of Truth
22. The Ice Crystal
23. The Festival of the Ancestors
24. The Blood Bossom
25. The Tibetan Map of Destiny
26. Grandpa Skinner's Journal

=== Season 2 (2017) ===
1. The Body Clock of Tingri-La
2. The Crown of Ra
3. Logi's Shield
4. The Chimes of Change
5. Snakes Alive
6. The Ravenstone
7. The Wand of Enchantment
8. The Frog of Fertility
9. The Goblet of Goodearth
10. The Volcano Eggs
11. The Yeti and the Stone Maker
12. SOS Nessie
13. The Belt of Heracles
14. The Claw of the Werewolf
15. The Wishing Band
16. Yes Edward, Pixies Are Real
17. The Crystal Salt Shaker of Awesomeness
18. No Strings Attached
19. Tabula Rasa
20. The Carpathian Cookbook
21. The Bluebird of Happiness
22. Into Thin Air
23. Beware the Drop Bear
24. The Bear and the Wolf
25. The Hand of Oblivion
26. The Compass of Rattlesnake Ridge
