= Growing Up Creepie =

Animated television series

- Genre: Comedy horror
- Created by: Anthony Gaud; Chris Woods; Carin Greenberg
- Directed by: Sung Lin Gun; Guy Vasilovich; Andy Luckey
- Voices of: Athena Karkanis; David Berni; Dwayne Hill; Julie Lemieux; Leah Cudmore; Richard Yearwood; Stephanie Anne Mills; Stevie Vallance; Juan Chioran; Scott McCord; Jamie Watson; Patrick McKenna
- Opening theme: "Creepie Kids" by Samantha Lombardi
- Ending theme: "Creepie Kids" (instrumental)
- Composer: Guy Michelmore
- Countries of origin: United States; Canada
- No. of seasons: 1
- No. of episodes: 26 (52 segments)

Production
- Executive producers: Bill Schultz; Mike Young; Paul Cummins; Liz Young; Carin Greenberg; Elizabeth Koshy; Melinda Toporoff; Jim Rapsas
- Producers: Phil Dibartolo; Michark A. Puskas; Clarence Jeyaretnam; Siobhán Ní Ghadhra
- Editor: Steve "Sketch" Vallino
- Running time: 23 minutes (11 minutes per segment)
- Production companies: Mike Young Productions; DAG Entertainment; Telegael Teoranta; Sunwoo Entertainment; Peach Blossom Media

Original release
- Network: Discovery Kids
- Release: September 9, 2006 – June 21, 2008

Growing Up Creepie is an animated television series created by Anthony Gaud, Chris Woods, and Carin Greenberg, and produced by Mike Young Productions. In other countries, the series was simply titled Creepie. The series premiered on September 9, 2006, and ended on June 21, 2008, airing one season of 26 episodes.

== Premise ==
As told in the opening introduction and in the episode "Creepie Crawling", Creepie was an infant left on the doorstep of the Dweezwold Mansion, which is home to a family of various anthropomorphic insects. The family took her in and raised her as one of their own. She must now adjust to a life surrounded by a society of entomophobic humans as she attends Middlington Middle School and keeps her home life secret in order to protect both herself and her family.

== Characters ==
- Creepella "Creepie" Creecher (voiced by Athena Karkanis) – The protagonist of the series, a preteen human Goth girl raised by bugs, who was born with multicolored hair. She initially comes off as being sassy, but in reality, she is friendly and warm-hearted. Her catchphrase is "Wicked". She was abandoned on Caroleena and Vinnie's doorstep as a baby. Creepie's biological parents are never seen or mentioned, and no explanation is given for their absence. Her real name is Creepella, but everyone except Dr. Pappas and Vinnie calls her Creepie. If anyone ever finds out that Creepie is being raised by bugs, she will have no choice but to live somewhere else, and the Dweezwold Mansion will be fumigated by Mr. Hollyruller. Her favorite color is black, and she is fiercely protective of her family and other insects.
- Caroleena (voiced by Julie Lemieux) – A praying mantis who is Creepie's adoptive mother and Marge's best friend. She is very strict and constantly threatens to eat her children if they don't listen to her. It was her maternal instinct that persuaded her husband to adopt Creepie. She enjoys cooking.
- Vinnie (voiced by Dwayne Hill) – A mosquito who is Creepie's adoptive father. He is a New Age vegan that has a sinister vampiric appearance. Like his wife, he is loving to his adopted daughter. He loves to paint and meditate.
- Gnat (voiced by Stevie Vallance) – A gnat who is Creepie's younger brother. He constantly sneaks in Creepie's backpack and causes havoc at school. Gnat is actually older than Creepie, since he and Pauly were the ones that persuaded their family to adopt her.
- Pauly (voiced by David Berni) – A pillbug who is Creepie's older brother. He loves to eat and is a wisecracking jokester.
- Aunt Rose (voiced by Stevie Vallance) – A goliath tarantula of gargantuan proportions who is Creepie's adoptive aunt. Her appearance is never completely shown; however, her immense size and monstrous appearance makes everyone who sees her absolutely terrified, with the exception of Creepie. Due to this, she lives in the basement behind a heavily locked door, which she is typically seen beating against; aside from this, she only physically appears in four episodes. Despite her aggressive behavior, Aunt Rose is incredibly protective of her family and often behaves as the final line of defense against those that would try to eradicate them.
- Budge Bentley (voiced by Richard Yearwood) – Creepie's best friend, and the only one who knows Creepie's secret. While Budge might look like a bully because of his height and size, in reality, he is a sweet guy who wouldn't hurt a fly. He is friends with Creepie and Chris-Alice. Budge is very smart like his dad and loves yoga. He also loves entomology.
- Chris-Alice Hollyruller (voiced by Leah Cudmore) – Creepie's relentlessly happy-go-lucky friend and neighbor. Her catchphrases are "Soggy Muffins" and "Super Mega Duper". Chris-Alice is on the cheerleading squad, takes karate classes, and is always signing Creepie up for stuff at school without asking her first. Her favorite color is pink. Her name is a pun on the word chrysalis.
- George Hollyruller (voiced by Scott McCord) – Chris-Alice's father, who is the local exterminator. He is also the football coach at Middlington Middle School.
- Bunny Hollyruller (voiced by Stevie Vallance) – Chris-Alice's mother, who is a hard-selling real estate agent. Like Chris-Alice, she is bossy and perky.
- Carla Cabrera (voiced by Stephanie Anne Mills) and Melanie Melisma (voiced by Athena Karkanis) – Two popular girls who maintain an on/off again friendship with Creepie. They are obsessed with Harry Helby, shopping, fashion, makeup, and their cell phones. Carla is the leader of the duo, is constantly seen wearing her cheerleading outfit, and wears her hair in unbraided pigtails. Melanie is a stereotypical dumb blonde and has problems with pronunciation. Her outfit consists of an orange T-shirt with a yellow cat motif on the front, green cargo pants, and white and orange sneakers. She also loves shiny things and watches horror movies, almost as much as Budge. Melanie's favorite color is blue, and Carla's favorite color is purple. Carla and Melanie just want Creepie to be 'normal'.
- Harry Helby (voiced by Scott McCord) – The resident heartthrob who is obsessed with his hair. Melanie and Carla have a massive crush on him though he usually ignores them and is somewhat more interested in Creepie.
- Ms. Monserrate (voiced by Julie Lemieux) – A firm but fair disciplinarian and principal of Middlington Middle School. Like Dr. Pappas, she's always spying on Creepie and the other students at Middlington Middle School and is a stickler for rules. She is obsessed with cleanliness. Her catchphrase is "Detention!", and she will usually hand out a detention slip.
- Dr. Pappas (voiced by Juan Chioran) – Creepie's homeroom and science teacher who is a stickler for rules. Dr. Pappas is always spying on Creepie and the other students at Middlington Middle School. He never cuts anybody a break if they're late turning in a class assignment or homework. His catchphrase is "Miss Creecher!" He refers to the students by their last names. He is probably insecure due to being practically bald and having a big nose. He is afraid of Budge.
- Tarantula Boy (real name: Skipper) (voiced by Dan Petronijevic) – Creepie's love interest – seemingly half-human, half goliath tarantula – a headliner at the carnival "freaky" show. In the episode "Creepie Meets Tarantula Boy", Creepie later found out he was a normal kid and Tarantula Boy was just a costume and lost interest in him. However, in the episode "Return of Tarantula Boy", he appears in a movie and meets up with Creepie again. He introduces her to his mother, who is a real tarantula. In turn, she introduced him to her family, and it turns out that Creepie's mother knew his mom when they were kids. Later on, it is hinted that they would start a romantic relationship from then on, but it never developed.
- Marge (voiced by Leah Cudmore) – A giant tarantula who is Skipper's adoptive mother and Caroleena's best friend. In the episode "Creepie Meets Tarantula Boy", she was revealed to be a giant tarantula who wears hair curlers. She made caramel apples for the carnival and that's how Skipper came to be in the freak show.
- Dr. Lance Pierce (voiced by Patrick McKenna) – A prominent pin-happy entomologist at the Middlington Museum of Natural History and a minor antagonist in the series who only appears in three episodes. His catchphrase is "Oh, no!"

== Episodes ==
No.	Title	Written by	Storyboard by	Original release date
1	"The Tell-Tale Poem"	Carin Greenberg	Guy Vasilovich	September 9, 2006
1	"Creepie Meets Tarantula Boy"	Dennys McCoy and Pamela Hickey	Lane Lueras	September 9, 2006
"The Tell-Tale Poem": Creepie's Mother's Day poem piques the curiosity of her principal, who decides to meet her mother. "Creepie Meets Tarantula Boy": Creepie becomes smitten with a sideshow performer known as Tarantula Boy.
2	"The Scared Twitch Project"	Carin Greenberg	Peter Ferk	September 16, 2006
2	"Frogenstein"	Carin Greenberg	Todd Waterman	September 16, 2006
"The Scared Twitch Project": While on a camping trip, Creepie tries to find evidence of "Bugfoot", a massive prehistoric wasp. "Frogenstein": Creepie resurrects the frog she was supposed to dissect for science class.
3	"Bug It On"	Sharon Schatz Rosenthal	Trevor Wall	September 23, 2006
3	"The Case of the Mysterious Moth"	Heather Mitchell	Lane Lueras	September 23, 2006
"Bug It On": Creepie helps her school's cheerleading squad win a competition after a rival steals their routine. "The Case of the Mysterious Moth": Creepie attends a sleepover that seems to be haunted by a ghost moth.
4	"Attack of the Wasp Zombies"	Ken Pontac	Dan Kubat and Anson Jew	October 14, 2006
4	"Legend of the Locker"	Rick Demott	Ian Freedman and Bert Ring	October 14, 2006
"Attack of the Wasp Zombies": While watching old horror films, Creepie dreams that her classmates have been turned into zombies by a wasp. "Legend of the Locker": When a rival tries to frighten Creepie with the story of "Gina Redshoes", she decides to teach him a lesson.
5	"Bite Nite"	Dennys McCoy and Pamela Hickey	Peter Ferk	October 28, 2006
5	"Night of Fright"	Carin Greenberg	Dan Kubat	October 28, 2006
"Bite Nite": Creepie suspects her mosquito cousins are responsible when blood from a blood drive goes missing. "Night of Fright": While Creepie attends a party at Chris-Alice's, a mix-up sends Melanie and Carla to Creepie's house.
6	"Roaché Motel"	Don Gillies	Trevor Wall and Peter Ferk	November 4, 2006
6	"Little Greenhouse of Horrors"	Don Gillies	Todd Waterman	November 4, 2006
"Roaché Motel": While on a road trip with Chris-Alice and her mom, Creepie suspects something is amiss at the roadside motel they stop at. "Little Greenhouse of Horrors": Creepie, Gnat, and Pauly are threatened by massive carnivorous plants and their gardener at the local greenhouse.
7	"Field of Screams"	Douglas Booth	Todd Waterman and Trevor Wall	November 25, 2006
7	"Mom Under Glass"	Dennys McCoy and Pamela Hickey	Roy Smith and Trevor Wall	November 25, 2006
"Field of Screams": Creepie fights to protect an endangered beetle on the school football field from Chris-Alice's exterminator father. "Mom Under Glass": After a small spat with her mom, Creepie must save her from an entomologist determined to add her to his collection.
8	"Goth to Have Better Friends"	Corey Powell	Trevor Wall and Kirk Tingblat	January 13, 2007
8	"Wax Attacks"	Corey Powell	Peter Ferk	January 13, 2007
"Goth to Have Better Friends": Creepie begins to hang out with some new goth friends, but begins to neglect Chris-Alice and Budge. "Wax Attacks": Creepie takes Harry to a wax museum where people have disappeared.
9	"Headless Roach Man"	Ruby Ann Bradt Vanderzee and Rowan Cutler	Todd Waterman and Trevor Wall	January 20, 2007
9	"Invasion of the Locusts"	Bryan Thompson	Peter Ferk and Kevin Pawlak	January 20, 2007
"Headless Roach Man": A costume party at school has Creepie mistaking an actual giant headless roach for Budge. "Invasion of the Locusts": When Creepie's locust relatives come for a visit, they begin to devour most of the town.
10	"Creepie's Living Doll"	Corey Powell	Garrett Ho	January 27, 2007
10	"Operation Monarch Liberation"	Meredith Jennings Offen	Gary Hartle and Todd Waterman	January 27, 2007
"Creepie's Living Doll": Creepie receives a belated birthday present: a doll that seems to show up everywhere she goes. "Operation Monarch Liberation": Thinking she is doing the right thing, Creepie releases a swarm of Monarch Butterflies from their sanctuary, unaware they aren't prepared for freedom.
11	"Bait and Switch"	Story by : Rick Demmott; Teleplay by : Carin Greenberg	Ian Freedman and Garrett Ho	March 31, 2007
11	"Shutterbug"	Story by : Laurai Israel and Rachel Ruderman; Teleplay by : Carin Greenberg	Todd Waterman	March 31, 2007
"Bait and Switch": Creepie joins Chris-Alice and her dad on a fishing trip to a lake rumored to be the home of a giant crab. "Shutterbug": A school assignment on hobbies leads Creepie to discover a love of photography.
12	"Bad Karma Chameleon"	Meredith Jennings Offen	Jon Hooper and Trevor Wall	April 7, 2007
12	"Home is Where the Haunt Is"	Bryan Thompson	Gary Hartle and Trevor Wall	April 7, 2007
"Bad Karma Chameleon": Creepie reluctantly agrees to watch Chris-Alice's pet, only to discover it is a bug-eating Chameleon. "Home is Where the Haunt Is": After her parents decide they need a bigger house, Creepie makes her home appear haunted to scare away potential buyers.
13	"Creepie Friday"	Bryan Thompson	Peter Ferk	April 28, 2007
13	"The Final Curtain"	Laurai Israel and Rachel Ruderman	Todd Waterman	April 28, 2007
"Creepie Friday": Creepie worries for her family's safety after coming home to an empty house. "The Final Curtain": Creepie and her friends must put on their school play in an old abandoned theater where spooky things happen.
14	"Creepie and the Candy Factory"	Story by : Erin Fox; Teleplay by : Roger Eschbacher	Enrique May	May 26, 2007
14	"The Ice Bug Cometh"	Story by : Kati Rocky and Eric Trueheart; Teleplay by : Eric Trueheart	Gary Hartle	May 26, 2007
"Creepie and the Candy Factory": Creepie and Chris-Alice take a tour of a candy factory. "The Ice Bug Cometh": A frozen prehistoric bug is thawed out, and Creepie invites him to her home.
15	"Are You Afraid of the Moths?"	Laurai Israel and Rachel Ruderman	Trevor Wall	June 9, 2007
15	"Revenge of the Water Bug"	Mitchell Larson	Trevor Wall and John Perkins	June 9, 2007
"Are You Afraid of the Moths?": Creepie tells her scout troop a campfire story about giant moths that abduct campers. "Revenge of the Water Bug": When her principal flushes a water beetle down the toilet and the bug returns seeking revenge, Creepie tries to protect her.
16	"Nightmare on Locust Lane"	Peggy Sarlin	Gary Hartle and Trevor Wall	October 13, 2007
16	"The Mummy's Curse"	Bryan Thompson	Peter Ferk	October 13, 2007
"Nightmare on Locust Lane": Bizarre electrical disturbances at her house convince Chris-Alice that it's haunted, so Creepie tries to find the real culprit. "The Mummy's Curse": A field trip to a new Egyptian tomb exhibit leads Creepie to an ancient mummy's curse and a mysterious dung beetle.
17	"Children of the Pumpkin Patch"	Story by : Ruby Ann Bradt Vanderzee, Rowan Cutler and Bryan Thompson; Teleplay by : Bryan Thompson	Todd Waterman	October 27, 2007
17	"Night of a Thousand Legs"	Bryan Thompson	Guy Vasilovich and Trevor Wall	October 27, 2007
"Children of the Pumpkin Patch": While out picking pumpkins, Creepie and her friends spend the day on a farm, where they are menaced by a living scarecrow. "Night of a Thousand Legs": It's Halloween and when her Aunt Rose gets loose, Creepie and Budge have to track her down.
18	"Lice Lice Baby"	Carin Greenberg	Peter Ferk and Mark Maxey	November 10, 2007
18	"Scorpiophobia"	Ruby Ann Bradt Vanderzee & Rowan Cutler	Peter Ferk	November 10, 2007
"Lice Lice Baby": Creepie's lice cousins visit her at school, causing the principal to lock down the school to prevent an outbreak. "Scorpiophobia": Creepie and her friends attend the premiere of the newest blockbuster film, "Scorpiophobia", only to discover the movie theater has been infested by real scorpions.
19	"On Thin Ice"	Laurai Israel & Rachel Ruderman	Mike Manley	November 24, 2007
19	"Toxic Mutant Millipede"	Laurai Israel & Rachel Ruderman	Enrique May	November 24, 2007
"On Thin Ice": A snow day has Creepie and her friends enjoying themselves until a mysterious snowman starts to show up everywhere they go. "Toxic Mutant Millipede": Creepie and Budge must rescue Chris-Alice and Harry from a new arcade game after they get trapped inside.
20	"I Was a Teenage Wolfbug"	Bryan Thompson	Peter Ferk and Todd Waterman	December 8, 2007
20	"Outta Sight Space Bowl Night"	Ruby Ann Bradt Vanderzee & Rowan Cutler	Enrique May and Todd Waterman	December 8, 2007
"I Was a Teenage Wolfbug": Exposure to a growth formula at school causes Gnat to grow to the size of a human kid, and he decides to spend the day as Creepie's classmate, while Budge tries to make an antidote. "Outta Sight Space Bowl Night": A father/student bowling tournament to celebrate an outer space-themed bowling alley's grand opening has Creepie feeling left out since her father isn't really a bowler.
21	"Rockabye Freakie"	Ruby Ann Bradt Vanderzee & Rowan Cutler	Peter Ferk	January 12, 2008
21	"Creep of the Deep"	Laurai Israel and Rachel Ruderman	Lynell Forstall	January 12, 2008
"Rockabye Freakie": Creepie reads the story of "Snow Black" to the baby bugs of Dweezwold. "Creep of the Deep": A day at the beach finds Creepie helping a hermit crab and competing in a surf contest against her friends, but the crab decides to return the favor by sabotaging her competition.
22	"Going for Brogue"	Matt Wayne	Lane Lueras	January 26, 2008
22	"Yellow Jacket Racket"	Bryan Thompson	Bert Ring and Enrique May	January 26, 2008
"Going for Brogue": Creepie joins her goth friend's band as a bagpiper so they can play at the school dance, but Chris-Alice begins to notice her strange interaction with bugs. "Yellow Jacket Racket": Creepie tries to help Gnat learn to defend himself after he has a run-in with some bullying yellow jackets.
23	"The Return of Tarantula Boy"	Dennys McCoy and Pamela Hickey	Todd Waterman	February 9, 2008
23	"All the President's Pests"	Story by : Laurai Israel and Rachel Ruderman; Teleplay by : Eric Trueheart	Lane Lueras and Todd Waterman	February 9, 2008
"The Return of Tarantula Boy": Tarantula Boy returns, and Creepie finds they have much more in common than she thought. "All the President's Pests": Chris-Alice is running for class president against school heartthrob Harry, but it's Creepie to the rescue when someone starts sabotaging her campaign.
24	"Creep of the Crop"	Laurai Israel and Rachel Ruderman	Larry Houston	March 1, 2008
24	"Creepie Cousin"	Laurai Israel and Rachel Ruderman	Trevor Wall and Luther McLaurin	March 1, 2008
"Creep of the Crop": Creepie helps Chris-Alice investigate crop circles at a local farm for their school paper while trying to protect her brothers from Mr. Hollyruller. "Creepie Cousin": Creepie babysits Chris-Alice's little cousin, unaware that he likes to squash bugs.
25	"Creepie Crawling"	Ruby Ann Bradt Vanderzee and Rowan Cutler	Jay Olivia	April 12, 2008
25	"Fashion Victim"	Story by : Roger Eschbacher and Peggy Sarlin; Teleplay by : Peggy Sarlin	Mike Manley	April 12, 2008
"Creepie Crawling": Creepie tells the story of a baby left on the doorstep of a mansion where bugs live. "Fashion Victim": Trying to rescue her brothers from Carla's lunch bag leads Creepie to get an impromptu makeover and enter a fashion contest.
26	"Wanna Bee"	Bryan Thompson	Todd Waterman	June 21, 2008
26	"The Haunting of Tiki Lagoon"	Bryan Thompson	Peter Ferk	June 21, 2008
"Wanna Bee": After a new girl becomes more popular than Carla, Creepie helps her frenemy try and dethrone the new queen bee. "The Haunting of Tiki Lagoon": Creepie and her friends find a treasure map that takes them to a small island in the town lake that is rumored to be haunted.

== Music ==
The theme song "Creepie Kids" and other songs featured throughout the series were performed by Samantha Lombardi. They were written by Michael Puskas, Samantha Lombardi, and Clarence Jey, and produced by Michael Puskas and Clarence Jey. "Creepie Kids" and the song "Life Lessons", heard in the episode "Goth to Have Better Friends", were released on Lombardi's 2007 album, Full Stop. The music was featured on a DVD released by Mike Young Productions.

The instrumental score heard throughout the show was composed by Guy Michelmore, who was nominated for an Annie for his music for the series.

== Reception ==
Pam Gelman of Common Sense Media gave the series 3 out of 5 stars; saying that, "Growing Up Creepie has lots of dark, Tim Burton-esque visuals and scary organ tunes, but older grade-schoolers and tweens will recognize that both are used for dramatic effect and will be able to focus on Creepie's day-to-day challenges."

=== Awards and nominations ===
Year	Award	Category	Nominee(s)	Result	Ref.
2007	Annie Awards	Directing in an Animated Television Production	Guy Vasilovich (for "The Tell-Tale Poem")	Nominated	
2007	Daytime Emmy Awards	Outstanding Special Class Animated Program	Growing Up Creepie	Nominated	
2008	Annie Awards	Animation Production Artist	Natasha Liberman (for "Creepie and the Candy Factory")	Nominated	
2008	Daytime Emmy Awards	Outstanding Individual Achievement in Animation	Peter Ferk	Won (Note: Shared with El Tigre: The Adventures of Manny Rivera and Wow! Wow! Wubbzy!.)	
2009	Annie Awards	Music in an Animated Television Production or Short Form	Guy Michelmore (for "Rockabye Freakie")	Nominated	

== Home media ==
A DVD of Growing Up Creepie was released for Region 1 from Genius Products on August 28, 2007. The single disc volume is titled Creepie's Creatures Volume 1 and features seven episodes. Bonus features include Creepie's Buggin' Trivia Game and an episode of Jeff Corwin Unleashed entitled "Creepy Creatures". It also had a DVD release in Australia from Madman Entertainment. There were plans for other volumes in Australia but they were never released. The episode "Creep of the Deep" appears as a bonus feature on Kenny the Shark Volume 3: Catch a Wave.

DVD title	Episode count	Release date	Episodes
Creepie Creatures Volume 1	7	August 28, 2007	2b ("Frogenstein"), 3b ("The Case of the Mysterious Moth"), 5b ("Night of Fright"), 10a ("Creepie's Living Doll"), 13a ("Creepie Friday"), 15a ("Are You Afraid of the Moths?"), and 16a ("Nightmare on Locust Lane")
