= Sam Fox: Extreme Adventures =

Television series

- Genre: Teen drama
- Written by: Justin D'Ath
- Starring: Remy Brand; Stanley Browning; Emily Bagg
- Composer: Guy Gross
- Countries of origin: Australia; Germany
- Original language: English
- No. of seasons: 1
- No. of episodes: 26

Production
- Executive producers: Suzanne Ryan; Cherrie Bottger; Arne Lohmann
- Producers: Suzanne Ryan; Michael Bourchier
- Production locations: Adelaide, South Australia
- Running time: 30 minutes
- Production companies: SLR Productions; Kojo; ZDF Enterprises

Original release
- Network: Eleven
- Release: 20 July 2014 – 11 January 2015

Sam Fox: Extreme Adventures is a television programme for children and teenagers.

Production commenced in early 2013 with filming on various South Australian beaches and locales. The 26 part series was produced by SLR Productions and Kojo, in association with ZDF Enterprises, and was first screened in 2014 on Eleven and Cartoon Network.

The series aired in a subtitled Dutch language version on the Flemish public channel Ketnet from June 2015. It also aired in a dubbed French language version on France 4 since 2015 and in a dubbed German language version on Kika from August 2019.

== Cast ==
- Remy Brand as Sam Fox
- Stanley Browning as Sam's buddy, Rikki McGrath
- Harry Russell and Angus Russell as rascal twins Harry Fox and Jordan Fox, alias agents H and J, Sam's kid brothers
- Andrew Lindqvist as Nathan Fox, Sam's big brother
- Charles Mayer as Kingston Fox, Sam's father
- Luca Sardelis as April Fox, Sam's grumpy younger sister
- Emily Bagg as Josie Brown
- Mavournee Hazel as Emma Fernley Granger
- Tiffany Lyndall-Knight as photographer Laura Fox, Sam's mother

== Episodes ==
Episode information retrieved from Australian Television Information Archive.

No.	Title	Directed by	Written by	Original release date
1	"Shark Bait"	Evan Clarry	Keith Thompson	20 July 2014
2	"Grizzly Trap"	Arnie Custo	Keith Thompson	27 July 2014
3	"Cobra Combat"	Evan Clarry	Keith Thompson	3 August 2014
4	"Dingo Danger"	Evan Clarry	Tamara Asmar	10 August 2014
5	"Spider Bite"	Bill Hughes	James Walker	17 August 2014
6	"Anaconda Ambus"	Julie Money	Graeme Farmer	24 August 2014
7	"Lava Charge"	Evan Clarry	Chris McCourt	31 August 2014
8	"Cassowary Chaos"	Bill Hughes	Simon Butters	7 September 2014
9	"Sand Blast"	Evan Clarry	Chris Hawkshaw	14 September 2014
10	"Komodo Prey"	Arnie Custo	Holly Lyons	21 September 2014
11	"Alligator Swamp"	Julie Money	Tamara Asmar	28 September 2014
12	"Man Eater"	Arnie Custo	Chris Roache	5 October 2014
13	"Elephant Storm"	Arnie Custo	Jane Allen	12 October 2014
14	"Cat Attack"	Arnie Custo	Chris Hawkshaw	19 October 2014
15	"Snake Siege"	Julie Money	Graeme Farmer	26 October 2014
16	"Bushfire Rescue"	Bill Hughes	Brendan Luno	2 November 2014
17	"Bear Blitz"	Karl Zwicky	Chris McCourt	9 November 2014
18	"Rattle Rush"	Bill Hughes	David Lawrance	16 November 2014
19	"Blue Venom"	Julie Money	Kym Goldsworthy	23 November 2014
20	"Monkey Mayhem"	Arnie Custo	Michelle Offen	30 November 2014
21	"Bollywood Breakout"	Karl Zwicky	Tamara Asmar	7 December 2014
22	"Muster Madness"	Arnie Custo	Simon Butters	14 December 2014
23	"Rhino Rampage"	Arnie Custo	David Witt	21 December 2014
24	"Panther Pursuit"	Arnie Custo	James Walker	28 December 2014
25	"Croc Fever"	Karl Zwicky	Jane Schneider	4 January 2015
26	"Polar Peril"	Karl Zwicky	Justine Gillmer	11 January 2015
