= Bill Schultz (producer) =

American animation producer (born 1960)

- Born: June 11, 1960 (age 66); New York, New York, U.S.
- Education: University of Illinois Urbana-Champaign
- Occupation: Producer

Bill Schultz (born June 11, 1960) is an American animation producer. He was born in New York City and grew up in River Forest, a suburb near Chicago, Illinois, moving to Los Angeles after graduating from the University of Illinois Champaign – Urbana Campus. He has worked on television shows such as Jim Henson's Muppet Babies, The Transformers, and produced others, notably The Simpsons and King of the Hill and now the founder and CEO of Home Plate Entertainment. Schultz started Home Plate Entertainment in 2010, after stepping down from his 12-year partnership with Splash Entertainment.

== Career ==
His first job in LA found him working for Capitol Records, which after 9 months he left to work with an independent film producer, and then to work as a production assistant and production staffer on several low-budget live-action feature films. He eventually got a job at Columbia Pictures Television, working on primetime TV series such as Mickey Spillane's Mike Hammer and TJ Hooker.

In 1986, Schultz moved from Santa Barbara's production staff to help with the management of Marvel Productions. Schultz worked on titles such as Jim Henson's Muppet Babies, The Transformers, G.I. Joe: A Real American Hero, and My Little Pony 'n Friends among others.

Introduced to veteran Animation Director Phil Roman in late 1986, Schultz was hired as VP of Production and Development of Film Roman. In 1988, the new management team developed, sold and produced Bobby's World and Zazoo U. As Executive Vice President at Film Roman for nine years, Schultz managed the growth of the studio, as a producer for 6 seasons on two FOX primetime series, The Simpsons and King of the Hill.

He has even worked on almost every Film Roman cartoon including The Critic, Garfield and Friends, Garfield TV specials, The Mask, The Twisted Tales of Felix the Cat, C-Bear and Jamal, Bruno the Kid, Mortal Kombat, Richie Rich, Klutter!, Cro, Mighty Max, Mother Goose and Grimm, Nick and Noel, The Bears Who Saved Christmas, Animated Classic Showcase and Tom and Jerry: The Movie.

After nine years of running the company and 18 months after taking the company public (in 1995) Schultz left to find new opportunities. He started work with Los Angeles–based independent animator Mike Young, producing Voltron: The Third Dimension and forming an ongoing partnership which exists today. In addition, he was contacted by Cartoon Network's Linda Simensky and asked to come to Atlanta to meet with the Network's management team, including head Betty Cohen, GM Rob Sorcher, Mike Lazzo, and Simensky. Schultz was hired to help the network set up its own Cartoon Network Studios located in Burbank, California, as well as act as the supervising producer for the network on its non-Hanna Barbera series, including Ed, Edd n Eddy, Courage the Cowardly Dog, and others. Schultz continued his relationship with the network up until 2002.

In 2005, Schultz and his partners at MYP merged the Los Angeles–based company with French entertainment company and animation studio MoonScoop.

While working at Taffy Entertainment, Schultz launched Kabillion, a new multi-platform kids entertainment service, in January 2007. The Platform was developed in conjunction with New Jersey–based REMIX Entertainment Ventures and Comcast. Together the partners raised three million dollars to launch the network. Kabillion is available both as a free video on-demand (VOD) channel and a free online broadband site. Kabillion is owned in part by Taffy Entertainment, East Coast–based REMIX Entertainment Ventures and Germany's EM.Entertainment.

While as the CEO of Kabillion, Schultz launched a new cross promotion with uWink, Inc.. UWink, a new interactive restaurant that allowed customers to order food, drinks, games, and other digital media at their table through proprietary touch screen terminals was founded by Nolan Bushnell, former founder and CEO of Atari and Chuck E. Cheese's. Under the agreement, uWink offered new Kabillion-branded video games for kids, in addition to kids’ meals featuring characters from Kabillion's animated programs, as well as high-quality toys and plush from Taffy Entertainment, the parent company of Kabillion.

Schultz is an executive producer on MYP's latest productions, including Hero: 108, which is a co-production with Cartoon Network, Growing Up Creepie for Discovery Kids/Nickelodeon, I Got a Rocket!, and the pre-school CGI series Dive Olly Dive!, as well as returning series Pet Alien and ToddWorld. In addition, Schultz was nominated for a Daytime Emmy Award in 2007 as a songwriter, along with co-writers, Mike Himmelstein and Al Jarreau, for their song, "Take a Look Inside," which is featured in the ToddWorld series.

In late September 2010, he launched his own animation studio: Home Plate Entertainment.

Since then, Schultz has continued to build Home Plate Entertainment by exploring new directions for the company. Some of his most recent ventures include a Netflix original series entitled True and the Rainbow Kingdom, a Chinese feature film based on the classic novel, Romance of The Three Kingdoms, entitled The 12 Guardians, and a stop motion feature produced in conjunction with China Film Group entitled, Codename Housewife.

Schultz has won two Daytime Emmy Awards (for I Got a Rocket! and Jakers) and two Primetime Emmy Awards (for The Simpsons). His other awards include the Humanitas Prize (for ToddWorld), a BAFTA (for Jakers! The Adventures of Piggley Winks), the Pulcinella (for Growing Up Creepie), and the Hugo Award (for ToddWorld).
