= Home Plate Entertainment =

American animation studio

- Company type: Public
- Industry: Animation
- Genre: Various
- Founded: September 28, 2010
- Founder: Bill Schultz
- Headquarters: Bell Canyon, California, United States
- Key people: Bill Schultz (CEO); Brad Schultz (Vice President and Business development); Murray Schultz (Senior Vice President); Laura Forst; Frank Chad Muniz
- Products: Television programs Motion pictures
- Website: homeplateentertainment.com

Home Plate Entertainment is an American animation studio, founded in 2010 by Emmy Award-winning producer Bill Schultz.

== History ==
On September 28, 2010, Bill Schultz established Home Plate Entertainment after years of animation experience, including 12 years of working at MoonScoop Entertainment. The studio has partnered with Yowza! Animation and several other studios.

== Filmography ==
=== Television series ===
Show	Co-producers	Premiere date	End date	Broadcaster(s)	Distributor
Wild Grinders	Telegael; MoonScoop Entertainment (season 1); Four Down Productions (season 1); Agogo Media (season 1); Copernicus Studios (season 1); Superjacket Productions (season 2); Top Draw Animation (season 2); Big Jump Entertainment (season 2)	April 27, 2012	February 12, 2015	Nicktoons	MoonScoop Entertainment
Teenage Fairytale Dropouts	Ánima Estudios; SLR Productions; Telegael; CCI Entertainment	December 31, 2012	December 23, 2013	Hub Network	CCI Entertainment
The Skinner Boys: Guardians of the Lost Secrets (season 1)	SLR Productions; Telegael; ZDF Enterprises; Top Draw Animation	July 6, 2014	October 29, 2014	Nine Network	ZDF Enterprises
True and the Rainbow Kingdom	Guru Studio; JKL Worldwide; FriendsWithYou	August 11, 2017	August 30, 2019	TVOntario	Guru Studio

=== Music videos ===
Title	Premiere date
Moshi Twistmas	December 2, 2011
Shelby Star	Early 2014

=== In production ===
Show	Co-productions	Premiere date	Broadcaster(s)
Jimmy Stones	TBA	TBA	TBA

== See also ==
- Bill Schultz (producer)
