= Kabillion =

Video-on-demand service

- Country: United States
- Network: On demand
- Headquarters: Los Angeles, California

Programming
- Language: English

Ownership
- Owner: Splash Entertainment

History
- Launched: January 7, 2007; 19 years ago

Links
- Website: www.kabillion.com

Kabillion is an American children's video on demand channel owned by Splash Entertainment. Launched on January 7, 2007, Kabillion is available both as a free VOD channel currently available on Xfinity, Spectrum, Charter Communications, Cox Communications, Verizon Fios, Frontier FiberOptic and Optimum West digital cable systems across the United States, and as an OTT Network available on Sling TV, Roku, Amazon Fire TV, and Apple TV. Its headquarters are in Los Angeles, California.

The service is divided into two distinct services, Kabillion, which features general audience programming, and Kabillion Girls Rule, which mainly features programming for both young girls and preschoolers. Both of these services carry productions from Splash Entertainment's catalog (some of which were formerly part of MoonScoop). However, they also carry a variety of licensed titles from other outside production companies. Among these outside productions, the Mexican-animated show El Chavo Animado made its English-language debut on Kabillion sometime in 2010. Later, on April 29, 2013, Kabillion entered a partnership with Saban Brands to add programming from The CW's Saturday-morning Vortexx block to the existing Kabillion service.

Kabillion also has several online presences. The company has been on YouTube since February 13, 2007. In July 2016, Kabillion partnered with Xumo to add VOD content to the service as well as a 24-hour live Kabilion channel. In August 2018, in a partnership with Amazon, Kabillion launched its current online merchandise store. In April 2019, Kabillion branched out on to Twitch, with its streams centered around live interviews with members of the animation industry as well as some episodic binge streams of its series.
