= List of Banijay Entertainment programs =

This is a list of programs produced by Banijay Entertainment containing shows from several different divisions all over the world, including North America, Australia, the United Kingdom and its divisions of past and present among others.

== Banijay Americas ==
=== Banijay Studios North America ===
Title	Years	Network	Notes
Wife Swap	2004–2019	ABC/Paramount Network	continued from Zodiak USA
Child Support	2018	ABC	
The Secret Life of Kids	2018	USA Network	co-production with Gulfstream Media and USA Network Media Productions
Teyana & Iman	2018	VH1	
Temptation Island	2019–present	USA Network	
Don't	2020	ABC	co-production with Maximum Effort

=== Endemol Shine North America ===
Title	Years	Network	Notes
Big Brother	2000–present	CBS	continued from Endemol USA co-production with Fly on the Wall Entertainment
Fear Factor	2001–2018	NBC/MTV	continued from Endemol USA
Extreme Makeover: Home Edition	2004–2020	ABC/HGTV	continued from Endemol USA co-production with Base Camp Films, Hoosick Fall Productions, Tom Forman Productions, Denise Cramsey Productions and Monkupower, Inc.
The Biggest Loser	2004–2020	NBC/USA Network	co-production with 3 Ball Entertainment (2004–2016), Twenty Five Seven Productions (2004–2016) Universal Television Alternative Studio (2020) and USA Network Media Productions (2020)
The Office	2005–2013	NBC	co-production with Universal Television and Deedle-Dee Productions; Owned by NBCUniversal Syndication Studios
Deal or No Deal	2005–2019	NBC/Syndicated/CNBC	continued from Endemol USA co-production with Entertain the Brutes and Truly Original
The Tudors	2007–2010	BBC Two; CBC; TV3; Showtime	As Reveille Eire; Co-produced with Working Title Television, Octagon Entertainment, Peace Arch Entertainment and Showtime Networks
Do Not Disturb	2008	Fox	as Reveille Productions co-production with Broken Good Productions, Principato-Young Entertainment and 20th Century Fox Television
MasterChef	2010–present	Fox	co-production with One Potato Two Potato
The Biggest Loser: Pinoy Edition	2011–2014	ABS-CBN	as Reveille Productions co-production with NBCUniversal Philippine version of the American series of the same name.
Steve Harvey	2012–2017	Syndication	continued from Endemol USA; Distributed by NBCUniversal Television Distribution
MasterChef Junior	2013–present	Fox	co-production with One Potato Two Potato
Restaurant Startup	2014–2016	CNBC	
Gracepoint	2014	Fox	co-production with Kudos Film & Television, Imaginary Friends and South Slope Pictures
Pitbull's New Year's Revolution	2014–2016	Fox	continued from Shine America; co-production with Honey I'm Home and Switched On Entertainment
The Island	2015	NBC	Co-produced with Bear Grylls Ventures
Bullseye	2015	Fox	co-production with Lock and Key Productions
Billion Dollar Buyer	2016–2018	CNBC	
The Almost Impossible Game Show	2016	MTV	
Hunted	2017	CBS	
Superhuman	2017	Fox	
Page Six TV	2017–2019	Syndication	co-production with 20th Television and New York Post
Staten Hustle Island	2018	CNBC	co-production with Left Hook Media
Family Food Fight	2019	ABC	co-production with Yardie Girl Productions
The Masked Singer	2019	Fox	co-production with Smart Dog Media and MBC
Almost Family	2019–2020	Fox	co-production with Parasox, True Jack Productions, Fox Entertainment, XOF Productions and Universal Television
Lego Masters USA	2020–present	Fox	Based on the UK format. co-production with Plan B Entertainment and Tuesday's Child
Wipeout	2021–present	TBS	co-production with Pulse Creative and Hard Nocks South Productions
Foodtastic	2021	Disney+	
The Courtship	2022–present	NBC/USA Network	
Hot Wheels: Ultimate Challenge	2023–present	NBC	co-production with Workerbee TV and Mattel Television
The Summit	2024	CBS	
The Paper	2025–present	Peacock	co-production with Deedle-Dee Productions, W.D.M. Productions, 3 Arts Entertainment and Universal Television
Fear Factor: House of Fear	2026–present	Fox	

==== Endemol USA ====
Title	Years	Network	Notes
Spy TV	2001–2002	NBC	Co-produced with Lock and Key Productions and Next Entertainment
1 vs. 100	2006–2011	NBC/GSN	
Show Me the Money	2006	ABC	
Gay, Straight or Taken?	2007	Lifetime	
Set for Life	2007	ABC	
Kid Nation	2007	CBS	co-production with Tom Forman Productions
Celebrity Circus	2008	NBC	co-production with Pulse Creative
Wipeout	2008–2014	ABC	co-production with Pulse Creative
Queen Bees	2008	The N	
Estate of Panic	2008	Sci-Fi Channel	
20Q	2009	GSN	
101 Ways to Leave a Game Show	2011	ABC	co-production with Pulse Creative and Lock and Key Productions
Love in the Wild	2011–2012	NBC	co-production with Steele Mill Productions
Built	2013	Style Network	
The Winner Is	2013	NBC	co-production with Talpa Media USA, Smart Dog Media and Universal Television
Sing Your Face Off	2014	ABC	
Virgin Territory	2014	MTV	

==== Shine America ====
Title	Years	Network	Notes
Nashville Star	2003–2008	USA Network/NBC	as Reveille Productions co-production with Universal Media Studios and 495 Productions
Coupling	2003	NBC	as Reveille Productions co-production with Universal Network Television, NBC Studios and Mauretania Productions
Blow Out	2004–2006	Bravo	as Reveille Productions co-production with Bravo Media Productions, Magna Global Entertainment and Shapiro/Grodner Productions
$25 Million Dollar Hoax	2004	NBC	as Reveille Productions co-production with Hallock-Healey Entertainment and Krasnow Productions
Date My Mom	2004–2006	MTV	as Reveille Productions co-production with MTV Series Entertainment and Kalissa Productions
30 Days	2005–2008	FX	as Reveille Productions co-production with Warrior Poets, Bluebush Productions, Borderline TV and Actual Reality Pictures
Meet Mister Mom	2005	NBC	as Reveille Productions co-production with James Bruce Productions and Full Circle Entertainment
Ugly Betty	2006–2010	ABC	as Reveille Productions co-production with ABC Studios, Ventanarosa and Silent H Productions; Owned by Disney Platform Distribution
Identity	2006–2007	NBC	as Reveille Productions co-production with A Golder Productions and Valencia Productions Incorporated
American Gladiators	2008	NBC	as Reveille Productions co-production with Flor-Jon Films, Room 403 Productions and MGM Television
Fake Off	2013–2014	TruTV	

==== Original Media ====
Title	Network	Original running	Notes
Miami Ink	TLC	2005–2008	
LA Ink	TLC	2007–2011	
Storm Chasers	Discovery Channel	2007–2011	
The Rachel Zoe Project	Bravo	2008–2013	Co-produced by Left/Right Productions
The Philanthropist	NBC	2009	Co-produced by Levinson/Fontana Company, Carnival Films and Universal Media Studios
Be Good Johnny Weir	SundanceTV/Logo TV	2010–2012	
Dual Survival	Discovery Channel	2010–2016	
NY Ink	TLC	2011–2013	
The Horn	Red Bull TV	2016	Co-produced by Punch Drunk Pictures

=== Endemol Shine Studios ===
Title	Network	Original running	Notes
Hell on Wheels	AMC	2011–2016	co-production with Wirthwhile TV, Entertainment One, Nomadic Pictures, (Gayton²) and AMC Studios
Kingdom	Audience	2014–2017	co-production with Balasco Productions
I'm Dying Up Here	Showtime	2017–2018	co-production with Some Kind of Garden, Assembly Entertainment, Plymouth Street Productions and Showtime Networks

=== 51 Minds Entertainment ===
Title	Network	Original running	Notes
Flavor of Love	VH1	2006–2008	
I Love New York	VH1	2007–2008	
Flavor of Love Girls: Charm School	VH1	2007	
Rock of Love with Bret Michaels	VH1	2007–2009	
I Love Money	VH1	2008–2010	
From G's to Gents	MTV	2008–2009	co-production with Foxxking Entertainment
New York Goes to Hollywood	VH1	2008	
Rock of Love: Charm School	VH1	2008–2009	
Rock of Love Bus with Bret Michaels	VH1	2009	
New York Goes to Work	VH1	2009	
Charm School with Ricki Lake	VH1	2009	
Megan Wants a Millionaire	VH1	2009	
Frank the Entertainer in a Basement Affair	VH1	2010	
Brandy & Ray J: A Family Business	VH1	2010–2011	co-production with RB Productions
La La's Full Court Wedding	VH1	2010	co-production with Krossover Entertainment
Mario Lopez: Saved by the Baby	VH1	2010–2011	co-production with Via-Mar Productions and 3 Arts Entertainment
Bridalplasty	E!	2010–2011	co-production with You & I Productions
Same Name	CBS	2011	
Famous Food	VH1	2011	
La La's Full Court Life	VH1	2011–2014	
Scouted	E!	2011–2012	co-production with Madwood Studios
T.I. & Tiny: The Family Hustle	VH1	2011–2017	co-produced with Category 5 Entertainment
Marrying the Game	VH1	2012–2014	
Below Deck	Bravo	2013–present	co-production with Bravo Media Productions
Steve Austin's Broken Skull Challenge	CMT	2014–2017	co-production with Broken Skull Productions
Sisterhood of Hip Hop	Oxygen	2014–2016	
Parents Just Don't Understand	Hub Network	2014	
Tiny & Shekinah's Weave Trip	VH1	2014	co-production with Wikked Cat, Pretty Hustle Productions and Grand Hustle Productions; Owned by Paramount Media Networks
Suave Says	VH1	2014–2015	co-production with Blank Paige Productions; Owned by Paramount Media Networks
I Love Kellie Pickler	CMT	2015–2017	co-produced with Ryan Seacrest Productions; Owned by Paramount Media Networks
Below Deck Mediterranean	Bravo	2016–present	co-production with Bravo Media Productions; Owned by NBCUniversal Syndication Studios
Untitled Ricky Martin Project	VH1	2017	
The Grand Hustle	BET	2018–present	co-production with Grand Hustle Films
T.I. & Tiny: Friends & Family Hustle	VH1	2018–2020	co-production with Grand Hustle Productions, Pretty Hustle and Crossover Entertainment; Owned by Paramount Media Networks
Battle of the Fittest Couples	Paramount Network	2019	
Below Deck Sailing Yacht	Bravo	2020–present	co-production with Little Wooden Boat Productions and Bravo Media Productions; Owned by NBCUniversal Syndication Studios
The Busch Family Brewed	MTV	2020	
Below Deck Gallery Talk	Bravo	2021–present	co-production with Bravo Media Productions; Owned by NBCUniversal Syndication Studios
Cakealikes	Discovery+	2021	
Marriage or Montgage	Netflix	2021–present	
Squeaky Clean	The Roku Channel	2021–present	co-production with Shine TV
Below Deck Down Under	Peacock	2022–present	co-production with Bravo Media Productions; Owned by NBCUniversal Syndication Studios
Hack My Home	Netflix	2023	

==== Mindless Entertainment ====
Title	Network	Original running	Notes
Beat the Geeks	Comedy Central	2001–2002	co-production with Fox Television Studios
Cram	Game Show Network	2002	co-production with Jonathan Goodson Productions

=== Truly Original ===
Title	Network	Original running	Notes
Deal or No Deal	NBC/Syndication/CNBC	2005–2019	co-production with Endemol Shine North America and Entertain the Brutes
The Real Housewives of Atlanta	Bravo	2008–present	continued from True Entertainment co-production with Bravo Media Productions; Owned by NBCUniversal Syndication Studios
Swamp People	History	2010–present	continued from Original Media
Ink Master	Paramount Network/Paramount+	2012–present	continued from Original Media
Don't Be Tardy	Bravo	2012–2020	continued from True Entertainment co-production with Bravo Media Productions; Owned by NBCUniversal Syndication Studios
The Real Housewives of Potomac	Bravo	2016–present	continued from True Entertainment co-production with Bravo Media Productions; Owned by NBCUniversal Syndication Studios
Summer House	Bravo	2017–present	continued from True Entertainment co-production with Bravo Media Productions and Left Hook Media; Owned by NBCUniversal Syndication Studios
Ink Master: Angels	Paramount Network	2017–2018	
Stripped	Bravo	2017–2018	
BET's Mancave	BET	2018	co-produced with East 112th Street Productions
Winter House	Bravo	2021–present	co-production with Bravo Media Productions and Left Hook Media
Kandi & The Gang	Bravo	2022–present	co-production with Bravo Media Productions, Kandi Koated Entertainment and TTucker Productions; Owned by NBCUniversal Syndication Studios
Would I Lie to You?	The CW	2022–present	co-production with CBS Studios, King Size Productions and Fat Mama Productions
The Real Housewives of Dubai	Bravo	2022–present	co-production with Bravo Media Productions; Owned by NBCUniversal Syndication Studios

==== True Entertainment ====
Title	Years	Network	Notes
The A-List: Dallas	2011	Logo TV	
The Kandi Factory	2013	Bravo	co-production with Bravo Media Productions and Kandi Koated Entertainment; Owned by NBCUniversal
Kandi's Wedding	2014	Bravo	co-production with Bravo Media Productions and Kandi Koated Entertainment; Owned by NBCUniversal
Kandi's Ski Trip	2015	Bravo	co-production with Bravo Media Productions and Kandi Koated Entertainment; Owned by NBCUniversal

=== Zodiak USA ===
Title	Years	Network	Notes
Secret Millionaire USA	2008–2013	Fox/ABC	continued from RDF USA co-production with Rocket Science Laboratories
All Worked Up	2009–2011	TruTV	continued from RDF USA
Hardcore Pawn	2010–2015	TruTV	continued from RDF USA co-production with Richard Dominick Productions
Being Human	2011–2014	Syfy; Space	co-production with Muse Entertainment Partners
Lizard Lick Towing	2011–2014	TruTV	
Real Deal	2011	History	
Combat Pawn	2012	TruTV	
Killer Karaoke	2012–2014	TruTV	

==== RDF USA ====
Title	Years	Network	Notes
Junkyard Wars	2001–2004	TLC	
Operation Junkyard	2002–2003	Discovery Kids	
Ice-T's Rap School	2006	VH1	
The Two Coreys	2007–2008	A&E	co-production with Carlson Entertainment and Tijuana Entertainment
Hitched or Ditched	2009	The CW	co-production with Warner Horizon Television and Next Entertainment
Find My Family USA	2009	ABC	co-production with Relativity Television
One Big Happy Family	2009–2010	TLC	
The Price of Beauty	2010	VH1	

=== Authentic Entertainment ===
Title	Network	Original running	Notes
Ace of Cakes	Food Network	2006–2011	
Flipping Out	Bravo	2007–2018	co-production with Bravo Media Productions; Owned by NBCUniversal Syndication Studios
The Best Thing I Ever Ate	Food Network	2009–present	
Toddlers & Tiaras	TLC	2009–2016	
Off Limits	Travel Channel	2011–2013	
The Best Thing I Ever Made	Food Network	2011–2013	
Interior Therapy with Jeff Lewis	Bravo	2012–2013	co-production with Bravo Media Productions; Owned by NBCUniversal Syndication Studios
Cheer Perfection	TLC	2012–2013	
Here Comes Honey Boo Boo	TLC	2012–2014	
Jersey Belle	Bravo	2014	
Is Your Dog A Genius?	Nat Geo Wild	2015	

=== Bunim/Murray ===
Title	Years	Network	Notes
The Real World	1992–2019	MTV/Facebook Watch	co-production with MTV Entertainment Studios; Owned by Paramount Media Networks
Road Rules	1995–2007	MTV	co-production with MTV Entertainment Studios; Owned by Paramount Media Networks
The Challenge	1998–present	MTV	co-production with MTV Entertainment Studios; Owned by Paramount Media Networks
Love Cruise	2001	Fox	
Starting Over	2003–2006	Syndication	co-production with NBCUniversal Syndication Studios
The Simple Life	2003–2007	Fox/E!	co-production with 20th Television; Owned by Disney Platform Distribution
Bad Girls Club	2006–2017	Oxygen	co-production with Oxygen Media Productions; Owned by NBCUniversal Syndication Studios
Reunited: The Real World Las Vegas	2007	MTV	co-production with MTV Production Development; Owned by Paramount Media Networks
Bad Girls Road Trip	2007	Oxygen	co-production with Oxygen Media Productions; Owned by NBCUniversal Syndication Studios
Don't Forget the Lyrics!	2007–present	Fox/Syndication	continued from Zodiak USA co-production with Apploff Entertainment
America's Psychic Challenge	2007	Lifetime	
Keeping Up with the Kardashians	2007–2021	E!	co-production with Ryan Seacrest Productions and E! Entertainment Television; Owned by NBCUniversal Syndication Studios
Old Skool with Terry and Gita	2008	VH1	co-production with Moore/Cramer Productions; Owned by Paramount Media Networks
Kourtney and Kim Take Miami	2009–2013	E!	co-production with Ryan Seacrest Productions and E! Entertainment Television; Owned by NBCUniversal Syndication Studios
Love Games: Bad Girls Need Love Too	2010–2013	Oxygen	
Kourtney and Kim Take New York	2011–2012	E!	co-production with Ryan Seacrest Productions and E! Entertainment Television; Owned by NBCUniversal Syndication Studios
Khloé & Lamar	2011–2012	E!	co-production with Ryan Seacrest Productions and E! Entertainment Television; Owned by NBCUniversal Syndication Studios
Project Runway All Stars	2012–2019	Lifetime	co-production with The Weinstein Company Television
Total Divas	2013–2019	E!	co-production with WWE and E! Entertainment Television; Owned by NBCUniversal Syndication Studios
Under the Gunn	2014	Lifetime	co-production with The Weinstein Company Television
Valerie's Home Cooking	2015–2023	Food Network	
Born This Way	2015–2019	A&E	
Rob & Chyna	2016	E!	co-production with Ryan Seacrest Productions and E! Entertainment Television; Owned by NBCUniversal Syndication Studios
Total Bellas	2016–2021	E!	co-production with WWE and E! Entertainment Television; Owned by NBCUniversal Syndication Studios
So Cosmo	2017	E!	co-production with E! Entertainment Television; Owned by NBCUniversal Syndication Studios
Bill Nye Saves the World	2017–2018	Netflix	
The Challenge: Champs vs. Stars	2017–2018	MTV	co-production with MTV Production Development; Owned by Paramount Media Networks
Ball in the Family	2017–2020	Facebook Watch	
Miz & Mrs.	2018–2022	USA Network	co-production with WWE and USA Network Media Productions; Owned by NBCUniversal Syndication Studios
Surviving R. Kelly	2019–2023	Lifetime	co-production with Kreativ Inc.
El Mundo Real	2019	Facebook Watch	co-production with MTV Studios; Owned by Paramount Media Networks
Stranded with Sam and Colby	2019	Snapchat	
Emily's Wonder Lab	2020	Netflix	
The Real World Homecoming	2021–2022	Paramount+	co-production with MTV Entertainment Studios; Owned by Paramount Media Networks
The Challenge: All Stars	2021–present	Paramount+	co-production with MTV Entertainment Studios; Owned by Paramount Media Networks
Lizzo's Watch Out for the Big Grrrls	2022–present	Amazon Prime Video	co-production with Amazon MGM Studios and Lizzo's Bangers
The Challenge: USA	2022–2023	CBS	co-production with MTV Entertainment Studios; Owned by Paramount Media Networks
After Happily Ever After	2022–present	BET	co-production with BET Networks
The Challenge: Australia	2022	Network 10/10 Shake	Australian version of the American series of the same name
Nikki Bella Says I Do	2023–present	E!	co-production with E! Entertainment Television, Hi Mom Productions and WWE; Owned by NBCUniversal Syndication Studios
The Challenge UK	2023–present	Channel 5	co-production with VIS UK; British version of the American series of the same name.
The Family Stallone	2023–present	Paramount+	co-production with MTV Entertainment Studios

=== Stephen David Entertainment ===
Title	Network	Original running	Notes
Sons of Liberty	History	2015	co-production with A+E Studios
The Making of the Mob	AMC	2015–2016	co-production with AMC Studios
The American West	AMC	2016	co-production with Sundance Productions and AMC Studios
Roman Empire	Netflix	2016–2019	
American Playboy: The Hugh Hefner Story	Amazon Prime Video	2017	co-production with Alta Loma Entertainment
The Crystal Maze USA	Nickelodeon	2020	co-production with Nickelodeon Productions, Fizz and Bunim/Murray Productions
Human: The World Within	PBS	2021	

== Banijay UK ==
=== Bandit Television ===
Title	Years	Network	Notes
Rillington Place	2016	BBC One	co-production with BBC Studios
Delicious	2016–2019	Sky One	

=== Dragonfly ===
Title	Network	Original running	Notes
Kill It, Cook It, Eat It	BBC Three	2007–2010	
Autopsy: Emergency Room	Channel 4	2007	
Mummy Forensics	History	2008	
Tony Robinson's Crime and Punishment	Channel 4	2008	
One Born Every Minute	Channel 4	2010–2018	
The Hotel	Channel 4	2011–2015	
Bear Grylls Wild Weekends	Channel 4	2011–2013	
Raising Wild	Animal Planet	2012	
What Happens in Kavos...	Channel 4	2013	
The Borrowers: Animals Underground	BBC Two	2013	
The Great British Benefits Hideout	Channel 5	2016–2017	
Ambulance	BBC One	2016–present	
The Trial: A Murder in the Family	Channel 4	2017	
Surgeons: At The End of Life	BBC Two	2018–present	
What Makes a Murderer	Channel 4	2019	co-production with Underworld
Life and Birth	BBC One	2020	
Paramedics Britain's Lifesavers	Channel 4	2020	
The Diagnosis Detectives	BBC Two	2020	
Bear's Mission With	ITV	2021	co-production with The Natural Studios
Anni: The Honeymoon Murder	Discovery+	2021	
Teen Mum Academy	E4	2022–present	
Bradford on Duty	BBC Two	2022–present	

=== Kudos ===
Title	Years	Network	Notes
Desperately Seeking Something	1995–1998	Channel 4	
Psychos	1999	Channel 4	
Spooks	2002–2011	BBC One	
Hustle	2004–2012	BBC One	
Life on Mars	2006–2007	BBC One/BBC Four	Co-produced with BBC Wales
M.I. High	2007–2014	CBBC	
Holbyblue	2007–2008	BBC One	Co-produced with Red Planet Pictures
Nearly Famous	2007	E4	
Burn Up	2008	BBC Two; Global Television Network	Co-produced with SEVEN24 Films
Ashes to Ashes	2008–2010	BBC One	Co-produced with BBC Wales and Monastic Productions
Life on Mars	2008–2009	ABC	Co-produced with Space Floor Television, ABC Studios and 20th Century Fox Television
Plus One	2009	Channel 4	
Law & Order: UK	2009–2014	ITV	Co-produced with Wolf Films and Universal Television
Lip Service	2010–2012	BBC Three	Co-produced with BBC Scotland
Outcasts	2011	BBC One	
Death in Paradise	2011–present	BBC One; France 2	co-production with Atlantique Productions and Red Planet Pictures
Eternal Law	2012	ITV	co-production with Monastic Productions
Hunted	2012	BBC One; Cinemax	co-production with Big Light Productions
Utopia	2013–2014	Channel 4	
Mayday	2013	BBC One	
Broadchurch	2013–2017	ITV	co-production with Imaginary Friends
The Tunnel	2013–2018	Sky Atlantic; Canal+	co-production with Shine France
The Smoke	2014	Sky One	
From There to Here	2014	BBC One	
Gracepoint	2014	Fox	co-production with Shine America, South Slope Pictures and Imaginary Friends
Humans	2015–2018	Channel 4 AMC	co-production with AMC Studios
River	2015	BBC One	
Capital	2015	BBC One	
Flowers	2016	Channel 4 Seeso	
Apple Tree Yard	2017	BBC One	
Man in an Orange Shirt	2017	BBC One	
Tin Star	2017–2020	Sky Atlantic	
Troy: Fall of a City	2018	BBC One; Netflix	co-production with Wild Mercury Productions
The Bisexual	2018	Channel 4 Hulu	co-production with Hootenanny
Deep Water	2019	ITV	
Deadwater Fell	2020	Channel 4	
Utopia	2020	Amazon Prime Video	co-production with Endemol Shine North America and Amazon Studios
Code 404	2020–present	Sky One/Sky Comedy	co-production with Water & Power Productions
Two Weeks to Live	2020	Sky One	co-production with Sky Studios
SAS: Rogue Heroes	2022–present	BBC One	co-production with Nebulastar

=== The Comedy Unit ===
Title	Network	Original running	Notes
Still Game	BBC One Scotland/BBC Two/BBC One/BBC Scotland	2002–2019	co-production with Effingee Productions and BBC Scotland
Burnistoun	BBC Two Scotland/BBC One Scotland/BBC Scotland	2009–2019	
Badults	BBC Three	2013–2014	
Scot Squad	BBC One Scotland/BBC Scotland	2014–present	co-production with BBC Scotland
Soft Border Patrol	BBC One Northern Ireland	2018–present	
Tourist Trap	BBC One Wales	2018–present	
Stevens & McCarthy	BBC Scotland	2021	
Two For One	BBC Scotland	2021	

=== Douglas Road Productions ===
Title	Network	Original running	Notes
Soon Gone: A Windrush Chronicle	BBC Four	2019	
Lenny Henry's Race Through Comedy	Gold	2019	
Fierce Women	BBC iPlayer	2020	
Gospel According to Mica: The Story of Gospel Music in Six Songs	BBC Four	2020	
The Lenny Henry Show	BBC Radio 4	2020	co-production with Tiger Aspect Productions
Black Classical Music: The Forgotten History	BBC Four	2020	
Lenny Henry's Caribbean Britain	BBC Two	2022–present	

=== Bwark Productions ===
Title	Years	Network	Notes
Angelo's	2007	Channel 5	
The Inbetweeners	2008–2010	E4	co-production with Young Films
Free Agents	2009	Channel 4	co-production with Big Talk Productions
The Persuasionists	2010	BBC Two	
The Inbetweeners US	2012	MTV	co-production with Kapital Entertainment, Brad Copeland Productions and MTV Production Development
Siblings	2014–2016	BBC Three	
Fried	2015	BBC Three	co-production with Two Brothers Pictures

=== Lucky Day Productions ===
Title	Years	Network	Notes
School of Silence	2009–2012	CBBC	
Wordplay	2009	Channel 5	co-production with Group M Entertainment
Driving Academy	2011	CBBC	
Love Shaft	2012	E4	
Disaster Chefs	2013	CBBC	

=== Red House Television ===
Title	Original running	Network	Notes
Landscape Man	2010	Channel 4	
Help! My House is Falling Down	2010	Channel 4	
Cookery School	2011	Channel 4	
Best House in the Street	2012	Channel 5	
Double Your House for Half the Money	2012	Channel 4	
Brand New House for £5K	2014	Channel 5	

=== IWC Media ===
Title	Network	Original running	Notes
Location, Location, Location	Channel 4	2000–present	
Extreme Fishing with Robson Green	Channel 5	2008–2011	
The Planners Are Coming	BBC One	2008–2009	
Lost Kingdoms of Africa	BBC Four	2010–2012	
Robson's Extreme Fishing Challenge	Channel 5	2012–2014	
Lost Kingdoms of South America	BBC Four	2013	
Science of Stupid	National Geographic Channel	2014–2015	co-production with NGC Studios
Robson Green: Extreme Fisherman	Quest	2014–2021	
Lost Kingdoms of Central America	BBC Four	2014	
Wild Things	Sky One	2015–2017	co-production with Motion Content Group and Mad Monk
Britain's Most Historic Towns	Channel 4	2018–2020	
Secret Scotland with Susan Calman	Channel 5	2019–2021	co-production with Motion Content Group
Scotland's Home of the Year	BBC Scotland	2019–present	
Selling Scotland	BBC One Scotland	2019–present	
The Big Scottish Book Club	BBC Scotland	2019–2020	
Shelf Isolation	BBC Scotland	2020–present	
Boswell & Johnson's Scottish Road Trip	Sky Arts	2020	
Susan Calman's Grand Day Out	Channel 5	2021–present	co-production with Motion Content Group
Susan Calman's Grand Week By the Sea	Channel 5	2021–present	
Once Upon a True Crime	Crime & Investigation	2022–present	
The Agency: Unfiltered	BBC Scotland	2023–present	
Fortress Britain	Channel 4	2023	co-production with Brainchild Productions and Brightside Media
Outrageous Homes	Channel 4	2024–present	Took over production from Beyond Productions North

==== Wark Clements ====
Title	Years	Network	Notes
Jeopardy	2002–2004	CBBC	
The Sleepover Club	2003	Nine Network	

=== Sharp Jack TV ===
Title	Years	Network	Notes
Four Heads	2015	RTÉ One	
Darling, What Have You Done to Your Hair?	2021	E4	co-production with Initial

=== Electric Robin ===
Title	Network	Original running	Notes
Stream with Me	YouTube Premium	2020	
Comedy Central at the Edinburgh Fringe	Comedy Central	2020	
How To Be Behzinga	YouTube Premium	2020	co-production with OP Talent
Break the Record	YouTube Premium	2021–present	
Beer Masters	Amazon Prime Video	2021	
Best in the World	CBBC	2022–present	

=== The Natural Studios ===
Title	Original running	Network	Notes
Eco-Challenge	1995–2020	Discovery Channel/Amazon Prime Video	Co-produced with MGM Television and Amazon Studios
Running Wild with Bear Grylls	2014–present	NBC/National Geographic	Co-produced with Propagate Content
You vs. Wild	2019	Netflix	Co-produced with Electus
Hostile Planet	2019	National Geographic	
Bear and Jonny Wilkinskn's Wild Adventure	2021	ITV	Co-produced with Dragonfly
Bear and Nicola Adams' Wild Adventure	2021	ITV	Co-produced with Dragonfly

=== Wonder ===
Title	Network	Original running	Notes
Maddie's Do You Know?	CBeebies	2016–2021	
My Kitchen Rules UK	Channel 4	2016–2017	
Seven Year Switch UK	Channel 4	2018	
Anton Ferndiand: Football Racism and Me	BBC One	2020	co-production with New Era
Maddie, The Zoo and You	CBeebies	2020	
Maddie, Space and You	CBeebies	2021	
Maddie, The Plants and You	CBeebies	2021	
Maddie, The Home and You	CBeebies	2021	
Dementia & Us	BBC Two	2021	co-production with RDF Television

=== Mam Tor Productions ===
Title	Years	Network	Notes
Chloe	2022	BBC One; Amazon Prime Video	co-production with Amazon Studios

=== Tiger Aspect ===
Title	Years	Network	Notes
The Lenny Henry Show	1984–2005	BBC One	
Mr. Bean	1990–1995	ITV	
Life of Python	1990	BBC One; Showtime	
Harry Enfield & Chums	1990–1998	BBC One	
Root Into Europe	1992	ITV	
The Vicar of Dibley	1994–2020	BBC One	
Playing the Field	1998–2002	BBC One	
Gimme Gimme Gimme	1999–2001	BBC Two/BBC One	co-production with Hartswood Films
Let Them Eat Cake	1999	BBC One	
Harry Enfield's Brand Spanking New Show	2000	Sky One	
My Fragile Heart	2000	ITV	
Fat Friends	2000–2005	ITV	co-production with Yorkshire Television and Rollem Productions
Lenny Henry in Pieces	2000–2003	BBC One	
Teachers	2001–2004	Channel 4	
Murphy's Law	2001–2007	BBC One	
Mr. Bean: The Animated Series	2002–2019	ITV; CITV	
Family Business	2004	BBC One	
The Catherine Tate Show	2004–2007	BBC Two/BBC One	
Ross Kemp on Gangs	2004–2009	Sky One	
You've Got a Friend	2004	MTV	co-production with MTV Music & Series Development and Katalyst Films
Make Me a Supermodel	2005–2006	Channel 5	
Charlie and Lola	2005–2008	CBeebies	
Low Winter Sun	2006	Channel 4	
The Virgin Diaries	2006	MTV UK	
An Island Parish	2007–2018	BBC Two	
Benidorm	2007–2018	ITV	
The Dame Edna Treatment	2007	ITV	
Chaos at the Chateau	2007	Channel 4	
Harry & Paul	2007–2012	BBC One/BBC Two	
Paul Merton in China	2007	Channel 5	
Make Me a Supermodel USA	2008–2009	Bravo	co-production with Bravo Media Productions
Ross Kemp in Afghanistan	2008–2012	Sky One	co-production with Mongoose Productions
Summerhill	2008	CBBC	
Vanity Lair	2008	Channel 4	
New Hero of Comedy	2008	Channel 4	co-production with Shine TV and North One Television
Paul Merton in India	2008	Channel 5	
Rookies	2008–2009	A&E	co-production with Thinkfactory Media
Argumental	2008–2012	Dave	
Ross Kemp in Search of Pirates	2009	Sky One	co-production with Mongoose Productions
Undercover Dads!	2009	BBC Two; CBBC	
Red Bull Rivals	2009	Channel 4	co-production with Red Bull Media House
Britain's Best Brain	2009	Channel 5	co-production with Group M Entertainment
Catherine Tate's Nan	2009–2015	BBC One	
Paul Merton in Europe	2010	Channel 5	
Tinga Tinga Tales	2010–2012	CBeebies	co-production with Homeboyz Animation and Classic Media; Owned by DreamWorks Animation and Universal Television
The Restoration Man	2010–2017	Channel 4	
The Deep	2010	BBC One	as Tiger Aspect Scotland
Me and My Monsters	2010–2011	CBBC; Network Ten	co-production with Baker/Coogan Productions, Sticky Pictures and The Jim Henson Company
Little Crackers	2010–2012	Sky One	co-production with Sprout Pictures, Glassbox Productions, Avalon Television, Renegade Pictures, Blue Door Adventures, Can Communicate, Silver River Productions and Phil Mclntyre Television
Paul Merton's Adventures	2011	Channel 5	
Mount Pleasant	2011–2017	Sky One/Sky Living	
Public Enemies	2012	BBC One	
Psychobitches	2012–2014	Sky Arts	
Bad Education	2012–2024	BBC Three	
Ripper Street	2012–2016	BBC One/BBC Two; Amazon Prime Video	co-production with Lookout Point
My Mad Fat Diary	2013–2015	E4	co-production with Drama Republic
Peaky Blinders	2013–2022	BBC Two/BBC One	co-production with Caryn Mandabach Productions
Drunk History UK	2015–2017	Comedy Central UK	Based on the US format of the same name.
Murder in Successville	2015–2017	BBC Three	
The Good Karma Hospital	2017–2022	ITV	
Jack Whitehall: Travels with My Father	2017–2021	Netflix	co-production with Jackpot Productions
Armchair Detectives	2017	BBC One	
Man Like Mobeen	2017–present	BBC Three	
Danny and Mick	2019–2021	CBBC	
Curfew	2019	Sky One	co-production with Sky Studios and Moonage Pictures; Owned by NBCUniversal Global Distribution
The Mind of Herbert Clunderdrunk	2019–present	BBC Two	
Jack Whitehall: Christmas with My Father	2019	Netflix	
Hitmen	2020–present	Sky One/Sky Comedy	
The Other One	2020–2022	BBC One	
The Lenny Henry Show	2020	BBC Radio 4	co-production with Douglas Road Productions
Viewpoint	2021	ITV	co-production with Unstoppable Film and Television
Intergalactic	2021	Sky One	co-production with Sky Studios, Moonage Pictures and Motion Content Group; Owned by NBCUniversal Global Distribution
Please Help	2021	BBC Three	
Murderville	2022	Netflix	co-production with Electric Avenue, Abominable Pictures, Mister Krister and Artists First
Corpse Talk	2022–present	YouTube	as Tiger Aspect Kids and Family
Ralph & Katie	2022–present	BBC One	co-production with ITV Studios and Keshet Productions
Litvinenko	2022	ITVX	co-production with ITV Studios
Deep Fake Neighbour Wars	2023–present	ITVX	

=== Shiny Button Productions ===
Title	Original run	Network	Notes
Pls Like	BBC Three	2017–present	co-production with Left Bank Pictures
Action Team	ITV2	2018	
King Gary	BBC One	2018–2021	
Murder They Hope	Gold	2021–present	
The Curse	Channel 4	2022–present	

=== Definitely ===
Title	Years	Network	Notes
Million Pound Motorhomes	2021–present	Channel 5	
Million Pound Barges: Luxury Living	2021–present	Channel 5	
Hot Tub Brits: More Bubbles Please!	2021	Channel 5	
Darcey Bussell's Royal Road Trip	2022–present	More4	

=== Radar ===
Title	Network	Original running	Notes
Banzai	E4	2001–2003	
Topranko!	Channel 5	2002	
Hercules	BBC Three	2004	
Experimental	Channel 4	2004	
Favouritism	Sky One	2005	
The World's Most Extreme TV	Channel 5	2005	
Bambozzle	E4	2005	
The 50 Greatest Documentaries	Channel 4	2005	
The 50 Greatest Comedy Films	Channel 4	2006	
Cooking It	Channel 4	2006	

=== History Television International ===
Title	Original running	Network	Notes
The Queen's Castle	BBC One	2005	co-production with RDF Television
Monarchy: The Royal Family at Work	BBC One	2007	co-production with RDF Television

=== Diverse Productions ===
Title	Network	Original running	Notes
The Friday Alternative	Channel 4	1982–1983	
Diverse Reports	Channel 4	1984–1987	
The Little Picture Show	ITV	1993–1995	co-production with Carlton Television
White Tribe	Channel 4	2002	
Masters of Darkness	Channel 4	2000–2001	
Operatunity	Channel 4	2003	
Be a Grand Prix Driver	Channel 5	2003	
Soul Nation	Channel 4	2003	
Musicality	Channel 4	2003	
Forbidden Fruit	Channel 4	2003	
Beyond Boundaries	BBC Two	2005–2008	as Diverse Bristol
Man vs. Wild	Discovery Channel	2006–2011	
Codex	Channel 4	2006–2007	
Beat the Star	ITV	2008–2009	co-production with Gallowgate Productions
Tribal Wives	BBC Two	2008–2010	co-production with Goldhawk Media
Election	CBBC	2008	
Save My Holiday	BBC Two	2010	

=== Sidney Street ===
Title	Network	Original running	Notes
The Farmers Country Showdown	BBC One	2017–present	
Gok Wan's Easy Asian	Food Network; Discovery+	2020–present	
Mary Berry's Simple Comforts	BBC Two	2020	
Mary Berry: Love to Cook	BBC Two	2021–present	
Mary Berry: Cook & Share	BBC Two	2022–present	

=== Fearless Minds ===
Title	Years	Network	Notes
Soulmates	2020–present	AMC	

=== Tigress Productions ===
Title	Network	Original running	Notes
In the Wild	ITV/BBC One	1991–2001	co-production with WNET
Imitating Enemies	PBS	2000	co-production with WNET
Dambusters	Channel 4 Discovery Channel	2003	
Alone in the Wild	Channel 4 National Geographic Channel	2009	
Freddie Flintoff Goes Wild	Discovery Channel UK	2012	
Marooned with Ed Stafford	Discovery Channel	2013–2016	
Crowd Control	National Geographic Channel	2014	
Birds of Paradise: The Ultimate Quest	BBC Two	2017	
Yorkshire: A Year in the Wild	Channel 5	2017	co-production with GroupM Entertainment
Alaska: A Year in the Wild	Channel 5	2017	co-production with Motion Content Group
Dian Fossey: Secrets of the Mist	National Geographic	2017	
Canada: A Year in the Wild	Channel 5	2018	co-production with Motion Content Group

=== Workerbee TV ===
Title	Network	Original running	Notes
Geeks	E4	2013	
Ali-A's Superchargers	CBBC	2017	
Written in Blood	CBS Reality	2017–present	
Goblin Works Garage	Quest	2018–2021	
Murdertown	Crime & Investigation UK	2018–present	
Under Attack	5Spike	2018	
Elba vs. Block	Quibi	2020	co-production with Green Door Pictures
How to Build	More 4	2020–present	
The Bridge: Race to a Fortune	Channel 4 HBO Max	2020–present	
Motor Pickers	Quest	2020–present	
Goblin Works Modshop	Discovery+	2021	
Being Muslim	BBC One	2021	
Save Our Beautiful Game	Discovery+	2021	
The Real Death In Paradise	Quest Red; Discovery+	2021–present	
Janet Jackson	Sky Documentaries; Lifetime	2022	
Idris Elba's Fight School	BBC Two	2022–present	co-production with Green Door Pictures

=== RDF Television ===
Title	Network	Original running	Notes
The Crystal Maze	Channel 4/E4	1990–2020	as RDF West; co-production with Fizz
Scrapheap Challenge	Channel 4	1998–2010	
Faking It	Channel 4	2000–2006	
Wife Swap	Channel 4	2003–2009, 2017	
Full Metal Challenge	Channel 4	2003	
Holiday Showdown	ITV	2003–2009	
The Block	ITV	2004	
Ladette to Lady	ITV	2005–2010	
Rock School	Channel 4	2005–2006	
Anthea Turner: Perfect Housewife	BBC Three	2006–2007	
Dickinson's Real Deal	ITV	2006–present	as RDF West
Rosemary Shrager's School for Cooks	ITV	2007–2008	
Monarchy: The Royal Family at Work	BBC One	2007	co-production with History Television International
Star Traders	ITV	2007	
Don't Forget the Lyrics!	Sky One	2008–2009	
Only Connect	BBC Four/BBC Two	2008–present	continued from Presentable; co-production with Parasol
Instant Restaurant	BBC Two	2010	as RDF West
The Boss is Coming to Dinner	Channel 5	2010	
Secret Dealers	ITV	2010–2015	as RDF West
Sing If You Can	ITV	2011	
Peter Andre: Bad Boyfriend Club	ITV2	2012	co-production with Claire Powell Entertainment
Britain's Brightest	BBC One	2013	
Crazy Beaches	ITV2	2013	
Six Puppies and Us	BBC One	2015	
Eat Well for Less?	BBC One	2015–present	as RDF West
Shop Well for Less?	BBC One	2016–present	as RDF West
How to Spend It Well at Christmas with Phillip Schofield	ITV	2017–present	
Lodgers for Codgers	Channel 4	2020	
12 Puppies and Us	BBC Two	2020	
Craig and Bruno's Great British Road Trips	ITV	2021–present	
Dickinson's Biggest and Best Ever Deals	ITV	2021	as RDF West
Dementia & Us	BBC Two	2021	co-production with Wonder
Shop Well for the Planet?	BBC One	2021	as RDF West

==== Fizz ====
Title	Original running	Network	Notes
The Crystal Maze	Channel 4/E4	1990–2020	co-production with RDF West
Shipwrecked	Channel 4/E4	1999–2019	continued from RDF Television co-production with Motion Content Group
Tipping Point	ITV	2012–present	continued from RDF Television
Humble Pie	W	2015	
Grossbusters	MTV	2016	
Undressed	TLC	2016	
Sing: Ultimate A Capella	Sky One	2017	
The Crystal Maze USA	Nickelodeon	2020	co-production with Stephen David Entertainment and Bunim/Murray Productions
Fight Dirty	BBC Three	2020	co-production with Nice One Productions
Lightning	BBC Two	2021–2022	co-production with Nice One Productions

=== Bullseye Television ===
Title	Network	Original running	Notes
World of Pain	Bravo	2004–2005	
Cops Uncut	TruTV	2006–2007	
The Witch Doctor Will See You Now	National Geographic UK	2011	
Gadget Geeks	Sky One	2012	

=== Endemol UK Productions ===
Title	Network	Original running	Notes
Chained	E4	2001–2002	
Swapheads	Channel 5	2002	
International King of Sports	Channel 5	2002–2004	
Judgement Day	ITV	2003	
Beat the Nation	Channel 4	2004	as Endemol UK Productions Midlands
24 Hour Quiz	ITV	2004	
Memory Bank	Channel 5	2004	as Endemol UK Productions Midlands
Fool Around With	E4/Channel 4	2004–2005	as Endemol UK Productions West
The Farm	Channel 5	2004–2005	
Art School	BBC Two	2005	as Endemol UK Productions West
Hot Tub Ranking	Channel 5	2005	
Mighty Truck of Stuff	CBBC	2005–2006	
Only Fools on Horses	BBC One/BBC Three	2006	
Extinct	ITV	2006	

=== Presentable ===
Title	Network	Original running	Notes
Late Night Poker	Channel 4	1998–2011	
The Lyrics Game	BBC One Wales	2003	
Celebrity Poker Club	Challenge	2003–2005	
All Star Poker Challenge	ITV	2005	
Late Night Poker Ace	Channel 4	2005	
Late Night Poker Masters	Channel 4	2007	
High Tackle	BBC One Wales	2009	
The Renovation Game	Channel 4	2011–2012	

=== Artists Studio ===
Title	Years	Network	Notes
The Fall	2013–2016	BBC Two; RTÉ One (Ireland); ZDFneo (Germany)	co-production with ZDF Enterprises and Fables Limited
Bang	2017–2020	S4C	co-production with Joio TV

=== OP Talent ===
Title	Network	Original running	Notes
DanTDM On Tour	BBC Two	2017	co-production with Live Nation Entertainment
How to Be Behzinga	YouTube Premium	2020	co-production with Electric Robin

=== Castaway Television Productions ===
Title	Years	Network	Notes
Survivor	2000–present	CBS	co-production with CBS Studios, MGM Television and Survivor Productions LLC
Australian Survivor	2002–present	Nine Network/Seven Network/Network 10	co-production with Endemol Shine Australia

=== Darlow Smithson Productions ===
Title	Network	Original running	Notes
Seconds from Disaster	National Geographic	2004–2018	
I Shouldn't Be Alive	Discovery Channel/Animal Planet	2005–2013	
Ancient Megastructures	National Geographic Channel; History Television	2007	co-production with Parallax Film Productions
Richard Hammond's Engineering Connections	National Geographic Channel/BBC Two	2008–2011	
The Diary of Anne Frank	BBC One	2009	
Into the Universe with Stephen Hawking	Discovery Channel	2010	
Curiosity	Discovery Channel	2011–2013	co-production with Edge West Productions
Nazi Megastructures	National Geographic UK	2013–2020	
24 Hours in the Past	BBC One	2015	
Weather Terror	Channel 5 BBC Earth	2015	
The Yorkshire Steam Railway: All Aboard	Channel 5	2018–2020	
The Fitting Room	RTÉ Two	2019	
Interior Design Masters with Alan Carr	BBC Two/Netflix; BBC One	2019–present	
Made In A Day	National Geographic UK	2020	
In Cold Blood	ITV	2020	
A Year on the Yorkshire Steam Railways	Channel 5	2020	
The Great Smog: Winter of '52	Channel 5	2022	

=== Shine TV ===
Title	Network	Original running	Notes
MasterChef	BBC One/BBC Two	1990–present	continued from Union 175; co-production with Ziji Productions
Junior MasterChef	BBC One/CBBC	1994–2014	continued from Union Pictures; co-production with Ziji Productions
Changing Rooms	BBC One/BBC Two/Channel 4	1996–present	continued from Endemol UK Productions
Hex	Sky One	2004–2005	co-production with Sony Pictures Television International
Sugar Rush	Channel 4	2005–2006	
Build a New Life in the Country	Channel 5	2005–2010	
The Biggest Loser	LivingTV; ITV	2005–2012	
Project Catwalk	Sky One	2006	
Celebrity MasterChef	BBC One/BBC Two	2006–present	co-production with Ziji Productions
Classical Star	BBC Two	2007	
New Hero of Comedy	Channel 4	2008	co-production with North One Television and Tiger Aspect Productions
Gladiators	Sky One	2008–2009	
Battle of the Brains	BBC Two	2008–2009	co-production with BBC Manchester
MasterChef: The Professionals	BBC Two/BBC One	2008–present	co-production with Ziji Productions
The What in the World? Quiz	Channel 5	2008–2008	
Merlin	BBC One	2008–2012	
Demons	ITV	2009	
As Seen On TV	BBC One	2009	
Got to Dance	Sky One	2009–2014	co-production with Princess Productions
The Naked Office	Virgin 1	2010–2011	
My Genius Idea	BBC One	2010	
Britain's Best Bakery	ITV	2012–2014	
The Island with Bear Grylls	Channel 4	2014–present	co-production with The Natural Studios
The Box	BBC One	2015	
The Force	Sky One	2015–2017	
Hunted	Channel 4	2015–present	
Celebrity Island with Bear Grylls	Channel 4	2016–present	co-production with The Natural Studios
Mary Berry's Country House Secrets	BBC One	2017	
The Heist	Sky One	2018–2020	
The Write Offs	Channel 4	2020	
Rick Stein's Cornwall	BBC Two	2021–present	co-production with Rick Stein Productions
Squeaky Clean	The Roku Channel	2021–present	Co-produced with 51 Minds Entertainment

=== Initial ===
Title	Network	Original running	Notes
Trivial Pursuit	BBC One/The Family Channel	1990–1994	Continued by Action Time
No Sweat	CBBC	1997–1998	
Comin' Atcha!	CITV	1998–2000	
Miami 7	CBBC	1999	
L.A. 7	CBBC	2000	
Bullionaire	Channel 5	2000	
Big Brother	Channel 4/Channel 5/ITV2	2000–present	continued from Remarkable Television
Celebrity Big Brother	Channel 4/Channel 5	2001–2018	continued from Remarkable Television
Shafted	ITV	2001	
Number One	Channel 4	2001	
Fame Academy	BBC One/BBC Three	2002–2003	
X-periMENTAL	BBC One	2003–2004	as Initial Kids
Comic Relief Does Fame Academy	BBC One/BBC Three/CBBC Channel	2003–2007	
The Games	Channel 4/ITV	2003–present	as Initial West
Orange Playlist	ITV	2004–2007	
The Match	Sky One	2004–2008	
Totally Frank	Channel 4	2005–2006	
Bel's Boys	CITV	2006	
Soccer Aid	ITV/Virgin Media Sport	2006–present	
1 vs. 100	BBC One	2006–2009	
In the Grid	Channel 5	2006–2007	
Golden Balls	ITV	2007–2009	
The One and Only	BBC One	2008	
The Kids Are All Right	BBC One	2008	co-production with BBC Scotland
Hot Rods	CBBC	2008	as Initial Scotland
CelebAir	ITV2	2008	co-production with Zeppotron
Spin Star	ITV	2008	as Initial West
Total Wipeout	BBC One	2009–2012	
Paradise Café	CBBC; TVNZ 2	2009–2011	co-production with Gibson Group
Guesstimation	BBC One	2009	co-production with Talpa
I Can Cook	CBeebies	2009–2012	
Football's Next Star	Sky One	2010	
The Whole 19 Yards	ITV	2010	
101 Ways to Leave a Gameshow	BBC One	2010	
Winter Wipeout	BBC One	2011–2012	
Jedward's Big Adventure	CBBC	2012–2014	
Your Face Sounds Familiar	ITV	2013	
Prize Island	ITV	2013	
The Singer Takes It All	Channel 4	2014	co-production with Remarkable Television
Big Box Little Box	ITV	2015	
The Almost Impossible Gameshow	ITV2	2015–2016	
Up Late with Rylan	Channel 5	2016	
Tenable	ITV	2016–2024	
The Royal World	MTV UK	2018	
Total Wipeout: Freddie and Patty Takeover	BBC One	2020	
Darling, What Have You Done to Your Hair?	E4	2021	co-production with Sharp Jack TV
The Singles' Table	ITVBe	2022–present	

=== Dangerous Films ===
Title	Years	Network	Notes
The Story of God	2005	BBC Two	
Human Body: Pushing the Limits	2008	Discovery Channel	

=== Remarkable Entertainment ===
Title	Network	Original running	Notes
Ready Steady Cook	BBC Two/BBC One	1994–2021	continued from Cheetah Television
Animal Park	BBC One/BBC Two	2000–present	continued from Brighter Pictures
Deal or No Deal	Channel 4/ITV1	2005–2016; 2023–present	continued from Cheetah Television West
Supersize vs Superskinny	Channel 4	2008–2014	continued from Cheetah Television
Snog Marry Avoid?	BBC Three	2008–2013	continued from Cheetah Television
The Sex Education Show	Channel 4	2008–2011	continued from Cheetah Television
Divided	ITV	2009–2010	continued from Brighter Pictures; co-production with Talpa
Pointless	BBC Two/BBC One	2009–present	continued from Brighter Pictures
Hotter Than My Daughter	BBC Three	2010–2011	
The £100K Drop	Channel 4	2010–2019	
Restoration Home	BBC Two	2011–2013	
The Bank Job	Channel 4	2012	
Secret Eaters	Channel 4	2012–2014	
The Common Denominator	Channel 4	2013	
The House That £100k Built	BBC Two	2013–2017	
Bodyshockers	Channel 4	2014–2016	
Ejector Seat	ITV	2014	
The Singer Takes It All	Channel 4	2014	co-production with Initial
Two Tribes	BBC Two	2014–2015	
The Big Spell	Sky One	2017	
House of Games	BBC Two	2017–present	
All Together Now	BBC One	2018–2019	
Your Home Made Perfect	BBC Two	2019–2023	
The Wall	BBC One	2019–2022	co-production with Glassman Media and SpringHill Company
Virtually History: The Berlin Wall	YouTube Premium	2019	
Your Garden Made Perfect	BBC Two	2021	
Starstruck	ITV	2022–2023	
The Chernobyl Disaster	Channel 5	2022	
Ben Fogle's Lost Worlds	Channel 5	2022	
The Big Interiors Battle	Channel 4	2023	
Survivor	BBC One	2023	
Genius Game	ITV	2025–present	
Building the Band	Netflix	2025	

=== Blacklight Television ===
Title	Network	Original running	Notes
Coming Up	Channel 4	2003–2013	co-production with IWC Media
NY-LON	Channel 4	2004	
Rocket Man	BBC One	2005	
City of Vice	Channel 4	2008	
Being Human	BBC Three	2008–2013	
Cara Fi	S4C	2014	as Touchpaper Wales
Charlie	RTÉ One	2015	co-production with Element Pictures
Tatau	BBC Three	2015	co-production with South Pacific Pictures
Rebellion	RTÉ One	2016	co-production with Zodiak Media Ireland, Element Pictures and SundanceTV
Murder	BBC Two	2016	
On the Edge	Channel 4	2018–2021	
Resistance	RTÉ One	2019	co-production with Zodiak Media Ireland
Close to Me	Channel 4	2021	

=== Cheetah Television ===
Title	Network	Original running	Notes
BrainTeaser	Channel 5	2002–2007	as Endemol West/Cheetah Television West; continued from Endemol UK Productions Midlands
Restoration	BBC Two	2003–2009	continued from Endemol UK Productions
The Perfect Village	BBC Four	2006	
Step Up To The Plate	BBC One	2008–2009	

=== Zodiak Media Ireland ===
Title	Network	Original running	Notes
Rebellion	RTÉ One	2016	co-production with Touchpaper Television, Element Pictures and SundanceTV
Resistance	RTÉ One	2019	co-production with Touchpaper Television

=== Brighter Pictures ===
Title	Network	Original running	Notes
Naked Elvis	Channel 4	1999	
Get Your Kit Off	Channel 4	2001	
Cruel Summer	Trouble	2002–2003	
Undercover Lovers	Trouble	2002	
Wudja Cudja	ITV2	2002	
Love Match UK	ITV	2003	
Chantelle: Living the Dream	E4	2006	
Princess Nikki	E4	2006	
The All Star Talent Show	Channel 5	2006	
Celebrity Scissorhands	BBC Three	2006–2008	

=== Fifty Fathoms ===
Title	Network	Original running	Notes
Fortitude	Sky Atlantic	2015–2018	co-production with Tiger Aspect Productions
The A Word	BBC One	2016–present	co-production with Keshet Productions
Guerrilla	Showtime; Sky Atlantic	2017	co-production with ABC Signature Studios, Green Door Pictures and Stearns Castle
The Eddy	Netflix	2020	co-production with Atlantique Productions, Endeavor Content, Argury, Boku Films and One Shoe Films
Adult Material	Channel 4	2020	
Domina	Sky Atlantic	2021–present	co-production with Sky Studios

=== Zeppotron ===
Title	Network	Original running	Notes
Unnovations	Play UK	2001–2002	
The People's Book of Records	Channel 4	2003	
FAQ U	Channel 4	2005	as Zeppotron West
8 Out of 10 Cats	Channel 4/More4/E4	2005–2021	
Space Cadets	Channel 4	2005	
Charlie Brooker's Wipe	BBC Four, BBC Two	2006–2020	
The Law of the Playground	Channel 4	2006–2008	
Would I Lie to You?	BBC One	2007–present	
The Wall	BBC Three	2008	
CelebAir	ITV2	2008	co-production with Initial
Dead Set	E4	2008	
Winging It	BBC Two	2009	
You Have Been Watching	Channel 4	2009–2010	
So Wrong It's Right	BBC Radio 4	2010–2012	
Odd One In	ITV	2010–2011	
10 O'Clock Live	Channel 4	2011–2013	
How TV Ruined Your Life	BBC Two	2011	
The Marriage Ref	ITV	2011	
A Touch of Cloth	Sky One	2012–2014	
8 Out of 10 Cats Does Countdown	Channel 4	2012–present	co-production with ITV Studios
Let's Play Darts	BBC Two	2015–2016	
Best Behaviour	BBC Radio 4/BBC Radio 7	2015–present	
Late Night Mash	BBC Two/Dave	2017–present	
Frankie Boyle's New World Order	BBC Two	2017–present	
The Ranganation	BBC Two	2019–present	
First & Last	BBC One	2020–present	
One Night In...	Channel 4	2020–present	
Along for the Ride with David O'Doherty	Channel 4	2021–present	

== Banijay Australia and New Zealand ==
=== Screentime ===
Programs with a shaded background indicate the program is still in production.

Title	Network	Years	Notes	Genre
Breakers	Network Ten	1998–1999	Co-production with Chrysalis Distribution	Scripted
Ten 7 Aotearoa	TVNZ 2	2002–2023		Unscripted
MDA	ABC	2002–2005		Scripted
Ghost Hunt	TVNZ	2005–2006	Co-production with Osiris Productions	Unscripted
Yasmin's Getting Married	Network Ten	2006		Unscripted
Underbelly	Nine Network	2008–2013, 2018, 2022		Scripted
Dragons' Den	RTÉ One	2009		Unscripted
RBT	Nine Network	2010–present		Unscripted
Bloodlines	TVNZ	2010		Scripted
Annabel Langbein: The Free Range Cook	TVNZ 1	2010–2014	Co-production with FremantleMedia and Annabel Langbein Media	Unscripted
MasterChef Ireland	RTÉ Two	2011		Unscripted
Tim Winton's Cloudstreet	Showcase	2011		Scripted
Crownies	ABC	2011		Scripted
Underbelly NZ: Land of the Long Green Cloud	Three	2011		Scripted
Tricky Business	Nine Network	2012		Scripted
Safe House	TVNZ	2012		Scripted
Animal Files	Prime	2013		Unscripted
Water Patrol	TVNZ	2013		Unscripted
Outback Coroner	Crime + Investigation	2013–2014		Unscripted
ANZAC Girls	ABC	2014		Scripted
Janet King	ABC	2014–2017	Spin-off of Crownies	Scripted
Village Vets Australia	Lifestyle	2014–2015		Unscripted
Outback ER	ABC	2015		Unscripted
I Am Innocent	TVNZ 1	2015–2017		Unscripted
How Not to Behave	ABC	2015		Scripted
Stop Laughing...This Is Serious	ABC	2015		Unscripted
Anh's Brush with Fame	ABC	2016–present		Unscripted
You're Back in the Room	TVNZ 2	2016		Unscripted
The Secret Daughter	Seven Network	2016–2017		Scripted
Wolf Creek	Stan	2016–2017	Co-production with Emu Creek Productions	Scripted
Undressed	SBS	2017		Unscripted
Murder Calls Australia	Nine Network	2017		Scripted
Testing Teachers	SBS	2017		Unscripted
Pine Gap	ABC; Netflix	2018		Scripted
Date Night	Nine Network	2018		Unscripted
Straight Forward	Viaplay; TVNZ	2018	Co-production with Mastiff Denmark, Viaplay, TVNZ and Acorn TV	Scripted
Hughesy, We Have a Problem	Network Ten	2018–2021		Unscripted
Playing for Keeps	Network Ten	2018—2019		Scripted
Driving Test Australia	Nine Network	2018		Unscripted
Eat Well for Less Australia	Nine Network	2018		Unscripted
Orange Is the New Brown	Seven Network	2018		Unscripted
The Secret Life of 4 Year Olds	Network Ten	2018		Unscripted
Trial By Kyle	Network Ten	2019		Unscripted
Quimbo's Quest	Network Ten	2019		Scripted
Wife Swap New Zealand	TVNZ	2019		Unscripted
The Gulf	Three; ZDF	2019–present	Co-production with Lippy Pictures and Letterbox Filmproduktion	Scripted
Wife Swap Australia	Seven Network	2019, 2021	Previous season produced by Shine Australia	Unscripted
Informer 3838	Nine Network	2020–present		Scripted
SAS Australia	Seven Network	2020–present		Unscripted
The Hundred with Andy Lee	Nine Network	2021–present		Unscripted
Bali 2002	Stan	2022	Co-production with Endemol Shine Australia	Scripted
The Claremont Murders	Seven Network	2023	Co-production with See Pictures	Scripted

=== Endemol Shine Australia ===
Program is still in production.

Title	Network	Years	Notes
Junior MasterChef Australia	Network Ten	2010–2011; 2020–present	
The Boss Is Coming to Dinner	Nine Network	2010	
Letters and Numbers	SBS	2010–2012	
The Biggest Loser	Network Ten	2011–2017	Prior seasons produced by FremantleMedia Australia (2006–2010)
Australia's Next Top Model	Fox8	2011–2016	Prior seasons produced by Granada Media Australia (2005–2010)
The Shire	Network Ten	2012	
The Voice Australia	Nine Network	2012–2016	Subsequent seasons are produced by ITV Studios Australia
MasterChef Australia	Network Ten	2012–present	Prior seasons produced by FremantleMedia Australia (2009–2011)
Wife Swap Australia	LifeStyle You	2012	Subsequent seasons produced by Screentime
Location Location Location Australia	Lifestyle Channel; Network Ten	2012–2014, 2023	
MasterChef Australia All Stars	Network Ten	2012	
Beauty and the Geek Australia	Seven Network; Nine Network	2012–2014, 2021–2022	Prior seasons produced by Southern Star Group (2010–2011) and Endemol Southern Star (2009)
SlideShow	Seven Network	2013	
Embarrassing Bodies Down Under	LifeStyle You	2013	
MasterChef Australia: The Professionals	Network Ten	2013	
Aussie Pickers	A&E	2013–2014	
The Bachelor Australia	Network Ten	2013–2015	Subsequent seasons produced by Warner Bros. International Television Production
The Voice: Kids	Nine Network	2014	
So You Think You Can Dance Australia	Network Ten	2014	Prior seasons produced by FremantleMedia Australia (2008–2010)
INXS: Never Tear Us Apart	Seven Network	2014	Telemovie
Living with the Enemy	SBS	2014	
The Face	Fox8	2014	
Catching Milat	Seven Network	2015	Limited series
The Beautiful Lie	ABC	2015	
The Great Australian Spelling Bee	Network Ten; Eleven	2015–2016	
Shark Tank Australia	Network Ten	2015–2018	Subsequent seasons produced by Curio Pictures
Gogglebox Australia	Lifestyle Channel; Network Ten	2015–present	
Offspring	Network Ten	2016–2017	Prior seasons produced by Endemol Australia (2010–2014)
Brock	Network Ten	2016	Limited series
The Big Music Quiz	Seven Network	2016	
Australian Survivor	Network Ten	2016–present	Prior seasons produced by other production companies. In association with Castaway Television Productions
Married at First Sight Australia	Nine Network	2016–present	Previous season produced by Nine Network
Blue Murder: Killer Cop	Seven Network	2017	
Wake in Fright	Network Ten	2017	Co-produced with Lingo Pictures
Sisters	Network Ten	2017	
Look Me in the Eye	SBS	2017	
The Wall	Seven Network	2017	
Family Food Fight	Nine Network	2017–2018	
Australian Ninja Warrior	Nine Network; Network Ten	2017–2022; 2027–present	
Pointless	Network Ten	2018–2019	
Ambulance Australia	Network Ten	2018–present	
Changing Rooms	Network Ten	2019	Prior seasons before the revival, from 1998 to 2005, were produced by other production companies.
One Born Every Minute Australia	Network Ten	2019	
Old People's Home for 4 Year Olds	ABC	2019–present	
Lego Masters	Nine Network	2019–present	
Big Brother	Seven Network; Network Ten	2020–present	Co-production with Seven Studios. Prior seasons before the revival, seasons were produced by Endemol Shine's predecessors Endemol Southern Star (2001–2008) and Endemol Australia (2012–2014)
Ultimate Tag	Seven Network	2021	
RFDS	Seven Network	2021–present	
Hunted Australia	Network Ten	2022–2023	
Echoes	Netflix	2022	co-production with That Kid Ed Productions
Bali 2002	Stan	2022	co-production with Screentime
Love Triangle	Stan	2022–2025	
Would I Lie to You? Australia	Network Ten	2022–2023	
The Traitors	Network Ten	2022–2023	Subsequent seasons produced by South Pacific Pictures
Old People's Home for Teenagers	ABC	2022–2023	
The Hundred with Andy Lee	Nine Network	2022–present	Previous season produced by Screentime. Format based on a concept by Screentime.
Blow Up	Seven Network	2023	
Rush	Nine Network	2023	co-production with Nine Network
The Summit	Nine Network	2023–2024	
Dessert Masters	Network Ten	2023–2024	
NCIS: Sydney	Paramount+ Australia	2023–present	
Gordon Ramsay's Food Stars	Nine Network	2024	co-production with Studio Ramsay Global
Ready Steady Cook	Network Ten	2024	Prior seasons produced by Endemol Southern Star (2005–2009) and Southern Star Group (2009–2013)
Dream Home	Seven Network	2024	
Stranded on Honeymoon Island	Seven Network	2024	
Headliners	ABC	2024	
RBT	Nine Network	2024–present	Prior seasons produced by Screentime
Tipping Point Australia	Nine Network	2024–present	
Deal or No Deal	Network Ten	2024–present	Prior seasons produced by Endemol Southern Star (2003–2009) and Southern Star Group (2009–2013)
Shaun Micallef's Origin Odyssey	SBS	2024–present	
Shaking Down the Thunder	Seven Network	2025	Docu-series
No Holds Barred: The GWS Giants	Seven Network	2025	Docu-series
Portrait Artist of the Year	ABC	2025–present	
My Reno Rules	Seven Network	2026–present	
MAFS: After the Dinner Party	Stan	2026–present	
Race Around the World	ABC	2026–present	Prior seasons produced by ABC TV

==== Endemol Australia ====
Title	Network	Years	Notes
The Adventures of Sam	ABC TV	1999	as Southern Star Entertainment; co‑produced with the Australian Film Finance Corporation
Y?	Nine Network	1999–2002	as Southern Star Entertainment and Southern Star Endemol
Big Brother	Network Ten/Nine Network	2001–2014	as Endemol Southern Star and Southern Star Entertainment
Shaffed	Nine Network	2002	as Southern Star Endemol
Deal or No Deal	Seven Network	2003–2009	as Endemol Southern Star and Southern Star Entertainment
Ready Steady Cook	Network Ten	2005–2013	as Endemol Southern Star and Southern Star Entertainment
The Adventures of Bottle Top Bill and His Best Friend Corky	ABC2	2005–2009	as Southern Star Entertainment
1 vs. 100	Nine Network	2007–2008	as Endemol Southern Star
Gladiators	Seven Network	2008	as Endemol Southern Star
Out of the Blue	BBC One/BBC Two	2008–2009	as Southern Star Entertainment
Hi-5 (Series 10–13)	Nine Network	2008–2012	as Southern Star Entertainment
Wipeout Australia	Nine Network	2009	as Endemol Southern Star
Beauty and the Geek Australia	Seven Network	2009–2011	as Endemol Southern Star and Southern Star Entertainment; Subsequent seasons produced by Endemol Shine Australia
Offspring	Network Ten	2010–2014	Subsequent seasons produced by Endemol Shine Australia
Bananas in Pyjamas	ABC2	2011–2013	as Southern Star Entertainment

=== Beyond International ===
Title	Years	Network	Notes
Beyond Tomorrow	1981–2006	ABC/Seven Network/Network 10	
Chances	1991–1992	Nine Network	
Fire	1995–1996	Seven Network	
Good Guys, Bad Guys	1997–1998	Nine Network	
Something in the Air	2000–2002	ABC TV	as Beyond Simpson Le Mesurier
MythBusters	2003–2018	Discovery Channel/Science Channel	
Deadly Women	2005–present	Investigation Discovery	
Prototype This!	2008–2009	Discovery Channel	
Toybox	2010–2014	Seven Network/7two	
Pipsqueaks	2013–2014	7two	as Beyond Screen Production
Wild But True	2015	Discovery Kids	
My Lottery Dream Home	2015–present	HGTV	as Beyond Media Rights
Peter Allen: Not the Boy Next Door	2015	Seven Network	
Beat Bugs	2016–2018	7two Netflix	as Beyond Entertainment co-production with Grace: A Storytelling Company, Thunderbird Entertainment (seasons 1–2), Sony/ATV Music Publishing and Atomic Cartoons (seasons 1–2)
Motown Magic	2018	7two Netflix	as Beyond Entertainment co-production with Grace: A Storytelling Company, PolyGram Entertainment, Sony/ATV Music Publishing and EMI Music Publishing
Dumbotz	2019	9Go!	as Beyond Entertainment co-production with Blue Rocket Productions
Halifax: Retribution	2020	Nine Network	as Beyond Lone Hand
My Lottery Dream Home	2021	HGTV	as Beyond Media Rights
Pooch Perfect US	2021	ABC	
Wow! That's Amazing UK	2022	CBBC	as Beyond Productions North
Back in the Groove	2022	Hulu	as Beyond Media Rights co-production with Walt Disney Television Alternative

== Endemol Shine Turkey ==
Title	Original running	Network	Notes
Broken Pieces	2014–2017	Star TV	
Intersection	2016	Fox	
Evlat Kokusu	2016	Canal D	
Big Brother Türkiye	2016	Star TV	

== Kuarzo Endemol Shine Group Argentina ==
Title	Original running	Network	Notes
Big Brother Argentina	2001–2016	Telefe	
Los 8 escalones	2014	eltrece	
El Gran Juego De La Oca	2022	eltrece	
Los 8 Escalones Del Millón	2021–2023	eltrece	
Bienvenidos A Bordo	2020–2022	eltrece	
Tres Paso Y Una Ayuda	2019	eltrece	
Lo Mejor De La Familia	2017	eltrece	
Otra Noche Familiar	2019	eltrece	
Dar La Nota	2015	eltrece	
La Tribuna De Guido	2018	eltrece	
Talento FOX	2016	Fox	
Nosotros A La Mañana	2016–2022	eltrece	
A La Barbarossa	2022	Telefe	
Flor De Equipo	2020–2022	Telefe	
Las Puertas	2017	eltrece	
Lo Que Das	2016	eltrece	
La Mejor Elección	2016	eltrece	
Hacelo Felíz	2017	eltrece	
Cortá Por Lozano	2017–2022	Telefe	
El Último Pasajero	2007–2009, 2022	Telefe	
Bariló, A Todo O Nada	2011–2012	eltrece	
A Todo O Nada	2013–2014	eltrece	
Los Perros De Guido	2017	eltrece	
El Perro Del Millón	2019	eltrece	

=== Banijay format ===
Title	Original running	Network	Produced by
All Together Now	2022	eltrece	LaFlia Contenidos
MasterChef Celebrity Argentina 1	2020	Telefe	BoxFish TV (BxFsh TV)
MasterChef Celebrity Argentina 2	2021	Telefe	BoxFish TV (BxFsh TV)
MasterChef Celebrity Argentina 3	2021–2022	Telefe	BoxFish TV (BxFsh TV)
MasterChef Celebrity Argentina (La Revancha)	2022	Telefe	BoxFish TV (BxFsh TV)

== Banijay Kids & Family ==
Title	Network	Original running	Notes
Lost in Oz	Amazon Prime Video; Discovery Kids	2015–2018	international distribution produced by Bureau of Magic and Amazon Studios
Super Agent Jon Le Bon	CBC Kids	2018–present	international distribution produced by Happy Camper Media
Moominvalley	Yle TV2; Yle Teema & Fem; Sky One; Sky Max	2019–2024	international distribution produced by Gutsy Animations
Untitled Totally Spies! live-action series	Amazon Prime Video	TBA	co-production with Gloria Sanchez Productions and Amazon MGM Studios
Big Barn Farm (revival)	BBC iPlayer	TBA	

=== Zodiak Kids & Family France ===
Title	Network	Original running	Notes
The Intrepids	Canal J France 3	1993–1996	co-production with CINAR
Extrême limite	TF1	1994–1999	
Teen's Confessions	TF1; TV Cultura	1994–1996	
The Mozart Band	TVE2	1995	co-production with BRB Internacional and Televisión Española and with animation by Wang Film Productions
My Best Holidays	TF1	1996	
Sous le soleil	TF1	1996–2008	
Kassai and Luk	France 2	1997	co-production with Les Films D'Horizon, Lacewood Productions and Hahn Shin
The Secret World of Santa Claus	France 3	1997	co-production with CinéGroupe
Mythic Warriors	CBS; Scottish Television	1998–2000	co-production with Nelvana, Scottish Television Enterprises and Hong Guang Animation
Marsupilami	Canal J France 3	2000–2012	co-production with Marsu Productions, Motion International (season 1), Koaa Film (season 1) and Merchandising München GmbH (season 2) seasons 1–2 only continued by Samka Productions for seasons 3–5
Totally Spies!	TF1/Gulli; Teletoon/Télétoon	2001–present	co-production with Merchandising München GmbH (seasons 1–2), Image Entertainment Corporation (seasons 3–5), Marathon Images (season 6) and Ollenom Studio (season 7)
Mission Odyssey	M6	2002–2003	co-production with BAF Berlin Animation Film and GmbH & Co. Produktions KG
Martin Mystery	Canal J YTV	2003–2006	co-production with Image Entertainment Corporation
15/Love	YTV	2004–2006	
Dolmen	TF1	2005	
Team Galaxy	France 3 YTV; Jetix; Rai 2	2006–2008	co-production with Image Entertainment Corporation
Monster Buster Club	TF1; Jetix; YTV	2007–2009	co-production with Image Entertainment Corporation
Famous 5: On the Case	France 3 Disney Channel	2008	co-production with Chorion
Gormiti	Italia 1 Boing; Canal J	2008–2011	co-production with Giochi Preziosi and Mediaset
The Amazing Spiez!	TF1; Canal J Teletoon	2009–2012	co-production with Image Entertainment Corporation
Rekkit Rabbit	TF1; Disney XD	2011–2013	co-production with Zodiak Kids (seasons 2-3)
Redakai: Conquer the Kairu	Canal J YTV	2011–2013	co-production with Spin Master Entertainment
Sous le soleil de Saint-Tropez	TMC	2013–2014	
LoliRock	France 3 Disney Channel	2014–2017	co-production with Zodiak Kids, MFP, B Media 2012 (season 2) and Backup Films (season 2)
Get Blake!	Gulli; Nickelodeon	2015	co-production with Zodiak Kids
Magiki	Gulli; Super!	2017	co-production with De Agostini, Planeta and Animasia
Lilybuds	TiJi; Discovery Kids	2018	
Mumfie	Okoo; Rai Yoyo	2022	co-production with Animoka Studio
Street Football	France Télévisions; Canal J	2022–present	co-production with Monello Productions, Maga Animation Studio and Rai Ragazzi season 4 continued from Tele Images Kids
The Unstoppable Yellow Yeti	Yle Areena; Disney Channel; Disney+	2022	co-production with Gigglebug Entertainment and Yleisradio
Shasha & Milo	EBS; Tencent Video; Discovery Kids	2023–present	co-production with Pingo Entertainment
Miniheroes of the Forest	France Télévisions; RAI	2023–present	co-production with MoBo Productions and Movimenti Production
Super Happy Magic Forest	BBC; RAI	2024–present	co-production with Monello Productions, Movimenti Production and Tiger Aspect Kids & Family
Piripenguins	CBeebies; RAI	2025–present	co-production with Eaglet Films animated by Wild Child Animation and Red Monk Studio
Aquila & The Medieval Misfits	Canal+ ITVX; NDR; RTBF	TBA	co-production with Tiger Aspect Kids & Family

=== Zodiak Kids & Family Productions UK ===
Title	Network	Original running	Notes
Finger Tips	CITV	2001–2008	
The Basil Brush Show	CBBC	2002–2007	co-production with Entertainment Rights
Tricky TV	CITV	2005–2010	
Mister Maker	CBeebies	2007–2009	continued from RDF Television
Dani's House	CBBC	2008–2012	as The Foundation Scotland
Waybuloo	CBeebies; Treehouse TV	2009–2012	co-production with DHX Media
Planet Ajay	CBBC	2009	
Tickety Toc	Nick Jr. EBS 1	2012–2015	co-production with FunnyFlux Entertainment, CJ E&M and High1 Entertainment
Let's Play	CBeebies	2012–2015	
Scrambled!	CITV	2014–2021	
Zack & Quack	Nick Jr.	2014–2017	co-production with Zodiak Kids, Candy Bear, QQD Limited and High1 Entertainment
Millie Inbetween	CBBC	2014–2018	
Secret Life of Boys	CBBC	2015–2021	
Floogals	Channel 5 Universal Kids	2016–2020	co-production with Jellyfish Pictures, Belly-Up and Nevision Studios One
The Lodge	Disney Channel UK	2016–2017	Owned by Disney Media Distribution
Kody Kapow	Universal Kids	2017–2018	co-production with Jam Filled Toronto
Spy School	CITV	2018–2019	
Tee and Mo	CBeebies; TVOKids	2018–2022	co-production with Plug In Media, Serious Lunch, Keyframe Animation and Radical Sheep Productions
Flatmates	BBC iPlayer	2019–present	
Mister Maker at Home	CBeebies	2020–2021	
Ted's Top 10	CITV	2021–present	
Silverpoint	CBBC; ZDF	2022–present	co-production with ZDF Studios

=== Tiger Aspect Kids & Family ===
Title	Years	Network	Notes
Mr. Bean: The Animated Series	2002–present	CITV	co-production with Varga Holdings (season 1) and Richard Purdum Productions (season 1)
Charlie and Lola	2005–2008	CBeebies	
Summerhill	2008	CBBC	
Undercover Dads!	2009	BBC Two & CBBC	
Tinga Tinga Tales	2010–2011	CBeebies	co-production with Homeboyz Animation and Classic Media; Owned by DreamWorks Animation
Me and My Monsters	2010–2011	CBBC; Network Ten (Australia)	co-production with The Jim Henson Company and Sticky Pictures
Aliens Love Underpants And...	2017	Sky Kids	
Danny & Mick	2019–2023	CBBC	
Corpse Talk	2022	YouTube	
Super Happy Magic Forest	2024–present	CBBC; Rai Gulp (Italy); ZDF (Germany); Canal+ Kids (France)	co-production with Monello Productions, Movimenti Production, Zodiak Kids & Family France, Rai Kids and ZDF Studios
Aquila & The Medieval Misfits	TBA	ITVX; Canal+ Kids (France); NDR (Germany); La Trois (Belgium)	co-production with Zodiak Kids & Family France

=== Monello Productions ===
Title	Network	Original running	Notes
Marblegen	TF1; Canal J	2018	co-production with Studio Red Frog, Pictanovo, Cofimage 28, Devtvcine 2 and Rai Ragazzi
Max & Maestro	France Télévisions; Rai Gulp; HR; TV5Monde	2018	co-production with MP1 and Rai Ragazzi
Rocky Kwaterner	France Télévisions; RTVE	2020	co-production with Mondo TV France and Peekaboo Animation
When I Was Your Age	France Télévisions	2021	co-production with MoBo Productions and Rai Ragazzi
Street Football	France Télévisions; Canal J Rai Gulp	2022–present	co-production with Zodiak Kids Studio France, Maga Animation Studio and Rai Ragazzi season 4 continued from Tele Images Kids
Hello Kitty: Super Style!	Amazon Prime Video; Canal+ M6; Rai Yoyo	2022–2024	co-production with Watch Next Media, Maga Animation Studio and Rai Kids
Totally Spies!	Gulli; Cartoon Network (EMEA); Discovery Kids (Latin America)	2024–present	as Ollenom Studio co-production with Zodiak Kids & Family France season 7
Chimera Keepers: Adventures with Incredible Creatures	France 4 La Trois & Ketnet (Belgium)	2024–present	co-production with Belvision
Super Happy Magic Forest	Canal+ Kids; CBBC (United Kingdom); ZDF (Germany); Rai Gulp (Italy)	2024–present	co-production with Movimenti Production, Tiger Aspect Kids & Family, Zodiak Kids & Family France, Rai Kids and ZDF Studios
Froggie	Gulli; RTVE (Spain)	TBA	co-production with Pikkukala

=== Movimenti Production ===
Title	Network	Original running	Notes
Loup	TF1; Télétoon+	2018	co-production with Making Prod, Rai Ragazzi and Samka Productions
Topo Gigio	Rai Yoyo	2020	co-production with Topo Gigio s.r.l
Tear Along the Dotted Line	Netflix	2021	co-production with BAO Publishing and DogHead Animation
This World Can't Tear Me Down	Netflix	2023	co-production with DogHead Animation
Miniheroes of the Forest	France Télévisions; RAI	2023–present	co-production with MoBo Productions and Zodiak Kids & Family France
Sfidiamoci	RAI	2024	co-production with Rai Fiction
L'Effetto Dorothy	RAI	2024	co-production with Rai Fiction
Spooky Wolf	Rai Gulp	2024–present	
Super Happy Magic Forest	BBC; RAI	2024–present	co-production with Monello Productions, Tiger Aspect Kids & Family and Zodiak Kids & Family France

=== Kindle Entertainment ===
Title	Years	Network	Notes
My Spy Family	2007–2010	Boomerang	co-production with Turner Broadcasting System Europe
Big & Small	2008–2011	CBeebies; Treehouse TV (Canada)	co-production with 3J's Productions, Sixteen South (series 3) and Studio 100; Owned by Studio 100
Jinx	2009–2010	BBC Two & CBBC	
Leonardo	2011–2012	CBBC	
Treasure Island	2012	Sky One	co-production with MNG Films and Parallel Film Productions
The Life and Adventures of Nick Nickleby	2012	BBC	
Hank Zipzer	2014–2016	CBBC	co-production with Walker Productions and DHX Media; Owned by WildBrain
Dinopaws	2014	CBeebies; Treehouse TV (Canada)	co-production with Guru Studio and Laughing Gravy Media
Dixi	2014–2017	CBBC Online	
Get Well Soon Hospital	2015–2017	CBeebies	
Jamilah and Aladdin	2015–2016	CBeebies	co-production with Toonz Entertainment, Mediabiz and Advantage Entertainment
Kiss Me First	2018	Channel 4	co-production with Baloon
The A List	2018–2021	BBC iPlayer/Netflix	
Little Darlings	2022	Sky Kids	

=== Tele Images Productions ===
Title	Year(s)	Network	Notes
Maguy	France 2	1985–1993	
Marc et Sophie	TF1	1987–1992	
Vivement lundi	TF1	1988–1992	
Tel père, tel fils	Antenne 2	1988–1989	
Tribunal	TF1	1989–1994	
The Fruitties	TVE 1 TVE 2 TF1	1990–1992	co-production with D'Ocon Films Productions; Currently owned by D'Ocon Films themselves
The Little Flying Bears	Family Channel	1990–1991	co-production with CinéGroupe and Zagreb Film
Besoin de personne	Antenne 2	1991	
Les Années FM	M6	1992	
Sylvie et compagnie	France 2	1992	
Cousin William	France 3 La Cinquième	1992–1993	
L'annexe	France 2	1993	
Zoe and Charlie	Canal+ France 3 TVO	1993	co-production with CinéGroupe
Bouge-toi	Télé emploi	1994	
Les Gromelot et les Dupinson	France 2	1995	
Tales of the Rue Broca	France 3 Canal J	1995	co-production with FIT Productions and Millimages
The Magical Adventures of Quasimodo	France 3 Family Channel	1996	co-production with CinéGroupe and Astral Media
Dossier: disparus	France 2	1998–2000	
The Tide of Life	France 2	1998–2000	
Skippy: Adventures in Bushtown	Nine Network	1998–1999	co-production with Yoram Gross-Village Roadshow and Videal GmbH
L'Aventure photographique	France 5	1998	co-production with Rosebud Productions and INA Films
Norman Normal	France 2 France 3 Super RTL	1999–2004	co-production with EM.TV & Merchandising AG (season 1), Trickompany Filmproduktion (season 1) and Magma Films
Jules Verne's Amazing Journeys	France 3	2000–2001	
Space Millenium	ZDF	2001	co-production with NHK Enterprises 21
Une fille d'enfer	France 2	2004	co-production with YC Alligator Productions and Ananda Productions
Miracle Planet	NHK; Science Channel	2004	co-production with National Film Board of Canada, Telepool and NHK Enterprises 21
KidsWorld Sports	BBC Kids; Discovery Kids	2004–2005	co-production with Breakthrough Entertainment
Atomic Betty	Teletoon; M6; Télétoon	2004–2007	co-production with Atomic Cartoons, Breakthrough Entertainment and Marathon Group (season 3)
Les aventuriers des îles oubliées	France 2	2004	co-production with Voyage
Allo T où?	TF1	2005	
Seaside Hotel	TF1	2005–2006	co-production with Yoram Gross-EM.TV
Street Football	France 3	2005–present	co-production with De Mas Partners, Agogo Media (season 1) and Rai Fiction seasons 1–3 continued by Zodiak Kids & Family France and Monello Productions from season 4
Adiboo Adventure	France 5	2007–2009	co-production with Mindscape
Co2	MCM	2007	co-production with Je Suis Bien Content
Chante!	France 2	2008	co-production with Sony BMG Music Entertainment and AT-Production
Six angles vifs	France 3	2008	
Sally Bollywood: Super Detective	France 3 Seven Network; 7Two	2009–2013	co-production with Three's a Company
The Basketeers	M6	2011–2014	co-production with I Can Fly, Cwak Productions, Seahorse Animation and Zodiak Kids
Duo	France 2	2012	co-production with AT-Production
Lignes le vie	France 2	2012	
The Ranch	ARD; TF1; Télétoon+	2012–2016	co-production with De Agostini Editore, Equidia and Zodiak Kids
Extreme Football	France Télévisions; Gulli; Canal J	2014–2015	co-production with Maga Animation Studio, Rai Fiction, Marathon and Zodiak Kids

=== Procidis ===
Title	Network	Original running	Notes
Les Aventures de Colargol	Antenne Deuxième chaîne de l’ORTF	1970–1974	
Once Upon a Time... Man	FR3	1978–1979	co-production with France Régions, Société Radio-Canada, ACCESS Alberta, Radiotelevisione italiana, Swiss Broadcasting Corporation, Radiodiffusion-Télévision Belge, Belgische Radio en Televisie, Katholieke Radio Omroep, Norsk rikskringkasting, Sveriges Radio, Televisión Española and Tatsunoko Production
Once Upon a Time... Space	FR3	1982–1983	co-production with France Régions, Société Radio-Canada, Radiotelevisione italiana, Katholieke Radio Omroep, Televisión Española, Crustel and Eiken
Once Upon a Time... Life	Canal+	1987–1988	co-production with FR3, Canal+, Société Radio-Canada, Televisión Española, Katholieke Radio Omroep, Radio Télévision Suisse Romande, Radiotelevisione della Svizzera Italiana, Radio-télévision belge de la Communauté française, Belgische Radio en Televisie Nederlandse Uitzendingen and Eiken
Once Upon a Time... The Americas	Canal+	1991–1993	co-production with FR3, Canal+, Televisión Española, Westdeutscher Rundfunk, Südwestrundfunk, Reteitalia, Société Radio-Canada, Radio Télévision Suisse Romande, Radiotelevisione della Svizzera Italiana, Oy. Yleisradio Ab., Radio-télévision belge de la Communauté française, Belgische Radio en Televisie Nederlandse Uitzendingen and Centre national de la cinématographie
Once Upon a Time... The Discoverers	Canal+	1994	co-production with FR3, Canal+, Televisión Española, Westdeutscher Rundfunk, Südwestrundfunk, Reteitalia, Radio Télévision Suisse Romande, Radiotelevisione della Svizzera Italiana, Radio-télévision belge de la Communauté française, Oy. Yleisradio Ab. and Centre national de la cinématographie
Once Upon a Time... The Explorers	Canal+	1996–1997	co-production with FR3, Canal+, Televisión Española, Westdeutscher Rundfunk, Südwestrundfunk, Sender Freies Berlin, Mediaset, Radio Télévision Suisse Romande, Radiotelevisione della Svizzera Italiana, Radio-télévision belge de la Communauté française and Centre national de la cinématographie
Wild Instinct	M6	2001	co-production with Praxinos
Once Upon a Time... Planet Earth	France 3	2008	co-production with France 3, Centre National de la Cinematographie, Directorate-General for Research and European Broadcasting Union
Once Upon a Time... The Objects	RTS 1	2023–present	co-production with Samka Productions, Sklan & ka, Studio Zmei, France Télévisions, Hot, TV5Monde, Radio Télévision Suisse and Centre national de la cinématographie

== Banijay Benelux ==
=== Endemol Shine Nederland ===
Title	Network	Original running	Notes
Kees & Co	RTL 4	1997–2020	
Domino Day	SBS6	1998–2009	as Endemol
Big Brother	Veronica TV/Yorin/Talpa	1999–2006	as Endemol
Eén tegen 100	TROS/Talpa/RTL 4/NCRV/KRO-NCRV/AVROTROS	2000–present	
Miljoenenjacht	Nederland 2 Talpa/Tien/RTL 4/SBS6	2000–present	
Starmaker	Veronica TV/Yorin	2001	as Endemol
Secret Story	NET5	2011	as Endemol
Show Me the Money	SBS6	2011	as Endemol
De 12 van Oldenheim	RTL 4/Videoland	2017–present	
All Together Now	RTL 4	2019	
Lego Masters	RTL 4	2020–present	
Domino Challenge	RTL 4	2022	

== Banijay Germany ==
=== Brainpool TV ===
Title	Network	Original running	Notes
Die Wochenshow	Sat.1	1996–2002	
Ladykracher	Sat.1	2002–2013	
Rent a Pocher	ProSieben	2003–2006	
Anke Late Night	Sat.1	2004	
Stromberg	ProSieben	2004–2012	
Bundesvision Song Contest	ProSieben	2005–2012	
Schlag den Raab	ProSieben	2006–2015	co-production with Raab TV

=== Endemol Shine Germany ===
Title	Original running	Network	Notes
Domino Day	1998–2009	RTL	as Endemol Deutschland
Wer wird Millionär?	1999–present	RTL	continued from Endemol Deutschland
Big Brother Germany	2000–2020	RTL Zwei; Sixx; Sat.1	
Die Chance deines Lebens	2000–2003	Sat.1	as Endemol Deutschland
Fame Academy	2003	RTL II; Tele 5 MTV2	as Endemol Deutschland
Deal or No Deal	2004–2015	Sat.1	continued from Endemol Deutschland
Deutschlands MeisterKoch	2010	Sat.1	
Deutschlands Superhirn	2011–2016	ZDF	continued from Endemol Deutschland
Promi Big Brother	2013–present	Sat.1	continued from Endemol Deutschland
The Big Music Quiz	2016–2017	RTL	
The Wall	2017–2018	RTL	
Big Bounce – Die Trampolin Show	2018–2019	RTL	
Lego Masters	2018–present	RTL	
The Masked Singer	2019–present	ProSieben	
Mälzer und Henssler liefern ab!	2021–present	VOX	
The Masked Dancer	2022–present	ProSieben	
All Together Now	2022–present	Sat.1	

== Banijay France ==
=== Adventure Line Productions ===
Title	Years	Network	Notes
Fort Boyard	1990–present	France 2	
Treasure Map	1996–present	France 3	
The Desert Forges	2001	Channel 5	Co-production with Grundy
Koh-Lanta	2001–present	TF1	
Popstars	2001–2007	M6	
Lightning	2007–2011	France 2	Co-production with Terence Films
Fort Boyard: Ultimate Challenge	2011–2014	CITV	Co-produced with The Foundation
Cut !	2013–2019	France Ô	Co-production with Terence Films

=== Terence Films ===
Title	Original running	Network	Notes
Lightning	2007–2011	France 2	Co-production with Adventure Line Productions
Fortunes	2011	Arte	
Cut !	2013–2019	France Ô	Co-production with Adventure Line Productions
Les Innocents	2018	TF1	
O.P.J.	2019–present	La Première/France Ô	

=== Endemol France ===
Title	Original running	Network	Notes
Les Enfants de la télé	1994–present	France 2/TF1	
La Fureur	1995–2008	France 2/TF1/W9	
Plein les yeux	1997–present	TF1/RMC Story	
Le Bigdil	1998–2004	TF1	
Exclusif	1998–2002	TF1	
Les P'tites Canailles	1998–2000	TF1	
Les Moments de vérité	1999–2004	M6	
Pourquoi, comment ?	1999–2001	France 3	
120 minutes de bonheur	1999–2005	TF1	
Toutes les chansons ont une histoire	2000–2001	TF1	
Nos meilleurs moments	2000–2001	TF1	
Domino Day	2000–2014	M6/TF1/TMC/D8	
Le bêtisier du net	2001	TF1	
Attention à la marche !	2001–2010	TF1	
Loft Story	2001–2002	M6	
Allo quiz	2001–2004	TF1	
Star Academy	2001–present	TF1/NRJ 12	
Rêve d'un jour	2001–2003	TF1	
Opération séduction aux Caraïbes	2002–2004	M6	
Blagadonf	2002–2007	Canal J/France 2	
Zone rouge	2003–2005	TF1	
Fear Factor	2003–2004	TF1	
Nice People	2003	TF1	
Samedi soir en direct	2003–2004	Canal+	
Les 100 plus grands...	2003–2020	TF1/TMC	
A bout de forces	2003	M6	
À prendre ou à laisser	2004–2021	TF1/C8	
La Ferme Célébrités	2004–2010	TF1	
Le grand piège	2004	M6	
Première Compagnie	2005	TF1	
Cresus	2005–2006	TF1	
Choc, l'émission	2005–2007	NT1	
Le Soiring	2006–2007	TPS Star	
Morandini !	2006–2012	Direct 8	
Les 30 histoires les plus mystérieuses	2006–2011	TF1	
Un monde presque parfait	2006–2007	France 2	
T'empêches tout le monde de dormir	2006–2008	M6	
Magiciens, leurs plus grands secrets	2006–2008	M6	
Manu et Bruno sont dans la télé	2006–2007	M6	
1 contre 100	2007–2008	TF1	
Les 30 histoires les plus spectaculaires	2007–2012	TF1	
Secret Story	2007–present	TF1/NT1/TFX/TMC	as Endemol Shine France
Splash Dance	2007	Direct 8	
60 secondes du Colisée	2007	France 2	
Êtes-vous plus fort qu'un élève de 10 ans ?	2007	M6	
Le Grand Quiz du cerveau	2007–2011	TF1	
Culture VIP	2008	Direct 8	
Bienvenue chez les Sander	2008	Comédie!	
L'École des stars	2008–2009	Direct 8	
Maman cherche l'amour	2008–2009	M6	
Identity	2009–2010	TF1	
Ça passe ou ça trappe	2009	NRJ 12	
Les 30 histoires les plus extraordinaires	2009–2012	TF1	
Love and Bluff : Qui de nous trois ?	2009	TF1	
Total Wipeout	2009	M6	
Y'a une solution à tout !	2009	Direct 8	
Le Grand Duel des générations	2009	TF1	
La Bataille des chorales	2009	TF1	
Les Parents les plus stricts du monde	2010	M6	
Nous zappons pour vous !	2010	Direct 8	
L'amour est aveugle	2010–2014	TF1	
Les Douze Coups de midi	2010–present	TF1	
MasterChef France	2010–2022	TF1/NT1/France 2	continued from Shine France
Zéro de conduite	2011	M6	
Carré ViiiP	2011	TF1	
Personne n'y avait pensé !	2011–2021	France 3	
Money Drop	2011–2017	TF1	
Baby Boom	2011–present	TF1	continued from Shine France
MasterChef Junior	2011–2013	TF1	as Shine France
Patron incognito	2012–present	M6	
Au pied du mur !	2012–2014	TF1	
60 secondes chrono	2012–2013	M6	as Shine France
Tout le monde aime la France	2012–2013	TF1	as Shine France, co-production with Talpa
Amazing Race	2012	D8	as Shine France
Télé-réalité : leur nouvelle vie	2013–2014	TF6	
Un air de star	2013	M6	
The Best : Le Meilleur Artiste	2013–2014	TF1	as Shine France, co-production with Talpa
La Meilleure Boulangerie de France	2013–present	M6	continued from Shine France
Qu'est-ce que je sais vraiment ?	2014–2016	M6	as Shine France, co-production with Talpa
The Winner Is	2014	TF1	as Shine France, co-production with Talpa
Prodiges	2014–present	France 2	continued from Shine France
Mon food truck à la clé	2015	France 2	as Shine France
Les Extra-ordinaires	2015–2016	TF1	
The Island	2015–2018	M6	as Endemol Shine France
Got to Dance : Le Meilleur Danseur	2015	TMC	as Shine France
Qui est la taupe ?	2015	M6	
Le Grand Blind test	2015–2018	TF1	as Endemol Shine France, co-production with Ardisson & Lumières
L'Académie des neuf	2015	NRJ 12	as Shine France, co-production with Studio 120
The Apprentice : Qui décrochera le job ?	2015	M6	
Puppets ! Le grand show des marionnettes	2016	TF1	as Shine France, co-production with Talpa
SuperKids	2016	M6/W9	as Shine France, co-production with Talpa
À l'état sauvage	2016–2018	M6	as Endemol Shine France
C'est le bouquet, la bataille des fleuristes	2017	TF1	as Shine France, co-production with Talpa
The Wall : Face au mur	2017–2018	TF1	
Escape, 21 jours pour disparaître	2018–2019	RMC Découverte/RMC Story	as Endemol Shine France
The Bridge : Le Trésor de Patagonie	2019	M6	Produced as Endemol Shine France
Big Bounce, la course de trampoline	2019	TF1	Produced as Endemol Shine France
Together, tous avec moi	2019	M6/W9	Produced as Endemol Shine France
Les Enfants de la musique	2019–2021	France 3	
Lego Masters	2020–2025	M6	
LOL: qui rit, sort!	2021–present	Prime Video	
Celebrity Hunted : Chasse a l'homme	2021–present	Prime Video	
Drag Race France	2022–present	France.tv Slash/France 2	
Liars Club	2025–present	Prime Video	
Drag Race France All Stars	2025–present	France 2	

=== B-Prod ===
Title	Original running	Network	Notes
Dilemme	2010	W9	as ALJ Productions
The Sticks	2011–2014	W9	
Party Workers	2012–2022	W9	
Popstars	2013	D8	
A season at the Zoo	2014–present	France 4	

=== Banijay Studios France ===
==== Gétévé Productions ====
Title	Original running	Network	Notes
Counterstrike	1990–1992	USA Network	as Gaumont-Robur Television
Fly by Night	1991	CBS	as Gaumont-Robur Television
Highlander: The Series	1992–1998	Syndication	as Gaumont Television
Highlander: The Animated Series	1994–1996	Syndication	as Gaumont Television
Tales of the Wild	1994–1995	Canal+/France 3	as Gaumont Television
Tales of the South Seas	1998	Network Ten	as Gaumont Television
Highlander: The Raven	1998–1999	Syndication	as Gaumont Television
Relic Hunter	1999–2002	Syndication	as Gaumont Television (season 1)
Central Nuit	2001–2008	France 2	
Adventure Inc.	2002–2003	Syndication	
Chez F.O.G.	2006–2009	France 5	
Blood on the Docks	2011–2016	France 2	
The Accident	2016	La Une/France 3	
Skam France	2018–2023	Slash/France 4/La Trois	
Red Shadows	2019	C8	co-production with H2O Productions

== Television movies and specials ==
=== Banijay UK ===
==== Darlow Smithson Productions ====
- The Last Dragon (2004)
- 9/11: The Falling Man (2006)
- Deep Water (2006)
- The Sinking of the Lusitania: Terror at Sea (2007)
- Clapham Junction (2007)
- Children of 9/11 (2011)
- MegaQuake: Hour That Shook Japan (2011)
- Tornado Rampage 2011 (2011)
- How the Bismarck Sank HMS Hood (2012)
- Richard III: The Unseen Story (2013)
- Hawking (2013)
- Dave Allen at Peace (2018)
- Agatha and the Truth of Murder (2018)
- Torvill & Dean (2018)
- Agatha and the Curse of Ishtar (2019)
- Agatha and the Midnight Murders (2020)

==== Tiger Aspect Productions ====
- Sherlock Holmes and the Case of the Silk Stocking (2004)
- Coming Down the Mountain (2007)
- White Girl (2008)
- Marvellous (2014) (co-production with Fifty Fathoms)
- Jack Whitehall at Large (2017)
- Murder on the Blackpool Express (2017) (co-production with Shiny Button Productions)
- Kevin Hart: Irresponsible (2019) (co-production with HartBeat Productions and 3 Arts Entertainment)
- Jack Whitehall: I'm Only Joking (2020)
- Big Age (2021)
- My Name is Leon (2022) (co-production with Douglas Road Productions, Ringside Studios, Ingenious Media, Tayox TV Limited and Vicarious)

==== Kudos ====
- Comfortably Nube (2004)
- Ladybaby (2021)

==== Shiny Button Productions ====
- Murder on the Blackpool Express (2017) (co-production with Tiger Aspect Productions)
- Dial M for Middlesbrough (2019)

==== Dragonfly ====
- The Thieving Headmasters (2006)
- Pompeii... Live! (2006) (co-production with Mentorn Media, WNET and National Geographic International)
- Pirate Ship... Live!!! (2007)
- Super Botox Me (2008)
- Cutting Edge: Ninety Naps a Day (2008)
- Terror at Sea: The Sinking of Costa Concordia (2012)
- The Sinking of the Concordia: Caught on Camera (2012)
- June Brown: Respect Your Elders (2012)
- One Born: Twins and Triplets (2012)
- Sandy: Anatomy of a Superstorm (2012)
- One Born: Plus Size Mums (2012)
- The Horsemeat Banquet (2013)
- Dinner at 11 (2014)
- Date My Mum (2016)
- Flashy Funerals (2016)
- The Boy Who Sees Upside Down (2016)
- A World Without Down's Syndrone? (2016)
- My Dad, the Peace Deal & Me (2018)
- The Science(ish) of... Stranger Things (2021)
- Leigh-Anne: Race, Pop & Power (2021)
- Patrick Kielty: One Hundred Years of Union (2021)
- Dr. Alex: Our Young Mental Health Crisis (2021)

==== Workerbee ====
- Hindus: Do We Have a Caste Problem? (2019)
- Building the World's Fastest Car (2020)
- Secrets of the Luxury Super Yachts (2020)
- Billionaire Cruise Ship: Paradise Island (2021)
- Bruno v Tyson (2021) (co-production with Sky Studios)

==== IWC Media ====
- Hire My Home (2021)
- Scotland the Rave (2021)

===== Ideal World Productions =====
- Hunting the Washington Sniper (2002)
- The Planman (2003)

==== Electric Robin ====
- Homecoming: The Road to Mullingar (2022)

==== The Comedy Unit ====
- Scotland's Football Jukebox (2021)

==== Sidney Street ====
- Gok Wan's Easy Asian Christmas (2021)
- The Jubliee Pudding: 70 Years in the Baking (2022)

==== Zeppotron ====
- I Blame the Spice Girls: The Monster Quiz of the Decade (2007)
- Tapping the Wire (2007)
- Charlie Brooker's Gameswipe (2009)
- Alternative Election Special (2010)
- The Boyle Variety Performance (2012)
- How Videogames Changed the World (2013)
- 8 Out of 10 Cats Does Deal or No Deal (2013)
- Frankie Boyle's Election Autopsy (2015)
- Nigel Farage Gets His Life Back (2016)

===== Definitely =====
- Gemma Collins: Self-Harm & Me (2022)

==== Blacklight Television ====
- The Queen's Sister (2005)
- The Best Man (2006)
- A Harlot's Progress (2006) (co-production with Hardy and Sons)
- Wild Decembers (2009)
- Octavia (2009)
- Joint Enterprise (2012)
- Ellen (2016)

==== Diverse Productions ====
- The Truth About Gay Animals (2002)
- Killing Hitler (2003)
- Status Anxiety (2004)
- Who Wrote the Bible (2004)
- Happy Birthday, Peter Pan (2005)
- Our Hiden Wives (2005)
- Greatest Ever Comedy Movies (2006) (co-production with Roger Grant Productions)
- Greatest Ever 80s Movies (2007) (co-production with Roger Grant Productions)
- The Secret Life of the Berlin Wall (2009)
- Samurai (2010) (as Diverse Bristol)
- Mrs Mandela (2010)

==== Tigress Productions ====
- Britain's Wild Invaders (2000)
- The Great Shark Chase (2016)
- Chris Packham: In Search of the Lost Girl (2018)
- The Great British Germ Hunt (2018)

==== Remarkable Television ====
- Your Top 20 Celebrity Big Brother Moments (2009)
- Big Brother's Big Awards Show (2010)
- Inside Chernobyl with Ben Foyle (2021)
- Don't Diet Lose Weight (2021)

==== Douglas Road Productions ====
- Lenny Henry: The Commonwealth Kid (2018) (co-production with Burning Light Productions)
- Unsung Heroines: Danielle de Niese on the Lost World of Female Composers (2018)
- The Lenny Henry Birthday Show (2018) (co-production with BBC Studios)
- My Name is Leon (2022) (co-production with Tiger Aspect Productions, Ringside Studios, Ingenious Media, Tayox TV Limited and Vicarious)
- Judi Love: Black, Female and Invisible (2022)
- Una Marson: Our Lost Caribbean Voice (2022)

==== Initial ====
- On Yer Bike for Soccer Aid (2021) (co-production with Crackit Productions)
- Lee Mack's Road to Soccer Aid (2021)

==== Shine TV ====
- 100 Greatest Sexy Moments (2003)
- The 100 Greatest Musicals (2003)
- The Simpsons Quiz Show (2004)
- My Shakespeare (2004) (co-production with Penguin Television)
- The 100 Greatest Tearjerkers (2005)
- 100 Greatest Cartoons (2005)
- Teenage Toutrage Camp (2006)
- 100 Greatest Funny Moments (2006)
- The 100 Greatest Sex Symbols (2007)
- The Lying Game: Crimes That Fooded Britain (2014)
- The Walton Sextulpets at 30 (2014) (co-production with Ettinger Brothers)
- Bear Grylls: Surviving the Island (2014) (co-production with Bear Grylls Ventures)
- Kilimanjaro: The Bigger Red Nose Climb (2019)
- A Berry Royal Christmas (2019)
- Sports Relief: The Heat is On (2020)
- A Very British Lockdown: Diaries from the Frontline (2020)
