= When I Was Your Age (disambiguation) =

"When I Was Your Age" is a song by Weird Al Yankovic.

When I Was Your Age may also refer to:

- "When I Was Your Age", an episode of My Three Sons
- "When I Was Your Age", an episode of Cloudy with a Chance of Meatballs
- When I Was Your Age (TV series), a French animated series
- When I Was Your Age, a 2023 memoir by Saturday Night Live cast member Kenan Thompson

== See also ==
- When I Was Young (disambiguation)
- In My Time (disambiguation)
