= The Real Deal =

(The) Real Deal may refer to:

== Television ==
- The Real Deal (TV series), retitled The Real Estate Pros, a 2007 American reality show
- Dickinson's Real Deal, a UK antiques and collectables programme (2006–2024)
  - Real Deal (American TV series), a 2001 American version of Dickinson's Real Deal
- "The Real Deal", 12th episode of the 5th season (2018) of Agents of S.H.I.E.L.D.

== Music ==
=== Albums ===
- Real Deal (album), by David Murray and Milford Graves (1994)
- The Real Deal (Isley Brothers album) (1982)
- The Real Deal: Greatest Hits Volume 2, by Stevie Ray Vaughan (1999)
- Untilted - The Real Deal, by Autechre (2005)
- The Real Deal (John Primer album) (1995)
- The Real Deal (Smokey Wilson album) (1995)
- The Real Deal (Edgar Winter album) (1996)

=== Songs ===
- "Real Deal" (song), by Jessie J. (2017)
- "Real Deal", by the Feeling, from The Feeling (2016)
- "Real Deal", by Tyga (2014)
- "The Real Deal", by Hoodoo Gurus, from Electric Chair (1998)
- "The Real Deal", by Sammy Hagar, from Ten 13 (2000)
- "The Real Deal", by Mike Denver with George Jones (2008)

== Other ==
- a nickname for boxer Evander Holyfield
- a nickname for baseball pitcher J. D. Durbin
- Real Deal (comics)
- The Real Deal (magazine), New York-based real estate magazine
- TheRealDeal, darknet market part of the cyber-arms industry
