= Claire Harman =

Claire Harman may refer to:

- Claire Harman (actress), British actress
- Claire Harman (writer), British writer and critic
