= Street football =

Street football may refer to:

- Street football (association football)
- Street football (American)
- Street Football (TV series)
- Street Football, an arcade video game published by Bally Sente

== See also ==
- Medieval football
