= Late Night Shopping =

2001 film by Saul Metzstein

- Directed by: Saul Metzstein
- Written by: Jack Lothian
- Produced by: Angus Lamont
- Starring: Luke de Woolfson; James Lance; Kate Ashfield; Enzo Cilenti
- Edited by: Justine Wright
- Music by: Alex Heffes
- Production companies: SMG Productions; Scottish Screen; Glasgow Film Office; Film4 Productions
- Release date: 2001
- Running time: 88 minutes
- Country: United Kingdom
- Language: English
- Box office: $152,000 (United Kingdom)

Late Night Shopping is a 2001 comedy film funded by FilmFour Productions, centering on a group of friends who all work the graveyard shifts.

== Plot ==
Sean, Vincent, Jody and Lenny work graveyard shifts in various soul-killing jobs (a hospital, a supermarket, a printed circuit board assembly factory and a call centre, respectively) and meet up in a cafe after work to kill time. Apart from this each has very little of a life. Sean hasn't met his girlfriend for three weeks and is beginning to wonder if she still lives in his flat. Vincent is a serial womanizer. Lenny, formerly a writer of porn stories, can't pluck up the courage to ask out his attractive workmate Gail. Jody, unknown to the others, has been fired from her job, but still shows up after her "shift" every night to talk.

At the hospital, Sean strikes up a friendship with the girlfriend of a coma patient; she confides in him that at the time of the accident she was about to end the relationship. Later, the two have sex on the foot of the hospital bed occupied by the comatose male.

Meanwhile, Vincent picks up an attractive young woman, who turns out to be Sean's girlfriend Madeline. Several days later Vincent's colleague Joe has a fatal heart attack; As he is taken to the hospital, Vincent accompanies him and runs into Sean. In a moment of humanity he confesses to have slept with Madeline; Sean reacts first with disbelief, then with violence. Returning to his flat, he discovers that Madeline has moved out.

Sean receives an anonymous phone call and tracing it discovers that it came from a small town where Madeline's friend has an aunt. Sean, Lenny and Jody decide to drive there to find Madeline. On the way there they spot Vincent on the side of the road; they pick him up, and Sean says they're even after crushing Vincent's favourite possession - a watch that belonged to Errol Flynn.

Unable to find Madeline the group gather in a cafe and Jody confesses that she lost her job. After Vincent and Lenny leave to play crazy golf, Jody runs into Madeline and sets up a meeting between her and Sean; the two of them discuss the issues in their relationship and come to the conclusion that everything is over.

On the way back the group stops at a motorway service station; Lenny asks Gail out and is turned down, but still sees this as progress. Madeline and Sean argue over who gets to keep the flat, but later kiss when taking photobooth pictures together.

The final scene has Gail finally manage to switch the irritating radio station; the radio plays a noticeably more modern and upbeat song.

== Cast ==
- Luke de Woolfson as Sean
- James Lance as Vincent
- Kate Ashfield as Jody
- Enzo Cilenti as Lenny
- Heike Makatsch as Madeline Zozzocolovich
- Shauna Macdonald as Gail
- Sienna Guillory as Susie
- Laurie Ventry as Joe
- Claire Harman as Wendy

== Reception ==
The film attracted mixed reviews. In a largely critical Sight & Sound review, Andy Richards highlighted the "charmlessness" of the characters and the "trite" pre-credits, Trainspotting-esque voice over. Although the film was set in Glasgow, only the peripheral characters actually spoke with a regional accent. Overall, Richards brands the film "impoverished in ideas." However, in an article for the BBC, Michael Thomson praises the "regular supply of smart ideas from writer Jack Lothian and director Saul Metzstein", while acknowledging the "plot-contrivance and phoniness" of the final section.
