= Britain's Best Brain =

British game show

- Created by: Ian Lamarra; Ricky Kelehar; Howard Davidson; Beren Money
- Presented by: Jamie Theakston; Zoe Ball
- Country of origin: United Kingdom
- Original language: English
- No. of series: 1
- No. of episodes: 8

Production
- Executive producer: Deborah Sergeant
- Running time: 60 minutes (inc. adverts)
- Production companies: Group M Entertainment and Tiger Aspect Productions

Original release
- Network: Channel 5
- Release: 28 October – 16 December 2009

Related
- The Krypton Factor; Britain's Brightest

Britain's Best Brain is a British game show that aired on Channel 5 from 28 October to 16 December 2009 and hosted by Jamie Theakston and Zoe Ball. It saw ordinary members of the public undertake various tasks, all scientifically designed to test different parts of the brain. The show ran every Wednesday and was aired from 28 October to 16 December 2009. The winner, crowned 'Britain's Best Brain 2009', was Matt Clancy, a 29-year-old marketing consultant from London.

== Rounds ==
- Calculation: designed to test the parietal lobe.
- Memory: designed to test the temporal lobe.
- Recognition: designed to test the occipital lobe.
- Co-ordination: designed to test the cerebellum.
- Risk: designed to test the frontal lobe.

== Qualifying leaderboard ==
Pos.	Player	Age	Home Location	Heat	Brain Score
1	Matt Clancy	29	London	2	1040
2	Mike Park	22	Warrington	4	982
3	Andrew Copley	36	Cambridgeshire	4	971
4	Jo Knight	39	County Durham	3	940
5	Chris Teear	42	Northampton	2	917
did not qualify
6	Jess Brice	25	Chesterfield	3	901
7	Dan Whelan	20	Cambridge	2	896
8	Niall ??	48	Belfast	6	874
9	Emma ??	27	Bristol	6	872
10	Su Crown	30	London	2	850
11	Kirk Parton	25	Cleveland	6	841
12	David Jobson	29	Pitlochry	6	822
13	Matt Walters	39	Leicester	3	807
14	Sharon Forbes	54	Chippenham	2	781
15	Ryan Howle	24	Manchester	1	754
16	Chris ??	48	Crawley	4	740
17	Marcia ??	46	Sutton	6	729
18	Kevin Laing	20	Stevenage	3	727
19	Karyn Cooke	19	County Durham	7	717
20	Natalie Keane	35	Edgware	3	712
21	Jackie McCoan	42	Pembrokeshire	1	678
22	Owen Hughes	21	Derbyshire (Long Eaton)	5	667
23	Andy ??	36	Conwy	5	666
24	Stacey ??	26	Berkshire	5	649
25	Lesley Bland	36	Leeds	7	615
26	Gemma ??	28	Bridgend	7	605
27	Moez ??	23	Manchester	4	579
28	Catherine Cran	25	London	1	576
29	Sonia Ashta-Sidhu	29	Middlesex	1	557
30	Helen ??	39	West Sussex	5	542
31	Anthony ??	34	Cambridgeshire	5	536
32	Jules May	47	Montrose	1	530
33	Samantha ??	37	Middlesex	4	485
34	James ??	41	Epsom	7	476
35	Edward ??	59	Galashiels	7	309

== Grand Final leaderboard ==
Pos.	Player	Age	Home Location	Brain Scores					
Pos.	Player	Age	Home Location	Calculation	Memory	Recognition	Co-ordination	Risk	Total
1	Matt Clancy	29	London	162	270	120	255	0	807
2	Jo Knight	39	County Durham	162	178	142	277	0	759
3	Andrew Copley	36	Cambridgeshire	135	231	102	254	0	722
4	Mike Park	22	Warrington	109	240	168	184	0	701
5	Chris Teear	42	Northampton	147	25	52	234	0	458
