= Undercover Dads! =

- Created by: Howard Davidson
- Presented by: Dave Chapman
- Country of origin: United Kingdom
- Original language: English
- No. of series: 1
- No. of episodes: 13

Production
- Running time: 60 minutes
- Production company: Tiger Aspect Productions

Original release
- Network: BBC Two; CBBC
- Release: 26 July – 24 October 2009

Undercover Dads is a cult British television programme popular with both kids and adults. Created by format producer Howard Davidson, it first aired on BBC2 and CBBC in 2009. Presented by comedian, actor and puppeteer Dave Chapman (The Slammer, The Thick of It, Shooting Stars, Dick and Dom in Da Bungalow), the show challenges a hard-working dad to get to know his kids, bring his family closer together and win them prizes....by dressing up as made-up TV expert 'Mega Nanny' and spending two whole days in their company without them realising it.

== Premise ==
The kids think that dad has gone away for work, but he's actually been in a make-up van just around the corner, being fitted with a prosthetic mask and dressed up as a lady. He has also spent some time at 'Nanny Boot Camp' learning how to walk and talk like a lady.

Over the course of the show, Dad (aka Mega Nanny), must complete a series of comedy challenges with the help of Mum and Dave Chapman. For example, in the first challenge '..And a Sausage Roll', he must make a phone call to a shop, as a lady, and order various bizarre things, including a Sausage Roll. In 'Where's Your Wig At?', he must enter the house without his wig on, and rescue it, without the kids spotting him. Each secret challenge, if successfully completed, wins the kids a family day out.

During the two days, he will also find out what the kids think of their home lives and how they'd like to change Dad (EG play with them more, not watch telly or talk about soccer all the time). Often the dads are quite shocked at what their kids say. At the end of the two days, Mega Nanny's true identity is revealed, and Dad will face one final challenge, a quiz to prove that over the two days, he has got to know the kids better. If he passes, he'll get to join them on those family prizes – if he fails, he has to help them with their homework for a month.

== Production and showtimes ==
The show was produced in the UK by Tiger Aspect Productions and airs Sundays 9am on BBC2, with repeats on Saturdays 5:15pm on CBBC.
