= New Hero of Comedy =

British TV documentary series

- Also known as: New Heroes of Comedy
- Genre: Comedy documentary
- Country of origin: United Kingdom
- Original language: England
- No. of series: 1
- No. of episodes: 3

Production
- Running time: 60 minutes

Original release
- Network: Channel 4
- Release: 22 February – 7 March 2008

Related
- Heroes of Comedy

New Hero of Comedy, also known as New Heroes of Comedy when covering more than one person, is a three-part documentary series on Channel 4, featuring the rise of famous comedians of recent times. The series started on 22 February 2008. The first episode covers the career of Ricky Gervais, the second Matt Lucas and David Walliams, and the last Sacha Baron Cohen. The series received complaints before it was broadcast, with some people complaining that the people featured in the episodes are not "Heroes".

== Production ==
The first two episodes were commissioned by Darren Smith, the comedy editor for Channel 4. The third was commissioned by Shane Allen, the Channel 4 comedy commissioning editor. Each episode was made by a different production company. The Gervais episode was made by Tiger Aspect Productions, the Lucas and Walliams episode by Shine Limited and the Baron Cohen episode by North One Television.

== Reception ==
Complaints rose before the series had begun. Gareth McLean said, "I'm not sure if it speaks more of the desperate barrel-scraping at the idea-free zone that is Channel 4 or the blunting of our critical faculties and the ease with which we're impressed nowadays concomitant with the devaluing of the terms "genius" and "hero", but this is some sort of joke, right? Are we seriously meant to believe that Gervais et al. are heroes? Unless, of course, the measure of comedy heroism is the amount of merchandise you can shift."

One review in The Times compared the series unfavourably to Heroes of Comedy, a previous Channel 4 programme saying, "The old Heroes of Comedy strand on Channel 4 wasn't simply an entertaining combination of clips and talking heads. Because it had the benefit of hindsight, it was able to place comedians in a broader historical context, so laughter was combined with painless social and cultural history. New Hero of Comedy, starting tonight with a profile of Ricky Gervais, will lack that crucial ingredient."

Sam Wollaston in The Guardian said that the Gervais episode, "is just a Ricky love-in, a mass worship at the feet of Gervais." However, he did comment positively on the quality of guests appearing in the episode, such as Michael Palin and Chris Rock.

The first episode received poor ratings, despite large amounts of advance publicity, including appearing a cover feature for the Radio Times. It attracted 1.6 million viewers (7% of the total audience), the lowest of the five terrestrial channels.
