= Britain's Brightest =

Game show

- Genre: Game show
- Presented by: Clare Balding
- Country of origin: United Kingdom
- Original language: English
- No. of series: 1
- No. of episodes: 6

Production
- Production location: Dock10 studios
- Running time: 60-75 minutes
- Production company: RDF Television

Original release
- Network: BBC One
- Release: 5 January – 9 February 2013

Related
- The Krypton Factor; Britain's Best Brain

Britain's Brightest is a game show that aired on BBC One from 5 January to 9 February 2013 and was hosted by Clare Balding.

== Format ==
Britain's Brightest is an adaptation of the German format Der klügste Deutsche (internationally promoted as The Nation's Brightest). The format is for 24 ordinary people to have their intelligence tested in a variety of ways including memory, speed and emotional intelligence. It is thus similar to other game shows which aimed to test a range of mental faculties such as The Krypton Factor and Britain's Best Brain. The competition is staged as a knock-out in which the winner is the best all-round performer. The contestants compete for a prize of £50,000. There are VTs of Street Science presented by Steve Mould testing the public with science stunts and amazing facts.
