= The Secret Life of 4 Year Olds =

- Genre: Factual; Documentary; Family
- Based on: The Secret Life of 4 and 5 Year Olds
- Directed by: Kate Douglas-Walker
- Narrated by: Carrie Bickmore
- Country of origin: Australia
- Original language: English
- No. of seasons: 1
- No. of episodes: 3

Production
- Executive producers: Emily Griggs; Jennifer Collins
- Producers: Nimah Linnie; Paul Millgate
- Production locations: Sydney, Australia
- Camera setup: Multiple-camera setup
- Running time: 60 minutes (including adverts)
- Production company: Screentime

Original release
- Network: Network Ten
- Release: 12 November – 10 December 2018

The Secret Life of 4 Year Olds is an Australian factual television series based on the British show, The Secret Life of 4 and 5 Year Olds. It premiered on Network Ten on Monday, 12 November at 7:30pm and shows once a week at 7:30pm on Mondays and shows an insight into what a four year old experiences in pre-school, over the period of five weeks.

== Series overview ==
Series	Episodes	Originally released	
Series	Episodes	First released	Last released
1	5	12 November 2018	10 December 2018
