= Village Vets Australia =

- Presented by: Anthony Bennett; James Carroll
- Country of origin: Australia
- Original language: English
- No. of series: 2
- No. of episodes: 14

Production
- Production company: Screentime

Original release
- Network: LifeStyle
- Release: 24 July 2014 – present

Village Vets Australia is an Australian television series starring veterinarians Anthony Bennett and James Carroll. The first series premiered on LifeStyle on 24 July 2014. The second series began airing on 30 July 2015. It is produced by Screentime.

The series was nominated for an award at the 15th Screen Producers Australia Awards.

== Episodes ==
Series	Episodes	Originally released	
Series	Episodes	First released	Last released
1	5	24 July 2014	28 August 2014
2	8	30 July 2015	17 September 2015

=== Series 1 (2014) ===
No.	Title	Original release date	Viewers (millions)	Rank (Night)
1	"Gypsy the Horse & Elsie the Cow"	24 July 2014	63,000	#2
2	"Sarcoid Horse & Bryden's Operation"	31 July 2014	57,000	#4
3	"Tim's Cow"	7 August 2014	69,000	#1
4	"Alpaca Down"	14 August 2014	85,000	#1
5	"Lumpy Dog"	21 August 2014	88,000	#1
6	"Man Flu & Percy's Knee"	28 August 2014	94,000	#1

=== Series 2 (2015) ===
No.	Title	Original release date	Viewers (millions)	Rank (Night)
1	"James and Bailey"	30 July 2015	73,000	#5
2	"Episode 2"	6 August 2015	69,000	#5
3	"Episode 3"	13 August 2015	89,000	#2
4	"Episode 4"	20 August 2015	97,000	#1
5	"Gilligan's Island"	27 August 2015	65,000	#2
6	"Mini Toby"	3 September 2015	82,000	#3
7	"Fiesta's Eye"	10 September 2015	N/A	TBA
8	"Just Dylan"	17 September 2015	75,000	#2

== Books ==
Anthony Bennett and James Carroll went on to write two books, Village Vets and Calving Straps and Zombie Cats, co-authored with writer Mark Whittaker.
