= Claire Harman (actress) =

British actress and voice over artist

- Occupations: Actress, narrator
- Known for: Narrator of Dickinson's Real Deal

Claire Harman is a British actress and narrator, known for narrating the ITV series Dickinson's Real Deal. She also portrayed the lead role in the Brookside DVD Unfinished Business. She has also had a starring role in the second series of Sky TV's Is Harry on the Boat. Harman's other TV credits include Casualty, Doctors, Merseybeat and Coronation Street. Her film credits include About a Boy and Last Orders.

== Filmography ==
=== Film ===
Year	Film	Role	Notes
2000	Sorted	Thames Barrier Girl	
2001	Late Night Shopping	Wendy	
2001	Last Orders	Young Sally	
2002	About a Boy	Skechers Shopgirl	

=== Television ===
Year	Show	Role	Notes
1999	Peak Practice	Cassie Myers	Episode: "Eskimo Roll"
2000	Casualty	Sadie Cassidy	Episode: "Mirror Image"
2000	Doctors	Suzy Parker	Episode: "Crushed"
2000	Urban Gothic	Kate	Episode: "Dead Meat"
2001	Merseybeat	Helen Peterson	Episode: "Step By Step"
2001	Murder Rooms: Mysteries of the Real Sherlock Holmes	Elspeth	1 episode: The Photographer's Chair
2003	Brookside: Unfinished Business	Tanya	DVD
2003	Is Harry on the Boat	Davina Moore	Series regular
2005	Coronation Street	Farrah	1 episode
2006–present	Dickinson's Real Deal	Narrator	Every episode from Series 2
