= In My Time (disambiguation) =

In My Time is the ninth studio album by Greek keyboardist and composer Yanni

In My Time may also refer to:

- In My Time (Gerald Wilson album)
- In My Time: A Personal and Political Memoir, a memoir written by Dick Cheney
- "In My Time", a song by Echo & the Bunnymen from Evergreen (Echo & the Bunnymen album)
