= Screentime =

Australian-based television production company

Screentime Pty Limited
- Type: Subsidiary
- Industry: Television
- Genre: Television production
- Founded: 1996; 30 years ago
- Founders: Bob Campbell; Des Monaghan
- Headquarters: Sydney, Australia
- Area served: Australia, New Zealand, Ireland
- Key people: Bob Campbell (Executive chairman)
- Services: Television program production
- Parent: Banijay Entertainment (2012–present)
- Divisions: Screentime New Zealand
- Website: screentime.com.au

Screentime is an Australian television production company, which develops and produces scripted and unscripted television programs in Australia and New Zealand. The company has produced numerous popular series including Popstars, the Underbelly format, RBT and Janet King.

In 2012, French company Banijay Entertainment acquired a majority stake in Screentime.

== History ==
Former Screentime logo

The company was formed by Bob Campbell and Des Monaghan with Capital Investment Group in 1996. Screentime's first production was New Zealand talk show 5.30 with Jude on TV One which ran for three seasons.

In 1999, Screentime bought the format rights to talent competition Popstars from its New Zealand creator, and went on to sell and co-produce adaptations of the format internationally. In 2002, it was estimated that Screentime earned 20 percent of revenue generated from Popstars: The Rivals.

In April 2001, Screentime's New Zealand production division Screentime New Zealand had merged with Auckland-based New Zealand production company Communicado, a well-known New Zealand independent production house established in 1983 by media executive & journalist Neil Roberts, alongside co-founders Murray Roberts, Garry McAlpine and Robin Scholes, & Screentime New Zealand was renamed to Screentime-Communicado with Communicado's executive Alan Withrington and its co-founder Robin Scholes joining the newly merged Screentime's New Zealand production division Screentime Communicado as joint-managers & co-presidents of Screentime's newly merged production arm Screentime Communicado while Communicado's Paul Holmes & Karen Soich joined the Australian production company Screentime and became board members of its newly merged New Zealand production division Screentime Communicado.

At the end of January 2003, Screentime had started to expand its production business into Europe by taking a 50% majority stake in Dublin-based Irish television production outfit ShinAwil, which had produced the Irish adaptation of Screentime's format Popstars, the buyout of a 50% stake in the Irish production company ShinAwil had gained Screentime an Irish production subsidiary as they formed a production partnerhsip with ShinAwil to create Screentime's Irish joint-venture production arm Screentime ShinAwil that would handle & produce with Screentime's founders Des Monaghan and Bob Campbell as chairman & board member of the newly created joint-venture unit while ShinAwil's founder & president Larry Bass and director Brenda O'Keefe as managing director & director of the joint venture unit. A month later in February of that year, Screentime had appointed former BBC executive & Seven Network head of entertainment and former Network Ten managing director Jacqui Culliton to become Screentime's head of entertainment. Three

In August 2003, Screentime expanded its production to the UK production market by creating a new British distribution joint-venture division with British distribution company ECM International that would distribute Screentime's scripted & non-scripted programming and formats in-house entitled Screentimes Partners with Chris Bonney and David Asher as CEO and CFO of Screentime's newly created British distribution arm Screentime Partners while Screentime's founders Des Monaghan and Bob Campbell became chairman & board member of Screentime's newly formed British distribution division Screentime Partners alongside former ECM senior programming executives Tom McClelland, Maria Rakhmatullina and Belinda Ronalds.

Near the end of September 2006, Screentime had exited the British distribution business & had sold its London-based British international distribution arm Screentime Partners to British production company Shed Productions, giving Shed Productions its own distribution subsidiary & would handle distribution to all of Shed Productions' programming while Screentime continued to license its formats internationally & handle production partnership with other companies.

In 2012, Banijay Group purchased a controlling stake in Screentime, giving Screentime the rights to adapt Banijay formats in Australia. Des Monaghan stood down from his executive position at Screentime in 2014.

In 2015, Screentime sold its 49% stake in Irish production company Shinawil.

In 2019, Screentime partnered with the Screen Makers Conference in Adelaide.

In October 2024, Screentime New Zealand had established a new film & television production studio based in Queenstown that would handle all of Screentime New Zealand's productions in-house called Remarkable Studios NZ, marking Screentime New Zealand's first major film & television production facility, a primary production base and gained Queenstown a new film & television studio. The new film & television production studio Remarkable Studios NZ would handle all of Screentime New Zealand's future projects starting with the crime drama series A Remarkable Place to Die & it became the first production to be filmed at the new studio Remarkable Studios NZ.

== Productions ==
Programs with a shaded background indicate the program is still in production.

Title	Network	Years	Notes	Genre
Breakers	Network Ten	1998–1999	Co-production with Chrysalis Distribution	Scripted
Ten 7 Aotearoa	TVNZ 2	2002–2023		Unscripted
MDA	ABC	2002–2005		Scripted
Ghost Hunt	TVNZ	2005–2006	Co-production with Osiris Productions	Unscripted
Yasmin's Getting Married	Network Ten	2006		Unscripted
Underbelly	Nine Network	2008–2013, 2018, 2022		Scripted
Dragons' Den	RTÉ One	2009		Unscripted
RBT	Nine Network	2010–present		Unscripted
Bloodlines	TVNZ	2010		Scripted
Annabel Langbein: The Free Range Cook	TVNZ 1	2010–2014	Co-production with FremantleMedia and Annabel Langbein Media	Unscripted
MasterChef Ireland	RTÉ Two	2011		Unscripted
Tim Winton's Cloudstreet	Showcase	2011		Scripted
Crownies	ABC	2011		Scripted
Underbelly NZ: Land of the Long Green Cloud	Three	2011		Scripted
Tricky Business	Nine Network	2012		Scripted
Safe House	TVNZ	2012		Scripted
Animal Files	Prime	2013		Unscripted
Water Patrol	TVNZ	2013		Unscripted
Outback Coroner	Crime + Investigation	2013–2014		Unscripted
ANZAC Girls	ABC	2014		Scripted
Janet King	ABC	2014–2017	Spin-off of Crownies	Scripted
Village Vets Australia	Lifestyle	2014–2015		Unscripted
Outback ER	ABC	2015		Unscripted
I Am Innocent	TVNZ 1	2015–2017		Unscripted
How Not to Behave	ABC	2015		Scripted
Stop Laughing...This Is Serious	ABC	2015		Unscripted
Anh's Brush with Fame	ABC	2016–present		Unscripted
You're Back in the Room	TVNZ 2	2016		Unscripted
The Secret Daughter	Seven Network	2016–2017		Scripted
Wolf Creek	Stan	2016–2017	Co-production with Emu Creek Productions	Scripted
Undressed	SBS	2017		Unscripted
Murder Calls Australia	Nine Network	2017		Scripted
Testing Teachers	SBS	2017		Unscripted
Pine Gap	ABC; Netflix	2018		Scripted
Date Night	Nine Network	2018		Unscripted
Straight Forward	Viaplay; TVNZ	2018	Co-production with Mastiff Denmark, Viaplay, TVNZ and Acorn TV	Scripted
Hughesy, We Have a Problem	Network Ten	2018–2021		Unscripted
Playing for Keeps	Network Ten	2018—2019		Scripted
Driving Test Australia	Nine Network	2018		Unscripted
Eat Well for Less Australia	Nine Network	2018		Unscripted
Orange Is the New Brown	Seven Network	2018		Unscripted
The Secret Life of 4 Year Olds	Network Ten	2018		Unscripted
Trial By Kyle	Network Ten	2019		Unscripted
Quimbo's Quest	Network Ten	2019		Scripted
Wife Swap New Zealand	TVNZ	2019		Unscripted
The Gulf	Three; ZDF	2019–present	Co-production with Lippy Pictures and Letterbox Filmproduktion	Scripted
Wife Swap Australia	Seven Network	2019, 2021	Previous season produced by Shine Australia	Unscripted
Informer 3838	Nine Network	2020–present		Scripted
SAS Australia	Seven Network	2020–present		Unscripted
The Hundred with Andy Lee	Nine Network	2021–present		Unscripted
Bali 2002	Stan	2022	Co-production with Endemol Shine Australia	Scripted
The Claremont Murders	Seven Network	2023	Co-production with See Pictures	Scripted
