= Date Night (TV series) =

- Genre: Reality
- Narrated by: Gyton Grantley
- Country of origin: Australia
- Original language: English
- No. of series: 1
- No. of episodes: 10

Production
- Executive producer: Jennifer Collins
- Running time: 30 minutes
- Production company: Screentime

Original release
- Network: Nine Network
- Release: 13 February 2018 – present

Date Night is an Australian reality dating television show which premiered on the Nine Network on 13 February 2018.

== Premise ==
The program follows a bunch of singles from the comfort of their lounge rooms, using a dating app with help from family and friends who comment on the pictures and profiles of fellow daters as they go to help them find the man/woman of their dreams, when they eventually select a person they will go on a date with them.

== Series overview ==
Series	Episodes	Originally released	
Series	Episodes	First released	Last released
1	TBA	13 February 2018	TBA

=== Episodes ===
No. overall	No. in season	Title	Original release date	Australian viewers
1	1	Episode One	13 February 2018	529,000
2	2	Episode Two	20 February 2018	464,000
3	3	Episode Three	27 February 2018	451,000
4	4	Episode Four	6 March 2018	442,000
5	5	Episode Five	13 March 2018	500,000
6	6	Episode Six	20 March 2018	417,000

== International versions ==
Country	Title	Narrator	Network	Premiere	Finale
United Kingdom	Date My Mate	Laura Whitmore	Amazon Prime Video	1 March 2023	
