= When I Was Young =

When I Was Young may refer to:

- "When I Was Young" (song), a 1967 song by Eric Burdon and The Animals
- "When I Was Young", a traditional song arranged by Julie Driscoll performed with Brian Auger and the Trinity from the 1969 album Streetnoise
- "When I Was Young", a jazz composition by Dave Brubek from the 1956 album Brubeck Plays Brubeck
- "When I Was Young", a song by the Kingston Trio from the 1960 album String Along
- "When I Was Young", a song by Nada Surf from the 2012 album The Stars Are Indifferent to Astronomy
- "When I Was Young", a song Akron/Family from the 2013 album Sub Verses
- "When I Was Young", a 1991 single by the River City People
- "When I Was Young", a song by punk/alt-country band Lucero from the 2012 album Women & Work
- When I Was Young (EP), a 2017 EP by MØ
- When I Was Young (album), a 1997 album by Len Graham, Garry Ó Briain and Pádraigín Ní Uallacháin
