= Dickinson's Real Deal =

UK TV programme

- Presented by: David Dickinson
- Narrated by: Claire Harman
- Country of origin: United Kingdom
- Original language: English
- No. of series: 20
- No. of episodes: 1,063

Production
- Running time: ca. 46 minutes (excl. adverts)
- Production company: RDF Television West

Original release
- Network: ITV
- Release: 6 November 2006 – present

Related
- Real Deal

Dickinson's Real Deal is a British antiques and collectables television programme is broadcast on ITV as part of the afternoon schedule. It is presented by David Dickinson. A US version of the show, produced by Zodiak USA and titled simply Real Deal, was aired for one series on the History Channel. The format was the same except that the US show lacked the on-screen host for intervention on the deals.

== Format ==
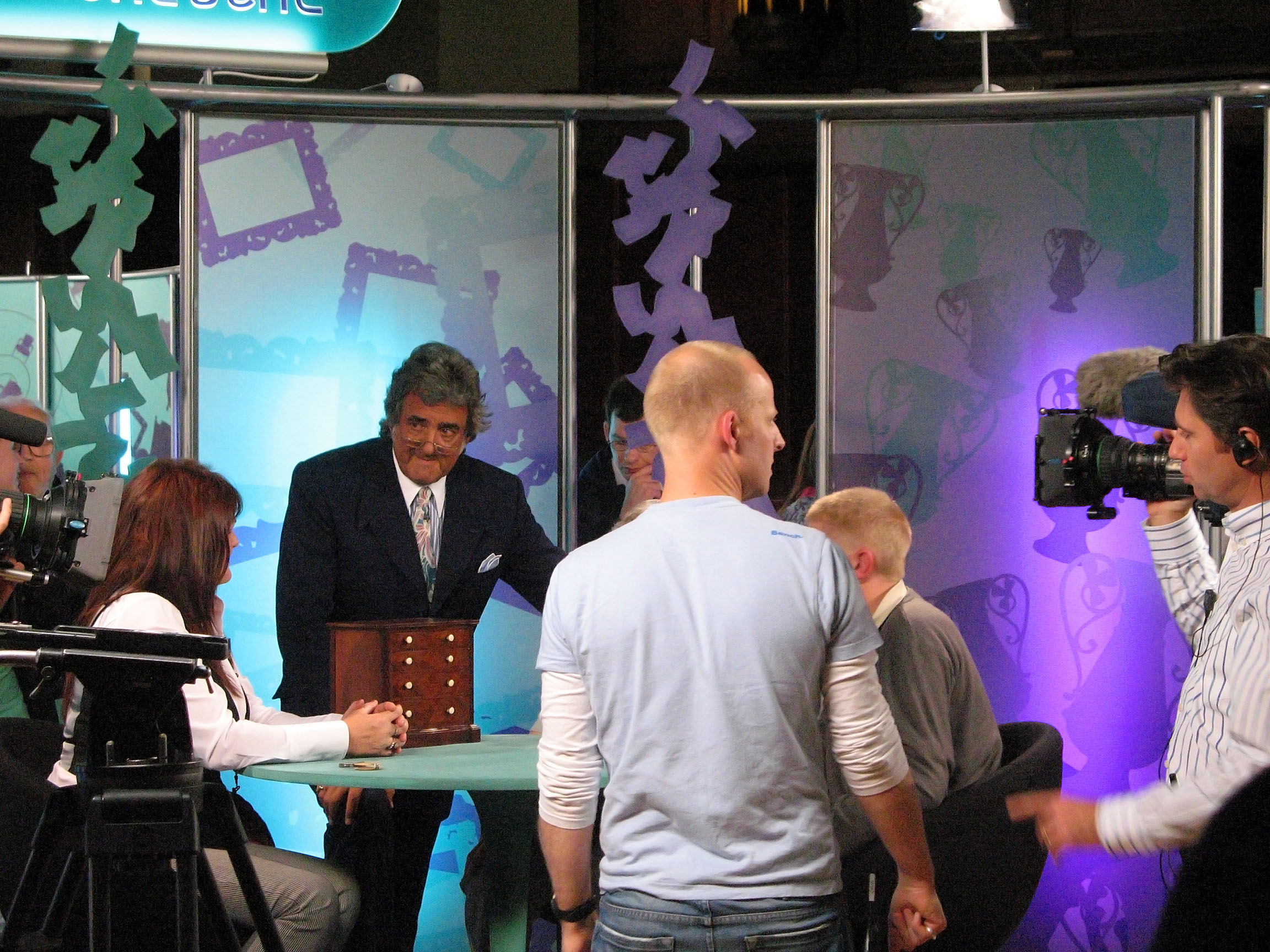
Episode being filmed in 2007

The shows are recorded at UK venues to which members of the public are invited to bring their antiques and collectables. Independent valuers estimate the value of these items.

The items are then passed to the dealers, who make their own valuation and try to purchase them by placing a cash offer on the table. Once the initial offer is placed the sellers will often ask for a higher amount. Then, David Dickinson will often step in to give some advice and reveal the valuers estimations. David, being on the side of the seller, will then haggle with and edge the dealer to give more money. This will quite often lead to the dealer's offer being adjusted. The valuers' estimations are revealed to the owner, the television audience and the dealer.

The seller then decides whether to accept or decline what the dealer has offered. If the deal is declined items go to auction where David can be seen with the seller watching over proceedings in the sale room.
