= Foot 2 Rue =

Animated street football series

- Also known as: Foot 2 Rue (France), La Compagnia dei Celestini (Italy)
- Genre: Animation, sports, children
- Created by: Marco Beretta, Serge Rosenzweig
- Inspired by: La Compagnia dei Celestini by Stefano Benni
- Composer: Akhenaton
- Countries of origin: France, Italy
- No. of seasons: 5
- No. of episodes: 130

Original release
- Network: France 3
- Release: 31 December 2005 – 4 February 2022

Foot 2 Rue (also known as Street Football) is an Italian-French animated television series created by Marco Beretta and Serge Rosenzweig. It originally aired between December 31, 2005, and July 10, 2010, on France 3. Loosely based on the 1992 book La Compagnia dei Celestini by Italian writer Stefano Benni, the show follows a diverse group of five children who form a street football team and find camaraderie through the game.

In July 2019, a fourth season was announced, developed by Zodiak Kids and Monello Productions. It retained the original visual style and premiered in February 2022.

== Synopsis ==
After being abandoned by their parents, five children form a group around street football to build a community. Led by Tag, they aim to compete in a Street Football World Cup together.

== Production and broadcast ==
In a 2023 podcast produced by 20 Minutes, co-creator Giorgio Welter reflected on the intent behind Foot 2 Rue, describing it as one of the first inclusive animated series, meant to represent the lives of children from working-class backgrounds who play football in the streets. The concept for the series was inspired by the Italian novel La Compagnia dei Celestini by Stefano Benni, which follows a group of children escaping an orphanage to join a rebellious street football tournament. The story was adapted into the animated series, which aired in Italy under the title La Compagnia dei Celestini on Rai 2 beginning on November 24, 2005. The Italian version consisted of 26 episodes, each 26 minutes long, and was broadcast daily as part of the children's program Random. It was co-produced by De Mas & Partners, Télé Images, Rai Fiction, and France 3, with animation completed in Milan and Paris.

Under the title Foot 2 Rue in France and Street Football in English-speaking regions, the show gained international distribution. In the United States, the series aired on Primo TV and was streamed in Xfinity On Demand and Xfinity Stream.

The fourth season revival, Foot 2 Rue – Le Retour, was broadcast again on France Télévisions. It was co-produced by Zodiak Kids and Monello Productions and scheduled for release at the end of 2021.

== Video games ==
An official video game, Street Football, was released for the Nintendo DS in 2008. It was covered by gaming outlets such as Pocket Gamer, which noted the game's appeal to fans of the show and its pick-up-and-play accessibility. Additionally, an online browser-based football game tied to the series was made available in 2010 and noted for its interactive appeal for children.

== Reception ==
A 2006 article in Le Parisien described the series as la nouvelle série culte de milliers d'enfants ("the cult series for thousands of children") and un phénomène de mode dans les cours de récré ("a phenomenon in schoolyards"), indicating its strong resonance with young audiences at the time.
