= Real Deal (American TV series) =

2011 documentary American TV series

- Directed by: Adam Vetri
- Narrated by: Tyler Moore
- Country of origin: United States
- No. of series: 1
- No. of episodes: 11

Production
- Executive producers: Rhett Bachner; Carl Lindahl; Claire O'Donohoe; Natalka Znak
- Running time: 30 minutes (inc. adverts)
- Production company: Zodiak USA

Original release
- Network: History
- Release: 27 November – 18 December 2011

Related
- Dickinson's Real Deal (UK version)

Real Deal is an American television series aired on the History channel which premiered in December 2011. The show brings together sellers of antiques, collectables, and historical artifacts with professional buyers. The show is based on the UK TV show Dickinson's Real Deal, except the US show lacks the independent sellers and an on-screen host.

== Format ==
It follows the "sellers" who try to pitch their items to the "dealers". The dealers will offer an amount after a brief evaluation of the item, based on their professional evaluation and years of experience. After debating on the price, the seller can accept the cash offer, or choose to go to auction and potentially lose money or exceed the dealer's offer. The auction is hosted at Don Presley's auction house in Anaheim, CA.

== Season 1 (2011) ==
The first season had a wide variety of items presented to the dealers, including a restored gas pump, Native American artifacts, a collection of autographed footballs, an electroshock therapy unit, antique bicycles, a woolly mammoth tooth, comic books, a 1960s MK II Lincoln and a brass spitoon from a Nevada mine and brothel. Some sellers took the cash offers, others opted to roll the dice and go to auction. Many of the sellers ended up with a much smaller auction price, while others sold their items for a little to a lot more than the dealers' offer.

== The Dealers ==
Name	Job	Company	From
Chip Plemmons	Pawnbroker	Carolina Pawn & Gun	Canton, NC
Glen Parshall	Pawnbroker, coin & gun dealer, firearms instructor	Bargain Pawn	Las Vegas, NV
Jason McCoon	Auctioneer, Collectables dealer	Tory Hill Auctions	Raleigh, NC
Troy Howerton	Picker	'The Red Neck Picker'	San Diego, CA

== The Auctioneer ==
Name	Company	From
Bryan Knox	BCK Auctions	Gardendale, AL

== Future ==
As of February 2012, the full episodes have been removed from History's website and no further episodes are planned to be aired. The show appears to have been cancelled.
