= Rai Kids =

Italian animated production company

- Formerly: Rai Ragazzi (2010–2022)
- Industry: Television
- Founded: April 27, 2010; 16 years ago
- Products: animation
- Owner: RAI
- Parent: RAI

Rai Kids (formerly called Rai Ragazzi in Italian) is an Italian production company based in Turin. It is owned and operated by Radiotelevisione italiana (RAI), the national broadcasting company of Italy.

The company produces shows for children and is directed by Luca Milano, former deputy director of Rai Fiction.

== History ==
In April 2017, Rai Kids' parent company Rai restructured their children's programming had merged the animation and children's drama production units of Rai Kids' fellow division Rai Fiction with RAI's own children channels Rai Yoyo and Rai Gulp into one production division named Rai Ragazzi becoming the main in-house production, acquisitions and co-producer of Rai's animated and children's drama programmes as former head of animation at Rai Fiction Luca Milano heading the new structure as director.

== Filmography ==
Title	Years	Network	Notes
Seven and Me	2016–2019	Rai Gulp; France 3 (France)	inherited from Rai Fiction co-production with Method Animation, AB Productions, DQ Entertainment, Nexus Factory and ZDF Enterprises
Pat the Dog	2017–2021	Rai Gulp; Télétoon+ & Canal+ Family/France 4 & Disney Channel France (France)	inherited from Rai Fiction co-production with Superprod Animation, Superprod Studio (season 2), Animoka Studios, Grid Animation (season 1) and Rai Com (season 1)
Penny on M.A.R.S.	2018–2020	Rai Gulp; Disney Channel & Disney+ (Worldwide)	co-production with The Walt Disney Company Italy, 3Zero2 and LS Distribution (season 3); Co-owned with The Walt Disney Company
44 Cats	2018–2021	Rai Yoyo; Nickelodeon (International)	co-production with Rainbow
Club 57	2019–2021	Rai Gulp; Nickelodeon (United States)	co-production with Rainbow, Nickelodeon Productions and Cinemat
Winx Club	2019	Rai Yoyo	inherited from Rai Fiction; Season 8; co-production with Rainbow
Ricky Zoom	2019–2021	Rai Yoyo; Gulli (France); Youku Kids (China)	co-production with Entertainment One, Frog Box, Maga Animation Studio, TeamTO and Youku Kids
Berry Bees	2019–2020	Rai Gulp; 9Go! (Australia)	co-production with SLR Productions, Atlantyca Entertainment, Telegael and Cosmos-Maya Animation
Alice & Lewis	2020–present	Rai Yoyo; TF1 (France)	co-production with Blue Spirit Productions and MoBo Digital Factory
Topo Gigio	2020–present	Rai Yoyo	co-production with Movimenti Production and Topo Giglo s.r.l.
Lupin's Tales	2021–present	Rai Yoyo; France 5 (France); Youku (China)	Originally entitled Tiny Bad Wolf co-production with Xilam Animation and Maga Animation Studio
When I Was Your Age	2021	Rai Gulp; France 4 (France)	co-production with Monello Productions and MoBo Digital Factory
Street Football	2022–present	Rai Gulp; France 4 & Canal J (France)	inherited from Rai Fiction; Season 4; co-production with Zodiak Kids & Family France, Monello Productions and Maga Animation Studio
The Enchanted Village of Pinocchio	2022	Rai Yoyo; France 5 (France)	co-production with Method Animation, Palomar and ZDF Studios
Hello Kitty: Super Style!	2022–2024	Rai Yoyo; Canal+ Kids (France)	Previously known as The World of Hello Kitty co-production with Watch Next Media, Monello Productions, Maga Animation Studio and Sanrio
Home Sweet Rome	2023	Rai Gulp; Family Channel	co-production with Red Monk Studio, First Generation Films and Michael Poryes Productions
The Little Prince and Friends	2023–present	Rai Yoyo; France 5 (France); WDR (Germany); Gloob (Brazil)	co-production with Method Animation, Bidibul Productions and LPPTV
Grisù	2023–present	Rai YoYo & Rai Play; Kika (Germany)	co-production with Mondo TV, Mondo TV France, Toon2Tango and ZDF Studios
Miniheroes of the Forest	2024–present	Rai Yoyo; France 5 (France)	co-production with Movimenti Production, MoBo Digital Factory and Zodiak Kids & Family France
Super Happy Magic Forest	2024–present	Rai Gulp; CBBC (United Kingdom); ZDF (Germany); Canal+ Kids (France)	co-production with Tiger Aspect Kids & Family, Monello Productions, Movimenti Production, Zodiak Kids & Family France and ZDF Studios
Alex Player	2024–present	Rai Gulp; France 4 (France)	co-production with Cyber Group Studios, Graphilm Entertainment and Scrawl Animation
Piripenguins	2025–present	Rai Yoyo; CBeebies (United Kingdom); ABC (Australia)	co-production with Eaglet Films, Red Monk Studio, Banijay Kids & Family Distribution and PBS Distribution
Winx Club: The Magic Is Back	2025–present	Rai channels Netflix (International)	co-production with Rainbow
Underdog and the Canine Defenders	2025–present	Rai Gulp; Gulli & M6 (France)	co-production with Superprod Animation, Red Monk Studio, Classic Media and DeAPlaneta Entertainment
