= ZDF Studios =

German production & distribution company

- Formerly: ZDF Enterprises (1993–2022)
- Type: Subsidiary
- Founded: January 1, 1993; 33 years ago
- Key people: Markus Schäefer (president and CEO)
- Parent: ZDF
- Divisions: ZDF Sparks
- Subsidiaries: Bavaria Fiction (50%); DocLights; Gruppe 5 Filmprodukktion; Nadcom Film (49%); Network Film
- Website: www.zdf-studios.com

ZDF Studios GmbH (formerly known as ZDF Enterprises, stylised as ZDF.enterprises) is a wholly owned German production and distribution subsidiary of the German television network ZDF that is known for the creation and exploitation of ZDF's programming internationally outside of Germany. They also handled programming acquisitions, co-productions and distribution with other production companies around the world. It was founded in 1993. Until March 31, 2022, it was known as ZDF Enterprises. It is located at the ZDF broadcasting center in Mainz-Lerchenberg and had three offices in Munich, Cologne and New York.

== History ==
On January 27, 2000, ZDF Enterprises had established a new subsidiary based in its main headquarters at Mainz entitled ZDF.New Media with ZDF Enterprises's head of marketing & sales Peter Lang serving as co-president and Dirk Max Johns as president of content & multimedia products serving and co-president of the new unit.

On May 11, 2001, ZDF Enterprises had entered the theme park business and greenlighted to create a theme park near its headquarters in Mainz named the ZDF Theme Park that would bring ZDF's programming catalogue into 3D attraction adaptations with theme park developer MPEG and the Mainz City Council developing documents for ZDF's theme park while ZDF Enterprises' partner Flebbe Group will be running ZDF's new theme park in Mainz.

In 2002, ZDF Enterprises entered a worldwide production partnership with Australian television production company Jonathan M. Shiff Productions to develop children's television series with ZDF Enterprises would co-produce & handle worldwide distribution to the upcoming television series produced by Jonathan M. Shiff Productions outside of Australia and New Zealand, ZDF Enterprises' partnership with Jonathan M. Shiff Productions started with the successful television series H2O: Just Add Water; their partnership would later be expanded seven years later in June 2009.

In July 2007, ZDF Enterprises announced they had acquired a 50% majority stake in Bavaria Film's independent television production subsidiary Bavaria Fernsehproduktion. The latter's previous parent, major German film production and distribution company Bavaria Film, spun off their television production arm into an independent subsidiary within Bavaria Film, in order for them to become a management holding company. The acquisition of a 50% stake by ZDF Enterprises had turned Bavaria Film's television subsidiary, Bavaria Fernsehproduktion, into a joint-venture production subsidiary, with ZDF Enterprises co-producing and handling international distribution of the company's projects outside of Germany.

In January 2011, ZDF Enterprises acquired a 49% minority stake in factual entertainment and documentary production division Studio Hamburg DocLights from NDR's Hamburg-based film and television production and service company Studio Hamburg Production Group (who they founded the division one year earlier in 2010), establishing a partnership with the two production companies. The former would co-prooduce and distribute Studio Hamburg Doclights' productions, as Studio Hamburg Production Group continued to hold a 51% stake in documentary division Studio Hamburg DocLights, alongside Jörn Röver, Michaela Hummel and Andreas Knoblauch, who continued to head the factual studio as CEOs.

In late-January 2012, ZDF Enterprises (who bought Studio Hamburg's documentary division Studio Hamburg Doclights in January 2011) established a joint-venture distribution sales unit with NDR's Hamburg-based film and television production and service company Studio Hamburg Production Group, called Studio Hamburg Enterprises. This joint-venture distribution company acquired rights to ZDF Enterprises' programming catalogue, including the ZDF and ARD libraries, with the two companies handling 50% of their joint-venture distribution unit. ZDF Enterprises' head of merchandising and ZDF shops Peter Lang and Studio Hamburg's head of home entertainment Jens Uwe Welge led the joint-venture distribution sales unit. The two production and distribution companies, ZDF Studios (which was renamed from ZDF Enterprises) and Studio Hamburg Production Group, rebranded their joint-venture distribution unit as OneGate Media ten years later in September 2022, with the name referencing the latter's roots in Hamburg.

In late-June 2014, ZDF Enterprises teamed up with award-winning producer & professor Uwe Kersken to form a joint-venture production outfit named G5 Fiction based in Colonge that would produce scripted international drama with ZDF Enterprises as the new joint-venture production outfit G5 Fiction would focus on historical drama.

On June 6, 2017, ZDF Enterprises expanded their operations into the UK distribution market by acquiring a 32% minority stake in British factual production and distribution company World Media Rights. This marked ZDF Enterprises' first investment in the British production and distribution company outside of Germany. World Media Rights CEO Allan Griffiths continued as CEO of the British factual production and distribution company through ZDF Enterprises.

In January 2019, ZDF Enterprises expanded their operations into the Netherlands by announcing their acquisition of Dutch unscripted production and distribution company Off the Fence, thus giving ZDF Enterprises their own Dutch production and distribution subsidiary. Off the Fence's CEO and founder Ellen Windemuth continued operating the company under ZDF Enterprises. Two weeks later on the 28th of that month, ZDF Enterprises had acquired a 49% majority stake in Colonge-based crime drama film & television production and development company Nadcom Film from German mini-major & film distribution company Constantin Film, the acquisition of a 49% majority stake in Colonge-based German film & television production company Nadcon Film had led to Scandinavian film producer & former ZDF Enterprises executive Peter Nadermann returning to ZDF Enterprises while he continued to hold his 51% stake in Nadcon Film & retained his role of managing director.

In October 2021, ZDF Enterprises had further expanded its production partnership with Studio Hamburg Production Group by forming scripted programming with ZDF Enterprises & Studio Hamburg Production Group had increased their production partnership into the scripted production portfolio had brought in a 49% stake in Studio Hamberg Production Group's drama production subsidiary Real Film, effectively becoming a subsidiary of ZDF Enterprises while Studio Hamburg Production Group had retained a 51% stake in Real Film.

In April 2022, a day after the rebranding of ZDF Enterprises to ZDF Studios, ZDF Studios announced a partnership with Belgian production and distribution group Studio 100 through the latter's Munich-based German international distribution division Studio 100 Media (now Studio 100 International) to jointly launch a new international channel brand. This would bring ZDF Studios' kids & family programming library, such as Australian television series H2O: Just Add Water and Find Me in Paris, with Studio 100's kids & family programming catalogue under one streaming channel brand, Pash. This was launched on Amazon Prime Channels in the UK, Italy and Spain, with the two companies planning to launch their joint venture channel brand in other territories. Three years later in late-September 2025, ZDF Studios had expanded its streaming international content pact with Belgian production group Studio 100 through its Studio 100 International for their joint-venture streaming service Pash, with programming from both ZDF Studios & Studio 100 International being available on ZDF Studios' own pay-streaming service ZDF Select and ZDF's own streaming app & online platform ZDFtivi

In April 2023, ZDF Studios had colloaborated with former South&Browse founder & managing director, Tom Gamlich, and former executive producer of South&Browse's Fictual unit, Jan Fritzowsky, to establish a new factual production subsidiary based in Munich that is dedicated to high quality-factual entertainment formats, entitled Content Laden, the new factual entertainment subsidiary would produce facutal programming with Tom Gamlich and Jan Fritzowsky becoming co-CEOs, managing director and creative director of the newly launched subsidiary Content Laden.

In October 2023, ZDF Studios had partnered with Atlanta-based American media development and distribution company Castalia Communications to establish a new FAST channel in Latin America that would feature drama programming from ZDF Studios' catalogue. Two years later on May 1, 2025, following the announcement of a new FAST channel by ZDF Studios and its Atlanta-based American media development and distribution company & partner Castalia Communications, ZDF Studios & Atlanta-based American media development & distribution company Castalia Communications had revealed its FAST channel crime drama-based Spanish-language FAST channel in Mexico called Criminen ZDF which brings ZDF Studios' crime drama-based programming including its long-running SOKO franchise & the long-running drama series The Old Fox dubbed in Spanish for Spanish-speaking audiences for the United States and Latin America as the new FAST channel Criminen ZDF became available on Samsung TV Plus in Mexico

In December 2023, ZDF Studios had established its in-house AI agency division called ZDF Sparks, the new AI agency division will be based in Berlin & would handle development and managing AI tools for its parent & network ZDF with digital technology and AI expert Dr. Pirita Pyykkönen-Klauck heading the new division ZDF Sparks as CEO.

In June 2025, ZDF Studios announced that its Dutch production/distribution subsidiary Off the Fence had entered bankruptcy proceedings after struggling to remain financially viable and when they had filed for a suspension of payments, which a court-appointed administrator quickly converted into bankruptcy proceedings with Off the Fence's management alongside ZDF Studios declaired that long-standing global industry weakness as the primary cause for the financial collapse.

In August 2025, ZDF Studios signed a multi-year content licensing agreement with The Walt Disney Company's streaming service Disney+ to bring ZDF Studios' film & television programming library including its prominent long-running family-friendly & crime dramas like Der Bergdoktor, What a Team!, Nord Nord Mord and internationally recognized kids & family hits such as H2O: Just Add Water, Theodosia and Find Me in Paris on the streaming service for Disney+ subscribers in Germany, Austria and Switzerland with Disney+ created a curated collection for ZDF Studios' film & television programming catalogue entitled ZDF Films and Series and the new collection would bring selected new seasons after their broadcast on ZDF.

In March 2026, ZDF Studios expanded its factual programming partnetship with British production & digital media network Little Dot Studios with the British digital media network licensing ZDF Studios' German and English-language programming catalogue on Little Dot's genre-based digital YouTube channels alongside FAST platforms for the German-speaking and international markets.

== Filmography ==
=== Television ===
Title	Years	Network	Notes
Tabaluga	1997–2004	ZDF; Seven Network (Australia)	co-production with Yoram Gross-EM.TV, EM.Entertainment and Victory Media Group
Pablo the Little Red Fox	1999–2000	ZDF; La Cinquième & Disney Channel France (France); BBC One/BBC Two (United Kingdom)	co-production with Millimages, HIT Entertainment and Red Fox Productions
Talis and the Thousand Tasks	2002	Kika; France 3 (France); ORF 1 (Austria)	co-production with Millimages and Cine Cartoon
Laura's Star	2002–2011	ZDF; SF 1 (Switzerland)	co-production with Rothkirch-Cartoon Film (season 1), Bauhaus Medien (season 1), Mondo TV (seasons 2–3) and Mondo Igel Media (seasons 2–3)
Metalheads	2003–2004	ZDF; CBBC (United Kingdom)	co-production with TV-Loonland AG and Telemagination Productions; Rights held by Studio 100 International
Wicked Science	2004–2006	Network Ten (Australia)	co-production with Jonathan M. Shiff Productions
Dragon	2004–2007	ZDF; Treehouse TV (Canada); EBS (South Korea)	co-production with Cite-Amerique, Scopas Medien and Image Plus
Shaolin Wuzang	2005–2006	ZDF; France 3 (France); Jetix Europe; TV 2 (Denmark)	co-production with Les Cartooneurs Associés and Fantasia Animation; Owned by Mediatoon Distribution
H2O: Just Add Water	2006–2010	Kika; Network Ten (Australia)	co-production with Jonathan M. Shiff Productions
Rudi & Trudi	2006–2007	ZDF; Channel 4 (United Kingdom)	co-production with TV-Loonland AG and Telemagination; Co-owned with Studio 100
The Killing	2007–2012	DR1 (Denmark)	co-production with DR
Rahan: Son of the Dark Age	2008–2009	Kika; Canal+ Family & France 3 (France); Rai Gulp (Italy)	co-production with Xilam Animation, Rai Fiction and Castelrosso Films
Fun with Claude	2009	ZDF; Playhouse Disney UK (United Kingdom)	co-production with Dot to Dot Productions, Red & Blue Productions and Dinamo Productions
Igam Ogam	2009–2013	ZDF; Channel 5 & S4C (United Kingdom)	co-production with Calon and Telegael (season 2)
Le Petit Nicolas	2009–2010	ZDF; M6 (France)	co-production with Method Animation, M6 Studio, LuxAnimation and DQ Entertainment
Millennium	2010	SVT1	co-production with Yellow Bird, Nordisk Film, SVT and Film i Väst
Dance Academy	2010–2013	ZDF; ABC1/ABC3 (Australia)	co-production with Werner Film Productions and Australian Children's Television Foundation
The Jungle Book	2010–2020	ZDF; TF1/Piwi+ (France)	co-production with DQ Entertainment, MoonScoop (seasons 1–2), Ellipsanime Productions (season 3) and Les Cartooneurs Associés (season 3)
Sherlock Yack	2011–2012	ZDF/Kika; TF1 (France)	co-production with Mondo TV France
Frühling	2011–present	ZDF	co-production with Seven Dogs Filmproduktion and UFA Fiction
My Phone Genie	2012	Kika; CITV (United Kingdom)	co-production with MoonScoop, Talent Television and Telegael; Owned by Mediatoon Distribution
Lightning Point	2012	Kika; Network Ten (Australia)	co-production with Jonathan M. Shiff Productions
The New Adventures of Peter Pan	2012–2016	ZDF; France 3 (France)	co-production with Method Animation, DQ Entertainment, Story Board Animation and De Agostini Editore; Co-owned with Mediawan Kids & Family Distribution
The Fall	2013–2016	ZDFneo; BBC Two (United Kingdom); RTÉ One (Ireland)	co-production with Artists Studio and Fabels Limited; Co-distributed with Banijay Rights
Reef Doctors	2013	Network Ten/Eleven	co-production with Jonathan M. Shiff Productions
Mako: Island of Secrets	2013–2016	ZDF; Network Ten/Eleven (Australia); Netflix (Worldwide)	A spin-off of H2O: Just Add Water by Jonathan M. Shiff co-production with Jonathan M. Shiff Productions
Wendy	2013–2014	ZDF	co-production with Red Kite Animation and August Media
The New Adventures of Lassie	2014–2020	ZDF; TF1 (France)	co-production with DreamWorks Classics, Superprod Animation and DQ Entertainment (season 1); Rights co-owned with Superights Kids & Family
The Skinner Boys: Guardians of the Lost Secrets	2014–2017	Super RTL; 9Go! (Australia)	co-production with SLR Productions, Telegael Teoranta, Home Plate Entertainment (season 1) and Top Draw Animation (season 1)
Sam Fox: Extreme Adventures	2014–2015	Eleven (Australia)	co-production with SLR Productions and Kojo
H2O: Mermaid Adventures	2015	ZDF; France 3 (France); Netflix (Worldwide)	co-production with Les Cartooneurs Associés, Jonathan M. Shiff Productions and Fantasia Animation; Based on the live-action series H2O: Just Add Water by Jonathan M. Shiff; Rights co-owned with Mediatoon Distribution
Bettys Diagnose	2015–present	ZDF	co-production with Network Movie and Film- und Fernsehproduktion GmbH & Co KG
Captain Flinn and the Pirate Dinosaurs	2015	Kika; 9Go! (Australia)	co-production with SLR Productions, Telegael and Top Draw Animation
Robin Hood: Mischief in Sherwood	2015–2019	ZDF; TF1 (France); Disney Channel France (France) (seasons 1–2)	co-production with Method Animation, DQ Entertainment (seasons 1–2), Fabrique D'Images (season 1), De Agostini Editore (season 1) and KidsMe (season 3)
Scream Street	2015–present	Kika; CBBC (United Kingdom)	co-production with Coolabi Productions
Ku'damm 56	2016–2021	ZDF	co-production with UFA Fiction
Seven and Me	2016–2019	ProSieben; France 3 (France); Rai Gulp (Italy)	co-production with Method Animation, AB Productions, DQ Entertainment, Nexus Factory and Rai Fiction
Find Me in Paris	2018–2020	ZDF; Disney Channel France & France 4 (France); Disney Channel Italy (Italy); Hulu (United States); ABC Me (Australia)	co-production with Cottonwood Media, BE-Films, UMedia, and Paris Opera; Co-distributed with Federation Kids & Family
The Bureau of Magical Things	2018–2021	Kika/ZDF; Eleven/10 Shake (Australia)	co-production with Jonathan M. Shiff Productions
Apollo's Tall Tales	2019	ZDF; France 5 & TiJi (France)	co-production with Method Animation, Bidibul Productions and PGS Entertainment
Heirs of the Night	2019–2020	NDR & Kika; NRK1 (Norway); NPO 3 (Netherlands)	co-production with Lemming Film, Hamster Film, Maze Pictures, Maipo Film and Scope Pictures
Agent Hamilton	2020–2022	ZDFneo; C More & TV 4 (Sweden)	co-production with Dramacorp Pampas Studios and Kärnfilm
Dead Still	2020	Acorn TV; CityTV (Canada)	co-production with Shaftesbury Films and Deadpan Pictures
Space Nova	2021–present	Super RTL; 9Go & ABC ME/ABC Family (Australia)	co-production with SLR Productions, Giggle Garbage and Australian Children's Television Foundation
Huss	2021	ZDF; Viaplay (Scandinavia); Kanal 5 (Sweden)	co-production with Yellow Bird
ANA. all in	2021	RTVE Play (Spain)	co-production with DeAPlaneta and Tornasol
Stories to Stay Awake	2021–2022	Amazon Prime Video	co-production with ViacomCBS International Studios and Isla Audiovisual; Co-distributed by Paramount Global Content Distribution
Theodosia	2022–present	ZDF; Salto/France 4 (France); HBO Max/BYUtv (United States); Globoplay (Brazil)	co-production with Cottonwood Media, BE-Films and UMedia; Co-owned with Federation Kids & Family
Silverpoint	2022–present	ZDF; CBBC (United Kingdom)	co-production with Zodiak Kids & Family Productions UK; Co-owned with Banijay Kids & Family Distribution
The Enchanted Village of Pinocchio	2022	France 5 (France); Rai Yoyo (Italy)	co-production with Method Animation, Palomar and Rai Ragazzi
Surviving Summer	2022–2023	Netflix	co-production with Werner Film Productions
Runes	2022	Canal+ (France); KIKA/ZDF (Germany)	co-production with Les Armateurs and Blue Spirit Productions
Spellbound	2023–present	ZDF; France 4 (France); Hulu (United States)	co-production with Cottonwood Media; Co-owned with Federation Kids & Family
Grisù	2023–present	Kika; Rai Yoyo & Rai Play (Italy)	co-production with Mondo TV, Mondo TV France and Toon2Tango
Pirate Academy	2024–present	Kika; M6 & Canal J (France)	co-production with Method Animation, Toonz Entertainment, Telegael and KidsMe; Rights owned by Mediawan Kids & Family Distribution
Super Happy Magic Forest	2024–present	ZDF CBBC (United Kingdom); Rai Yoyo (Italy); Canal+ (France)	co-production with Tiger Aspect Kids & Family, Monello Productions, Movimenti Production, Zodiak Kids & Family France and Rai Kids
The 3 Musketeers	2025–present	ZDF; France 4 (France); Rai Gulp (Italy)	co-production with Method Animation, Palomar and Rai Kids; Rights owned by Mediawan Kids & Family Distribution
Weiss & Morales	2025	ZDF; La 1 (Spain)	co-production with Portocabo and Nadcon
Black Death Patient Zero	2025	ZDF; Arte (France); Sky History (United Kingdom); WNET (United States)	co-production with Impossible Factual
Troy Story: The Schliemann Legacy	2025	ZDF; Arte (France); Sky History (United Kingdom)	co-production with Impossible Factual
The Lady Grace Mysteries	2026–present	Kika & ZDF; CBBC (United Kingdom); France 4 & Okoo (France)	co-production with Cottonwood Media and Coolabi Productions
Benidorm Is Murder	2026	5	Originally titled Death in Benidorm; co-production with Clapperboard Studios and Blackbox Multimedia
Wild Science	TBA	3sat; Love Nature (International)	co-production with Blue Ant Studios and Big Media
By Bunny	TBA	TVO, TFO, Knowledge Kids & Radio-Canada Television (Canada)	co-production with Sphere Media, Telegael, Mesmor Studios and Anaganaga Pictures

=== Film ===
Title	Release date	Distributor	Notes
Talk of the Town	26 October 1995	Buena Vista International	co-production with Studio Hamburg Production
The Girl with the Dragon Tattoo	27 February 2009 (Sweden and Denmark); 1 October 2009 (Germany)	NFP Marketing & Distribution; Nordisk Film (Sweden and Denmark)	co-production with Yellow Bird, Nordisk Film, Filmpool Stockholm-Mälardalen, Sveriges Television, ZDF, Film i Väst and Spiltan Underhållning
The Girl Who Played with Fire	18 September 2009 (Sweden and Denmark); 4 February 2010 (Germany)	NFP Marketing & Distribution; Nordisk Film (Sweden and Denmark)	co-production with Yellow Bird, Nordisk Film, Filmpool Stockholm-Mälardalen, Sveriges Television, ZDF, Film i Väst and Spiltan Underhållning
The Girl Who Kicked the Hornets' Nest	27 November 2009 (Sweden and Denmark); 3 June 2010 (Germany)	NFP Marketing & Distribution; Nordisk Film (Sweden and Denmark)	co-production with Yellow Bird, Nordisk Film, Filmpool Stockholm-Mälardalen, Sveriges Television, ZDF, Film i Väst and Spiltan Underhållning
The Four Times	28 May 2010 (Italy)	Cinecittà Luce (Italy)	Invisibile Film, Ventura Film, Vivo Film, Coproduction Office, Caravan Pass and Altamarea Film
Dance Academy: The Comeback	April 7, 2017	ZDF Enterprises; StudioCanal (Australia)	co-production with Werner Film Productions, StudioCanal and Australian Children's Television Foundation
Alice-Miranda Friends Forever	December 2, 2019	ZDF Enterprises; ABC Commercial (Australia)	co-production with SLR Productions
Alice-Miranda: A Royal Christmas Ball	October 15, 2021	ZDF Enterprises; ABC Commercial (Australia)	co-production with SLR Productions
