= Mr. Bean: The Animated Series =

British animated series

- Genre: Animated series Comedy; Slapstick
- Created by: Rowan Atkinson
- Based on: Mr. Bean by: Rowan Atkinson; Richard Curtis
- Directed by: Richard Purdum (series 1); Tim Fehrenbach (series 2); Dave Osborne (series 3–4); Filippo Cigognini (series 4)
- Voices of: Rowan Atkinson; Sally Grace; Matilda Ziegler
- Composers: Howard Goodall; John Greswell ("Bean Hypnotised")
- Country of origin: United Kingdom
- Original language: English
- No. of series: 4
- No. of episodes: 182 + 1 special (list of episodes)

Production
- Executive producers: Rowan Atkinson; Katherine Senior (series 3); Peter Bennett-Jones (series 1–2); Christopher Skala (series 2); Claudia Lloyd (series 2); Tom Beattie (series 4)
- Producers: Jill Thomas (series 1); Claudia Lloyd (series 1); Tom Beattie (series 2–3); Christopher Skala (series 3); Arnold Widdowson (series 4)
- Editors: Mark Edwards (series 1); Thomas Ernst (series 1); Zsolt Iván Varga (series 1); Zoltán Varga H.S.E. (series 1); Ivan Varga (series 1); Graham Silcock (series 2–3); Luke Robinson (series 2); Adam Dymond (series 4)
- Running time: 3-11 minutes
- Production companies: Tiger Aspect Productions (series 1–3) (Note: Animation outsourced to Varga Holdings in series 1); Richard Purdum Productions (series 1); Tiger Aspect Kids & Family (series 4) (Note: Animation outsourced to Movimenti Production.)

Original release
- Network: ITV
- Release: 2 March 2002 – 30 August 2003
- Network: CITV
- Release: 5 October – 1 November 2004
- Release: 16 February 2015 – 8 October 2019
- Network: ITVX, Boomerang
- Release: 1 May 2025 – present

Mr. Bean: The Animated Series is a British animated sitcom produced by Tiger Aspect Productions in association with Richard Purdum Productions and Varga Holdings (for the first series). Based on the live-action television sitcom of the same title created by Rowan Atkinson and Richard Curtis, the sitcom centres on Mr. Bean (Atkinson), Teddy, Irma Gobb (Matilda Ziegler), the Reliant Regal's mysterious driver, Mrs. Wicket (Sally Grace) and her cat Scrapper. In February 2001, the series was officially announced, with it premiering shortly afterwards.

Debuting on 2 March 2002 and originally ending on 1 November 2004, the first series, featuring 52 episodes in total, was originally broadcast on ITV in a Saturday night slot. In October 2004, the sitcom left the Saturday night slot and was instead broadcast daily on CITV due to the show's popularity with younger audiences.

In July 2013, Studio-43 were brought to the light of Tiger-Aspect for the idea of a new animated series so that they could animate the series, but it wasn't until January 2014 that CITV publicly announced that a new animated series would be made, with Rowan Atkinson once again providing his voice for the role. 52 new episodes began airing on CITV.

In 2018, Tiger Aspect served up the third series, which began airing on CITV in the UK and across international markets on Boomerang and other Turner Kids channels in select markets on 9 April 2019.

In 2024, it was announced that the series had been commissioned for a fourth run, produced by Tiger Aspect Kids & Family, in partnership with Warner Bros. Discovery and ITVX, through deals agreed by Banijay Rights.

== Cast and characters ==
=== Main ===
The show's characters and props. From left to right: Mr. Bean, Teddy, Mrs. Wicket, Scrapper, Miss Wince, Irma Gobb, and Mr. Bean's Mini.

- Mr. Bean (voiced by Rowan Atkinson) – The title character. He is a childish, self-absorbed and extremely competitive individual living in London who is almost always dressed in his trademark sport jacket and a thin red tie, and often brings various abnormal schemes and contrivances to everyday tasks (like his live-action counterpart). Despite this, he is depicted in the animated series as more competent and less buffoonish than his live-action counterpart. In addition, he often talks in complete sentences (particularly in the later series) compared to his live-action counterpart, who rarely spoke a few mumbled words that are all in a comically low-pitched voice.
- Teddy – Mr. Bean's personal teddy bear and lifelong best friend. Despite being inanimate, Bean pretends that Teddy is alive (like in the original live-action sitcom).
- Mrs. Wicket (voiced by Sally Grace) – Mr. Bean's elderly and grouchy landlady, who often despises Bean and his antics, though deep down, she does have a soft spot for him (which becomes more prominent in the later series). Running gags include her screaming loudly during bad situations, often scaring birds outside the flat, and slamming Bean's door causing glass-framed pictures and other objects hung on the wall to fall and break. As revealed in the episode "Young Bean", the reason she hates Bean is that, when he was young, he accidentally ruined her wedding by riding his go-kart down a hill and crashing into her and her groom. In the first series, she often plays a villainous role, but acts much nicer beginning in the second series.
- Scrapper – Mrs. Wicket's vicious, ill-tempered one-eyed pet cat who, much like his owner, despises Mr. Bean, never missing an opportunity to put him in trouble.
- Miss Mary Wince – Mrs. Wicket's best friend, who often stops by her flat for tea and watches wrestling with her. Her first name is revealled in the episode "A Royal Makeover". She generally treats Mr. Bean with more respect than Mrs. Wicket, and they get on better together than him and the latter. While often mistreated by Mrs. Wicket, they remain as companions throughout the series.
- Irma Gobb (voiced by Matilda Ziegler) – Mr. Bean's long-suffering girlfriend, who debuted in the live action version's episode The Curse of Mr. Bean. Like her original live-action counterpart, Irma is depicted as more intelligent and significantly less buffoonish than Bean, which often results in her having an often-strained relationship with the latter. She is also depicted as a worker at a local library in series 2, while she later works at a market selling woolly clothes in series 4. Irma is also often involved in charity work, and she cares deeply for the donkey sanctuary.
- Mr. Bean's Mini – Mr. Bean's personal vehicle, a citron-green Mini with a matte black bonnet. As a running gag, Bean keeps it locked with a bolt-latch and padlock rather than the lock fitted to the car (like in the original live-action sitcom). Unlike in the live-action sitcom where the Mini's registration number is "SLW 287R", the registration number in the animated series is "STE 952R".

=== Supporting ===
- Burglars – A duo of unnamed criminals (one large and the other small) who are masters of disguise and regularly go across London committing various crimes, only to nevertheless suffer defeat at the hands of Mr. Bean (mainly at times when he is their victim or witness), who then has the local police arrest them. The burglars serve as the antagonists, appearing in numerous episodes.
- Bruiser family – Mr. Bean and Mrs. Wicket's next-door neighbours, a working class overweight family who sometimes act as Bean's adversaries. The characters were unnamed in the first two series until their revelation in "Halloween". While appearing as a whole family in the episodes "Neighbourly Bean", "Scaredy Bean", "Home Movie", "Litterbugs", "Super Spy" and "Dig This", only the father and son appear for the majority of the series.
- Traffic Warden – An unnamed parking enforcement officer, who originally appeared in the live-action episode "The Trouble with Mr. Bean" and locates and tickets illegally-parked cars across London. As Mr. Bean habitually parks his Mini in the wrong places, she promptly gets in his way which puts him at odds with her. She is very committed at her duty, even to the point of ticketing a police vehicle once.
- Reliant Regal – A light-blue and three-wheeled car which, as another running gag, is always getting turned over or crashed out of its parking space or into anywhere by Mr. Bean in his Mini, who is usually oblivious to the results (like in the original live-action sitcom). However, in the episode "Car Wars", Mr. Bean finds himself in a conflict with the car in which he dedicates the episode to purposefully crashing it. Unlike in the live-action sitcom where the Reliant's registration number is "GRA 26K", the registration number in the animated series is "DUW 742".
- Police officers - A range of policemen who are often quick to arrive to crime scenes, but don't always solve the cases successfully by themselves. Hence, they are often assissted by Mr. Bean who witnesses the burglars and thieves himself.
- Billy Wicket – Billy Wicket is the jolly, often boisterous and hyperactive nephew of Mrs. Wicket. He is usually seen playing video games at his aunt's flat.
- Lottie – Irma Gobb's teddy bear who looks identical to Teddy, except she has eyelashes, a red bow and a skirt. She is portrayed as Teddy's girlfriend, but Mr. Bean disapproves of this relationship.
- Mr. Paliwal – A well-off entrepreneur and new neighbour of Mr. Bean and Mrs. Wicket introduced in series 4, living on the opposite side of the street. Unlike the Brusiers, he acts more friendly and respectful as a neighbour towards Mr. Bean, and despite their difference in personalities, they generally get on well together. He is also married.
- Mr. Paliwal's Wife- She is Mr Paliwal's unnamed wife.
- Divia - Mr Paliwal's daughter who is revealed in the episode "Irma's surprise" to be good at making ice sculptures.

== Development ==
Tiger Aspect Productions announced the series in October 2000. Valued at $15 million, the series was already pre-sold to ITV but did not have an animation studio tied into the production. The following month, it was announced that Varga would handle animation production. In February 2001, Entertainment Rights acquired all UK merchandising and licensing rights to the series

Prior to the series' UK premiere in March 2002, Fremantle International Distribution pre-sold the series in Canada, Australia, New Zealand, Singapore, Portugal, Cyprus and French-speaking Belgium, with Super RTL securing rights in Germany. Fremantle held all rights except in the US, UK, Hungary and Japan. Varga, who handled all Hungarian rights, pre-sold the series to RTL Klub and it premiered in April, a month after its UK premiere. By December, the series was pre-sold in Sweden and Finland.

In April 2003, the series made its debut in the United States through various public television stations, with A&E Home Video acquiring home media rights. Sharpe, the North American licence holder for the show, signed a deal with Toy Play to release a toyline based on the show for the US and Canadian markets in September. In December, Fremantle International continued to pre-sell the series internationally while BBC Worldwide acquired Japanese licensing and home media rights.

In February 2004, Tiger Aspect announced that they had pre-sold UK Pay-TV rights to the series to Nickelodeon UK to air on their Nicktoons TV channel for a three-year deal.

After the Nickelodeon UK deal expired, in March 2010 Tiger Aspect Productions signed a new three-year deal with Turner Broadcasting System Europe to air the series on Boomerang from July 2010 onwards. Since then, the show continues to be broadcast on the British feed of Boomerang today, and has also been broadcast on other Warner Bros. Discovery channels internationally.

== Reception ==
The show was met with mostly positive reviews from television critics. Common Sense Media, an education and advocacy group that promotes safe technology and media for children, gave the show 3 stars and wrote that the "UK slapstick cartoon [is] geared toward older kids, adults."

== Home media ==
Mr. Bean: The Animated Series has been released on DVD by A&E Home Video in Region 1, and by Universal Pictures Home Entertainment in Regions 2 and 4. In the United States, the first series of the show were released in its entirety on six volumes, while in the United Kingdom and Australia, the six volumes only contained 47 out of all the 52 episodes, with the remaining episodes instead appearing as extra features on DVDs of the original live-action sitcom and The feature film.

The reason for this was that when the five episodes were classified by the British Board of Film Classification in the United Kingdom, they were each given a PG certificate instead of a U certificate unlike the other episodes. It was then decided that all DVDs of the series should have a U certificate each, resulting in the five PG-rated episodes not being included.

In Region 4, the DVD Mr. Bean: The Animated Series: Series 2, Volume 3 – Racing Adventures was an exclusive product for Big W; nowadays, it is no longer available.

Mr. Bean: The Animated Series home video releases
Series		Episodes	Release dates		
Series		Episodes	United Kingdom	United States	Australia
1	2002	52	Volume 1: Eight Amazing Adventures: 29 August 2005; twentieth anniversary reissue: 6 September 2010; twenty-fifth anniversary reissue: 20 July 2015; Episode(s) featured: "In the Wild" – "Spring Clean" Volume 2: Eight Exciting Escapades: 27 March 2006; twentieth anniversary reissue: 6 September 2010; Episode(s) featured: "Birthday Bear" – "Homeless" Volume 4: Seven Smashing Stories: 13 November 2006; twentieth anniversary reissue: 6 September 2010; Episode(s) featured: "Nurse!" – "The Bottle" The Bean Boxset!: 18 March 2008; twentieth anniversary reissue: 6 September 2010 Cat-Sitting and More Paw-some Adventures!: 29 August 2016; Episode(s) featured: "Birthday Bear" • "The Mole" • "Dead Cat" • "Magpie" • "Cat-Sitting" Egg and Bean and Other Springtime Surprises: 3 April 2017; Episode(s) featured: "Spring Clean"	Volume 1: Bean There, Done That: 30 September 2003; Episode(s) featured: "Nurse!" – "The Bottle" Volume 4: Grin and Bean It: 28 September 2004; Episode(s) featured: "No Parking" • "Bean's Bounty" Volume 6: It's Not Easy Being Bean: 28 September 2004; Episode(s) featured: "In the Wild" • "Missing Teddy" • "Mime Games" – "Homeless"	Volume 1: Eight Amazing Adventures: 18 August 2004; Episode(s) featured: "In the Wild" – "Spring Clean" Volume 2: Eight Exciting Escapades: 4 July 2007; Episode(s) featured: "Birthday Bear" – "Homeless" Volume 4: Seven Smashing Stories: 28 October 2009; Episode(s) featured: "Nurse!" – "The Bottle" Volume 3: Eight Terrific Tales: 31 July 2006; twentieth anniversary reissue: 6 September 2010; Episode(s) featured: "Royal Bean" – "Toothache" Volume 4: Seven Smashing Stories: 13 November 2006; twentieth anniversary reissue: 6 September 2010; Episode(s) featured: "Neighbourly Bean" Volume 5: Eight Eventful Escapades: 19 March 2007; twentieth anniversary reissue: 9 September 2010; Episode(s) featured: "Inventor" • "Car Trouble" • "Restaurant" • "Wanted" The Bean Boxset!: 18 March 2008; twentieth anniversary reissue: 6 September 2010 Cat-Sitting and More Paw-some Adventures!: 29 August 2016; Episode(s) featured: "In the Pink" On Thin Ice and Other Winter Wonders: 2 October 2017; Episode(s) featured: "Young Bean" • "Dinner for Two" || Volume 1: Bean There, Done That: 30 September 2003; Episode(s) featured: "Goldfish" • "Inventor" Volume 2: Whatever Will Bean, Will Bean: 30 March 2004; Episode(s) featured: "Royal Bean" – "Restaurant" Volume 3: It's All Bean to Me: 30 March 2004; Episode(s) featured: "Art Thief" – "Wanted" || Volume 3: Eight Terrific Tales: 28 October 2009; Episode(s) featured: "Royal Bean" – "Toothache" Volume 4: Seven Smashing Stories: 28 October 2009; Episode(s) featured: "Neighbourly Bean" Volume 5: Eight Eventful Escapades: 28 October 2009; Episode(s) featured: "Inventor" • "Car Trouble" • "Restaurant" • "Wanted" Volume 1: Eight Amazing Adventures: 29 August 2005; twentieth anniversary reissue: 6 September 2010; twenty-fifth anniversary reissue: 20 July 2015; Episode(s) featured: "Artful Bean" • "The Fly" Volume 2: Eight Exciting Escapades: 27 March 2006; twentieth anniversary reissue: 6 September 2010; Episode(s) featured: "No Pets" • "Ray of Sunshine" Volume 3: Eight Terrific Tales: 31 July 2006; twentieth anniversary reissue: 6 September 2010; Episode(s) featured: "Camping" • "Chocks Away" Volume 5: Eight Eventful Escapades: 19 March 2007; twentieth anniversary reissue: 9 September 2010; Episode(s) featured: "Gadget Kid" – "Keyboard Capers" Volume 6: Eight Sticky Scrapes: 22 November 2007; twentieth anniversary reissue: 9 September 2010; Episode(s) featured: "A Royal Makeover" – "Egg and Bean" • "Hopping Mad!" • "A Grand Invitation" • "Bean in Love" • "Double Trouble" The Bean Boxset!: 18 March 2008; twentieth anniversary reissue: 6 September 2010 Cat-Sitting and More Paw-some Adventures!: 29 August 2016; Episode(s) featured: "The Fly" • "Hopping Mad!" • "No Pets" Egg and Bean and Other Springtime Surprises: 3 April 2017; Episode(s) featured: "Egg and Bean" • "Hopping Mad!" • "Ray of Sunshine" || Volume 3: It's All Bean to Me: 30 March 2004; Episode(s) featured: "Gadget Kid" – "Keyboard Capers" Volume 4: Grin and Bean It: 28 September 2004; Episode(s) featured: "Artful Bean" – "Egg and Bean" Volume 5: The Ends Justify the Beans: 28 September 2004; Episode(s) featured: "Camping" – "Double Trouble" || Volume 1: Eight Amazing Adventures: 18 August 2004; Episode(s) featured: "Artful Bean" • "The Fly" Volume 2: Eight Exciting Escapades: 4 July 2007; Episode(s) featured: "No Pets" • "Ray of Sunshine" Volume 3: Eight Terrific Tales: 28 October 2009; Episode(s) featured: "Camping" • "Chocks Away" Volume 5: Eight Eventful Escapades: 28 October 2009; Episode(s) featured: "Gadget Kid" – "Keyboard Capers" Volume 6: Eight Sticky Scrapes: 28 October 2009; Episode(s) featured: "A Royal Makeover" – "Egg and Bean" • "Hopping Mad!" • "A Grand Invitation" • "Bean in Love" • "Double Trouble"
2	2015–16	52	Volume 7: Nine Tremendous Tales (Original release) / Home Movie and More Tremendous Tales! (2017 New Cover Re release): 7 September 2015; Episode(s) featured: "Home Movie" – "Valentine's Bean" Volume 8: Nine Splendid Stories (Original release) / Holiday For Teddy and More Tantalising Tales! (2017 New Cover Re release): 19 October 2015; Episode(s) featured: "All You Can Eat" – "Lord Bean" Volume 9: Racing Adventures and More Exciting Escapades!: 23 May 2016; Episode(s) featured: "Car Wars" – "Taxi Bean" Volume 10: Halloween and More Awesome Stories!: 3 October 2016; Episode(s) featured: "Muscle Bean" – "Halloween" Volume 11: SuperBean and Other Splendid Stories!: 30 January 2017; Episode(s) featured: "Wrestle Bean" – "Ice Cream" Egg and Bean and Other Springtime Surprises: 3 April 2017; Episode(s) featured: "Holiday for Teddy" • "Scout Bean" • "A New Friend" • "Ice Cream" Volume 12: Birthday Bean and Friends: 24 July 2017; Episode(s) featured: "Bean Painting" • "Birthday Party" – "Bean Shopping" On Thin Ice and Other Winter Wonders: 2 October 2017; Episode(s) featured: "Green Bean" • "Rat Trap" • "Viral Bean" • "Lord Bean" • "Jurassic Bean"	—N/a	Volume 7: Nine Tremendous Tales: 24 September 2015; Episode(s) featured: "Home Movie" – "Valentine's Bean" Volume 8: Nine Splendid Stories: 24 September 2015; Episode(s) featured: "All You Can Eat" – "Lord Bean" Volume 9: Racing Adventures and More Exciting Escapades!: 16 June 2016; Episode(s) featured: "Car Wars" – "Taxi Bean" Volume 10: Halloween and More Awesome Stories!: 2017; Episode(s) featured: "Muscle Bean" – "Halloween" Volume 11: SuperBean and Other Splendid Stories!: 2017; Episode(s) featured: "Wrestle Bean" – "Ice Cream"

== In other media ==
A third-person platform video game based on the series was released in the late 2000s on multiple platforms. It was first released in PAL regions as Mr. Bean on the PlayStation 2, Nintendo DS, and Microsoft Windows. A Wii port of the game, titled Mr. Bean's Wacky World, was also released shortly after those versions in the same regions, with a North American localisation of the port being available in 2011.

Multiple mobile games based on the series have been released such as Mr. Bean: Around the World, Mr. Bean: Flying Teddy, Mr. Bean: Sandwich Stack, Mr. Bean: Special Delivery and more which are available globally on iOS, Android, and Amazon mobile devices.
