= Marsupilami (2000 TV series) =

Animated television series

- Season 1 main title
- Also known as: My Friend Marsupilami (season 2); Marsupilami: Hoobah Hoobah Hop! (seasons 3–4); Our Neighbours the Marsupilamis (season 5)
- Created by: André Franquin
- Based on: Marsupilami by André Franquin
- Developed by: Samuel Kaminka (season 1); Éric-Paul Marais (season 1); Olivier Vannelle (season 2); Vincent Chalvon-Demersay (season 2); David Michel (season 2); Cyril Tysz (seasons 3–5); Guillaume Enard (seasons 3–4)
- Directed by: Augusto Zanovello (season 1); Pierre Hounde (season 1); François Brisson (season 1); Daniel Duda (season 2); Claude Allix (seasons 3–4); Moran Caouissin (seasons 3–4); Pascal Ropars (season 5)
- Composers: Jean-Michel Bernard (season 1); Olivier Aussudre (season 1); Norbert Gilbert (season 2); Giovanni Luisi (season 2); Laurent Hoogstoël (seasons 3–5); Olivier Bayol (seasons 3–5)
- Countries of origin: France; Belgium; Canada (season 1); South Korea (season 1); Germany (seasons 3–5)
- Original language: French
- No. of seasons: 5
- No. of episodes: 130

Production
- Executive producers: Olivier Bremond (season 1); Pascal Breton (season 1); Vincent Chalvon-Demersay (season 1); André A. Bélanger (season 1); Nelson Shin (season 1); Samuel Kaminka (seasons 3–5)
- Producers: Vincent Chalvon-Demersay (season 2); David Michel (season 2)
- Running time: 22 minutes
- Production companies: Marsu Productions; Marathon Animation (seasons 1–2); Motion International (season 1); Koaa Film (season 1); Samka Productions (seasons 3–5); France Télévisions (seasons 3–5); ZDF Enterprises (seasons 3–5); Lagardère Thématiques (season 5); Sofica Hoche Artois Images (season 5)

Original release
- Network: France 3 (seasons 1–2); Canal J (seasons 1–2, 5); Disney Channel France (seasons 3–4)
- Release: March 18, 2000 – 2013

The Marsupilamis 117 is an animated series based on the original Marsupilami comics created by André Franquin. It was produced by Marsu Productions in association with Marathon Animation (known as Marathon Productions in season 1) for seasons 1–2 and later Samka Productions for seasons 3–5. Its first season was simply known as Marsupilami, however the series has been renamed multiple times throughout its run.

== Season 1 (2000) ==
The first season of Marsupilami premiered on March 18, 2000, on Canal J. Produced by Cactus Animation, Marathon Production and Marsu Productions. Marathon's series is far more faithful to the original Marsupilami comic series than the previous Marsupilami animated works made by Disney (featured in the 1992 series Disney's Raw Toonage and its spin-off), which is no longer in circulation because Disney lost the rights to the character at some point in 1999.

In this first season, Marsupilami went on adventures alone or with his family (his wife Marsupilamie and their three young, They are a 4-year-old Bibi, Bibu and Bobo). For example, in one episode he saved a group of circus animals, got them back to the city and saved the circus from closing. In another, he had to go to the city again to save one of his young, captured by their constant enemy, the hunter Bring M. Backalive.

== Season 2 - My Friend Marsupilami (2003) ==
In the second season, features a (born: August 19, 1997) 11-year-old boy named Leo Newman, his younger sister named Zoe Newman and their parents named David Newman and Amanda Newman. Marsupilami and his family become best friends with a human family, the Newmans, that comes to live near them. Amanda is a Marsupilami researcher, while her husband David is a computer technician that works from home and they have two children, Leo and Zoe. Leo and Marsupilami become best friends and they have lots of adventures, with both new friends and old enemies, like Backalive.

== Seasons 3-4 - Marsupilami Hoobah Hoobah Hop! (2009-2010) ==
The third two seasons features a 15-year-old boy named Hector Forster and his aunt Diane Forster. who are going to live in the jungle for one year to study its fauna and flora. They become the best friends with the Marsupilami family. Their main enemies are megalomaniac industrialist and jungle-hater Felicia Devort, who plans to level out the Palombian jungle and build the Devort City megalopolis in its place, and her two henchmen, Stroy and Blouprint.

== Season 5 - Our Neighbors the Marsupilamis (2012) ==
The fifth and final season, featured the Marsupilami family living with veterinarian Bernard Vanderstadt and his four children Sarah, Iris, Isidore and Zoe. Their mother, Caroline, frequently contacts them by phone. While there are 24 episodes in total, she only appears in only at least three episodes. Once again, Backalive makes an appearance.
