= The Intrepids =

- Written by: Eric Rognard; Eric Summer
- Directed by: Gilberto Azevedo; Bernard Dubois; Olivier Langlois; Laurent Lévy; Jacques Payette; Johanne Prégent
- Starring: Jessica Barker; Lorànt Deutsch; Danielle Proulx; Luc Gentil; Tchee; Vincent Bolduc
- Country of origin: Canada; France
- No. of seasons: 2
- No. of episodes: 52

Production
- Executive producers: Micheline Charest; Ronald A. Weinberg; Pascal Breton
- Producers: Louise Gendron; Micheline Charest
- Running time: 30 minutes
- Production companies: CINAR Films; Marathon Productions

Original release
- Release: March 12, 1993 – 1996

The Intrepids (French Les Intrépides) is a TV series for children, released between 1993 and 1996, that ran for 52 episodes (about 30 minutes each).

The series is about adventures of two kids; Julie Boileau and Tom Miller, whose parents got married and that made them step-siblings. Tom and Julie run their own radio station for kids and help its listeners to resolve their - often criminal - adventures and problems.

== Cast ==
- Jessica Barker as Julie Boileau
- Lorànt Deutsch as Tom Miller
- Danielle Proulx as Claire Boileau (Julie's mother)
- Luc Gentil as Robert Miller (Tom's father)
- Tchee as Trahn
- Vincent Bolduc as Antoine

== Crew ==
- Writers: Eric Rognard, Eric Summer
- Directors: Gilberto Azevedo, Bernard Dubois, Olivier Langlois, Laurent Lévy, Jacques Payette, Johanne Prégent
