= Funny Little Animals =

French book series

- Author: Antoon Krings
- Country: France
- Language: French
- Genre: Children's literature
- Publisher: Gallimard Jeunesse
- Published: 1994–present
- Media type: Print; Audiobook; E-book
- No. of books: 71 (main series)

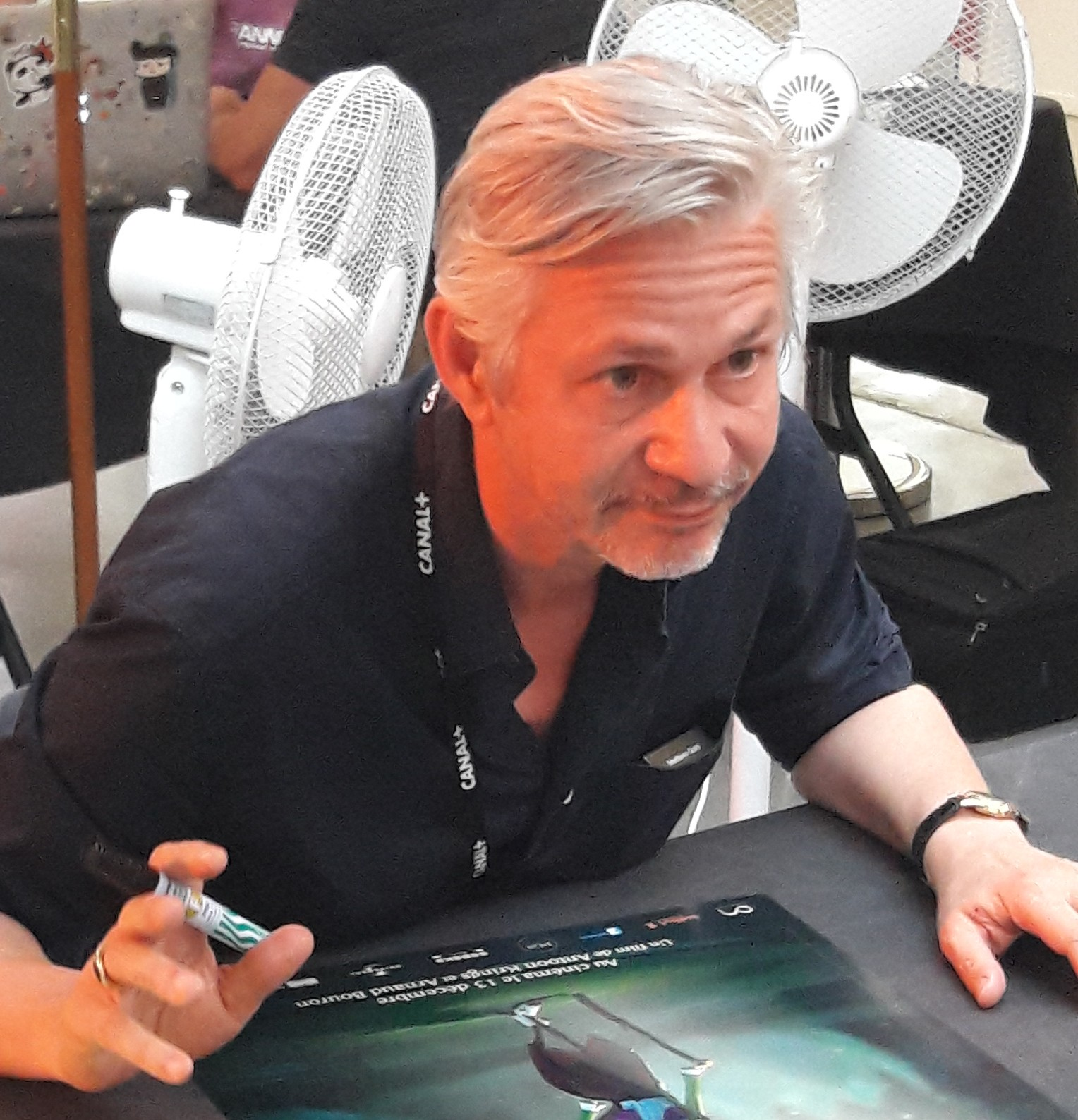
Krings, author of Funny Little Animals

Funny Little Animals (French: Drôles de petites bêtes) is a series of children's books written by French illustrator and writer Antoon Krings and published by Gallimard Jeunesse. Taking place in a shared universe, each book centres around a different anthropomorphic insect or small mammal, with some reoccurring characters appearing in different books. Krings gives each character a distinct personality that matches what insect or animal they are, often giving them a name that rhymes with the animal that they are. As of 2019, the Funny Little Animals series has sold more than 19 million copies with translations in over twenty languages. The series has been adapted into multiple mediums, including a feature film in 2017 and a television series in 2019.

== Books ==
List of books released in the main series of Funny Little Animals, ordered by release date:

1. Mireille the Bee (Mireille l'abeille; 1994)
2. Belle the Ladybug (Belle la coccinelle; 1994)
3. Simeon the Butterfly (Siméon le papillon; 1994)
4. Chloé the Spider (Chloé l'araignée; 1994)
5. Camille the Caterpillar (Camille la chenille; 1994)
6. Marie the Ant (Marie la fourmi; 1994)
7. Leon the Bumblebee (Léon le bourdon; 1995)
8. Margot the Snail (Margot l'escargot; 1995)
9. Barnabé the Beetle (Barnabé le scarabée; 1995)
10. Patouch the Fly (Patouch la mouche; 1995)
11. Carole the Firefly (Carole la luciole; 1995)
12. Ursula the Dragonfly (Ursule la libellule; 1995)
13. Loulou the Louse (Loulou le pou; 1995)
14. Fredric the Mosquito (Frédéric le moustique; 1996)
15. Benjamin the Lutin (Benjamin le lutin; 1996)
16. Adele the Grasshopper (Adèle la sauterelle; 1996)
17. Oscar the Cockroach (Oscar le cafard; 1996)
18. Luce the Flea (Luce la puce; 1996)
19. Pat the Centipede (Pat le mille-pattes; 1997)
20. Pascale the Cicada (Pascale la cigale; 1997)
21. Huguette the Wasp (Huguette la guêpe; 1997)
22. Hugo the Maggot (Hugo l'asticot; 1998)
23. Adrien the Rabbit (Adrien le lapin; 1998)
24. Grace the Slug (Grâce la limace; 1998)
25. Caesar the Lizard (César le lézard; 1998)
26. Lolu the Turtle (Lolu la tortue; 1999)
27. Solange the Tit (Solange la mésange; 1999)
28. Georges the Robin (Georges le rouge-gorge; 1999)
29. Lorette the Daisy (Lorette la pâquerette; 1999)
30. Maud the Mole (Maud la taupe; 2000)
31. Antonin the Chick (Antonin le poussin; 2000)
32. Amélie the Mouse (Amélie la souris; 2001)
33. Juliette the Tree Frog (Juliette la rainette; 2001)
34. Samson the Hedgehog (Samson le hérisson; 2002)
35. Valerie the Bat (Valérie la chauve-souris; 2002)
36. Benjamin the Garden Santa (Benjamin le Père Noël du jardin; 2002)
37. Pierrot the Sparrow (Pierrot le moineau; 2003)
38. Zabeth the Owl (Zabeth la chouette; 2003)
39. Leon the Bee King (Léon le roi des abeilles; 2004)
40. Odilon the Cricket (Odilon le grillon; 2004)
41. Lune the Little Bear (Luna la petite ourse; 2005)
42. Blaise and Thérèse the Bugs (Blaise et Thérèse les punaises; 2006)
43. Leonard the Tadpole (Léonard le têtard; 2006)
44. Edward the Dormouse (Édouard le loir; 2008)
45. Marion and Simon the Kittens (Marion et Simon les chatons; 2008)
46. Victor the Beaver (Victor le castor; 2009)
47. Merlin the Blackbird (Merlin le merle; 2010)
48. Romain the Rabbit Magician (Romain le lapin magicien; 2010)
49. Prosper the Hamster (Prosper le hamster; 2010)
50. Louis the Moth (Louis le papillon de nuit; 2011)
51. Noémie the Princess Ant (Noémie princesse fourmi; 2011)
52. Theo the Mouse (Théo le mulot; 2012)
53. Gaston the Duckling (Gaston le caneton; 2012)
54. Romeo the Toad (Roméo le Crapaud; 2013)
55. Gabriel the Christmas Elf (Gabriel le Lutin de Noël; 2013)
56. Henry the Canary (Henri le canari; 2014)
57. Bob the Snowman (Bob le Bonhomme de neige; 2014)
58. Robin the Garden Squirrel (Robin l'écureuil du jardin; 2015)
59. Cyprian the Dog (Cyprien le Chien; 2015)
60. Leo the Leopard (Léo le Lérot; 2016)
61. Nora, the little opera rat (Nora petit rat de l'opéra; 2016)
62. Apollo the Cricket (Apollon le grillon; 2017)
63. Marguerite the Little Queen (Marguerite petite reine; 2017)
64. Violette the Discreet (Violette la discrète; 2018)
65. Capucine the rascal (Capucine la coquine; 2018)
66. Sleep, Buttercup (Dors, Bouton d’or; 2019)
67. Rose, Little Rose (Rose, petite rose; 2020)
68. Snowdrop, Little Snow Queen (Perce-Neige, petite reine des neiges; 2020)
69. Ariel, Little Rainbow (Ariel, petit arc-en-ciel; 2021)
70. Simon, Little Bumblebee (Simon, petit bourdon; 2021)
71. Little Eglantine (Petite Églantine; 2022)

== Adaptations ==
In 2001, it was adapted into an animated series titled Funny Little Bugs. In 2005, a direct-to-video film was released, entitled Funny Little Bugs: The Four Seasons (French: Drôles de petites bêtes: Les Quatre Saisons). A theatrical film followed in 2017, Tall Tales from the Magical Garden of Antoon Krings—released as simply Drôles de petites bêtes in France—which was produced by Onyx Films and Bidibul Productions. It was directed by Krings alongside Arnaud Delalande, with its soundtrack composed by Bruno Coulais. At the international box office, Tall Tales grossed $14.3 million. A 52-episode television series inspired by the film, Apollo's Tall Tales (French: Apollon le grillon et les drôles de petites bêtes), aired on France 5 from 6 April 2019. Each episode has a runtime of 13 minutes.
