= Kassai and Luk =

Children's television series

- Also known as: Kassai and Leuk
- Created by: Olivier Massart
- Based on: La Belle Histoire de Leuk-le-Lièvre by: Leopold Senghor; Abdoulaye Sadji
- Written by: Olivier Massart; Stéphane Cabel; Olivier Nicolas
- Directed by: Jean-Louis Bompoint
- Theme music composer: Ismaël Lô
- Composer: Jean-Michel Bernard
- Countries of origin: France; Canada; South Korea
- Original languages: French; English
- No. of episodes: 26

Production
- Executive producers: Pascal Breton; Oliviér Bremond; Olivier Massart
- Running time: 22 minutes
- Production companies: Lacewood Productions; Marathon Productions; Les Films De L'Horizon; Hahn Shin

Original release
- Network: France 2 (France); Canal J (France); Teletoon (Canada)
- Release: April 30, 1997 – 1997

Kassai and Luk (also called Kassai & Luk, Kassai and Leuk or Samba et Leuk on Télétoon, also stylized Samba & Leuk) is a children's animated television series produced by Marathon Productions. It was developed in 1996 and originally aired in English in 1997 on Teletoon, which classified it as a pre-school program. In Mexico, it was aired by Once Niños. Directed by Jean-Louis Bompoint and inspired in La Belle Histoire de Leuk-le-Lièvre written by Abdoulaye Sadji and Léopold Sédar Senghor in 1953.

There are 26 episodes.

== Premise ==
This short-lived animation series was based on African stories. The three protagonists are the young man Kassai, his sidekick Leuk, a talking humanoid hare who knows the jungle well, and Princess Marana, who is cursed to transform into a gazelle during the day. In the series, Kassai goes on various quests to find the scattered parts of his tribe's patron goddess, Koorie, and tries to stop the plans of the evil god Toguum, who can possess people to do his bidding. The opening theme "Samba Et Leuk" is performed by the African musician Ismaël Lô.

== Characters ==
- Kassai, a boy
- Leuk (aka Luk), a hare.
- Marana, a girl who is cursed to become a gazelle by day, and return a girl at night
- Maliba
- Nommos
- Ogotem
- Togum (aka Togoum) voiced by John Stocker
