= Jessica Barker =

Canadian actress

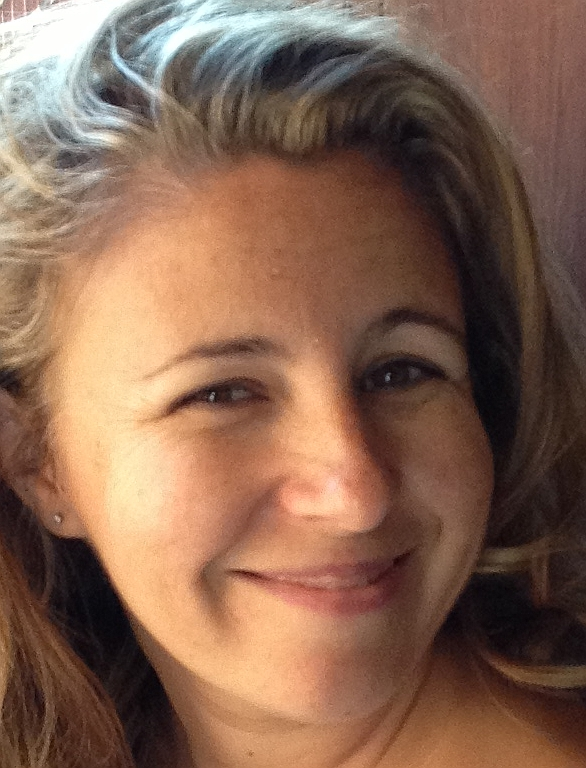
Jessica Barker

Jessica Barker (born October 12, 1977) is a Canadian actress. She got interested in acting at the age of 7 and won her first role 3 years later. The biggest turning point in Barker's career came in 1993, when she won a main role in the new TV-series for children The Intrepids, where, with her co-star Lorànt Deutsch, she ran a radio station and played investigator. The show was a big success and ran for three years. During this period, Barker did a couple of other projects but stopped everything in 1999 to attend university; she returned in 2004 in the movie Le Golem de Montréal.
