= Banijay Kids & Family =

French television production company

- Logo used since 2021
- Formerly: Zodiak Kids (2011–2021)
- Type: Subsidiary
- Industry: Television production
- Predecessor: Tele Images Productions
- Founded: 14 February 2011; 15 years ago
- Headquarters: London, England
- Area served: Worldwide
- Key people: Benoît Di Sabatino (CEO); Ludovic Taron (Chief Operating Officer); Delphine Dumont (Chief Commercial Officer, Distribution); Jeremie Becamel (CFO)
- Parent: Zodiak Media (2011–2016); Banijay Entertainment (2016–2026; 2026–present)
- Divisions: Banijay Kids & Family Digital; Banijay Kids & Family Distribution; Kindle Entertainment; Monello Productions; Movimenti Production; Procidis; Tiger Aspect Kids & Family; Zodiak Kids & Family France; Zodiak Kids & Family Productions UK
- Website: www.banijaykidsandfamily.com

Banijay Kids & Family (formerly known as Zodiak Kids, Zodiak Kids Studios and Zodiak Kids & Family) is a television production company owned by Banijay Entertainment based in London with offices in Neuilly-sur-Seine. The company was originally founded in February 2011 by Zodiak Media combining its previous children's production companies into one. Benoît Di Sabatino is the current CEO.

== Background ==
Before the formation of Zodiak Kids in 2011, Marathon Media announced in 2005 that it would merge with the French division of the British-based private firm Bridgepoint Capital (owners of French TV production group Tele Images). Tele Images' subsidiaries, GTV Productions and Adventure Line Productions, would be part of the new group, while Vincent Chalvon-Demersay and David Michel continued to hold their stakes in Marathon's animation division. The following year, in January 2006, the merger was completed, forming the largest production and distribution group based in France, and the combined entity was subsequently named Marathon Group.

In July 2007, it was announced that the Italian-based holding company, De Agostini, had acquired Marathon Group from Bridgepoint Capital, turning De Agostini from a multimedia company into a European content production company while it entered the animation production business with Marathon Media and Tele Images became De Agostini's in-house animation production studio.

In February 2008, Marathon Group brought a majority stake in independent entertainment & documentary production company KM Production, the acquisition of KM Productions had resulted in reuniting the acquired documentary studio KM Production with Marathon Group's subsidiary Adventure Line Productions (which had been part of Canal+-owned StudioExpand until 2004) as Marathon Group folded KM's operations into the group, while KM Production's founder, Renaud Le Van Kim, continued to operate the company.

Three months later in May of that year, Marathon Group's owner, De Agostini, announced that they had made a deal to acquire the Swedish-based Scandinavian production & distribution outfit Zodiak Television AB. The acquisition was completed in November of the same year as the acquired Swedish production & distribution studio Zodial Television AB gained entry into the kids & family production industry, with that Zodiak Television AB had been rebranded as Zodiak Entertainment while De Agostini's animation production studios Marathon Media and Tele Images had been transferred and became subsidiaries of the rebranded company as the latter's own in-house animation production studios.

== History ==
In February 2011, Zodiak Media Group announced the establishment of a children's television division named Zodiak Kids. The French animation production companies (Marathon Media and Tele Images Productions), the British production company (The Foundation TV Productions), and Zodiak Active's kids entertainment division were placed into the new division alongside Zodiak Rights's kids & family distribution activities.

In late-November 2014, Zodiak Kids and their subsidiary, Tele Images Productions, had announced that the latter's founder and president, and CEO of Marathon Images, Philippe Alessandri, was stepping down as its president.

In late-April 2015, Zodiak Kids expanded their online presence by launching two multi-platform YouTube channels which were called ZeeKay and ZeeKay Junior. The two channels would work closely with Zodiak Kids' new production division, Zodiak Kids Studios, alongside third party producers to launch original content on the two channels.

In February 2016, Zodiak Kids and its Swedish/French production & distribution parent Zodiak Media merged with the rival French independent international television production and distribution company, Banijay Group, with the former being folded into Banijay Group as Zodiak Kids became Banijay's new children's television production subsidiary as the latter groul had gained entry into the kids & family production operations & the animation production industry. Marathon was folded within the process. The Zodiak Kids name was retained until 2022 when the company adopted the Banijay name.

In September 2018, Zodiak Kids announced that they had hired former MoonScoop Group co-founder and co-chairman, Benoît Di Sabatino, as their new CEO of the company, succeeding Jean-Philippe Randisi.

In April 2021, Banijay announced that they had acquired the Paris-based animation studio, Monello Productions, which was founded in 2013 by former Tele Images SVP Giorgio Welter from ITV Studios-owned Tetra Media Group. The acquired animation studio was placed under Zodiak Kids and would continue to operate independently, with their founder continuing to serve as the company's president.

In November 2021, Banijay announced that they were bringing their three children's production companies, Zodiak Kids & Family, Tiger Aspect Kids & Family, and Monello Productions, into one group by launching a new division named Banijay Kids and Family with the two latter production labels Tiger Aspect Kids & Family and animation studio Monello Productions became subsidiaries of the new children's division.

In September 2022, Banijay Kids & Family announced that they had acquired two children's production companies: the London-based British live-action production & entertainment studio, Kindle Entertainment, and the Italian animation studio MoviMenti Production, with the latter being acquired from its previous parent company ForFun Media as Banijay Kids & Family had entered the Italian animation production with MoviMenti became its in-house Italian animation production studio & became an Italian subsidiary as it would handle animation services for Banijay Kids & Family's future animated series.

In January 2024, Zodiak Kids & Family Distribution was renamed as Banijay Kids & Family Distribution.

In September 2024, Banijay Entertainment acquired a majority stake in the French animation studio Procidis, placing it under the Banijay Kids & Family unit, with Benoît Di Sabatino becoming the new president and Hélène Barillé remaining the managing director.

== Divisions ==
=== Current ===
==== Banijay Kids & Family Distribution ====
Banijay Kids & Family Distribution (formerly Zodiak Kids & Family Distribution) is the distribution arm of Banijay Kids & Family, led by Delphine Dumont as chief commercial officer.

==== Kindle Entertainment ====
Kindle Entertainment is a British television production company founded in 2007 by Anne Brogan and Melanie Strokes, and is led by Strokes as managing director and Emma Stuart as creative director.

==== Monello Productions ====
Monello Productions is a French animation studio founded in September 2013 by Giorgio Welter and Cécile Sady, who lead the company as president and CCO respectively.

==== Movimenti Production ====
Movimenti Production is an Italian animation studio founded in 2004 by Giorgio Scorza, Davide Rosio and Roberto Cipriani, with Scorza and Rosio leading the company as co-CEOs and Creative Directors.

==== Procidis ====
Procidis is a French animation studio founded in 1962 by Albert Barillé and led by Banijay Kids & Family CEO, Benoît Di Sabatino as president, and Hélène Barillé as managing director.

==== Tiger Aspect Kids & Family ====
Tiger Aspect Kids & Family is a British television production company founded in 2002 as the animation division of Tiger Aspect. It is currently led by Tom Beattie as managing director.

Both Tiger Aspect's animation division and Tiger Aspect were later bought by IMG Media Group, the British television production division of sports media powerhouse by 1 June 2006, before selling them to the Dutch media entertainment production & distribution company, Endemol, through its UK division.

==== Zodiak Kids & Family France ====
Zodiak Kids & Family France (formerly Marathon Productions, Marathon Animation, Marathon Media and Zodiak Kids Studio France) is a French animation studio founded in 1990 by Pascal Breton and Olivier Bremond. Vincent Chalvon-Demersay joined the team in 1999 to develop Marathon's animation programming, along with David Michel. It is currently led by Benoît Di Sabatino as CEO.

In February 2014, Marathon Media announced that its co-founder and general manager David Michel was stepping down.

==== Zodiak Kids & Family Productions UK ====
Zodiak Kids & Family Productions UK (formerly The Foundation and Zodiak Kids Studio UK) is a British television production company founded in 1994. It is led by Gwen Hughes as CEO.

In August 2006, The Foundation was acquired by the British independent production and distribution company, RDF Media Group, in order for RDF to further expand their kids and family entertainment operation. The Foundation's founders Vanessa Hill and Ged Allen had continued to work in The Foundation under RDF, alongside RDF's family entertainment director Nigel Pickard, who had joined the acquired company.

=== Former ===
==== Tele Images Productions ====
Tele Images Productions was established in 1985 by Simone Harari as a producer of children's television programs in animation and live-action. Philippe Alessandri joined the company in 1998 to spearhead animation production. In 2006, it merged with Marathon Media to form the Marathon Group, which was later acquired by Zodiak Media in 2008. It was moved under the Zodiak Kids division in 2011 and was folded in 2016.

==== Zodiak Active ====
Zodiak Active was a division of Zodiak Kids established in 2010 by the integration of two of Zodiak Media's existing companies Neo Network and RDF Contact to produce digital and branded programming.
