= Tall Tales from the Magical Garden of Antoon Krings =

2017 French animated film

- French theatrical release poster
- French: Drôles de petites bêtes
- Directed by: Antoon Krings; Arnaud Delalande
- Screenplay by: Antoon Krings; Arnaud Delalande; Christel Gonnard
- Edited by: Nazim Meslem
- Music by: Bruno Coulais
- Production companies: Onyx Films; Bidibul Productions
- Distributed by: Gebeka Films
- Release date: 13 December 2017
- Running time: 87 minutes
- Countries: France; Luxembourg
- Language: French
- Budget: $22 million
- Box office: $14 million

Tall Tales from the Magical Garden of Antoon Krings (French: Drôles de petites bêtes, lit. 'Funny little animals'), also released as simply Tall Tales, is a 2017 French-language 3D animated adventure film written and directed by Antoon Krings and Arnaud Delalande and written by Christel Gonnard, based on the Funny Little Animals series of children's books by Kring. An international co-production between France and Luxembourg, Tall Tales from the Magical Garden of Antoon Krings was produced by Onyx Films and Bidibul Productions. It was released in France on 13 December 2017.

== Premise ==
Apollo the Cricket, a traveling performer, arrives at the village of the Little Bugs and falls into a trap set by Queen Marguerite's cousin, Huguette, who plans on seizing the throne. Caught in the commotion, Apollo ends up being erroneously accused of kidnapping the Queen. In order to prove his innocence, he sets out on a journey to save Queen Marguerite.

== Voice cast ==
- Emmanuel Curtil as Apollo the cricket
- Kev Adams as Loulou the louse
- Virginie Efira as Huguette the wasp
- Anne Tilloy as Queen Marguerite
- Céline Melloul as Mireille the bee
- Jean-Philippe Janssens as Simeon the butterfly
- Vincent Ropion as Louie
- Jérémie Covillault as Sphinx
- Marie-Charlotte Leclaire as Patouch the fly
- Didier Gustin as Incognito
- Arnaud Léonard as General Krypton
- Alexandre Nguyen as Léon le bourdon
- Pierre-Alain de Garrigues as Père Pétard

== Production ==
According to director Antoon Krings, the film took five years to make, from scriptwriting to its release. The soundtrack was composed by Bruno Coulais.

== Release ==
Tall Tales from the Magical Garden of Antoon Krings was released in French cinemas on 13 December 2017 by Gebeka Films. It had an opening gross of $352,418, for a total gross of $1,738,356. The highest-grossing country was China; released on 13 April 2019 by Huaxia Film Distribution, Tall Tales from the Magical Garden of Antoon Krings opened with $985,873 for a total gross of $11,422,395. Elsewhere, it grossed $1,179,975, contributing to its worldwide box office gross of $14,340,726.
