= The Mozart Band =

Animated television series

- Spanish: La banda de Mozart
- Created by: Claudio Biern Boyd
- Countries of origin: Spain; France
- Original language: Spanish
- No. of episodes: 26

Production
- Running time: 30 minutes
- Production companies: Marathon Productions; BRB Internacional

Original release
- Network: TVE2
- Release: 6 October 1995

The Mozart Band (original Spanish title, La banda de Mozart) is a 1995 animated television series produced by BRB Internacional, Televisión Española and Marathon Productions with animation production by Wang Film Productions and Shanghai Morning Sun Animation.

It centered on the life of four members of a boy band, each named or nicknamed after a famous classical music composer, as they lived a modern adventure in each episode more or less equivalent of the moment in the real composer's life that motivated him to write one of his works.

== Characters ==
- Mozart, the leader of the band, coiner of the interjection "Shumblah!", and the only one to wear a pony tail due to the length of his red hair. The character is named after Wolfgang Amadeus Mozart.
- Beethoven, the fattest boy of the lot who always has a drumstick either behind his ear (held like a pencil) or sticking out of his pocket. He has long black hair. The character is named after Ludwig van Beethoven.
- Chopin, the keyboard player for the band, can be recognized by a strand of his brown hair that would always get into his face, but never bothered him. The character is named after Frédéric Chopin.
- Verdi, of Italian descent who lived with his family above a restaurant they own. The restaurant is called "La Traviata" after the opera of the same name. His hair appears to be black shaped into points that stick out using styling gel. The character is named after Giuseppe Verdi.

The band had a small dog named Pimples (Mozart's dog) and three girls who admired them. Their old-aged music teacher, Professor Solfa also made prominent appearances.

Blackie, the antagonist, was the son of the president of Col Records (Col being the Spanish for Cabbage, and thereby the logo of the company). His hair style resembled an eighth note on its side.

== Episodes ==
1. "Making Friends"
2. "The Lullaby"
3. "For Elisa"
4. "Aida"
5. "Pimples' Waltz"
6. "Beethoven's Let Down"
7. "The Chopin Blues"
8. "Goodbye Professor Solfa"
9. "Happy Birthday, Mr. Col"
10. "The Traviata"
11. "Our Trees"
12. "Drake the Magician"
13. "Little Night Music"
14. "The House of the Inventions"
15. "Pimples Kidnapping"
16. "La Traviata in Peril"
17. "Musical Graffiiti"
18. "The Jester Pizza"
19. "A Magical Show"
20. "Street Melody"
21. "Four Little Angels"
22. "Waltz for a Champion"
23. "Blackie Loses His Head"
24. "The Hidden Girl"
25. "All Butlers are Called James"
26. "Delirious Opera"
