= Method Animation =

French animation studio

- Formerly: Method Films (1998–2009)
- Type: Subsidiary
- Industry: Animation
- Founded: September 1997; 29 years ago
- Founder: Aton Soumache
- Headquarters: Paris, France
- Key people: Katell France (managing director)
- Parent: Mediawan Kids & Family (2014–present)
- Divisions: Methonyx
- Subsidiaries: Norman Studio; Onyx Films
- Website: mediawankidsandfamily.com/studios/22

Method Animation (formerly known as Method Films) is a French animation studio owned by Mediawan through its Kids & Family division founded in 1998 by Aton Soumache. The studio produces CGI and 2D animated shows. It came together in 2014 as the culmination of a merger of Dimitri Rassam's Chapter 2 and Alexis Vonarb's Onyx Films. In 2018, Mediawan (which was founded by Xavier Niel, Matthieu Pigasse and Pierre-Antoine Capton in 2015) obtained a majority stake in Method Animation through its acquisition of ON Kids & Family and ON Entertainment.

== History ==
In 1996 while during the production of Christian Volckman's short Maaz, producer Aton Soumache and Alexis Vonarb launched his own production company dedicated to short films and feature films named Onyx Films.

A year in September 1997, Aton Soucmache and Alexis Vonarb entered the TV business by launching Method Animation which was known as Method Films at that time.

In December 1999, It was announced that Method Films had teamed up with Paris-based animation studio Millimages to launch a new stop-motion animation joint-venture studio based in Paris which would be named Gimmick. The new animation studio will work on Method Films in-house projects along with Millimages' works and would work on co-productions as well as outside clients such as TV adverts. Their first programme related to the partnership was Skyland.

In August 2006, Method Films and its CGI animation production unit Onyx Films formed a joint venture with Indian animation and visual effects company DQ Entertainment to produce its feature films.

In late February 2008, Method Films announced that their Indian animation production partner DQ Entertainment had acquired a 20% stake in French animation studio Method Films, expanding their partnership with them.

In January 2014, Method Animation along with their feature animation subsidiary Onyx Films (including its post-production & CGI feature studio Onyx Lux) and French live-action film production company Chapter 2 announced that they had merged by their founders Aton Soumache and Dimitri Rassam to form a new animation and film audiovisual production group named ON Entertainment with the new company launching its focus on their animated series and feature films along with live-action films. Method Animation and its feature film subsidiary Onyx Films alongside drama film production company Chapter 2 became labels of the new production and audiovisual group as Method Animation became the parent company of ON Entertainment and was placed under the new company's animation label under their ON Kids & Family division with Method's feature film subsidiary Onyx Films moved from the former to become ON's animated feature film division alongside live-action film production house Chapter 2 which became ON's live-action film production label.

Two years later in December 2017, it was announced that a European-based French special-acquisition company named Mediawan was in exclusive talks to buy a majority stake in Method Animation's parent ON Entertainment alongside the former animation label under the latter's ON Kids & Family division and their live-action film production house Chapter 2 including ON's feature film division ON Animation Studios, their post-production & CGI feature studio Onyx Lux and their Montreal-based feature animation production studio for about €50 million in order for Mediawan to enter the animation and feature film business. A year later in June 2018, Mediawan completed their acquisition of a majority stake in Method Animation alongside its parent ON Entertainment and renamed it ON Kids & Family after their division with Chapter 2 split from ON and moved under Mediawan's portfolio.

In February 2017, Method Animation alongside producer of Miraculous: Tales of Ladybug and Cat Noir, ZAG Entertainment, signed a co-production partnership with Spanish-Italian children's entertainment licensing company Planeta Junior (now DeAPlaneta Entertainment) to handle two new series produced by Method Animation alongside ZAG Entertainment under the latter's Zag Heroez brand, such as Power Players and Zak Storm, while Planeta Junior will handle licensing of the brand's programs in its territories.

In April 2019 one year after Mediawan's acquisition of ON Entertainment and their division ON Kids & Family, ON Kids & Family and their parent company Mediawan announced that they've established a partnership with world-renowned French producer, illustrator and author Joann Sfar to develop the author's works into film and television adaptations with the acquisition of a majority stake in Joann Sfar's animation production company Nice Pictures and had it placed under ON Kids & Family.

In June 2020, ON Kids & Family and its parent company Mediawan announced that they have rebranded their Joann Sfar's Paris-based production company Nice Pictures as their mini-studio renaming it to Magical Society with Veteran animation producer and founder of Method Animation and producer Aton Soumache and award-winning publisher Joann Sfar heading the rebranded company.

In February 2021, ON Kids & Family announced that they've expanded their TV state into preschool television series and has partnered with Chinese toy manufacturer and global media company Alpha Group Co. Ltd to jointly develop ON's first preschool animated series named Petronix Defenders with Alpha Group develop toys made for the show and will distribute the show in Asia-Pacific and MENA while Mediawan's distribution arm Mediawan Rights will distribute the show worldwide elsewhere.

In June 2021, Method Animation had joined forces with Universal Music France, the French subsidiary of the major Dutch/American global music corporation Universal Music Group, to produce an anthology music animated TV series for young adult audiences, entitled Jam with the Australian filmmaker & director of The Greatest Showman, Michael Gracey, would serve as the director of the series & Method Animation's rooster of talent Robert Valley, Félicie Haymoz, Sylvain Chomet and Joann Sfar would serve as creator and would animate episodes for the series; however no other announcement of that series had been made since.

In June 2022, when ON Kids & Family's parent company Mediawan announced that they're bringing all of their kids and family activities and ramping up their youth entertainment content, it was announced that Mediawan had rebranded ON Kids & Family and relaunching it as a new division under the Mediawan name which was renamed Mediawan Kids & Family, marking the end of the ON name after 7 years with Method Animation, Magical Society, ON Animation Studios and ON Classics becoming part of the newly renamed division with the latter two retaining the ON name. Mediawan Kids & Family and their parent company Mediawan also announced that they've launched two new production labels which was traditional animation production studio Somewhere Animation and live-action studio Elliott Studio along with Mediawan Kids & Family launching their own distribution division named Mediawan Kids & Family Distribution that will handle all of their original live-action and animated productions along with third-party programmes. Three days later in that same month, Method Animation had joined forces with Miraculous creator Thomas Astruc, Shibuya Productions and Japanese animation studio Tezuka Productions to reboot Osamu Tezuka's best-selling manga series Astro Boy into a new CGI half-hour animated series which will be named Astro Boy Reboot.

In December 2022, Method Animation along with their parent Mediawan Kids & Family announced that they have hired Katell France the founder of her animation studio Onikiri as Chief Content Officer and managing director of the Method Animation label.

In February 2023, Mediawan Kids & Family along with their parent company Mediawan had announced that they've acquired a majority stake in Bristol-based British scripted and animation production company Wildseed Studios, marking Mediawan's youth entertainment division Mediawan Kids & Family's first international acquisition with Wildseed Studios becoming part of Mediawan Kids & Family as their own production label. Two months later in April of that same year, Method Animation and their parent division Mediawan Kids & Family had been expanded by their parent company Mediawan when they announced that they've acquired Amsterdam-based Dutch independent film & television production company and animation production studio Submarine, marking Mediawan Kids & Family's second expansion this time into the Netherlands.

== Key people ==
=== Aton Soumache ===
Aton Soumache is a producer of animated films. He is the CEO of Method Animation. Soumache is perhaps best known for The Little Prince, for which he, Rassam, Alexis Vonarb, and Mark Osborne won the 2016 César Award for Best Animated Film.

=== Dimitri Rassam ===
Dimitri Rassam is a film producer and founder of Chapter 2.

=== Alexis Vonarb ===
He was born in 1970, and is an alumnus of Robert Schuman University, Strasbourg. Then he studied at the University of Leicester in the UK. While working in production at La Fémis in 1995, he got to know Soumache. He founded Onyx Films, which went on to produce 15 films, including Renaissance (2006) which won an award at the Annecy International Animated Film Festival.

== Filmography ==
=== Television series ===
==== Method Animation ====
Title	Years	Network	Notes
The Gnoufs	2004–2007	France 3	
Flatmania	2004–2008	France 3 YTV (Canada)	co-production with Futurikon and Vivatoon
Planet Grabo	2005	France 2	co-production with Millimages and Amuse Films
Skyland	2006–2007	France 2 Teletoon (Canada)	co-production with 9 Story Entertainment, LuxAnimation and DQ Entertainment
Pop Secret	2006–2007	M6	co-production with Futurikon, Sony BMG Music Entertainment, 2 Minutes and 222 Records
Cosmic Quantum Ray	2007	M6; Animania HD (United States); Kika (Germany)	co-production with Mike Young Productions, Cosmotoons, Europool, Telegael, SK C&C, Independence Creative and Maya Entertainment; Owned by Splash Entertainment
Mikido	2007–2012	France 3/France 4	co-production with LuxAnimation and DQ Entertainment
Freefonix	2008–2009	CBBC	co-production with Cinnamon Entertainment, Toonz Animation and Isle of Man Film
The Pinky and Perky Show	2008	France 3 CBBC (United Kingdom)	co-production with Pinky & Perky Enterprises and DQ Entertainment
Iron Man: Armored Adventures	2009–2013	France 2/France 4 Nicktoons (United States)	co-production with Marvel Animation, DQ Entertainment, LuxAnimation (season 1), Isle of Man Film (season 1), Genius (season 1), Fabrique D'Images (season 2) and Onyx Lux (season 2)
Le Petit Nicolas	2009–2010	M6; ZDF (Germany)	co-production with M6 Studio, LuxAnimation, DQ Entertainment and ZDF Enterprises
The Little Prince	2010–2015	France 3 WDR (Germany); Rai 2/Rai Yoyo (Italy)	co-production with LPPTV, LP Animation, DQ Entertainment, Fabrique D'Images, Rai Fiction, Sony Pictures Home Entertainment (seasons 1–2), AB Productions (season 3) and ARD
Chaplin & Co	2011–2012	France 3	co-production with MK2, DQ Entertainment and Fabrique D'Images
The New Adventures of Peter Pan	2012–2016	France 3 ZDF (Germany)	co-production with DQ Entertainment, Story Board Animation, ZDF Enterprises and De Agostini Editore; Co-owned by ZDF Studios
Super 4	2014–2018	France 3	co-production with Morgen Studios
Robin Hood: Mischief in Sherwood	2014–present	TF1; Disney Channel France (seasons 1–2); ZDF (Germany); DeA Kids (Italy, season 1)	co-production with ZDF Studios, DQ Entertainment (seasons 1–2), Fabrique D'Images (season 1), De Agostini Editore (season 1), ON Kids & Family (seasons 2–3) and KidsMe (season 3)
Miraculous: Tales of Ladybug & Cat Noir	2015–2023	TF1/TFX	co-production with ZAG Entertainment, Toei Animation (seasons 1–5), Toei Animation Europe S.A.S. (seasons 1–5), SAMG Entertainment (seasons 1–3), SK Broadband (seasons 1–3), De Agostini Editore (seasons 2–5) and Gravity Animation (season 5) continued by Miraculous Corp. starting with season 6
Popples	2015–2016	Netflix (Worldwide); Gulli & Tiji	co-production with Saban Brands, Zagtoon, DQ Entertainment, Nexus Factory and Umedia
Seven and Me	2016–2019	France 3 Rai Gulp (Italy); ProSieben (Germany)	co-production with AB Productions, DQ Entertainment, Nexus Factory, ZDF Enterprises, Rai Fiction (season 1) and Rai Ragazzi (season 2)
Zak Storm	2016–2018	Canal J & Gulli	co-production with Zagtoon, SAMG Animation, MNC Animation, SK Broadband, Man of Action Studios, PGS Entertainment and De Agostini Editore
Denver the Last Dinosaur	2018	M6	co-production with Zagtoon, Nexus Factory, UMedia and PGS Entertainment
The Psammy Show	2018–2019	Disney Channel France; Disney Channel Germany (Germany)	co-production with DQ Entertainment
Apollo's Tall Tales	2019	France 5 & TiJi; ZDF (Germany)	co-production with Bidibul Productions, PGS Entertainment and ZDF Enterprises
Power Players	2019–2021	France 4 Cartoon Network (United States); Discovery Kids Latin America (Latin America); WDR (Germany); Gloob (Brazil)	co-production with Zagtoon, Man of Action Studios, WDR Media Group and Kaibou
The Enchanted Village of Pinocchio	2022	France 5 Rai Yoyo (Italy)	co-production with Palomar, Rai Ragazzi and ZDF Studios; Co-owned with ZDF Studios
Petronix Defenders	2022	M6 & Gulli; Super RTL (Germany)	co-production with Alpha Group Co. Ltd and Palomar
The Little Prince and Friends	2023–present	France 5 WDR (Germany); Rai Yoyo (Italy); Gloob (Brazil)	co-production with Bidibul Productions, LPPTV and Rai Kids
Pirate Academy	2024–present	M6 & Canal J ZDF (Germany)	co-production with Toonz Entertainment, Telegael, ZDF Studios and KidsMe
The 3 Musketeers	2025–present	France 4 Rai Gulp (Italy); ZDF (Germany)	co-production with Palomar, ZDF Studios and Rai Kids
Mr. Crocodile	2025–present	France Televisions; Nickelodeon (International)	under Magical Society
Ki & Hi in the Panda Kingdom	2025–present	Canal+ Kids; Auvio Kids TV (Belgium)	co-production with Drawsome Studio and Belvision
Witch Detectives	2026–present	TF1; Super RTL (Germany); Gloob (Brazil); CBBC (United Kingdom); Rai Gulp (Italy)	co-production with Toonz Entertainment, Entourage Media, Telegael and Rai Kids
Tuff Pom	2026–present	France 4 CBBC (United Kingdom)	co-production with Wildseed Studios and Telegael
Karters	Late 2026	TF1; Cartoonito (EMEA)	co-production with DeAPlaneta Entertainment
Astro Boy Reboot	Q3 2027	TF1; ZDF (Germany)	co-production with Tezuka Productions, Shibuya Productions and ZDF Studios
Artefacts, Thieves of Thieves	TBA	TF1	Originally developed at Somewhere Animation
Claynosauruz	TBA	YouTube	co-production with Claynosauruz Inc.
Taïtikis Guardians of the Oceans	TBA	TBA	
Anansi	TBA	TBA	co-production with Diprente
Jet the Vet	TBA	TBA	
Tales of the Mirru: Vet Explorers	TBA	TBA	co-production with Good Hero
Littlest Robot	TBA	TBA	co-production with Toon2Tango and V House Animation
Wadoo	TBA	TBA	co-production with El Reino Infantil
Prout	TBA	TBA	co-production with Wajnbrosse Productions
Eldrador	TBA	TBA	co-production with Toon2Tango and Schleich
Pango	TBA	TBA	co-production with Studio Pango

==== Submarine ====
Title	Years	Network	Notes
Ask Lara	2011	NPO 3 BBC Two (United Kingdom); TV3 (Spain)	co-production with Red Kite Animation and Tomavistas
WellieWishers	2016–2017	Amazon Prime Video	co-production with Mattel Creations; Rights owned by Mattel Studios
Undone	2019–2022	Amazon Prime Video	co-production with Amazon Studios, The Tornante Company, Hive House Project, Boxer vs. Raptor (season 1) and Vegan Blintzes (season 2); Owned by Amazon MGM Studios

==== Somewhere Animation ====
Title	Years	Network	Notes
Chefclub Adventures	TBA	TBA	co-production with Snacking Media
Temtem	TBA	TBA	co-production with Marla Studio and Kiss A Frog
Chococat & Me	TBA	TBA	

=== Films ===
Title	Release date	Distributor	Notes
Renaissance	March 15, 2006	Pathé Distribution	co-production with Pathé, Millimages, LuxAnimation, France 2 Cinema and Timefirm Limited
La León	July 11, 2007	MK2 Diffusion; 791 Cine (Argentina)	under Onyx Films co-production with Big World, Polar Films, Morocha Films and Mandragona Producciones
Trouble at Timpetill	December 17, 2008	Pathe Distribution	co-production with Chapter 2 and LuxAnimation
The Prodigies	June 8, 2011	Warner Bros. Pictures	co-production with Studio 37, Fidelite Films, DQ Entertainment and LuxAnimation
Upside Down	August 31, 2012 (Canada); April 17, 2013 (France)	Warner Bros. Pictures (France); Les Films Séville (Canada)	Live-action film co-production with Kinology, Transfilm International, Studio 37, Jorour Productions and France 2 Cinema
The Little Prince	July 15, 2015	Paramount Pictures (France); Lucky Red Distribuzione (Italy)	co-production with Orange Studio, M6 Films, LPPTV and Lucky Red
Mune: Guardian of the Moon	October 15, 2015	Paramount Pictures	co-production with Orange Studio and Kinology
Tall Tales from the Magical Garden of Antoon Krings	December 13, 2017	Gebeka Films	under ON Classics co-production with Bidibul Productions
Playmobil: The Movie	August 7, 2019 (France); August 9, 2019 (United Kingdom); December 9, 2019 (United States)	Pathe Distribution; StudioCanal (United Kingdom)	co-production with DMG Entertainment, M6 Films, Morgen Studios and Wild Bunch
Little Vampire	October 21, 2020	StudioCanal	under Magical Society co-production with StudioCanal, Autochenille Productions, France 3 Cinema and Panache Productions
Little Nicholas: Happy As Can Be	October 12, 2022	BAC Films	under ON Classics co-production with Bidibul Productions
Ladybug & Cat Noir: The Movie	July 5, 2023	SND	co-production with The Awakening Production, SND, Cross Creek Pictures and Fantawild
A Magnificent Life	October 15, 2025	Wild Bunch; Sony Pictures Classics (United States)	under ON Classics co-production with What the Prod., Bidibul Productions, Walking the Dog and Align
The Badalisc	TBA	TBA	as ON Entertainment
Little Jules Verne	TBA	TBA	as ON Entertainment
Twisted	Coming 2027	Le Pacte	co-production with Palomar, Sola Media and France 3 Cinema
