= Ricky Zoom =

Animated children's television series

- Genre: Comedy; Adventure
- Created by: Alexander Bar
- Directed by: Romain Villemaine; Franck Michel
- Voices of: Max Fincham; Bradley Bissett; Leo Templer; Twinkle Jaiswal; Frances White; Edward Molony
- Theme music composer: Steve Mandile
- Composer: Fabrice Aboulker
- Countries of origin: France; Pakistan; United Kingdom; China; Italy
- Original language: English
- No. of seasons: 2
- No. of episodes: 52 (104 segments)

Production
- Executive producers: Olivier Dumont; Massimo Carrier Ragazzi
- Producers: Jean-Pierre Quenet; Guillaume Hellouin; Corinne Kouper; Caroline Souris
- Running time: 11 minutes
- Production companies: Entertainment One; TeamTO; Youku Kids; Frog Box; Rai Ragazzi; Maga Animation Studio

Original release
- Network: Gulli (France); RAI (Italy); Youku Kids (China)
- Release: 28 June 2019 – 2021

Ricky Zoom is an animated children's television series created by Alexander Bar and produced by Hasbro's Entertainment One subsidiary and Frog Box in collaboration with Maga Animation Studio, TeamTO, Youku Kids and Rai Ragazzi. The series was first released on Youku Kids on June 28, 2019.

== Synopsis ==
Set in the town of Wheelford, the series follows young anthropomorphic motorcycle Ricky Zoom and his friends, Loop Hoopla, Scootio Whizzbang and DJ Rumbler. They form the "Bike Buddies" and have adventures in their community, and Ricky dreams of becoming a rescue bike just like his parents and his idol, Steel Awesome.

== Characters ==
=== Main ===
- Ricky Zoom (voiced by Max Fincham) is an anthropomorphic red motorcycle with dark blue eyes and equipped with rescue gadgets who dreams of becoming a rescue bike like his parents. His symbol is a Z, which stands for his last name.
- Loop Hoopla (voiced by Bradley Bissett) is a blue dirt bike with green eyes and paddle tires who can hover via boosters on his side. He loves doing wild stunts. His symbol is a spiral. Loop is the only Bike Buddy other than Ricky to have a sibling, but he is also the only one not to have his mother appear.
- DJ Rumbler (voiced by Leo Templer) is a green 3-wheeled ATV motorcycle with brown eyes, and is equipped with a robotic arm and several tool attachments. His symbol is a criss-crossed screwdriver and hammer. He is extremely strong, capable of pulling several hundred pounds unassisted.
- Scootio Wizzbang (voiced by Twinkle Jaiswal) is a yellow scooter with blue eyes, and is equipped with a drone called a Zoomcam and miniature robots called ScootBops. She keeps a tablet in her front wheel arch. Her symbol is a sun. Scootio is the only female of the main four Bike Buddies.

=== Recurring ===
- Toot Zoom (voiced by Frances White) is a little lavender motorcycle with blue eyes, and Ricky's younger sister. Sweet yet sassy, Toot is always eager to get in on some fun with the Bike Buddies whenever she can – though her habit of recounting embarrassing tales and titbits about Ricky means that although he adores her, he can be resistant to having her around! They think of her rather like an extra set of wheels: nice to have around when you need them, but whoever heard of a bike with four wheels?! However, though smaller than the other buddies, Toot is impossible to ignore – and often ends up stealing the show!
- Hank Zoom is a red adult motorcycle with blue eyes who is Ricky and Toot's father. He has a special job as a rescue bike which Ricky wants to be when he grows up.
- Helen Zoom is an orange adult motorcycle with green eyes who is Ricky and Toot's mother. She had a past life as the Wheelford Wheeler, a bike who rescues those in need and vanishes before anyone found out who she was.
- Dasher Zoom is a Lightblue pre-teenage motorcycle with green eyes which is Ricky and Toot's cousin and Hank and Helen's nephew, he loves racing.
- Steel Awesome is a superhero that Ricky idolizes. Movie star, comic-book hero and huge celebrity, stunt bike Steel Awesome has packs of adoring fans... including himself! Bold, brave and handsome (and doesn't he know it!), he loves doing his own extravagant movie stunts. Though he can be who absurdly over-the-top, Steel is the epitome of what an action bike can be, and Ricky idolises him for it. Ricky dreams of becoming his sidekick, Vroom Boy, so that Steel will teach him all he knows about being a daring and courageous bike. He speaks with an American accent.
- Maxwell is a bike who runs the garage. Good-natured Maxwell and his Service Station are at the heart of the community, providing everything a bike needs along with the latest Wheelford news and gossip, as well as plenty of tales of the good ol’ days! A trusted and valued member of the community, Maxwell is also leader of Ramp Camp, the outdoor club that all the Buddies love being a part of, and he enjoys using his experience of the world to help the Buddies learn and grow.
- Blip Hoopla is Loop's big brother, 13-year-old Blip will deliver just about anything, to anyone, anywhere – but he still has a lot to learn about being a good delivery bike. He seems to have a knack for losing things and, though he tries very hard to be careful, something always seems to upset his deliveries. He sometimes feels that the whole universe is against him.
- Don Hoopla is Blip and Loop's single father is Wheelford's resident mail carrier who takes great pride in making sure every parcel is delivered safely to its rightful owner. A skilled off-road bike like Loop, he delivers the mail come rain, shine, or snow! Don also delivers pizzas in addition to the mail, and always carries pictures of Loop and Blip with him.
- Whoopie Wizzbang is Scootio's mother. She and Helen Zoom used to compete against each other and win when they were in school.
- Fred Wizzbang is Scootio's father.
- Della Rumbler is DJ's mother and a construction worker. She is unnamed in the show.
- Jake Rumbler is DJ's father and a construction worker.
- Officer Bunker is Wheelford's police bike. Officer Bunker takes his duties very seriously indeed! He has committed each and every last rule of the Wheelford Highway Code to heart and patrols its highways and byways ensuring that bikes, both young and old, abide by the rules to ensure the safety of the townsfolk. But behind his strict exterior lies a heart of gold. He's really just a big softy who particularly loves the Bike Buddies, seeing a lot of himself as a young bike in them. He'd love to impart the lessons he's learned since he took off his training wheels — if only they would stay still long enough to listen! He is the only bike that can get out of a pothole on his own. He speaks with a Scottish accent.
- Buster Bunker (voiced by Edward Molony) is Officer Bunker's grandson and Toot's best friend.
- Mrs. Bikely is an enthusiastic and inspiring teacher, Mrs. Bikely is committed to helping her students grow up to be the best bikes they can be. Her spirited and fun lessons and projects help the Bike Buddies develop their initiative, imagination, and independence. She also has a not-so-secret crush on Steel Awesome. Though she is referred to as a "Mrs.", it is unknown if she has ever been married.

== Production ==
On August 22, 2019, it was announced that Hasbro would acquire Entertainment One for $4 billion, giving them ownership of Ricky Zoom. On December 30, 2019, the $3.8 billion deal was closed.

On September 5, 2019, it was announced that the series would premiere in the United States on September 9, 2019. On February 9, 2020, it was announced that eOne had renewed the series for a second season containing 52 11-minute episodes, which premiered on November 16, 2020.

== Broadcast ==
Internationally, the series airs on Super RTL in Germany, Yle TV2 in Finland, Clan TV in Spain, Gulli in France, Nickelodeon, Kabillion and Peacock in the United States, RAI in Italy, Discovery Kids in Latin America, Karusel in Russia, and ViuTV in Hong Kong. As of April 2020, the series has aired on Channel 5's Milkshake! in the United Kingdom.

== Episodes ==
No.	Title	Directed by	Written by	Storyboard by	U.S. air date	Prod. code	U.S. viewers (millions)
1	"Ricky Wobbles"	Romain Villemaine	Kathryn Walton Ward & Sylvie Barro	Richard Fabby	September 2, 2019	104	0.98
1	"The Out of Controller"	Romain Villemaine & Franck Michel	Robert Vargas	Stéphane Sichère & Lucile Vannier	September 2, 2019	104	0.98
2	"Flat Out Awesome"	Romain Villemaine & Franck Michel	Diana Moore	Riccardo Audisio & Thibault Descamps	September 9, 2019	101	0.33
2	"Ricky's Rescue Coaching Badge"	Romain Villemaine	Ethan Banville	Gaston Jaunet	September 9, 2019	101	0.33
3	"The Most Amazing Thing Put in a Box Ever"	Romain Villemaine	Doug Sinclair	Lucile Vannier & Sébastien Hivert	September 10, 2019	102	0.42
3	"The New Rescue Tool"	Romain Villemaine & Franck Michel	Robert Vargas	Riccardo Audisio & Jean-François Galataud	September 10, 2019	102	0.42
4	"New Bike On the Block"	Romain Villemaine	Jeffrey Paul Kearney	Christian Kuntz	September 11, 2019	103	0.44
4	"Little Buster Bunker"	Romain Villemaine	Doug Sinclair	Patrick George	September 11, 2019	103	0.44
5	"The Wheelford Wheeler"	Romain Villemaine & Franck Michel	Jennifer Daley	Stéphane Sichère & Olivier Reynal	September 12, 2019	105	0.30
5	"Ricky's Role Model"	Romain Villemaine & Franck Michel	Doug Sinclair	Stéphane Sichère & Sébastien Hivert	September 12, 2019	105	0.30
6	"Ricky Blows Away the Competition"	Romain Villemaine	Doug Sinclair	Richard Fabby	September 16, 2019	106	0.38
6	"Blip Delivers"	Romain Villemaine	Doug Sinclair	Stéphane Sichère & Lucile Vannier	September 16, 2019	106	0.38
7	"Starring Ricky"	Romain Villemaine	Diana Moore	Nicolas Moschini & Sébastien Hivert	September 17, 2019	107	0.41
7	"True Loopness"	Romain Villemaine	Doug Sinclair	Alexandre Edeline	September 17, 2019	107	0.41
8	"Tired and True"	Romain Villemaine & Franck Michel	Doug Sinclair	Olivier Reynal	September 18, 2019	108	0.44
8	"Scootio Changes Lanes"	Romain Villemaine	Doug Sinclair	Gaston Jaunet	September 18, 2019	108	0.44
9	"Problem at Windshield Point"	Romain Villemaine	Doug Sinclair	Julien Charles	October 21, 2019	112	0.41
9	"Two Wheel Justice"	Romain Villemaine	Aron Dunn	Riccardo Audisio & Lucile Vannier	October 21, 2019	112	0.41
10	"Super Awesome Magnet"	Romain Villemaine	Marie Beardmore	Patrick George	October 22, 2019	110	0.40
10	"Time Capsule"	Romain Villemaine	Jennifer Daley	Richard Fabby	October 22, 2019	110	0.40
11	"Ricky's on a Roll"	Romain Villemaine	Steve Westren	Gaston Jaunet	October 23, 2019	109	0.47
11	"Rock the Float"	Romain Villemaine	Doug Sinclair	Richard Fabby	October 23, 2019	109	0.47
12	"The Mega-Whirely-Leap"	Romain Villemaine	Ashley Mendoza	Luc Blanchard	October 24, 2019	114	0.37
12	"Trike Trials"	Romain Villemaine	Doug Sinclair	Marc Sierra	October 24, 2019	114	0.37
13	"Wheeloween"	Romain Villemaine	Ashley Mendoza	Luc Blanchard & Sylvie Sanna	October 25, 2019	111	0.54
13	"Zoom Encounters"	Romain Villemaine	Aron Dunn	Jeff Galataud & Eric Dragon	October 25, 2019	111	0.54
14	"SantaCycle Down"	Romain Villemaine	Doug Sinclair	Julien Charles	December 6, 2019	113	0.55
14	"Shining"	Romain Villemaine	Ashley Mendoza	Julien Charles	December 6, 2019	113	0.55
15	"Ramp It Up"	Romain Villemaine	John Slama	Gaston Jaunet	January 13, 2020	115A	0.39
16	"Toot & the Wheelies"	Romain Villemaine	Ashley Mendoza	Patrick George	January 14, 2020	115B	0.33
17	"Family Sports Day"	Romain Villemaine	Doug Sinclair	Alexandre Edeline	January 15, 2020	116A	0.35
18	"Trading Places"	Romain Villemaine	Ashley Mendoza	Richard Fabby	January 16, 2020	116B	0.40
19	"Saving Mr. Speedy"	Romain Villemaine	Doug Sinclair	Christian Kuntz	January 17, 2020	117A	0.34
20	"Toot's Invisible Friend"	Romain Villemaine	Diana Moore	Patrick George	March 9, 2020	117B	0.25
21	"Ruled by Ricky"	Romain Villemaine	Ashley Mendoza	Alexandre Edeline	March 10, 2020	119A	0.29
22	"Mrs. Bikely Up All Nightly"	Romain Villemaine	Alex Williams	Luc Blanchard & Sylvie Sanna	March 11, 2020	119B	0.29
23	"Blip in Charge"	Romain Villemaine	David Dias	Julien Charles	March 12, 2020	118A	0.34
24	"The Crosswalk Helper"	Romain Villemaine	Sheila Dinsmore	Christian Kuntz	March 13, 2020	118B	0.22
25	"Show & Tell Trouble"	Romain Villemaine	Sheila Dinsmore	Stéphane Sichère	May 18, 2020	120	0.35
25	"Steel Awesome Meets Vroomboy"	Romain Villemaine	Doug Sinclair	Luc Blanchard & Sylvie Sanna	May 18, 2020	120	0.35
26	"False Alarm"	Romain Villemaine	Doug Sinclair	Marc Sierra	May 19, 2020	121A	0.34
27	"The Zoomtastic Gang"	Romain Villemaine	Ashley Mendoza	Richard Fabby	May 20, 2020	121B	0.39
28	"Loop Hero of Wheelford"	Romain Villemaine	Stephen Senders	Richard Fabby	May 21, 2020	122A	0.42
29	"Toot De Suite"	Romain Villemaine	Vanina Marsot	Lucile Vannier	May 22, 2020	122B	0.38
30	"Maxwell Gets a Little Help"	Romain Villemaine	Kendra Hibbert	Richard Fabby	May 25, 2020	123	0.29
30	"Ricky's Litter Round Up"	Romain Villemaine	Ethan Banville	Luc Blanchard & Sylvie Sanna	May 25, 2020	123	0.29
31	"The Ramp Camp Bikeout"	Romain Villemaine	Doug Sinclair	Jeff Galataud & Eric Dragon	May 26, 2020	124	0.33
31	"The Gold Ticket Rush"	Romain Villemaine	Ashley Mendoza	Julien Charles	May 26, 2020	124	0.33
32	"Ricky's in a Twist"	Romain Villemaine	Doug Sinclair	Luc Blanchard & Sylvie Sanna	May 27, 2020	125	0.41
32	"RepairBops"	Romain Villemaine	Vanina Marsot	Richard Fabby	May 27, 2020	125	0.41
33	"Slippy Street"	Romain Villemaine	Steve Westren	Gaston Jaunet	May 28, 2020	126A	0.29
34	"Bike Buddies Super Speedy Delivery Service"	Romain Villemaine	Doug Sinclair	Patrick George	May 29, 2020	126B	0.26
