= Palomar (company) =

Italian television production company

Palomar S.p.A.
- Type: Società per azioni (S.p.A.)
- Industry: Entertainment
- Founded: 1986; 40 years ago
- Founder: Carlo Degli Esposti
- Headquarters: Rome, Italy
- Key people: Carlo Degli Esposti (President); Nicola Serra (CEO)
- Products: Films; Television series
- Parent: Mediawan (2019–present)
- Website: palomaronline.com

Palomar S.p.A. is an Italian television production company founded by Carlo Degli Esposti.

== History ==
Palomar was founded by Carlo Degli Esposti in 1986. In January 2019, French media conglomerate Mediawan acquired a majority stake in the company. The following year, the company launched a documentaries unit.

== Filmography ==
=== Film ===
Year	Title	Director	Notes	Ref.
2001	Mostly Martha	Sandra Nettelbeck		
2006	Along the Ridge	Kim Rossi Stuart		
2007	Cardiofitness	Fabio Tagliavia		
2007	Piano, solo	Riccardo Milani		
2010	We Believed	Mario Martone		
2011	The First on the List	Roan Johnson		
2012	Steel	Stefano Mordini		
2012	A Special Day	Francesca Comencini		
2013	How Strange to Be Named Federico	Ettore Scola		
2013	L'intrepido	Gianni Amelio		
2014	Leopardi	Mario Martone		
2019	Piranhas	Claudio Giovannesi		
2020	Hidden Away	Giorgio Diritti		
2020	The Life Ahead	Edoardo Ponti		
2021	Fly Me Away	Christophe Barratier	Co-produced with Chapter 2, France 2 Cinéma, and LPDR II	
2022	Still Time	Alessandro Aronadio		
2023	Thank You Guys	Riccardo Milani		
2023	A Hundred Sundays	Antonio Albanese		
2023	Palazzina Laf	Michele Riondino		
2024	The Children's Train	Cristina Comencini		
2024	Hey Joe	Claudio Giovannesi		
2025	Duse	Pietro Marcello		
2026	Lavoreremo da grandi	Antonio Albanese		
2026	Changer l'eau des fleurs	Jean-Pierre Jeunet		
TBA	Twisted	Lino DiSalvo	Co-produced with Mediawan Kids & Family Cinema, Sola Media and France 3 Cinema	
TBA	Super Santos	Ciro Visco		

=== Television ===
Year	Title	Network	Notes	Ref.
1999–2021	Inspector Montalbano	Rai 1		
2005–2007	Gente di mare	Rai 1		
2007	Bartali: The Iron Man	Rai 1		
2012–2013	L'isola	Rai 1		
2012–2015	The Young Montalbano	Rai 1		
2013–present	Murders at Barlume	Sky Cinema		
2014–2016	Braccialetti rossi	Rai 1		
2019	The Name of the Rose	Rai 1		
2022	The Enchanted Village of Pinocchio	Rai Yoyo; France 5 (France)	Co-produced with Method Animation, Rai Ragazzi, and ZDF Studios	
2023–present	Call My Agent - Italia	Sky Atlantic		
2024	The Count of Monte Cristo	Rai 1		
2025–present	My Family	Netflix		
2025–present	Le tre moschettiere	Rai Gulp; France 4 (France); ZDF (Germany)	Co-produced with Method Animation, ZDF Studios, and Rai Kids	
2025	Sara: Woman in the Shadows	Netflix		
