= The Gnoufs =

French animated television series

The Gnoufs is an animated cartoon created by Bertrand Santini that was shown on France 3, Toon Disney and Canal Panda. It was produced by Method Animation.

The program is about explorers from another world who have come to Earth to live. The show is computer-animated, and many episodes pivot on supernatural themes such as divinatory tarot, apparitions and the afterlife. Each episode has a moral message.

There a total of seven Gnoufs, starting with Groo Gnouf as their unofficial leader. The rest are Rab Gnouf, Giga Bab, Hippel Gnouf, Mini Bab, Kreepy Gnouf and Scopi Gnouf.
