= Pascal Breton =

French Producer & CEO

- Occupations: TV & Film Producer, Writer,
- Years active: 1981–present

Pascal Breton is a French Producer & CEO especially known for creating the French Soap Opera Sous le soleil (aka St Tropez) and the first French Netflix Original Marseille.

He is the former CEO & President of Marathon Media Group and the current CEO of Federation Entertainment.

== Biography ==
In 1990, Pascal Breton started his own production company, Marathon, in association with Olivier Brémond. In addition to managing the company, he worked on Marathon's hit productions, including Saint Tropez (480 × 52 minutes), Babar & Dolmen (6 × 90 minutes) among others.

At Zodiak, Pascal, acting as Senior Vice-president of Fiction, oversaw the distribution of Millennium as well as Versailles (Capa, Canal+).

In 2013, Pascal Breton launched Federation Entertainment, a new production and distribution studio dedicated to premium French and international series. There, he produced Netflix's first French series Marseille and co-produced the critically acclaimed French series The Bureau, an international success which was released on Amazon Prime UK & iTunes US, quickly reaching the Top 5 there. He is also co-producing upcoming series such as The Collection - Amazon's first European original about a fashion house in post-war Paris - and the Finnish noir series Bordertown, along with many other projects.

== Filmography ==
List of Producing & Writing Credits in Film and Television
Year	Title	Role	Notes
1989	Babar (TV Series)	Supervising Producer	Gemini Awards for Best Animated Program or Series (1989, 1990, 1992)
1995	The Mozart Band (TV Series)	Associate Producer	
1995	Nancy Drew (1995 TV Series)	Executive Producer	
1996	Berjac : Coup de maître (TV Movie)	Producer	
1996–2008	Sous le soleil (TV Series)	Creator; Delegate Producer (12 Episodes); Producer (18 Episodes)	Rose d'Or for Best Soap & Best Best Performance - Soap - Female (2004)
1997	Kassai and Leuk (TV Series)	Executive Producer	
1997	The Secret World of Santa Claus (TV Series)	Executive Producer; Series Concept	
1998–2000	Mythic Warriors: Guardians of the Legend (TV Series)	Executive Producer	
2000	Marsupilami (2000 TV Series)	Executive Producer	
2001	Queenie in Love	Executive Producer	
2002	Ken Park	Executive Producer	
2005	Tokyo Dogs (TV Movie documentary)	Producer	
2005	15/Love (TV Series)	Producer	
2007	Secrets (TV Mini-Series, original title: Suspectes)	Executive Producer	
2008	Pas de secrets entre nous (TV Series)	Producer & Creator	
2008	L'aventure antibiotique: La revanche des microbes	Producer	
2008	Sisterhood (TV Series - Original Title: Cinq Soeurs)	Creator	
2010	Millennium (Miniseries)	Producer	
2014	Sous le soleil de Saint-Tropez (Spinoff from Sous le soleil)	Co-Producer	
2015	The Bureau	Co-Producer	Series Mania International Press Award for Best Actor - Mathieu Kassovitz); TV Series Audience Award and TV Series Jury Special Prize at the Colcoa Festival.
2015	Versailles (TV Series)	Producer	
2016	Marseille (TV Series)	Producer	
2016	The Collection	Co-Producer	
