= Monello Productions =

French animation studio

- Type: Subsidiary
- Industry: Animation
- Founded: September 2013; 13 years ago
- Founders: Giorgio Welter; Cécile Sady
- Headquarters: 34 rue de Neuilly, Clichy, France
- Key people: Giorgio Welter (president); Cécile Sady (CEO)
- Parent: Tetra Media Studio (2013–2021); Banijay Kids & Family (2021–present)
- Divisions: Ollenom Studio
- Website: www.monello.fr

Monello Productions is a French animation studio founded in September 2013 by Giorgio Welter and Cécile Sady, who lead the company as president and CCO respectively.

In late-February 2017, Monello Productions and their former parent company Tetra Media Studio were acquired by British production and distribution company ITV Studios, which took a majority stake in Monello's former parent company Tetra Media Studio, the acquisition of Monello's former parent Tetra Media Studio had given ITV Studios an animation studio as Monello's founder Giorgio Welter remained as president following the acquisition.

In September 2017, four years before Banijay acquired the studio, Monello Productions had partnered with Paris-based French animation production company Watch Next Media to launch a joint venture distribution subsidiary based in Boulogne named Kids First Distribution giving Monello Productions their own in-house distribution subsidiary alongside Watch Next Media with former Tele Images producer and Watch Next Media founder Philippe Alessandri heading the joint venture distribution subsidiary while Marie Lassal had been tapped to handle the joint venture distribution subsidiary as their head of sales.

In April 2021, Paris-based production & distribution group Banijay announced they've acquired Monello Productions from ITV Studios-owned production company Tetra Media Studios and placed Monello Productions under their kids & family production subsidiary Zodiak Kids, giving Banijay an animation production studio as its distribution division Banijay Rights taken over Monello's productions from its previous distribution company Kids First Distribution whose 50% stake was acquired by its fellow animation studio Watch Next Media with Monello's founder continued leading Monello under Banijay.
