= Tiger Aspect Kids & Family =

British television production company

- Type: Subsidiary
- Industry: Television production
- Founded: 2002; 24 years ago
- Headquarters: London, United Kingdom
- Key people: Tom Beattie (managing director)
- Parent: Tiger Aspect (2002–2021); Banijay Kids & Family (2021–present)
- Website: www.banijaykidsandfamily.com/companies/tiger-aspect-kids-and-family/

Tiger Aspect Kids & Family is a British television production company founded in 2002 as the animation division of Tiger Aspect. It is currently led by Tom Beattie as managing director.

Both Tiger Aspect's animation division alongside Tiger Aspect were later brought by IMG Media Group the British television production division of sports media powerhouse IMG by 1 June 2006, before selling Tiger Aspect's animation division along with their parent company Tiger Aspect to Dutch media entertainment production & distribution company Endemol through its UK division giving the Dutch entertainment company an animation production subdivision and an entry into the animation business eleven years before Banijay acquired Endemol alongside Tiger Aspect and its animation division.
