= Movimenti Production =

Italian animation studio

- Type: Subsidiary
- Industry: Animation; Television production
- Founded: 2004; 22 years ago
- Founders: Giorgio Scorza; Davide Rosio; Roberto Cipriani
- Headquarters: Milan, Italy
- Key people: Giorgio Scorza and Davide Rosio (co-CEOs and Creative Directors); Cristiana Buzzelli (COO)
- Parent: ForFun Media (2019–2022); Banijay Kids & Family (2022–present)
- Website: www.movimenti.com

Movimenti Production is an Italian animation studio owned by French production & distribution company Banijay Entertainment through its division Banijay Kids & Family. It was founded in 2004 by Giorgio Scorza, Davide Rosio and Roberto Cipriani, with Scorza and Rosio leading the company as co-CEOs and Creative Directors.

In January 2019, Movimenti Production partnered with fellow Italian animation studio Studio Bozzetto & Co. to establish a new animation parent company called ForFun Media with Movimenti Production became a subsidiary of the new parent company. In that same year, Movimenti Production launched two animation studios which was traditional animation production studio DogHead Animation and CGI animation production studio MoBo Productions to handle Movimenti's 2D and 3D animated productions with Movimenti co-founders Giorgio Scorza and Davide Rosio heading the new animation production services under Movimenti. Also in the same year Movimenti also launched the production company Easy Peasy Entertainment as a joint venture with French publishing company Auzou Publishing.

In September 2022, French production & distribution group Banijay Entertainment announced it had acquired Italian animation production company Movimenti Production alongside its animation production services DogHead Animation and MoBo Productions from its parent ForFun Media and placed it under its children's division Banijay Kids & Family, the acquisition had given Banijay Kids & Family their own Italian animation studio and marked its first entry into the Italian animation market as Movimenti co-founders Giorgio Scorza and Davide Rosio continued leading the acquired animation studio with Banijay Rights started distributing Movimenti Production's shows.

Three months later in December of that year, Movimenti Production's new parent Banijay Kids & Family announced it had taken worldwide distribution and licensing rights to Movimenti Production's preschool animated series Topo Gigio (which Movimenti rebooted the classic character back in 2020) as Movimenti's new parent Banijay will expand the animated series into other services worldwide.
