= De Agostini =

Italian holding company

De Agostini S.p.A.
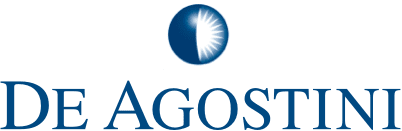

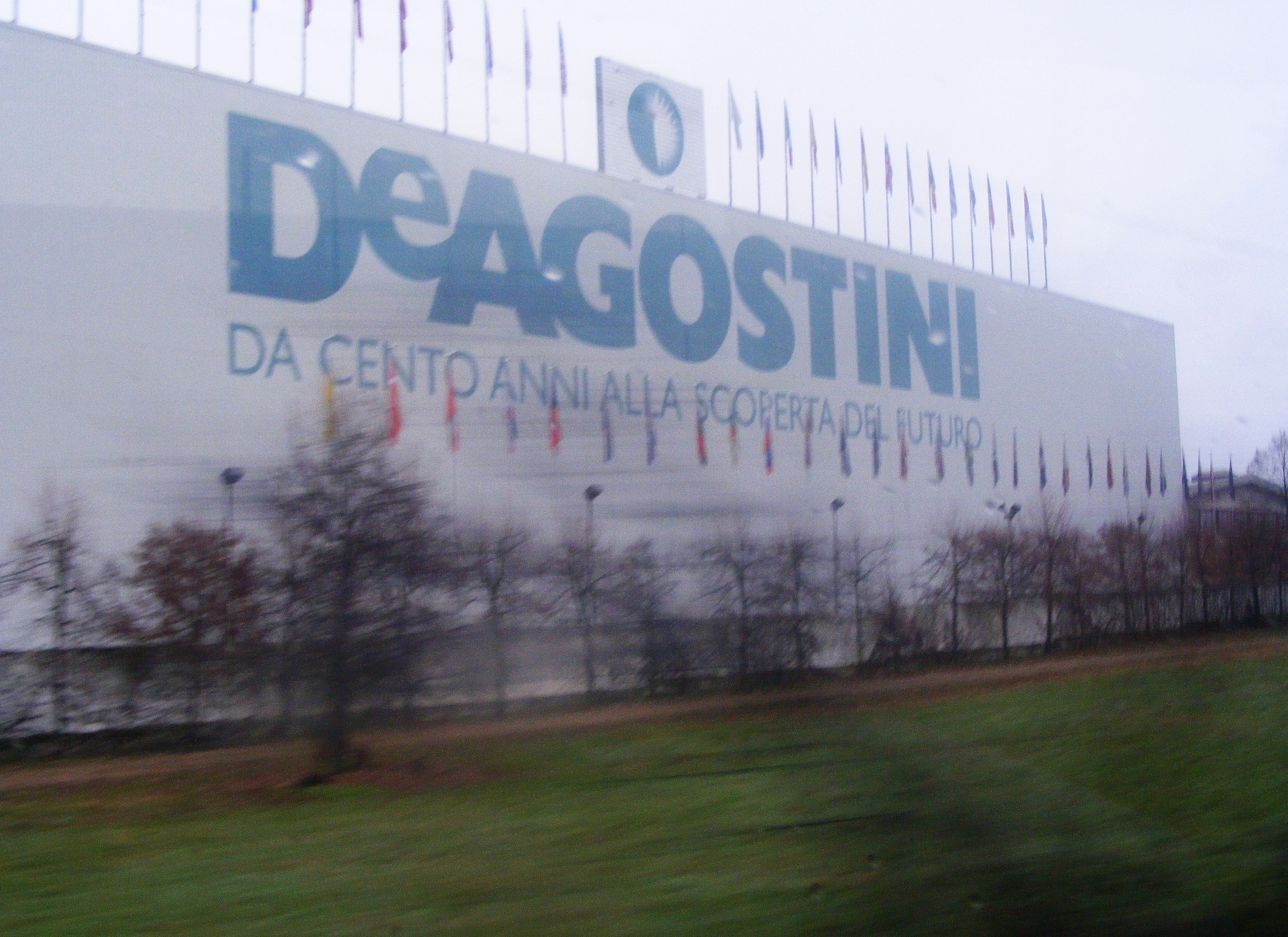
- Establishment in Novara, as seen from the Autostrada A4 motorway
- Type: Private
- Industry: Holding company
- Founded: 1901; 125 years ago
- Founder: Giovanni De Agostini
- Headquarters: Novara and Milan, Italy
- Area served: Italy; Japan; UK; US
- Key people: Marco Drago (chairman emeritus); Lorenzo Pellicioli (chairman); Enrico Drago (vice-chairman); Nicola Drago (vice-chairman); Marco Sala (CEO)
- Divisions: De Agostini Editore; De Agostini Communications; International Game Technology (42%); DeA Capital
- Website: www.gruppodeagostini.it/en

De Agostini S.p.A. is an Italian holding company that coordinates the strategic operating companies De Agostini Editore, De Agostini Communications, IGT, and DeA Capital, and makes financial investments, among which the main investment is a minority stake in Assicurazioni Generali. It is active worldwide in four sectors: publishing, media and communication, games and services, and finance. It was founded in 1901 by geographer Giovanni De Agostini in Rome, and later moved to Novara.

== Overview ==
De Agostini Editore S.p.A. is a publishing subsidiary, active in 30 countries with publications in 13 languages. It includes De Agostini Publishing, DeA Planeta Libri, De Agostini Scuola and Digital De Agostini, and Spanish publisher Planeta DeAgostini, a joint venture with Grupo Planeta.

De Agostini Communications is a media and communication subsidiary involving content production, broadcasting and content distribution for television, new media and cinema. DeAgostini owns a 4.8% stake in the Banijay Group, the parent company of Banijay Entertainment.

De Agostini is a shareholder of Atresmedia, the Spanish radio and television group, held in partnership with Spanish Planeta Corporation and listed on the Madrid Stock Exchange. It includes Atresmedia Televisión, Atresmedia Radio, Atresmedia Digital, Atresmedia Publicidad and Atresmedia Cine.

Geo4Map is a geographic and cartographic publisher. It was created in 2009 by geographic and cartographic employees of De Agostini. In 2015, it acquired the entire cartographic and geographic business branch of De Agostini Editore, and in 2016, it acquired the Libreria Geografica brand.

In 2021, De Agostini launched the Fanhome brand, which was used to sell DeAgostini products in the United States.

== History ==
The geographer Giovanni De Agostini, brother of the Salesian explorer Alberto Maria de Agostini, founded the De Agostini Geographical Institute in Rome in June 1901 and published a school atlas, that same year the first shop was inaugurated. In 1904, he started the publication of the Atlante de Agostini Calendar, a small volume with geographical news combined with the annual calendar.

== See also ==
- Partwork
