= Zodiak Kids & Family France =

French animation studio

- Formerly: Marathon Productions (1990–2001); Marathon Animation (2001–2007); Marathon Media (2007–2016); Zodiak Kids Studio France (2016–2021)
- Type: Subsidiary
- Industry: Animation; Television production
- Founded: February 1990; 36 years ago
- Founders: Pascal Breton; Olivier Bremond
- Headquarters: France
- Key people: Benoît Di Sabatino (CEO)
- Parent: Marathon Group (2006–2008); Zodiak Media (2008–2011); Banijay Kids & Family (2011–present)
- Website: www.banijaykidsandfamily.com/companies/zodiak-kids-family-france/

Former logo as Marathon Media (2006-2012)

Zodiak Kids & Family France (formerly Marathon Productions, Marathon Animation, Marathon Media and Zodiak Kids Studio France) is a French animation studio founded in 1990 by Pascal Breton and Olivier Bremond. Vincent Chalvon-Demersay joined the team in 1999 to develop Marathon's animation programming, along with David Michel. It is currently led by Benoît Di Sabatino as CEO.

== History ==
In September 2005 two years before De Agostini acquired Zodiak and six years before Zodiak launch its kids & family division, Marathon Media announced that they have made a merger deal with the French division of the British-based European private firm Bridgepoint Capital who owns French TV production group Tele Images, to create the biggest major production and distribution group based in France with Tele Images' subsidiaries GTV Productions and Adventure Line Productions producer of Fort Boyard being part of the new group along with Vincent Chalvon-Demersay and David Michel continuing to hold their stakes in Marathon's animation division. The following year in January 2006, Marathon Media had completed their merger with Groupe Tele Images into forming the biggest major production and distribution group based in France with the combined entity was subsequently named Marathon Group. In July 2007, it was announced that Italian-based holding company De Agostini had acquired animation studio Marathon Media along with its TV production and distribution parent company of Marathon Group (which owns Marathon Media), from Bridgepoint Capital, thus turning De Agostini from a multimedia company into a major European content production company.

In February 2008, Marathon Media's parent company Marathon Group announced that they acquired a majority stake in French independent production company of entertainment programs and documentaries KM Production merging KM's operations with Marathon's own operations, thrust reuniting KM Production with Marathon Group's subsidiary Adventure Line Productions (which were part of Canal+ owned StudioExpand until 2004) with the founder of KM Production Renaud Le Van Kim continued to operate the company.

In May 2008, Marathon Media's parent company, Marathon Group, and its owner, De Agostini announced that they had made a deal to acquire Swedish-based Scandinavian production and distribution company Zodiak Television AB, with De Agostini's own television divisions Marathon Group and Magnolia being merged with Zodiak Television AB into one global production and distribution company turning Zodiak from a European production empire to a single entertainment powerhouse. The acquisition was completed in November the same year, with Zodiak Television AB rebranded into Zodiak Entertainment with Marathon Media and Tele Images becoming subsidiaries of the rebranded company.

In February 2014, Marathon Media announced that its co-founder and general manager, David Michel, was stepping down.
