= March 9 =

March 9 this year in various calendars
- Monday, 9 March 2026
Akan	Kurudwo
Armenian	22 Areg 1475
Aztec	Tecuilhuitontli 18, 7 Miquiztli
Babylonian	19 Shabatu, 2336 SE
Balinese pawukon	Menga, Pasah, Laba, Keliwon, Paniron, Coma of Wayang, Brahma, Dangu, Suka
Bengali	24 Falgun, BS 1432
Chinese	Yang Water Horse・Heart Mansion; Fire Horse Year, Month 1, Day 21 (Jingzhe, 11 days until Chunfen)
Common Era	9 March 2026 CE
Coptic	30 Meshir, AM 1742
Egyptian	27 Epiphi, 2774 NE
Ethiopian	30 Yakātit, 2018 Amätä Məhrät
French Republican	Décade II, Nonidi de Ventôse de l'Année 234 de la République
Gregorian	9 March, AD 2026
Hebrew	20 Adar, AM 5786
Hindu	Viśākhā・Vyāghāta; Solar: 25 Phālguna, 1947 SE; Lunisolar: Ṣaṣṭhī, Kṛishna pakṣa of Phālguna, 2082 VE; Rāudra・5126 KY・1,872,643
Icelandic	Mánudagur, 16 Góa 2025
Islamic	20 Ramadan, AH 1447 (using tabular method)
ISO week date	2026-W11-1
Japanese	21 Mutsuki, Reiwa 8 (Keichitsu, 11 days until Shunbun)
Julian	24 February, AD 2026 (AM 7534)
Julian day	2461109
Korean	21 Horangidal, 4359 DE
Maya	13.0.13.7.6; 4 Cumku, 7 Cimi
Roman	ante diem VI Kalendas Martias, MMDCCLXXIX AUC
Solar Hijri	18 Esfand, SH 1404
Tibetan	21 mchu, me pho rta 2153 or 1772 or 1000

<<	March					>>
Su	Mo	Tu	We	Th	Fr	Sa
1	2	3	4	5	6	7
8	9	10	11	12	13	14
15	16	17	18	19	20	21
22	23	24	25	26	27	28
29	30	31
2026

March 9 in recent years
2026 (Monday)
2025 (Sunday)
2024 (Saturday)
2023 (Thursday)
2022 (Wednesday)
2021 (Tuesday)
2020 (Monday)
2019 (Saturday)
2018 (Friday)
2017 (Thursday)

March 9 is the 68th day of the year (69th in leap years) in the Gregorian calendar; 297 days remain until the end of the year.

== Events ==
=== Pre-1600 ===
- 141 BC – Liu Che, posthumously known as Emperor Wu of Han, assumes the throne over the Han dynasty of China.
- 1009 – First known mention of Lithuania, in the annals of the monastery of Quedlinburg.
- 1044 – The people of Constantinople riot against emperor Constantine IX Monomachos, whose preference of his mistress Maria Skleraina over empress Zoe Porphyrogenita is seen as an insult.
- 1226 – Khwarazmian sultan Jalal ad-Din conquers the Georgian capital of Tbilisi.
- 1230 – Bulgarian Tsar Ivan Asen II defeats Theodore of Epirus in the Battle of Klokotnitsa.
- 1500 – The fleet of Pedro Álvares Cabral leaves Lisbon for the Indies. The fleet will discover Brazil which lies within boundaries granted to Portugal in the Treaty of Tordesillas in 1494.

=== 1601–1900 ===
- 1701 – Safavid troops retreat from Basra, ending a three-year occupation.
- 1765 – After a campaign by the writer Voltaire, judges in Paris posthumously exonerate Jean Calas of murdering his son. Calas had been tortured and executed in 1762 on the charge, though his son may have actually died by suicide.
- 1776 – Scottish philosopher Adam Smith publishes The Wealth of Nations, ushering in the classical period of political economy.
- 1796 – Napoléon Bonaparte marries his first wife, Joséphine de Beauharnais.
- 1811 – Paraguayan forces defeat Manuel Belgrano at the Battle of Tacuarí.
- 1815 – Francis Ronalds describes the first battery-operated clock in the Philosophical Magazine.
- 1841 – The U.S. Supreme Court rules in the United States v. The Amistad case that captive Africans who had seized control of the ship carrying them had been taken into slavery illegally.
- 1842 – Giuseppe Verdi's third opera, Nabucco, receives its première performance in Milan; its success establishes Verdi as one of Italy's foremost opera composers.
- 1842 – The first documented discovery of gold in California occurs at Rancho San Francisco, six years before the California Gold Rush.
- 1847 – Mexican–American War: The first large-scale amphibious assault in U.S. history is launched in the Siege of Veracruz.
- 1862 – American Civil War: USS Monitor and CSS Virginia (rebuilt from the engines and lower hull of the USS Merrimack) fight to a draw in the Battle of Hampton Roads, the first battle between two ironclad warships.
- 1883 – Demonstration of 9 March 1883: Parisian anarchists, unemployed and carpenters narrowly miss the Presidential palace during a violent protest; first use of the black flag as a symbol of anarchism by Louise Michel.

=== 1901–present ===
- 1908 – Inter Milan is founded on Football Club Internazionale, following a schism from A.C. Milan.
- 1916 – Mexican Revolution: Pancho Villa leads nearly 500 Mexican raiders in an attack against the border town of Columbus, New Mexico.
- 1933 – Great Depression: President Franklin D. Roosevelt submits the Emergency Banking Act to Congress, the first of his New Deal policies.
- 1942 – World War II: Dutch East Indies unconditionally surrenders to the Japanese forces in Kalijati, Subang, West Java, and the Japanese complete their Dutch East Indies campaign.
- 1944 – World War II: Soviet Army planes attack Tallinn, Estonia.
- 1945 – World War II: A coup d'état by Japanese forces in French Indochina removes the French from power.
- 1945 – World War II: Allied forces carry out firebombing over Tokyo, destroying most of the capital and killing over 100,000 civilians.
- 1946 – Bolton Wanderers stadium disaster at Burnden Park, Bolton, England, kills 33 and injures hundreds more.
- 1954 – McCarthyism: CBS television broadcasts the See It Now episode, "A Report on Senator Joseph McCarthy", produced by Fred Friendly.
- 1956 – Soviet forces suppress mass demonstrations in the Georgian SSR, reacting to Nikita Khrushchev's de-Stalinization policy.
- 1957 – The 8.6 M_{w} Andreanof Islands earthquake shakes the Aleutian Islands, causing over $5 million in damage from ground movement and a destructive tsunami.
- 1959 – The Barbie doll makes its debut at the American International Toy Fair in New York.
- 1960 – Dr. Belding Hibbard Scribner implants for the first time a shunt he invented into a patient, which allows the patient to receive hemodialysis on a regular basis.
- 1961 – Sputnik 9 successfully launches, carrying a dog and a human dummy, and demonstrating that the Soviet Union was ready to begin human spaceflight.
- 1967 – Trans World Airlines Flight 553 crashes in a field in Concord Township, Ohio, following a mid-air collision with a Beechcraft Baron, killing 26 people.
- 1974 – The Mars 7 Flyby bus releases the descent module too early, missing Mars.
- 1976 – Forty-two people die in the Cavalese cable car disaster, the deadliest cable car accident in history.
- 1977 – The Hanafi Siege: In a 39-hour standoff, armed Hanafi Muslims seize three Washington, D.C., buildings.
- 1978 – President Soeharto inaugurates Jagorawi Toll Road, the first toll highway in Indonesia, connecting Jakarta, Bogor and Ciawi, West Java.
- 1987 – Chrysler announces its acquisition of American Motors Corporation.
- 1997 – Comet Hale–Bopp: Observers in China, Mongolia and eastern Siberia are treated to a rare double feature as an eclipse permits Hale-Bopp to be seen during the day.
- 2000 – Nupedia, a multi-language online encyclopedia, is launched.
- 2011 – Space Shuttle Discovery makes its final landing after 39 flights.
- 2012 – A truce between the Salvadoran government and gangs in the country goes into effect when 30 gang leaders are transferred to lower security prisons.
- 2015 – Two Eurocopter AS350 Écureuil helicopters collide in mid-air over Villa Castelli, Argentina, killing all 10 people on board both aircraft, including French athletes Florence Arthaud, Camille Muffat and Alexis Vastine, as well as producers and guests for the French TV show Dropped.
- 2020 – Giuseppe Conte, Prime Minister of Italy, announces in a televised address and signs the decree imposing the first nationwide COVID-19 lockdown in the world.
- 2023 – A shooting in the Alsterdorf quarter of Hamburg, Germany, kills eight people and injures another eight.

== Births ==
=== Pre-1600 ===
- 1454 – Amerigo Vespucci, Italian cartographer and explorer, namesake of the Americas (died 1512)
- 1534 – Joseph of Anchieta, Spanish Jesuit saint and missionary (died 1597)
- 1564 – David Fabricius, German theologian, cartographer and astronomer (died 1617)
- 1568 – Aloysius Gonzaga, Italian saint, namesake of Gonzaga University (died 1591)

=== 1601–1900 ===
- 1611 – Pierre-Joseph-Marie Chaumonot, French-Canadian missionary (died 1693)
- 1662 – Franz Anton von Sporck, German noble (died 1738)
- 1697 – Friederike Caroline Neuber, German actress (died 1760)
- 1737 – Josef Mysliveček, Czech violinist and composer (died 1781)
- 1749 – Honoré Gabriel Riqueti, comte de Mirabeau, French journalist and politician (died 1791)
- 1753 – Jean-Baptiste Kléber, French general (died 1800)
- 1758 – Franz Joseph Gall, German neuroanatomist and physiologist (died 1828)
- 1763 – William Cobbett, English journalist and author (died 1835)
- 1806 – Edwin Forrest, American actor and philanthropist (died 1872)
- 1814 – Taras Shevchenko, Ukrainian poet and playwright (died 1861)
- 1815 – David Davis, American jurist and politician (died 1886)
- 1820 – Samuel Blatchford, American lawyer and jurist (died 1893)
- 1824 – Amasa Leland Stanford, American businessman and politician, founded Stanford University (died 1893)
- 1847 – Martin Pierre Marsick, Belgian violinist, composer, and educator (died 1924)
- 1850 – Hamo Thornycroft, English sculptor and academic (died 1925)
- 1856 – Eddie Foy, Sr., American actor and dancer (died 1928)
- 1863 – Mary Harris Armor, American suffragist (died 1950)
- 1887 – Fritz Lenz, German geneticist and physician, influential eugenicist within the Nazi party (died 1976)
- 1890 – Rupert Balfe, Australian footballer and lieutenant (died 1915)
- 1890 – Vyacheslav Molotov, Russian politician and diplomat, Soviet Minister of Foreign Affairs (died 1986)
- 1891 – José P. Laurel, Filipino lawyer, politician and President of the Philippines (died 1959)
- 1892 – Mátyás Rákosi, Hungarian politician (died 1971)
- 1892 – Vita Sackville-West, English author, poet, and gardener (died 1962)

=== 1901–present ===
- 1902 – Will Geer, American actor (died 1978)
- 1904 – Paul Wilbur Klipsch, American soldier and engineer, founded Klipsch Audio Technologies (died 2002)
- 1910 – Samuel Barber, American pianist and composer (died 1981)
- 1911 – Clara Rockmore, American classical violin prodigy and theremin player (died 1998)
- 1915 – Johnnie Johnson, English air marshal and pilot (died 2001)
- 1918 – George Lincoln Rockwell, American sailor and politician, founded the American Nazi Party (died 1967)
- 1918 – Mickey Spillane, American crime novelist (died 2006)
- 1920 – Franjo Mihalić, Croatian-Serbian runner and coach (died 2015)
- 1921 – Carl Betz, American actor (died 1978)
- 1922 – Ian Turbott, New Zealand-Australian former diplomat and university administrator (died 2016)
- 1923 – James L. Buckley, American lawyer, judge, and politician (died 2023)
- 1923 – André Courrèges, French fashion designer (died 2016)
- 1923 – Walter Kohn, Austrian-American physicist and academic, Nobel Prize laureate (died 2016)
- 1926 – Joe Franklin, American radio and television host (died 2015)
- 1927 – Jackie Jensen, American baseball player (died 1982)
- 1928 – Gerald Bull, Canadian-American engineer and academic (died 1990)
- 1928 – Keely Smith, American singer and actress (died 2017)
- 1929 – Desmond Hoyte, Guyanese lawyer, politician and President of Guyana (died 2002)
- 1929 – Zillur Rahman, Bangladeshi politician, 19th President of Bangladesh (died 2013)
- 1930 – Ornette Coleman, American saxophonist, violinist, trumpet player, and composer (died 2015)
- 1931 – Jackie Healy-Rae, Irish politician (died 2014)
- 1932 – Qayyum Chowdhury, Bangladeshi painter and academic (died 2014)
- 1932 – Walter Mercado, Puerto Rican astrologer and actor (died 2019)
- 1933 – Lloyd Price, American R&B singer-songwriter (died 2021)
- 1933 – David Weatherall, English physician, geneticist, and academic (died 2018)
- 1933 – Artt Frank, American jazz drummer and biographer (died 2024)
- 1934 – Yuri Gagarin, Russian colonel, pilot, and cosmonaut, first human in space (died 1968)
- 1934 – Joyce Van Patten, American actress
- 1935 – Andrew Viterbi, American engineer and businessman, co-founded Qualcomm Inc.
- 1936 – Mickey Gilley, American singer-songwriter and pianist (died 2022)
- 1936 – Marty Ingels, American actor and comedian (died 2015)
- 1937 – Bernard Landry, Canadian lawyer, politician and Premier of Quebec (died 2018)
- 1937 – Harry Neale, Canadian ice hockey player, coach, and sportscaster
- 1937 – Brian Redman, English race car driver
- 1939 – Malcolm Bricklin, American businessman, founded Bricklin and Yugo
- 1940 – Raul Julia, Puerto Rican actor (died 1994)
- 1941 – Jim Colbert, American golfer (died 2026)
- 1941 – Ernesto Miranda, American criminal (died 1976)
- 1941 – Trish Van Devere, American actress
- 1941 – Malcolm Smith, Canadian-American motorcycle racer (died 2024)
- 1942 – John Cale, Welsh musician, composer, singer, songwriter and record producer
- 1942 – Ion Caramitru, Romanian actor and artistic director (died 2021)
- 1942 – Mark Lindsay, American singer-songwriter, saxophonist, and producer
- 1943 – Bobby Fischer, American chess player and author (died 2008)
- 1943 – Charles Gibson, American journalist
- 1944 – Lee Irvine, South African cricketer
- 1945 – Robert Calvert, English singer-songwriter and playwright (died 1988)
- 1945 – Dennis Rader, American serial killer
- 1945 – Robin Trower, English guitarist and vocalist
- 1946 – Alexandra Bastedo, English actress (died 2014)
- 1946 – Bernd Hölzenbein, German footballer and scout (died 2024)
- 1946 – Warren Skaaren, American screenwriter and producer (died 1990)
- 1947 – Keri Hulme, New Zealand author and poet (died 2021)
- 1948 – Emma Bonino, Italian politician, Italian Minister of Foreign Affairs
- 1948 – Eric Fischl, American painter and sculptor
- 1948 – Jeffrey Osborne, American singer and drummer
- 1949 – Neil Hamilton, Welsh lawyer and politician
- 1949 – Tapani Kansa, Finnish singer (died 2025)
- 1950 – Doug Ault, American baseball player and manager (died 2004)
- 1950 – Andy North, American golfer
- 1950 – Howard Shelley, English pianist and conductor
- 1951 – Helen Zille, South African journalist, politician and Premier of the Western Cape
- 1952 – Bill Beaumont, English rugby player and manager
- 1954 – Carlos Ghosn, Brazilian-Lebanese-French business executive
- 1954 – Bobby Sands, PIRA volunteer, Irish republican, politician, died on hunger strike (died 1981)
- 1954 – Jock Taylor, Scottish motorcycle racer (died 1982)
- 1955 – Teo Fabi, Italian race car driver
- 1955 – Józef Pinior, Polish academic and politician
- 1956 – Mark Dantonio, American football player and coach
- 1956 – Shashi Tharoor, Indian politician, Indian Minister of External Affairs
- 1956 – David Willetts, English academic and politician
- 1958 – Linda Fiorentino, American actress
- 1958 – Paul MacLean, Canadian ice hockey player and coach
- 1959 – Tom Amandes, American actor
- 1959 – Takaaki Kajita, Japanese physicist and academic, Nobel Prize laureate
- 1959 – Lonny Price, American actor, director, and screenwriter
- 1960 – Finn Carter, American actress
- 1960 – Željko Obradović, Serbian basketball player and coach
- 1961 – Rick Steiner, American wrestler
- 1961 – Darrell Walker, American basketball player and coach
- 1962 – Jan Furtok, Polish football player and manager (died 2024)
- 1963 – Ivan Henjak, Croatian-Australian rugby league player and coach
- 1963 – Terry Mulholland, American baseball player
- 1963 – Jean-Marc Vallée, Canadian director and screenwriter (died 2021)
- 1964 – Juliette Binoche, French actress
- 1964 – Phil Housley, American ice hockey player and coach
- 1965 – Brian Bosworth, American football player and actor
- 1965 – Benito Santiago, Puerto Rican baseball player
- 1966 – Brendan Canty, American drummer and songwriter
- 1966 – Tony Lockett, Australian footballer
- 1968 – Youri Djorkaeff, French footballer
- 1969 – Mahmoud Abdul-Rauf, American basketball player
- 1969 – Kimberly Guilfoyle, American lawyer and journalist
- 1970 – Naveen Jindal, Indian businessman and politician
- 1970 – Martin Johnson, English rugby player and coach
- 1970 – Shannon Leto, American musician and songwriter
- 1971 – Emmanuel Lewis, American actor
- 1972 – Jodey Arrington, American politician
- 1972 – Jean Louisa Kelly, American actress and singer
- 1972 – Kerr Smith, American actor
- 1973 – Aaron Boone, American baseball player and manager
- 1973 – Liam Griffin, English race car driver
- 1974 – Mark Harrity, Australian cricketer
- 1975 – Adonal Foyle, Vincentian-American basketball player
- 1975 – Juan Sebastián Verón, Argentine footballer
- 1977 – Radek Dvořák, Czech ice hockey player
- 1977 – Mark Tookey, Australian rugby league player
- 1978 – Chris Phillips, Canadian ice hockey player and businessman
- 1979 – Oscar Isaac, Guatemalan-American actor
- 1979 – Jordan Klepper, American comedian
- 1980 – Matt Barnes, American basketball player
- 1980 – Chingy, American rapper
- 1980 – Matthew Gray Gubler, American actor
- 1981 – Antonio Bryant, American football player
- 1981 – Chad Gilbert, American musician, songwriter, and producer (died 2026)
- 1981 – Clay Rapada, American baseball player
- 1982 – Ryan Bayley, Australian cyclist
- 1982 – Érika de Souza, Brazilian basketball player
- 1982 – Mirjana Lučić-Baroni, Croatian tennis player
- 1983 – Clint Dempsey, American soccer player
- 1983 – Wayne Simien, American basketball player
- 1984 – Abdoulay Konko, French footballer
- 1984 – Julia Mancuso, American skier
- 1985 – Brent Burns, Canadian ice hockey player
- 1985 – Jesse Litsch, American baseball player
- 1985 – Pastor Maldonado, Venezuelan race car driver
- 1985 – Parthiv Patel, Indian cricketer
- 1986 – Bryan Bickell, Canadian ice hockey player
- 1986 – Damien Brunner, Swiss ice hockey player
- 1986 – Colin Greening, Canadian ice hockey player
- 1986 – Brittany Snow, American actress and producer
- 1987 – Daniel Hudson, American baseball player
- 1987 – Bow Wow, American rapper and actor
- 1989 – Taeyeon, South Korean singer
- 1990 – Daley Blind, Dutch footballer
- 1990 – YG, American rapper
- 1991 – Jooyoung, South Korean singer-songwriter
- 1993 – George Baldock, Greek footballer (died 2024)
- 1993 – Miikka Salomäki, Finnish ice hockey player
- 1993 – Suga, South Korean rapper, songwriter and record producer
- 1994 – Morgan Rielly, Canadian ice hockey player
- 1995 – Cierra Ramirez, American actress and singer
- 1997 – Nadeo Argawinata, Indonesian footballer
- 1997 – Chika, American rapper
- 1998 – Najee Harris, American football running back
- 1999 – Ukko-Pekka Luukkonen, Finnish ice hockey player
- 2000 – Khaby Lame, Senegalese-Italian social media personality
- 2001 – Jeon Somi, South Korean-Canadian singer
- 2002 – Usman Garuba, Spanish basketball player
- 2003 – Sunisa Lee, American gymnast

== Deaths ==
=== Pre-1600 ===
- 886 – Abu Ma'shar al-Balkhi, Muslim scholar and astrologer (born 787)
- 1202 – Sverre of Norway, King of Norway and founder of the House of Sverre
- 1440 – Frances of Rome, Italian nun and saint (born 1384)
- 1444 – Leonardo Bruni, Italian humanist (born c. 1370)
- 1463 – Catherine of Bologna, Italian nun and saint (born 1463)
- 1566 – David Rizzio, Italian-Scottish courtier and politician (born 1533)

=== 1601–1900 ===
- 1649 – James Hamilton, 1st Duke of Hamilton, Scottish soldier and politician (born 1606)
- 1649 – Henry Rich, 1st Earl of Holland, English soldier and politician (born 1590)
- 1661 – Cardinal Mazarin, Italian-French academic and politician, Prime Minister of France (born 1602)
- 1703 – Alexander Chalmers Polish-Scottish merchant, jurist, and politician, mayor of Old Warsaw (b. 1645)
- 1709 – Ralph Montagu, 1st Duke of Montagu, English courtier and politician (born 1638)
- 1808 – Joseph Bonomi the Elder, Italian architect (born 1739)
- 1810 – Ozias Humphry, English painter and academic (born 1742)
- 1825 – Anna Laetitia Barbauld, English poet, author, and critic (born 1743)
- 1831 – Friedrich Maximilian von Klinger, German author and playwright (born 1752)
- 1847 – Mary Anning, English paleontologist (born 1799)
- 1851 – Hans Christian Ørsted, Danish physicist and chemist, discovered electromagnetism and the element aluminium (born 1777)
- 1876 – Louise Colet, French poet (born 1810)
- 1888 – William I, German Emperor (born 1797)
- 1895 – Leopold von Sacher-Masoch, Austrian journalist and author (born 1836)
- 1897 – Sondre Norheim, Norwegian-American skier (born 1825)

=== 1901–present ===
- 1918 – Frank Wedekind, German author and playwright (born 1864)
- 1925 – Willard Metcalf, American painter and academic (born 1858)
- 1926 – Mikao Usui, Japanese spiritual leader, founded Reiki (born 1865)
- 1937 – Paul Elmer More, American journalist and critic (born 1864)
- 1943 – Otto Freundlich, German painter and sculptor (born 1878)
- 1954 – Vagn Walfrid Ekman, Swedish oceanographer and academic (born 1874)
- 1955 – Miroslava Stern (Miroslava), Czech-Mexican actress (born 1925)
- 1964 – Paul von Lettow-Vorbeck, German general (born 1870)
- 1969 – Abdul Munim Riad, Egyptian general (born 1919)
- 1971 – Pope Cyril VI of Alexandria, Coptic Orthodox Pope (born 1902)
- 1974 – Earl Wilbur Sutherland, Jr., American pharmacologist and biochemist, Nobel Prize laureate (born 1915)
- 1974 – Harry Womack, American singer (born 1945)
- 1983 – Faye Emerson, American actress (born 1917)
- 1983 – Ulf von Euler, Swedish physiologist and pharmacologist, Nobel Prize laureate (born 1905)
- 1988 – Kurt Georg Kiesinger, German lawyer, politician and Chancellor of Germany (born 1904)
- 1989 – Robert Mapplethorpe, American photographer (born 1946)
- 1991 – Jim Hardin, American baseball player (born 1943)
- 1992 – Menachem Begin, Belarusian-Israeli soldier, politician and Prime Minister of Israel, Nobel Prize laureate (born 1913)
- 1993 – C. Northcote Parkinson, English historian and author (born 1909)
- 1994 – Charles Bukowski, American poet, novelist, and short story writer (born 1920)
- 1994 – Eddie Creatchman, Canadian wrestler, referee, and manager (born 1928)
- 1994 – Fernando Rey, Spanish actor (born 1917)
- 1995 – Edward Bernays, Austrian-American propagandist (born 1891)
- 1996 – George Burns, American comedian, actor, and writer (born 1896)
- 1997 – Jean-Dominique Bauby, French journalist and author (born 1952)
- 1997 – Terry Nation, Welsh author and screenwriter (born 1930)
- 1997 – The Notorious B.I.G., American rapper, songwriter, and actor (born 1972)
- 1999 – Harry Somers, Canadian pianist and composer (born 1925)
- 1999 – George Singh, Belizean jurist and Chief Justice of Belize (born 1937)
- 2000 – Jean Coulthard, Canadian composer and educator (born 1908)
- 2003 – Stan Brakhage, American director and cinematographer (born 1933)
- 2003 – Bernard Dowiyogo, Nauruan politician, President of Nauru (born 1946)
- 2004 – John Mayer, Indian composer (born 1930)
- 2006 – Tom Fox, American activist (born 1951)
- 2006 – Anna Moffo, American soprano (born 1932)
- 2006 – John Profumo, English soldier and politician, Secretary of State for War (born 1915)
- 2007 – Brad Delp, American singer-songwriter and guitarist (born 1951)
- 2007 – Glen Harmon, Canadian ice hockey player (born 1921)
- 2010 – Willie Davis, American baseball player and manager (born 1940)
- 2010 – Doris Haddock, American activist and politician (born 1910)
- 2010 – Wilfy Rebimbus, Indian singer (born 1942)
- 2010 – Henry Wittenberg, American wrestler (born 1918)
- 2011 – David S. Broder, American journalist and academic (born 1929)
- 2013 – Max Jakobson, Finnish journalist and diplomat (born 1923)
- 2013 – Merton Simpson, American painter and art collector (born 1928)
- 2015 – James Molyneaux, Baron Molyneaux of Killead, Northern Irish soldier and politician (born 1920)
- 2016 – Robert Horton, American actor (born 1924)
- 2016 – Clyde Lovellette, American basketball player and coach (born 1929)
- 2017 – Howard Hodgkin, British painter (born 1932)
- 2018 – Jo Min-ki, Korean actor (born 1965)
- 2020 – John Bathersby, Australian Catholic bishop (born 1936)
- 2021 – James Levine, American conductor and pianist (born 1943)
- 2021 – Roger Mudd, American journalist (born 1928)
- 2023 – Chaim Topol, Israeli actor (born 1935)

== Holidays and observances ==
- Christian feast day:
  - Catherine of Bologna
  - Forty Martyrs of Sebaste
  - Frances of Rome
  - Pacian
  - Pope Cyril VI of Alexandria (Coptic Orthodox Church)
  - Gregory of Nyssa (Episcopal Church (United States))
  - March 9 (Eastern Orthodox liturgics)
- Teachers' Day or Eid Al Moalim (Lebanon)

== Sources ==
- Matthee, Rudi (2006b). "Iraq iv. Relations in the Safavid period". Encyclopaedia Iranica (Vol. XIII, Fasc. 5 and Vol. XIII, Fasc. 6). New York: Encyclopedia Iranica Foundation. pp. 556–561.
