= Adventure Line Productions =

French television production company

- Formerly: Télé Union Paris; Télé-Union Productions; Tilt Productions (until 1998); Anabase Productions (1998–2002)
- Type: Subsidiary
- Industry: Television production
- Founded: 1972; 54 years ago
- Founder: Jacques Antoine
- Headquarters: Paris, France
- Key people: Alexia Laroche-Joubert (Managing Director)
- Parent: JAC (1991–1994); Studio Expand (1995–2003); JAP SA (2004–2005); Marathon Group (2006–2010); Zodiak Media (2010–2016); Banijay Entertainment (2016–present)
- Subsidiaries: ALP Music
- Website: https://www.alp.tv/

Adventure Line Productions (formerly Tilt Productions until 1998 and Anabase Productions), part of Banijay Entertainment, is a French television production company which specialises in creating adventure gameshows (over 1,500 episodes of Fort Boyard) and adapting international formats for French television channels such as Survivor (also known as Koh-Lanta).

Adventure Line Productions has licensed many of its formats to broadcasters around the world including BBC, TV4, RTR and LBCI.

== History ==
From 1991 to 1994, the company was part of the “Jacques Antoine et Compagnie” group (JAC) created by the famous game show producer Jacques Antoine. Between 1995 and 2003, it belonged to the Studio Expand group.

They designed programs such as Fort Boyard in 1990 for Antenne 2 and La Carte aux trésors in 1996 for France 3. The predecessor of La Carte aux trésors is La Chasse aux trésors, the French version of Treasure Hunt.

Thereafter, from February 2006 to 2010, the group Marathon Media, known for animated television series such as Totally Spies! and Marsupilami, which recovers ALP. Between 2010 and 2016, the company belonged to Zodiak Media, the third independent audiovisual group in the world. Zodiak Media would later merge with Banijay Group in February 2016.

== Controversies and court cases ==
On March 22, 2013, Gerald Babin, a candidate in season 13 of Koh-Lanta in Cambodia, died of a heart attack on the set of the adventure show. A few days later the doctor of the program, Thierry Costa, committed suicide. The season being filmed was then cancelled. ALP was criticized for its failure to take care of the evacuation of the victim. In 2014, ALP reached an agreement with the family of the candidate that included a large compensation. This is the first case of death in a French reality show.

On March 10, 2015, a new tragedy tarnished ALP's image: during the filming of a new adventure game for TF1 called Dropped, the collision of two helicopters in Villa Castelli, Argentina, cost the lives of ten people, including top athletes Florence Arthaud, Camille Muffat and Alexis Vastine. The lack of preparation, the lack of training of the pilots of the two helicopters in formation flying and in-flight image capture, as well as the status of the operator of the aircraft are blamed by the investigation of the Junta de Investigación de Accidentes de Aviación Civil. These shortcomings were firmly denied by the production company, explaining that an effective briefing and preparation of the pilots for this formation flight had been carried out. But, on April 25, 2018, the ALP company was condemned in this case for "inexcusable fault" by a court in Hauts-de-Seine.

On May 11, 2018, after only four days of filming, the production makes the decision to interrupt the filming of the new season of Koh-Lanta. In a statement, the production confirms rumors in the French press, indicating that an attempted sexual assault by a candidate on a candidate is the cause.

In March 2021, the ALP company is indicted for manslaughter after the accident that took place on March 10, 2015, in Argentina. A verdict based on the findings of the investigation implicating the production company for shortcomings in the planning of the flight, the use in a commercial setting of public helicopters or carelessness in piloting for spectacular sequences. The investigation also reveals that ALP underestimated the safety budget by prioritizing its financial interests in the choice of pilots and helicopters.

On May 27, 2021, the production company ALP was ordered on appeal "for inexcusable fault" to compensate the family of a cameraman victim of the helicopter accident that occurred on the set of Dropped (TF1), in March 2015 in Argentina, by the Court of Appeal of Versailles.

== Productions ==
=== Original formats ===
- Fort Boyard
- The Desert Forges
- Treasure Hunt
- The Crystal Maze
- Race Around the World

=== Adapted formats for French television ===
- Popstars
- Survivor (a.k.a. Koh-Lanta)
- How to Look Good Naked (a.k.a. Belle toute nue)
- Kids Top 20 (a.k.a. Kids 20)
- Dropped (series cancelled following Villa Castelli helicopter collision)
