= Sylvain Wiltord =

French footballer (born 1974)

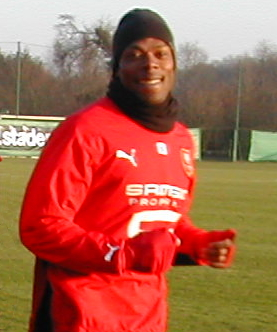
- Wiltord training with Rennes in 2008

Personal information
- Full name: Sylvain Claude Wiltord
- Date of birth: 10 May 1974 (age 52)
- Place of birth: Neuilly-sur-Marne, Seine-Saint-Denis, France
- Height: 1.73 m (5 ft 8 in)
- Position: Right winger

Youth career
- –1988: Neuilly-sur-Marne
- 1988–1991: Joinville-le-Pont
- 1991–1993: Rennes

Senior career*
Years	Team	Apps	(Gls)
1991–1996	Rennes	91	(28)
1996–1997	Deportivo La Coruña	0	(0)
1996–1997	→ Rennes (loan)	35	(3)
1997–2000	Bordeaux	99	(46)
2000–2004	Arsenal	106	(31)
2004–2007	Lyon	82	(20)
2007–2009	Rennes	31	(6)
2009	Marseille	13	(1)
2010	Metz	15	(3)
2011–2012	Nantes	33	(8)
Total		505	(146)

International career
1999–2006	France	92	(26)
Medal record
Men's football
Representing France
UEFA European Championship
Winner	2000
FIFA Confederations Cup
Winner	2001
Winner	2003
FIFA World Cup
Runner-up	2006
- * Club domestic league appearances and goals

Sylvain Claude Wiltord ([sil.vɛ̃ vil.tɔʁ]; born 10 May 1974) is a French former professional footballer. Mainly a right winger, he also played as a centre-forward, second striker and on the left wing.

Wiltord had a four-season spell at Arsenal, with whom he won two Premier League titles and two FA Cups. He also won the Ligue 1 title at Bordeaux and in each of his three consecutive seasons at Lyon.

With the France national team, Wiltord earned 92 caps and scored 26 goals. He played at the 1996 Olympics, two FIFA World Cups and two UEFA European Championships. Wiltord was part of the teams which won Euro 2000 (for which he scored a last minute equaliser to take the final to extra time) and reached the final of the 2006 World Cup.

== Early and personal life ==
Sylvain Claude Wiltord was born on 10 May 1974 in Neuilly-sur-Marne, a commune in the eastern suburbs of Paris in the department of Seine-Saint-Denis, to a mother from the West Indies and a father he did not know. He was one of eight children. At the age of 14, he went to live at his 27-year-old sister's apartment where he cared for his two-year-old niece.

In 2015, Wiltord competed on the TF1 reality show Dropped, in which sportspeople were dropped by helicopter into inhospitable environments. The day after his elimination from the programme, there was a mid-air helicopter collision which killed ten, including three contestants: swimmer Camille Muffat, boxer Alexis Vastine, and sailor Florence Arthaud. He wrote on Twitter after the crash, "I'm sad for my friends, I'm trembling, I'm horrified, I have no words, I don't want to say anything."

== Club career ==
=== Early career, Rennes and Bordeaux ===
Wiltord joined Rennes from lower-league side CO Joinville in 1991. At Rennes, he emerged in the 1993–94 season with eight goals in 26 games.

In summer 1996, after Wiltord excelled for France at the 1996 Summer Olympics Spanish La Liga club Deportivo de La Coruña reached an agreement with Rennes for him to join from 1 July 1997. As part of the agreement a transfer fee of 300 million pesetas (€1.8 million) was paid to Rennes while Wiltord was loaned back to Rennes for the 1996–97 season. In the summer of 1997, at the end of his spell on loan, he returned to Spain only to request a move back to France so as to link up with Bordeaux. For this transfer a fee of 375 million pesetas (€2.25 million) and a 40% sell-on clause were agreed.

He was ever-present in his first term at Bordeaux and went on to score 22 goals in the following 1998–99 season, where he won the golden boot as Bordeaux lifted the Ligue 1 championship.

=== Arsenal ===
Wiltord was signed by English club Arsenal, for what was then a club record fee of £13 million in August 2000, weeks after scoring the stoppage-time equaliser in the Euro 2000 Final. This record fee was not surpassed until eight and a half years later when Arsenal paid £15 million for Russian winger Andrey Arshavin. Whilst with the Gunners he was occasionally paired with Thierry Henry up front or otherwise upon the wing. Wiltord made his debut as a substitute against Chelsea on 6 September 2000, and his first goal followed against Coventry City on 16 September 2000. A highlight in his first season was scoring a first half hat-trick in a win against West Ham United. Arsenal reached the 2001 FA Cup Final which Wiltord started. He was substituted for Ray Parlour with Arsenal leading 1–0, however Liverpool ultimately came back and scored two late goals to win 2–1.

In the 2001–02 season Wiltord scored ten goals in the league as Arsenal finished as champions. He scored crucial winning goals along the way against Chelsea and Everton. The highlight of Wiltord's Arsenal career came at the end of that season; scoring the winning goal over Manchester United at Old Trafford, a 1–0 win which clinched the 2001–02 Premier League title as Arsenal achieved The Double on 8 May. Returning to Old Trafford the following season in the FA Cup, Wiltord netted again as Arsenal saw off United 2–0 in a year where they also won the Cup. Wiltord started the 2002 FA Cup Final and played as a substitute in the 2003 final.

Wiltord went on to form part of Arsenal's 2003–04 "Invincibles" season, though his appearances were less frequent towards the end of the campaign. During the season he made a total of 12 league appearances, which was enough to earn a title winners' medal. Altogether he played 175 times for the Gunners in all competitions, scoring a total of 49 goals.

In June 2008, Wiltord was voted 33rd in a list of 50 of the greatest Arsenal players of all time.

=== Lyon ===
When his contract with Arsenal expired in the summer of 2004, Wiltord trained for two weeks with Rennes and rejected a move to newly promoted Premier League team West Bromwich Albion. He was also reportedly keen on a move to Arsenal's rivals Tottenham Hotspur. On 31 August, he signed for Lyon on an initial two-year contract. Moving to Lyon, Wiltord found further success, winning three Ligue 1 titles and reaching the quarter-finals of the UEFA Champions League in successive seasons.

=== Rennes ===
Wiltord signed for Rennes in August 2007 on a two-year contract and with an opportunity to join the coaching staff when he finished his professional career.

=== Marseille ===
He joined Marseille on 15 January 2009 for the remainder of the Ligue 1 season. On 17 May 2009, he scored Marseille's only goal in a 3–1 loss to Lyon at home. He was released at the end of the 2008–09 season, and was considering a possible move to either America, UAE or perhaps retirement.

=== Metz ===
On 30 January 2010, after training with Créteil, Wiltord signed with Metz until the end of the season.

=== Nantes ===
On 18 July 2011, Wiltord came back from retirement and signed a contract at Nantes until the end of 2011–12. He announced his immediate retirement on 11 June 2012.

== International career ==
Wiltord made his debut for the France national team in a 2–0 victory over England on 10 February 1999 at Wembley Stadium. For France, he was capped 92 times, scoring 26 goals. His most memorable goal for Les Bleus was scored in dramatic fashion in the last seconds of the UEFA Euro 2000 Final against Italy to tie the match 1–1 and bring the game to extra-time. France then won the final from a golden goal scored by David Trezeguet.

Wiltord remained in the national squad for the 2002 World Cup, where France endured a shocking first round exit without a single win or scoring a single goal, the worst ever performance by a defending champion at the World Cup.

Wiltord also took part at UEFA Euro 2004 in Portugal, having played seven games in the qualifying campaign with a return of six goals. However, a poor performance from Les Bleus saw a shocking quarter-final exit at the hands of eventual surprise winners Greece.

Wiltord also was a part of Raymond Domenech's France squad that played in the 2006 FIFA World Cup final against arch-rivals Italy. Wiltord scored France's first penalty in the ensuing penalty shootout following the 1–1 draw, but France lost the shootout 5–3.

Wiltord is France's 12th highest scorer with 26 goals netted for Les Bleus.

== Media ==
Wiltord was sponsored by sportswear company Nike and appeared in Nike commercials. In a global Nike advertising campaign in the run-up to the 2002 World Cup in Korea and Japan, he starred in a "Secret Tournament" commercial (branded "Scopion KO") directed by Terry Gilliam, appearing alongside football players such as Thierry Henry, Ronaldo, Edgar Davids, Fabio Cannavaro, Francesco Totti, Ronaldinho, Luís Figo and Hidetoshi Nakata, with former player Eric Cantona the tournament "referee".

== Career statistics ==
=== Club ===
Appearances and goals by club, season and competition
Club	Season	League			National cup (Note: Includes Coupe de France, FA Cup)		League cup (Note: Includes Coupe de la Ligue, Football League Cup)		Europe		Other		Total	
Club	Season	Division	Apps	Goals	Apps	Goals	Apps	Goals	Apps	Goals	Apps	Goals	Apps	Goals
Rennes	1992–93	Division 2	2	0	0	0	–		–		–		2	0
Rennes	1993–94	Division 2	26	8	1	0	–		–		–		27	8
Rennes	1994–95	Division 1	26	5	1	0	0	0	–		–		27	5
Rennes	1995–96	Division 1	37	15	1	0	2	3	–		–		40	18
Rennes	Total		91	28	3	0	2	3	–		–		96	31
Rennes (loan)	1996–97	Division 1	35	3	2	0	3	0	–		–		40	3
Bordeaux	1997–98	Division 1	34	11	2	4	5	1	2 (Note: Appearances in UEFA Cup)	0	–		43	16
Bordeaux	1998–99	Division 1	33	22	0	0	1	0	8	5	–		42	27
Bordeaux	1999–2000	Division 1	32	13	4	0	2	0	12 (Note: Appearances in UEFA Champions League)	4	1 (Note: Appearance in Trophee des Champions)	0	51	17
Bordeaux	Total		99	46	6	4	8	1	22	9	1	0	136	60
Arsenal	2000–01	Premier League	27	8	6	6	1	0	13	1	–		47	15
Arsenal	2001–02	Premier League	33	10	7	2	3	4	11	1	–		54	17
Arsenal	2002–03	Premier League	34	10	7	2	0	0	12	1	1 (Note: Appearance in FA Community Shield)	0	54	13
Arsenal	2003–04	Premier League	12	3	0	0	3	1	4	0	1	0	20	4
Arsenal	Total		106	31	20	10	7	5	40	3	2	0	175	49
Lyon	2004–05	Ligue 1	25	3	2	2	0	0	8	6	–		35	11
Lyon	2005–06	Ligue 1	35	12	3	0	0	0	10	2	–		48	14
Lyon	2006–07	Ligue 1	22	5	1	0	2	2	6	0	–		31	7
Lyon	Total		82	20	6	2	2	2	24	8	–		114	32
Rennes	2007–08	Ligue 1	25	6	2	1	1	0	4	0	–		32	7
Rennes	2008–09	Ligue 1	6	0	0	0	1	1	2	0	–		9	1
Rennes	Total		31	6	2	1	2	1	6	0	–		41	8
Marseille	2008–09	Ligue 1	13	1	1	0	0	0	0	0	–		14	1
Metz	2009–10	Ligue 2	15	3	0	0	0	0	0	0	–		15	3
Nantes	2011–12	Ligue 2	33	8	0	0	1	0	0	0	–		34	8
Career total			505	146	40	17	25	12	92	20	3	0	665	195

=== International ===
Appearances and goals by national team and year
National team	Year	Apps	Goals
France
France	1999	8	2
France	2000	14	6
France	2001	13	4
France	2002	11	3
France	2003	13	5
France	2004	8	3
France	2005	9	1
France	2006	16	2
Total		92	26

Scores and results list France's goal tally first, score column indicates score after each Wiltord goal.

List of international goals scored by Sylvain Wiltord
No.	Date	Venue	Opponent	Score	Result	Competition
1	31 March 1999	Stade de France, Saint-Denis, France	Armenia	1–0	2–0	UEFA Euro 2000 qualifying
2	5 June 1999	Stade de France, Saint-Denis, France	Russia	2–1	2–3	UEFA Euro 2000 qualifying
3	29 March 2000	Hampden Park, Glasgow, Scotland	Scotland	1–0	2–0	Friendly
4	6 June 2000	Stade Mohamed V, Casablanca, Morocco	Morocco	5–1	5–1	2000 King Hassan II International Cup Tournament
5	11 June 2000	Jan Breydel Stadium, Bruges, Belgium	Denmark	3–0	3–0	UEFA Euro 2000
6	2 July 2000	Feijenoord Stadion, Rotterdam, Netherlands	Italy	1–1	2–1	UEFA Euro 2000
7	4 October 2000	Stade de France, Saint-Denis, France	Cameroon	1–0	1–1	Friendly
8	15 November 2000	BJK İnönü Stadium, Istanbul, Turkey	Turkey	2–0	4–0	Friendly
9	24 March 2001	Stade de France, Saint-Denis, France	Japan	3–0	5–0	Friendly
10	25 April 2001	Stade de France, Saint-Denis, France	Portugal	1–0	4–0	Friendly
11	30 May 2001	Daegu World Cup Stadium, Daegu, South Korea	South Korea	5–0	5–0	2001 FIFA Confederations Cup
12	3 June 2001	Munsu Cup Stadium, Ulsan, South Korea	Mexico	1–0	4–0	2001 FIFA Confederations Cup
13	7 September 2002	GSP Stadium, Nicosia, Cyprus	Cyprus	2–1	2–1	UEFA Euro 2004 qualifying
14	12 October 2002	Stade de France, Saint-Denis, France	Slovenia	4–0	5–0	UEFA Euro 2004 qualifying
15	16 October 2002	Ta' Qali Stadium, Ta' Qali, Malta	Malta	3–0	4–0	UEFA Euro 2004 qualifying
16	29 March 2003	Stade Félix-Bollaert, Lens, France	Malta	1–0	6–0	UEFA Euro 2004 qualifying
17	26 June 2003	Stade de France, Saint-Denis, France	Turkey	3–1	3–2	2003 FIFA Confederations Cup
18	20 August 2003	Stade de Genève, Genève, Switzerland	Switzerland	1–0	2–0	Friendly
19	6 September 2003	Stade de France, Saint-Denis, France	Cyprus	2–0	5–0	UEFA Euro 2004 qualifying
20	6 September 2003	Stade de France, Saint-Denis, France	Cyprus	3–0	5–0	UEFA Euro 2004 qualifying
21	28 May 2004	Stade de la Mosson, Montpellier, France	Andorra	1–0	4–0	Friendly
22	28 May 2004	Stade de la Mosson, Montpellier, France	Andorra	2–0	4–0	Friendly
23	13 October 2004	GSP Stadium, Nicosia, Cyprus	Cyprus	1–0	2–0	2006 FIFA World Cup qualification
24	12 October 2005	Stade de France, Saint-Denis, France	Cyprus	2–0	4–0	2006 FIFA World Cup qualification
25	1 March 2006	Stade de France, Saint-Denis, France	Slovakia	1–1	1–2	Friendly
26	31 May 2006	Stade Félix-Bollaert, Lens, France	Denmark	2–0	2–0	Friendly

== Honours ==
Bordeaux

- Division 1: 1998–99

Arsenal

- Premier League: 2001–02, 2003–04
- FA Cup: 2001–02, 2002–03; runner-up: 2000–01
- FA Community Shield: 2002

Lyon

- Ligue 1: 2004–05, 2005–06, 2006–07

France

- UEFA European Championship: 2000
- FIFA Confederations Cup: 2001, 2003
- FIFA World Cup runner-up: 2006

Individual

- French Footballer of the Year: 1999
- Ballon d'Or nominee: 2002, 2003
- Premier League Player of the Month: August 2002
- UNFP Ligue 1 Team of the Year: 2004–05, 2005–06
