= Dropped (TV series) =

- Genre: Reality television
- Presented by: Louis Bodin
- Country of origin: France
- Original language: French

Production
- Production company: Adventure Line Productions

Original release
- Network: TF1

Dropped was a French survival reality television series that was scheduled to air on TF1 in 2015. Based on the Swedish television series Det största äventyret (The Greatest Adventure), the premise of the programme is to drop celebrities into a hostile environment and leave them to fend for themselves. Filming began in February 2015, but was halted in early March following a helicopter crash that claimed the lives of ten people, including three of the contestants and five of the production crew.

== History ==
Produced by Adventure Line Productions (ALP), and developed from the Swedish reality show Det största äventyret (The Great Adventure), the format of Dropped involves blindfolding several sports personalities, then dropping them at a remote location where they must use their survival skills to find their way back to civilisation. Contestants are split into two teams, which must then compete against each other, and have 72 hours to reach a location where they can charge and use a mobile phone. A promotional video explains the show's premise as: "Two teams are dropped into the middle of nowhere. No food. No map. No help."

Filming of the series began in late February in Ushuaia, a city in the far southern Patagonia region of Argentina. The cast included seven French athletes—Florence Arthaud, Alain Bernard, Philippe Candeloro, Jeannie Longo, Camille Muffat, Alexis Vastine, Sylvain Wiltord—and Swiss athlete Anne-Flore Marxer. By Monday 9 March, the show had moved to the province of La Rioja, and filming of the first episode was complete, with Wiltord having been eliminated from the process, and returned home to Paris.

=== Helicopter crash ===
At around 5.00 p.m. local time on 9 March 2015, shortly after taking off near the town of Villa Castelli, two helicopters carrying some of the contestants and film crew were involved in a mid-air collision and subsequent crash, leaving ten people dead with no survivors. Within 24 hours, the French Presidential Office had confirmed and published the names of the deceased, which included Arthaud, Muffat, Vastine, the two helicopter pilots, and five members of the film crew.

In the wake of the incident, TF1 halted filming on the series, and announced that the show had been postponed. The series had been scheduled to air as part of the channel's summer 2015 lineup, but speaking subsequently to TF1, the CEO of Adventure Line Productions, Franck Firmin-Guion, said that footage of the show would "not see the light of day" following the incident. ALP's website also removed the show from its list of productions.

On 10 March, French prosecutors opened a manslaughter investigation, a standard procedure when the death of a French citizen occurs overseas. Officials in Argentina also launched an investigation into the incident, led by Judge Daniel Herrera. After questioning the surviving contestants and production staff as part of his inquiry, Herrera gave them the go ahead to return home on 12 March. Bernard, Candeloro, Longo, Marxer and the remaining film crew boarded a flight from Buenos Aires on 13 March, returning to Paris the following day. They were greeted by friends and relatives, as well as the CEO of TF1, before leaving the airport separately. Forensic experts from France and Argentina announced they had officially identified the bodies of the deceased on 16 March.

The incident—the latest of a series of deaths to have occurred on film sets and reality shows—was the second fatality involving an ALP production after a contestant died of a heart attack following a challenge on the survival show Koh-Lanta in 2013, and consequently reignited an ongoing debate about the safety of reality television shows. Speaking to the Los Angeles Times, Professor Laurie Levenson of Loyola Law School suggested the accident demonstrates the dangers of the genre: "These reality shows try to outdo each other. They keep trying to push the envelope: The more dangerous the better. They do it for the entertainment value ... at some point you have to say: Is this craziness or is this entertainment?" A report by Time magazine's Vivienne Walt suggested a culture of low budget television prepared to take increasingly greater risks with its productions for dramatic effect may have resulted in this tragedy, and others. Musician Benjamin Biolay described the format as a "horrible TV reality show that serves up cardboard stars and then steals three wonderful athletes".
