= General Lamadrid Department =

General Lamadrid Departamento General Lamadrid
- Department
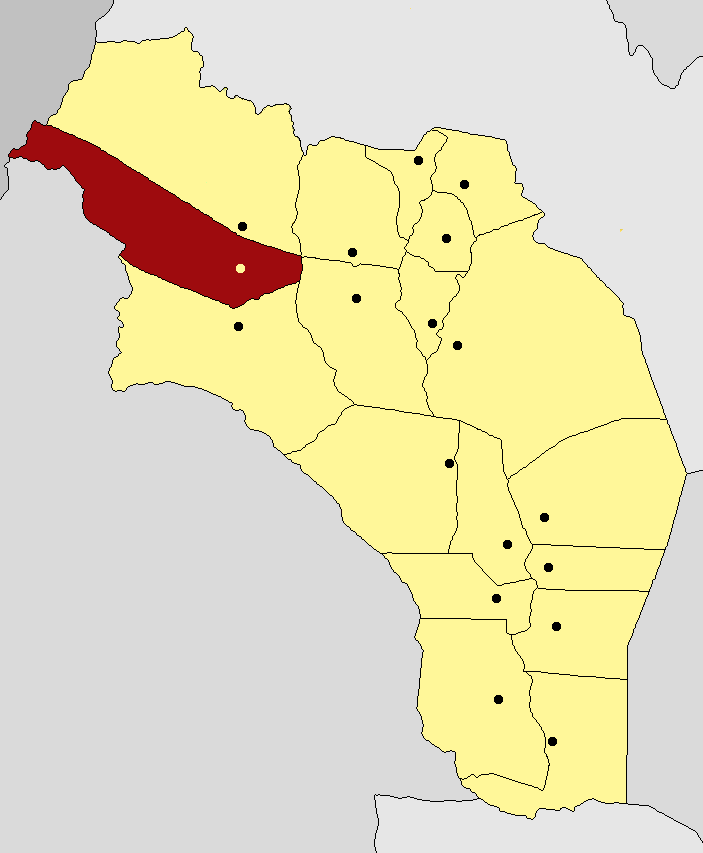
- Departamento General Lamadrid (La Rioja - Argentina)
- Interactive map of General Lamadrid
- Country: Argentina
- Seat: Villa Castelli

Area
  - Total: 6,719 km^{2} (2,594 sq mi)

Population (2022)
  - Total: 1,886
  - Density: 0.2807/km^{2} (0.7270/sq mi)

General Lamadrid is a department of La Rioja Province (Argentina).
