= Florence Arthaud =

French sailor (1957–2015)

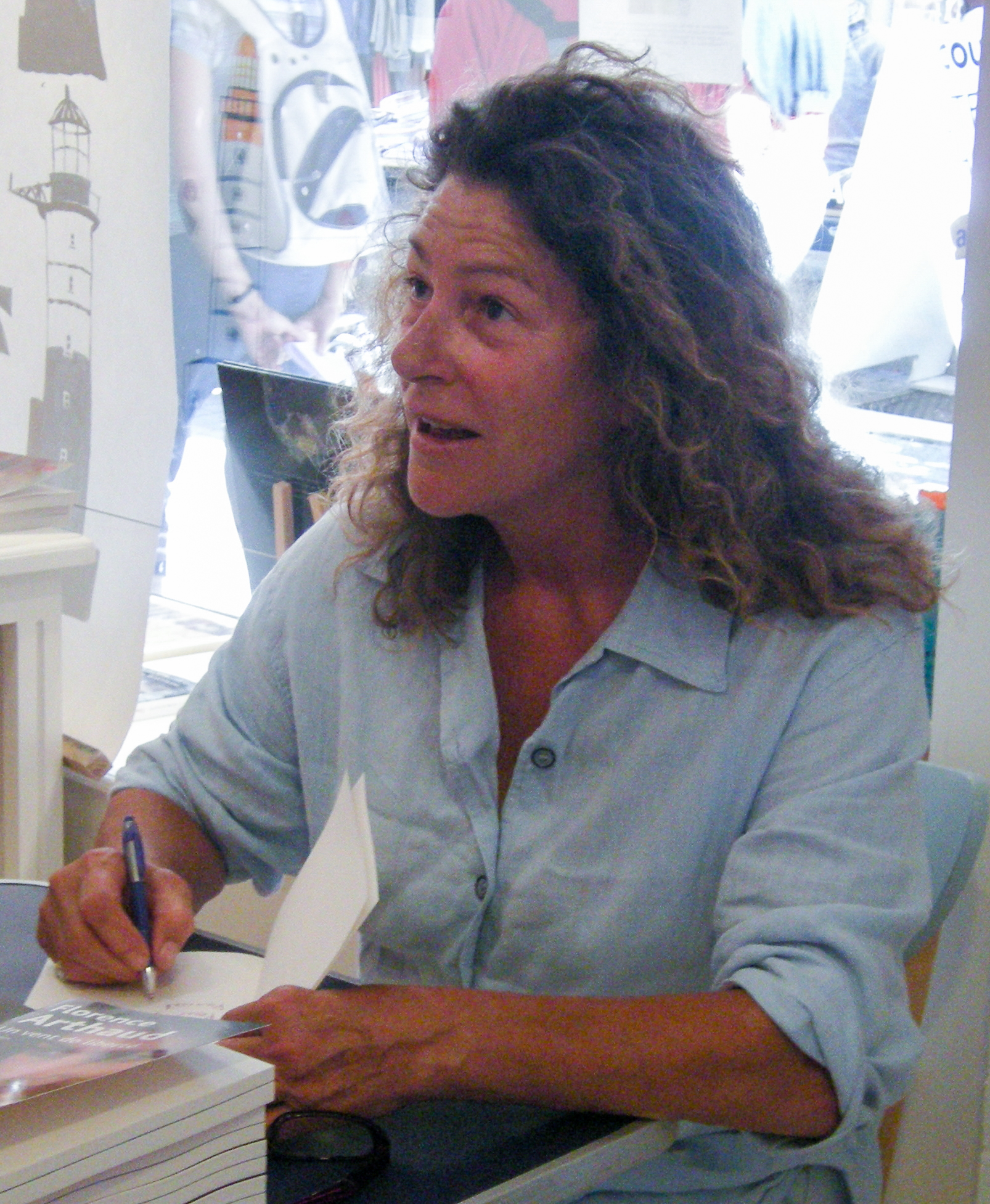
- Arthaud in 2009

Personal information
- Nickname: "La petite fiancée de l'Atlantique"
- Nationality: French
- Born: 28 October 1957 Boulogne-Billancourt, France
- Died: 9 March 2015 (aged 57) Villa Castelli, La Rioja, Argentina

Sailing career
- Sport: Sailing

Florence Arthaud (28 October 1957 – 9 March 2015) was a French sailor. In 1990, she became the first woman to win the Route du Rhum.

She died in a helicopter crash in the Argentine province of La Rioja while she was participating in the filming of the reality TV show, Dropped, along with other French athletes.

== Biography ==
=== Youth ===
Florence Arthaud was the daughter of Jacques Arthaud, director of the Grenoble publishing house, Arthaud, during the 1970s, which published the memoirs of sailors Bernard Moitessier and Éric Tabarly. Arthaud started sailing at a very young age with her brother, Jean-Marie, and her father. She then sharpened her skills at the Antibes sailing club.

In 1974, at the age of seventeen, Arthaud was in a serious car accident, which resulted in a coma and paralysis. She was hospitalized for six months and her recovery took two years. During her recovery, she made her first crossing of the Atlantic at the age of eighteen with French navigator Jean-Claude Parisis.

=== Sailing career ===
Florence Arthaud raced in the first edition of Route du Rhum, which took place in 1978. She placed 11th. In 1986, she diverted from the race to try to assist Loïc Caradec, but found the catamaran Royale capsized and no trace of the sailor.

In August 1990, she tackled the record for a solo crossing of the North Atlantic, held by Bruno Peyron. She beat the record by almost two days, with a time of 9 days, 21 hours, and 42 minutes. In November of the same year, she won the Route du Rhum, reaching Pointe-à-Pitre in 14 days, 10 hours, and 10 minutes. However, following this exploit, she was unable to find funding to build a new trimaran, due to the real estate crisis from which her sponsor was suffering.

She sailed in the 1989–90 Whitbread Round the World Race on board Charles Jourdan. In 1997, she won the Transpacific with Bruno Peyron.

In 2010, for the twentieth anniversary of her victory, she could not find a sponsor.

=== Sailing accident ===
On 29 October 2011, she fell from her boat in the middle of the night off Cap Corse. Fortunately she had with her a headlamp and a waterproof mobile phone. Arthaud managed to call her mother who then called her brother. He then alerted the CROSS (the French Coast Guard) and three hours and twenty minutes after her distress call, she was located using the geolocation of her mobile phone. Conscious but in a state of hypothermia, she was airlifted to a Bastia hospital, from which she was released the following day.

=== Personal life ===
Arthaud had one daughter, Marie (born 1993), with professional sailor Loïc Lingois.

In 2005, she married Éric Charpentier, but they separated shortly afterwards. She was later in a relationship with navigator Philippe Monnet.

Arthaud struggled with alcoholism. According to her autibiography, her driving licence was suspended in 2010 and many of her sponsors dropped her. She found comfort with the association ‘The wheel turns,’ which helps celebrities who are in trouble.

=== Other activities ===
In 2014, she took part in Sea Shepherd's "GrindStop" campaign against pilot-whale hunt in the Faroe Islands.

Her autobiography, Un vent de liberté, prefaced by Olivier de Kersauson, was published in 2009. Before her death, Florence Arthaud had been working on a race project reserved for women, the first edition of which was to take place in the Mediterranean during the summer of 2015.

The year before her death, she worked with the writer and playwright, Jean-Louis Bachelet, on a new memoir. She had completed the book, titled Tonight, the Sea is Black (Cette nuit, la mer est noire), which was released by her father’s publishing house on 19 March 2015, ten days after her death.

== Death ==
On 9 March 2015, Arthaud was killed in a helicopter crash in Argentina during filming of the television reality show, Dropped. Nine other people were killed in the accident, including French swimmer Camille Muffat and boxer Alexis Vastine. The other victims were the two Argentinian pilots and five French members of the production team, Adventure Line Productions.

In accordance with her last wishes, Arthaud was cremated. Some of her ashes are buried on the Île Sainte-Marguerite, opposite Cannes, while the rest were scattered at sea.

== See also ==
- Isabelle Autissier
- Alain Colas
- Clarisse Crémer
- Michel Desjoyeaux
- Olivier de Kersauson
- Jean Le Cam
- Armel Le Cléac’h
- Bernard Moitessier
- Philippe Poupon
- Éric Tabarly
- Jean-Luc Van Den Heede
