= 2015 Villa Castelli mid-air collision =

Accident involving two helicopters in Argentina

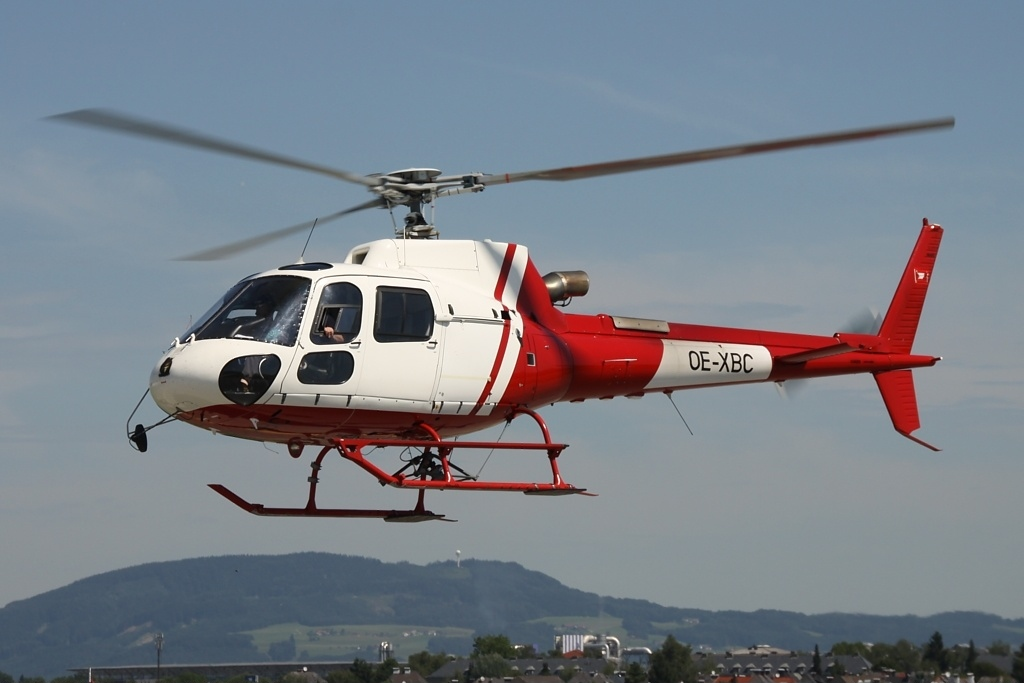
- A Eurocopter AS350B3 Écureuil similar to the two involved in the collision

Accident
- Date: 9 March 2015; 11 years ago
- Summary: Mid-air collision caused by pilot error
- Site: Villa Castelli, La Rioja Province, Argentina; 29°01′05″S 68°13′37″W
- Total fatalities: 10
- Total survivors: 0

First aircraft
- Type: Eurocopter AS350B3 Écureuil
- Registration: LQ-CGK
- Occupants: 5
- Passengers: 4
- Crew: 1
- Fatalities: 5
- Survivors: 0

Second aircraft
- Type: Eurocopter AS350B3 Écureuil
- Registration: LQ-FJQ
- Occupants: 5
- Passengers: 4
- Crew: 1
- Fatalities: 5
- Survivors: 0

On 9 March 2015, two Eurocopter AS350 Écureuil helicopters collided mid-air near Villa Castelli, Argentina, killing all ten people on board both aircraft.

The helicopters had just departed together from the same spot and collided during the initial climb-out. They were transporting production staff and French sports stars participating in the French reality TV series Dropped. Among the victims were French sailor Florence Arthaud, swimmer Camille Muffat and boxer Alexis Vastine.

== Background ==
The French television channel TF1 was filming an episode of Dropped, a reality TV show that takes celebrities to a hostile environment by helicopter and films their efforts to survive. The cast comprised various Olympic medallists and international sportspeople, including French athletes Alain Bernard, Philippe Candeloro, Jeannie Longo, and Sylvain Wiltord, plus Arthaud, Muffat and Vastine; Swiss athlete Anne-Flore Marxer was also taking part.

Filming began in late February 2015 in Ushuaia, in the far south of Argentina, before moving to Northwest Argentina, in the province of La Rioja, about 1,170 kilometres (730 mi) from the capital Buenos Aires. At the time of the accident, Wiltord had already been eliminated from the competition and was back in France.

== Collision ==
Each helicopter was carrying four passengers in addition to the pilot. Seconds after taking off together, at about 17:15 local time (20:15 UTC), the two helicopters collided while climbing away at a height of about 100 metres (330 ft), and both crashed to the ground.

External videos
- Footage of the collision

A video of the accident appears to show the lower of the two helicopters climbing at a higher rate than the one above, colliding with the latter from below. Weather conditions at the time were reported as good.

== Aircraft ==
The two aircraft involved were both Eurocopter AS350B3 Écureuil; one was registered LQ-CGK, the other LQ-FJQ. LQ-CGK was manufactured in 2010 and was owned by the provincial government of La Rioja. LQ-FJQ was manufactured in 2012 and was owned by the provincial government of Santiago del Estero.

== Victims ==
All ten people on board both aircraft were killed in the accident, including French athletes Florence Arthaud, Camille Muffat and Alexis Vastine. The others killed were the two Argentinian pilots and five French members of the production team, Adventure Line Productions. The other show contestants were reported to have been waiting on the ground nearby when the accident occurred.

== Reactions ==
- François Hollande, President of France, said, "The sudden death of our fellow French nationals is a cause of immense sadness."
- Sylvain Wiltord, French footballer, tweeted, "I'm sad for my friends, I'm trembling, I'm horrified, I have no words, I don't want to say anything."
- TF1 issued a statement saying, "All TF1 teams come together in this terrible time with the pain of the families and relatives of the victims."

== Investigation ==
The Junta de Investigaciones de Accidentes de Aviación Civil (JIAAC), Argentina's state body in charge of air accident inquires, opened an investigation, assisted by their French counterpart Bureau d'Enquêtes et d'Analyses pour la Sécurité de l'Aviation Civile (BEA). French prosecutors also opened a case.

The deputy leader of the Radical Civic Union party stated that LQ-CGK was an official helicopter of La Rioja province, only meant to be used for medical emergencies. Governor Luis Beder Herrera confirmed this statement and stated that the helicopter had been "lent" to a tourism company.

The final report, released in Spanish, English and French, determined the factors related to the accident as:

- Location of the helicopter that was filming (LQ-FJQ), from the "outside", in the path of both aircraft, that significantly limited the visual contact of the pilot who had to move forward in flight in order to film the target (LQ-CGK);
- Lack of a formal assessment of the safety risks for an unusual operation (filming and flight in proximity), which prevented the identification and analysis of the dangers inherent to that operation, and the adoption of mitigation actions, requirement not required by the current regulations;
- Deficiencies in the operation planning that led to the accident, including the failure of observing the "see and be seen" concept or an evasive maneuver if visual contact is lost between both aircraft;
- Lack of formal procedures in accordance with the nature of the operations performed;
- The use of aircraft whose public identification prefix does not imply providing logistics and aerial support for filming of a completely private nature;
- Ambiguity in the observance of regulations related to air operations of public aircraft.

== See also ==
- List of civilian mid-air collisions
