= Zodiak Media =

Former Swedish-French television production company

- Logo used from 2012 to 2016
- Formerly: MTV Produktion AB (1981–2005); Zodiak Television AB (2005–2008); Zodiak Entertainment (2008–2010); Zodiak Media Group (2010–2012)
- Type: Subsidiary
- Industry: Entertainment
- Predecessors: Magnolia Group; Marathon Group; RDF Media Group
- Founded: 1981; 45 years ago, in Sweden
- Defunct: 2016; 10 years ago, in Paris, France
- Fate: Acquired by, merged with, and folded into Banijay Group; some assets still retained the Zodiak name
- Successor: Banijay Group
- Headquarters: Paris, France
- Area served: Worldwide
- Services: Television production
- Parent: DeAgostini (2008–2016)
- Divisions: Zodiak Active; Zodiak Americas; Zodiak Belgium; Zodiak France; Zodiak Finland; Zodiak Kids; Zodiak India (51%); Zodiak Iberia; Zodiak Italy; Zodiak Los Angeles; Zodiak MEAA; Zodiak Nederland; Zodiak Nordic; Zodiak UK; Zodiak Russia; Zodiak Rights
- Subsidiaries: Adventure Line Productions; Bwark Productions; The Comedy Unit; GTV Productions; IWC Media; Jarowskij; KM Productions; Magnolia; Mastiff; RDF Television; Red House; Sol Productions; TeleAlliance; Touchpaper Television; Yellow Bird

Zodiak Media (formerly known as MTV Produktion AB, Zodiak Television AB, Zodiak Entertainment and Zodiak Media Group) was a Swedish and later French global independent television production & distribution conglomerate that was owned by Italian publishing company DeAgostini. The company was best known for producing and distributing entertainment, animated series, scripted & non-scripted content across multiple providers worldwide. The company had a significant global presence, with production companies in 15 countries and a distribution service based in both France and United Kingdom. The original iteration was originally a technically facility in Sweden before expanding into television production & distribution and being moved to France in 2008.

De Agostini spun-off Zodiak Media and merged it with fellow French production & distribution company Banijay Group in February 2016, which then became the world's leading independent producer of content for television and multimedia platforms.

Zodiak's international distribution arm, Zodiak Rights (now Banijay Rights) continued as the new international distribution arm of Banijay Entertainment company and its one of the leading distributors on the international market. Its catalogue has over 20,000 hours of programming.

== History ==
The Zodiak Media group was formed by the successive acquisition of television production companies under the impetus of the DeAgostini: Magnolia and Marathon Media in 2007 (Italy, Spain and France), Zodiak Television in 2008 (Scandinavia, Eastern Europe and Russia), RDF Media in 2010 (United Kingdom and United States).

Zodiak Media had its beginnings in 1981 when it founded as MTV Produktion AB under the name Mobile Television originally known as a technical facility that create outside broadcasts and produced sport events in Sweden for production companies, but when commercial (cable television) began established in the country in the late 1980s, they decided to move into entertainment television programming. In August 1995, MTV Produktion AB launched their own Danish division in Denmark named MTV Produktion A/S. Two months later in October of that same year, MTV Production AB had acquired Kanon Television from Swedish television production company Strix, marking MTV Produktion AB's first acquisition of a production outfit as Kanon Television became a subsidiary of MTV Produktion AB.

In 1990 thirteen years before MTV brought Mastiff, Mastiff Media was founded in 1990 under its former name Wegelius Television as an independent production company by its founder Annie Wegelius after when she departures TV3. By January 1995, Bonnier Group announced that their Svensk Filmindustri (which is now known as SF Studios) had acquired independent production company Wegelius Television with its founder Annie Wegelius continued to be the president of the company.

In Italy, Magnolia SPA was founded in 2000 by Giorgio Gori as an independent reality television production company so it could adapt entertainment formats to Italian networks, whilst Kinnevik AB sold its shares in MTV Produktion AB.

In November 2001, Wegelius Television had announced that they've rebranded as Mastiff Media by their CEO Brita Sohlberg in order for them to expand their operations.

In April 2003, a major pan-Scandinavian entertainment production giant was born when MTV Produktion AB announced that they've acquired Mastiff Media AB from its parent company Bonnier Group marking their first acquisition with Bonnier acquiring a 36% stake in MTV Produktion AB along with the two companies retaining their brands.

In September 2003 following the acquisition of Mastiff Media back in April of that same year, MTV Produktion AB had announced that they've merged MTV and Mastiff Media together to form a new production group named MTV Mastiff Production AB within the MTV Produktion AB company with the focus on their core activities along with their production & distribution of their Nordic formats, whilst the MTV and Mastiff brands had been retained as MTV Produktion AB launched their own in-house international distribution division named MTV Mastiff International to distribute their formats to other countries.

In August 2004 a year after MTV Produktion AB brought Swedish production studio Mastiff Media and created the MTV Mastiff, MTV Produktion AB announced they've brought fellow Swedish production company Jarowskij along with its Finland subsidiary Jarowskij Finland, marking MTV Produktion AB's first entry into the Finnish television production operations as MTV Produktion AB's international distribution arm MTV Mastiff International distributing Jarowskij's productions worldwide, and merged the former company with their own production company MTV Mastiff Production AB to becoming the biggest Scandinavian production group with the MTV Mastiff and Jarowskij brands were being retained after the merger. By the following year in 2005 after MTV Produktion AB's acquisition of Swedish production company Jarowskij and the merger of MTV Produktion AB's division MTV Mastiff Produktion AB with the acquired Swedish production studio Jarowskij back in August 2004, MTV Produktion AB rebranded themselves to Zodiak Television AB with their international division MTV Mastiff International also being renamed to Zodiak Television World with their division MTV Mastiff being retained as a production label within the renamed company.

In May 2005 following the rebranding of MTV Production AB into Zodiak Television AB, Zodiak Television AB expanded its operations in Finland by announcing that they've acquired Finnish production company Broadcasters Group, marking Zodiak Television's first acquisition of a production company and the rebranded group's second production company acquisition in general along with the expansion of its Finnish production activities with Broadcasters Group's management continued leading the company under Zodiak. Later on the 26th of that same month following Zodiak's acquisition of Finnish production group Broadcasters, Zodiak Television AB became a wholly independent production & distribution company when its previous parent Bonnier Group sold its 25% in the Swedish production group and one month later in June of that year Zodiak Television AB announced its planning of a SEK 117 million share issue in order to fund its future production company acquisitions.

In January 2006, Zodiak Television AB announced that they brought out a 35% stake in Polish production company Zebra Media, marking Zodiak Television's first entry into the Polish television production business.

In February 2006, Zodiak Television AB expanded its operations into Eastern Europe by acquiring a 34% stake in Russian production company TeleAlliance along with their companies Dixi Media, Teleformat and Rytm, marking the first time the Copenhagen-based entertainment group entered the Russian television market.

In March 2006, Zodiak Television AB announced that they've acquired Danish production company Look Productions, thus expanding Zodiak's Danish operations in that country.

In October 2006, Zodiak Television AB entered the British television production industry for the first time by announcing their acquisition of British factual production outfit Diverse Productions from FBC Group, marking Zodiak Television's first entry to the UK market with Diverse's international distribution division Diverse International being folded into Zodiak's own international distribution division Zodiak Television World.

In January 2007, Italian publisher De Agostini acquired a controlling stake in Italian reality television production company Magnolia founder its Giorgio Gori. In that same month, Zodiak Television AB announced that they've launched a new Russian division based in Moscow named Zodiak Vostok.

In February 2007, Zodiak Television AB brought Swedish-based TV and film production company Yellow Bird to strengthen its drama production operations in both Swedish and Europe, effectively Yellow Bird became a subsidiary of Zodiak Television AB with Jarowskij's drama production output being folded into the acquired company thrust expanding Zodiak's Swedish operations in that country as Yellow Bird's co-founder Ole Søndberg continued operating Yellow Bird as creative chief.

In August 2007, Zodiak Television AB strengthened their Russian operations in the Russian and CIS market by announcing that they had brought a 75% majority stake in Kiev-based Ukraine largest TV movie production company YS Films and placed it under their Russian production subsidiary Dixi Media, marking Zodiak Television's entry into the Ukrainian television industry as YS Films started producing television series for broadcasters in Ukraine. A few days later in that same month, they've brought London-based British television production company Bullseye TV with the latter's distribution arm folded into Zodiak's international division with Zodiak Television AB's distribution division Zodiak Television World planning to move its international distribution business from its home region of Copenhagen to London, England from January 2008.

At the start of October 2007, Zodiak Television announced that they've joined forces with the successful Benelux production company Kanakna by acquiring the latter group along with its shareholders expanding Zodiak's operations in the Benelux region. Eight days later on the 8th of that same year, Zodiak Television announced that they had acquired 35% stake in Indian independent production company Sol, marking Zodiak Television's expansion outside of Europe and the first time Zodiak entered the Indian television industry. On March 30, 2010, Zodiak announced that they increased their stake in Indian-based production company by acquiring 51% stake in the company.

In November 2007, Zodiak Television AB through its distribution division Zodiak Television World moved their international distribution offices from Copenhagen, Denmark to London, England starting from January 2008 with Zodiak Television World hiring former SDI Media and Disney executive John Coleman to become their operation manager along with Sarah Coursey joining Zodiak as their head of formats and acquisitions. Later in that same month, Zodiak Television AB expanded its British television operations by announcing they've brought Damon Pattison's production company Lucky Day Productions and placed it under their UK operations.

=== Acqusition by De Agostini and major expansions ===
In May 2008, Italian-based holding and publishing company De Agostini who owns French-based production and distribution company Marathon Group and Magnolia, announced that they've made a deal to acquire Stockholm-based Swedish/Scandinavian international television production and distribution company Zodiak Television AB in a deal that would bring De Agostini's television subsidiaries Marathon Group and Magnolia together with Zodiak Television AB into one global entertainment production and distribution company. Five months later in November of that same year, De Agostini announced that they've completed their acquisition of Stockholm-based Swedish/Scandinavian international television production and distribution company Zodiak Television AB with DeAgostini's French television & animation subsidiary Marathon Group and Italian television outfit being placed under the acquired company effectively turned Zodiak Television AB into a European entertainment production powerhouse. The combined European production & distribution entitle had been rebranded & renamed by changing its name to Zodiak Entertainment moving the group into the global television content market with the company's head offices moved from its home country of Sweden to Paris, France as the rebranded group was aiming to acquiring more production companies.

In October 2009, Zodiak Entertainment announced that they're expanding their UK operations by taking the acquisition in British factual and drama specialist indie production company Dangerous Films. They also announced that they've entering into the American Spanish-language market by launching a new production joint-venture company based in Miami with the Ricky Martin Entertainment Group being named RM 5to Elemento with the new joint venture company being headed by the CEO of Ricky Martin Entertainment Group Bruno Del Granado.

In April 2010, Zodiak Entertainment along with their Miami-based joint venture production subsidiary RM 5to Elemento announced that they've established a production office based in Bogota, Colombia and had hired former Endemol Andino and Caracol Televisión executive Juan Maldonado to head the production office as their managing director.

In June 2010, Zodiak Entertainment had announced that they're acquiring UK-based British independent production and distribution company RDF Media Group bringing together Zodiak Entertainment's operations with those of RDF Media Group as David Frank the former CEO and founder of RDF Media and RDF Television becoming the new CEO of the enlarged Zodiak Entertainment group along with chairman and CEO of both De Agostini Group and Zodiak Entertainment Lorenzo Pellicioli continued to serve as chairman of the combined group. Three months later in September of that same year, Zodiak Entertainment announced that they're rebranding themselves by renaming it to Zodiak Media Group following Zodiak's acquisition of British independent production company RDF Media Group with RDF's international division RDF Rights being folded into Zodiak's international distribution division Zodiak International Distribution and was being renamed to Zodiak Rights.

In December 2010, Zodiak Media Group announced that they're merging their two existing digital and branded content operations which were Italian Neo Network and British operation RDF Connect into one new global digital division dedicated to creation, production and development named Zodiak Active with president and CEO of Neo Network Marco Ferrari and founder/president of Magnolia and CEO of Zodiak's division Zodiak South Europe Giorgio Gori heading the new division.

On February 24, 2011, Zodiak Media Group had announced that they're launching a children's TV production subsidiary that can specialise its family and youth programs called Zodiak Kids with their existing four kids productions companies along with the Kids & Family sales division of Zodiak Rights being united into one company.

In April 2011, Zodiak Media Group announced a restructuring of its Latin American operations by launching a new division named Zodiak América Latina with Magnolia founder and president of Zodiak Southern Europe Giorgio Gori and chief operating officer Nicola Drago leading the division. Their Miami-based joint venture production company with Ricky Martin Entertainment RM 5to Elemento and Rio de Janeiro-based Brazilian production company Zodiak Brasil was placed under Zodiak América Latina with the former being renamed to Zodiak Latino with Harris Whitbeck became the CEO of the rebranded division.

On July 28, 2011, Zodiak Media Group announced that it had acquired British-based independent producer Bwark Productions, further expanding its British operations in that country.

In January 2012, as part of the wider strategy to strengthen its group operations and dive into future development, Zodiak Media Group announced that they were rebranding the company again this time they changed their name to just Zodiak Media with Vincent Chalvon-Demersay the CEO of Marathon Media being named as Zodiak's chief straight officer.

In late-March 2012, Zodiak Media announced that they've sold their Polish television production company Mastiff Media Polska to their management team led by Grzegorz Piekarski in order for Zodiak Media to focus on their Scandinavian market and their Nordic formats with Mastiff Media Polska will be renamed the following months and will work closely with Zodiak's distribution division Zodiak Rights under an exclusive deal.

In June 2012, Zodiak Media's announced that its CCO Natalie Znak, who had run Zodiak USA back when it was known as RDF Media Group's American production division RDF USA, had been appointed as president of Zodiak Media's Los Angeles-based American production division Zodiak USA as Natalie Znak started running Zodiak Media's Los Angeles-based American production division Zodiak USA alongside its New York production office.

In July 2012, Zodiak Media announced that their consolidating their production operations in the United States by launching their new division named Zodiak Americas.

In September 2013, Zodiak Media announced that its CEO David Frank, who had joined the French entertainment media production group Zodiak Media after merging with British independent production/distribution group RDF Media Group back in 2010, had depatured the role of CEO at Zodiak Media as the global TV production group had appointed media executive, former Showtime Arabia president, former CEO of Canal+ Nordic, Marc-Antoine d’Halluin to become the new CEO of the French TV production group Zodiak Media, marking the first time a French media executive to run Zodiak Media.

In March 2014, Zodiak Media had appointed former Canal+ veteran Gaspard de Chavagnac to become president of Zodiak Media's French-based in-house production companies including GTV Productions and Mona Lisa Productions alongside taking on leadership of Zodiak's fellow main French-based unscripted, scripted & animation entertainment production units like Adventure Line Productions, KM Production and Marathon Media.

=== Merger with Banijay Group ===
In June 2015, Zodiak Media announced that they're in advanced exclusive talks to merge with French-based European global international television production giant Banijay Group that would combine the two companies operations into one pan-European global independent international television production and distribution company under the Banijay Group name. The deal would also bring the latter company back to the British television market. A month later in July of that same year, Zodiak Media announced that they had agreed to merge their operations and their production labels with those of the French-based independent international television production and distribution company Banijay Group with Zodiak CEO Marc-Antoine d'Halluin stepping down following the merger with the founder of Banijay Stéphane Courbit and Banijay's CEO Marco Bassetti will take over of the merged business. A year later in January 2016, Zodiak Media announced that the European Commission (EC) had approved their merger with French-based independent international television and distribution company Banijay Group. A month later in February of that same year, Zodiak Media announced that they had completed their merger with French-based independent international television production and distribution company Banijay Group as the latter had become the world's biggest leading indie television production company with Zodiak Media's distribution division Zodiak Rights retained its name and Vivendi had acquired a 26% stake in the combined company.

== Divisions ==
=== Zodiak Nederland ===
Zodiak Nederland (formerly known as Palm Plus) was a Dutch television production company that was founded in 1992 by Ruud van Breugel and became a division of Zodiak Media in 2008.

In December 1998 nine years before Zodiak acquired Palm Plus, Plam Plus announced that they brought Dutch production/distribution and licensing company Pri-Mation Media the parent company of Telescreen from Japanese organisation Mitsui, giving Palm Plus their own children's production & distribution division and their entry into the children's genre with Telescreen became part of Palm Plus. However seven years later on February 25, 2005, Palm Plus Multimedia would eventually exit the children's genre by selling Telescreen under a management buyout when Telescreen's CEO Ruud Van Breugel had stepped down, returning Telescreen into an independent distribution company as Palm Plus gained a 51% stake in Telescreen.

=== Zodiak Los Angeles ===
Zodiak Los Angeles was founded in 2006 by the British entertainment company and parent company of RDF Television called the RDF Media Group straight under the name RDF USA. After the merger between the British company RDF Media Group and the French entertainment company Zodiak Entertainment along with the rebranding the latter to Zodiak Media Group, Zodiak announced that they merged Zodiak Entertainment US with RDF USA and renamed it as Zodiak USA.

== Key programs ==
Among the programs produced by Zodiak Media: Being Human, the supernatural series produced for the BBC and SyFy US; Wallander; the Millennium Trilogy; the French series Sous le soleil, and Versailles, in co-production with Capa and Incendo for Canal+.

Zodiak Media is also the originator of the formats Koh-Lanta, Fort Boyard (Adventure Line Productions), Sing If You Can, Killer Karaoke, The Secret Millionaire, The Best Singers (Swedish), and Location, Location, Location.

Zodiak Kids' catalogue includes programs such as Waybuloo, Totally Spies!, Rekkit Rabbit, Mister Maker, and Gormiti.

== See also ==
- De Agostini
- Stéphane Courbit
