= Junta de Seguridad en el Transporte =

Argentine government agency

Junta de Seguridad en el Transporte (JST) is an Argentine government agency that investigates transportation accidents and incidents. Its headquarters are in Buenos Aires.

It was created in 2019, absorbing the former Junta de Investigación de Accidentes de Aviación Civil (JIAAC).

In 2022 the agency developed a map of transportation accidents across Argentina, one that is updated around the clock.

Julián Obaid was president until 2024.
