= Junta de Investigación de Accidentes de Aviación Civil =

Junta de Investigation de Accidentes de Aviación Civil
Agency overview
- Formed: 1954
- Dissolved: 2019
- Jurisdiction: Argentina
- Headquarters: Avenida Belgrano 1370, 12th floor, Buenos Aires
- Agency executive: Pamela Suárez (Last President)

The Junta de Investigación de Accidentes de Aviación Civil (JIAAC), in English the Civil Aviation Accident Investigation Board, was an agency of Argentina under the purview of the Ministry of Transport of the Argentine Nation that investigated air accidents. Its headquarters were in Buenos Aires.

Its mission was to determine the causes of accidents and incidents that occurred in the field of civil aviation, in order to then recommend effective actions aimed at avoiding the occurrence of air events in the future, the agency worked to promote operational safety in the entire field of civil, national and international aviation. It had four administrative regions. The board was replaced by the Junta de Seguridad en el Transporte (JST) ("Transportation Safety Board") in 2019, as stipulated by Law 27,514, The new JST expanded its studies and research to all modes of transportation. It investigates aeronautical accidents and incidents as well as railway, automotive, maritime, river and lake accidents, as well as multimodal interface accidents.

Pamela Suárez was the last president of the JIAAC.

== See also ==
- Aerolíneas Argentinas Flight 644
- Aerolíneas Argentinas Flight 707
- LAPA Flight 3142
- Sol Líneas Aéreas Flight 5428
- Villa Castelli helicopter collision
- C5N helicopter accident
