= Anne-Flore Marxer =

Franco-Swiss snowboarder

Anne-Flore Marxer (born 24 January 1984) is a Swiss-French snowboarder.

Born in Lausanne, Switzerland, Marxer grew up in Preverenges, starting snowboarding at an early age as soon as she could walk. She started competing in 2004. In 2011, she won the Freeride World Tour.

== Major victories ==
Year	Event	Location	Result	Reference
2011	Freeride World Tour (overall ranking)	Worldwide	World Champion
2011	Freeride World Tour	Chamonix Mont-Blanc	1st place
2011	Freeride World Tour – Verbier Xtreme	Verbier	1st place
2016	Freeride World Tour	Chamonix Mont-Blanc	1st place
2016	Freeride World Tour	Haines, Alaska	1st place
2017	Freeride World Tour – Verbier Xtreme	Verbier	1st place
2017	Freeride World Tour	Vallnord Arcalís (Andorra)	1st place
