= Camille Muffat =

French swimmer (1989–2015)

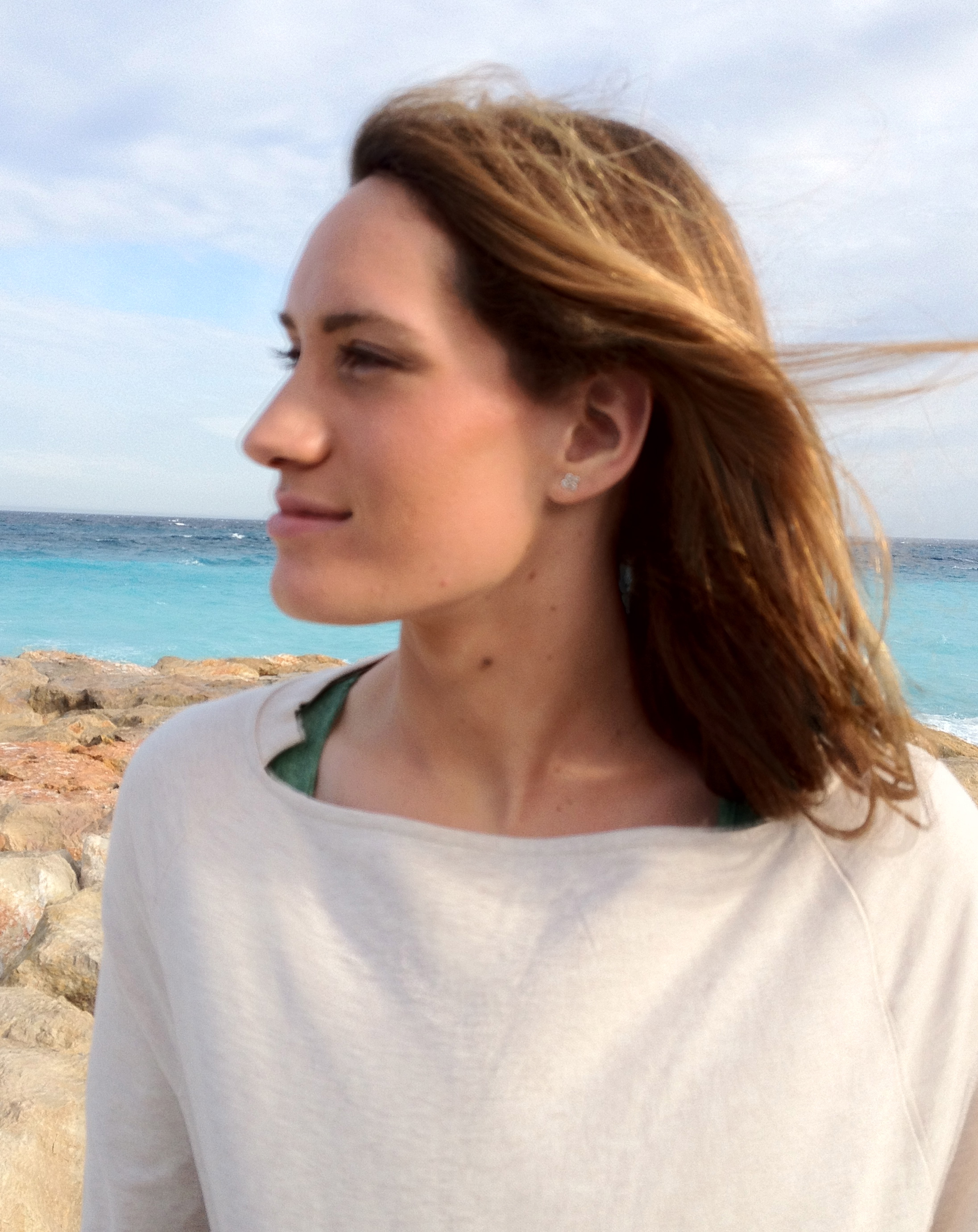
- Muffat in 2012

Personal information
- Full name: Camille-Marie Manuella; Muffat
- Nationality: France
- Born: 28 October 1989 Nice, France
- Died: 9 March 2015 (aged 25) Villa Castelli, La Rioja, Argentina
- Height: 1.83 m (6 ft 0 in)
- Weight: 71 kg (157 lb)

Sport
- Sport: Swimming
- Strokes: Freestyle, medley
- Club: Olympique Nice Natation
Medal record
Swimming
Representing France
Event	1st	2nd	3rd
Olympic Games	1	1	1
World Championships (LC)	0	0	4
World Championships (SC)	1	0	1
European Championships (LC)	0	1	1
European Championships (SC)	4	2	1
Mediterranean Games	1	0	0
Total	7	4	8
Olympic Games
Gold medal – first place	2012 London	400 m freestyle
Silver medal – second place	2012 London	200 m freestyle
Bronze medal – third place	2012 London	4×200 m freestyle
World Championships (LC)
Bronze medal – third place	2011 Shanghai	200 m freestyle
Bronze medal – third place	2011 Shanghai	400 m freestyle
Bronze medal – third place	2013 Barcelona	200 m freestyle
Bronze medal – third place	2013 Barcelona	4×200 m freestyle
World Championships (SC)
Gold medal – first place	2010 Dubai	200 m freestyle
Bronze medal – third place	2010 Dubai	4×200 m freestyle
European Championships (LC)
Silver medal – second place	2010 Budapest	4×200 m freestyle
Bronze medal – third place	2008 Eindhoven	200 m medley
European Championships (SC)
Gold medal – first place	2007 Debrecen	200 m medley
Gold medal – first place	2012 Chartres	200 m freestyle
Gold medal – first place	2012 Chartres	400 m freestyle
Gold medal – first place	2012 Chartres	4×50 m mixed freestyle
Silver medal – second place	2006 Helsinki	200 m medley
Silver medal – second place	2008 Rijeka	400 m freestyle
Bronze medal – third place	2007 Debrecen	400 m medley
Mediterranean Games
Gold medal – first place	2009 Pescara	200 m medley

Camille Muffat (French pronunciation: [ka.mij myfa]; 28 October 1989 – 9 March 2015) was a French swimmer and three-time Olympic medalist who specialised in the individual medley and the free style events. Her career spanned from 2005 to 2014.

At the 2012 Summer Olympics in London, she won gold in the 400-metre freestyle, silver in the 200-metre freestyle and bronze in the 4×200-metre freestyle relay, becoming the fourth French swimmer to win an individual Olympic gold medal. She was also the third French athlete overall to win three Olympic medals at a single edition of the Olympic Games.

She died in the Villa Castelli mid-air helicopter collision, at age 25, during the filming of French TV reality show Dropped for the TF1 network.

== Early life ==
Camille Marie Manuella Muffat was born on 28 October 1989 in Nice, to Guy Muffat, a physical therapist, and Laurence, a nurse. She had an older sister, Chloé, and a younger brother, Quentin.

Upon finishing high school, she pursued a degree in economics, during which time she swam under a high-performance athlete studying system. She eventually dropped out of school in order to pursue her swimming career.

== Career ==
=== 2005–2007 ===
Muffat began swimming competitively at Club Olympic Nice Natation, at the age of nine. She initially trained as a medley swimmer and was particularly gifted in the breaststroke and front crawl.

Muffat first rose to prominence in 2005, upon beating fellow Frenchwoman Laure Manaudou in the 200 m individual medley event at the French National Championship, in Nancy, also breaking the French national record, which Manaudou had held.

Only months later, she won gold in the 200 m individual medley event and silver in the 100 m freestyle at the European Junior Championships, held in Budapest, Hungary.

In 2006, she debuted in the senior European Championships by swimming a leg of the 4 × 100 metres freestyle relay for France. A month later, she won four medals, including one gold, at that year's World Junior Championships, in Rio de Janeiro, Brazil. In December 2006, she attained her first international podium, at the European Short Course Championships in Helsinki, Finland.

In 2007, for the first time Muffat took part in a World Championship, held in Melbourne, Australia, reaching semifinals in the 400 m medley. At the end of the year, she won her first senior competition, by winning the 200-metre individual medley and taking bronze in the 400-metre individual medley event at the 2007 European Short Course Swimming Championships in Debrecen, Hungary.

=== 2008–2011 ===
In March 2008, Muffat won her first medal as a senior, long-course international event, by taking bronze at the 200-metre individual medley at the European Championships in Eindhoven, Netherlands.

On the first day of the 2008 French national championships, a qualifying event for that year's Olympic Games, Muffat and Joanne Andraca tied in the 400 m individual medley (IM) in a new French record of 4:38.23. Two days later, she won gold at the 200-metre individual medley by breaking Laure Manaudou's French record. At the end of competition, Muffat had qualified for the 200- and the 400-metre individual medley events at the Olympics, and clinched a berth in the French team for the 4 × 200 metre freestyle relay.

At the 2008 Summer Olympics, however, Muffat only qualified for the final of the relay, where the team finished fifth.

Later, at the 2008 European Short Course Championships, held in Rijeka, Muffat finished second in the 400-metre freestyle, bested by her countrywoman and former Olympic relay teammate, Coralie Balmy. On both the 200- and 400-metre individual medley events, she finished in fifth place.

At the 2009 French national championships, Muffat set a new French record in the 200 m IM (2:09.34). At that year's World Championships, in Rome, she finished 7th in the 200 m individual medley final, and takes part in the French team that finished eighth in the 4 × 200 m freestyle relay final.

At the 2010 French Championship, in Saint-Raphäel, she won gold in both the 200 m individual medley event and the 400 m individual medley event, finishing second to Coralie Balmy in the 200 m freestyle event. At the European Championships in Budapest, Muffat arrived as the favourite to take gold at the 200 m individual medley, declaring to the press that the gold medal is her objective in that event. However, after leading the field into the third discipline of the medley, the breaststroke, she was overtaken by Hungarian Katinka Hosszú, causing Muffat to lose momentum and finish fourth in the event. On the same day, the French 4 × 200 m freestyle relay team also finishes second in the final when Muffat, who was anchoring the French relay, got overtaken by another Hungarian swimmer, Evelyn Verrasztó. Two days later, she would also finish 4th in the 200 m freestyle event, which was won by Italian swimmer Federica Pellegrini.

Following her disappointing results, her coach, Fabrice Pellerin, urged Muffat to make a choice between the medley events and the freestyle events. Choosing the latter, Muffat improved her results in freestyle swimming, taking first place in all distances (50 m, 100 m, 200 m and 400 m) at the following French Championships, at Chartre, where she also broke the French record in the 100 m freestyle event.

A month later, at the 2010 World Short Course Championships in Dubai, Muffat would take her first world title, by winning the 200 m freestyle event, defeating Katie Hoff of the United States and Kylie Palmer of Australia. Swimming with the French 4 × 200 m freestyle relay, she also took a bronze medal from the event.

In 2011, Muffat repeated the feat of winning all four distances (100 m, 200 m, 400 m and 800 m) at the French Championships in Strasbourg, thus also qualifying in all events for that year's World Championships, in Shanghai, China. At the World Championships Muffat took two bronze medals, in the 200 m and the 400 m freestyle events.

=== 2012–2014 ===
In March 2012, at the French Championships in Dunkerque, Muffat won the 400 m freestyle event by breaking Laure Manaudou's French record, established in 2006. Her time of 4:01:13 was the world's fastest of the year at the time, and earned her a berth in that year's Olympic Games. Two days later, Muffat would also win the 200 m freestyle event, breaking her own French record with a time of 1:54:87, thus qualifying for that event as well at the Olympic Games in London.

Muffat qualified to enter three events at the 2012 Summer Olympics in London. She won the gold medal in the 400 m freestyle with a new Olympic record, as well as the silver medal in the 200 m freestyle event. Also, her 4 × 200 m freestyle team won the bronze medal in a time of 7:47.49. [Camille Muffat (1:55.51); Charlotte Bonnet (1:57.78); Ophélie-Cyrielle Étienne (1:58.05); Coralie Balmy (1:56.15)]. She thus equalled Laure Manaudou's 2004 Olympics achievement of one gold, one silver and one bronze, and also became only the third Frenchwoman after Micheline Ostermeyer and Manaudou to win three medals in a single summer or winter Olympic Games.

In April 2013, at the French Championships in Rennes, she won the 400 m freestyle event for a third consecutive time, while also winning the 100 m and 200 m freestyle events, which qualified her for all three events at the 2013 World Championships in Barcelona, Spain.

Her performance at the 2013 World Championships, however, were below expectations, with Muffat taking home the bronze medals, in the 200 m freestyle and the 4 × 200 m freestyle relay. In her signature 400 m freestyle event, however, she finished a disappointing seventh in the final.

After the World Championships, Muffat decided to cut down on her training routine temporarily, and took a gold, a silver and a bronze at the 2013 French Short Course Championships in Dijon. At that year's European Championships, however, she failed to qualify for the 200 m freestyle final, and finished fifth in the 400 m.

At the 2014 French Championships in Chartres, a qualifying event for the 2014 European Championships, Muffat won four titles, taking gold in the 100 m, 200 m and 400 m freestyle, as well as in the 100 m butterfly. She also took silver in the 50 m freestyle.

However, on 12 July 2014, before the European Championships, she announced her retirement from competitive swimming at age 24, during an interview to the French newspaper, L'Équipe.

== Death ==
On 9 March 2015, as a part of a group of sports stars participating in the French reality TV show Dropped, Muffat was killed along with nine other people when two helicopters collided in mid-air during filming in northwestern Argentina. Her funeral was held in a private ceremony in the Church of St. John the Baptist, in Nice, on 25 March, in a joint service with boxer Alexis Vastine, who died in the same accident.

== Earnings, sponsorships and accolades ==
Muffat's agent, Sophie Kamoun, refused to disclose details concerning the income earned by Muffat in commercial endorsements. The French newspaper Le Figaro estimated her earnings for 2013 at almost €500,000.

She signed a sponsorship deal with Électricité de France ahead of the 2012 Olympic Games, and the French Olympic Committee also pays money prizes for athletes earning medals at the games.

On 1 January 2013, Muffat was made a Knight (Chevalier) of the Légion d'honneur.

In November 2015, Muffat was posthumously inducted into the International Swimming Hall of Fame as part of the class of 2016.

== Tribute ==
On 28 October 2026, Google celebrated her 37th birthday with a Google Doodle.

== See also ==
- World record progression 400 metres freestyle
- World record progression 800 metres freestyle
- List of European Short Course Swimming Championships medalists (women)

Records
Preceded by Alessia Filippi	Women's 800 metre freestyle world record holder (short course); 16 November 2012 – 10 August 2013	Succeeded by Mireia Belmonte
Preceded by Joanne Jackson	Women's 400 metre freestyle world record holder (short course); 24 November 2012 – 11 August 2013	Succeeded by Mireia Belmonte
Awards and achievements
Preceded by Nikola Karabatić (Sportsperson of the Year)	French Sportswoman of the Year; 2012	Succeeded by Marion Bartoli
