= Villa Castelli, Argentina =

Villa Castelli
- Town
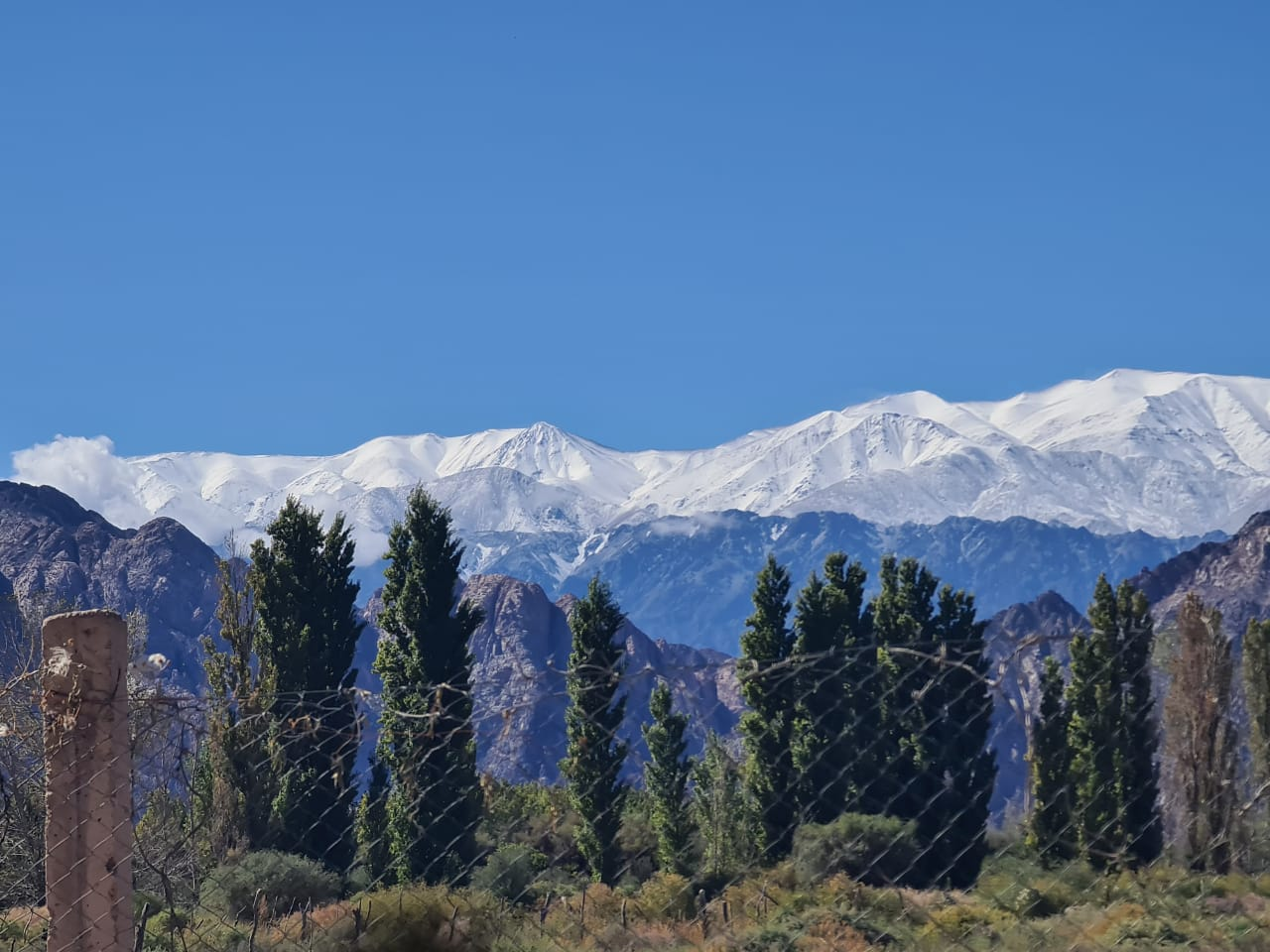

- Location within Argentina
- Coordinates: 29°1′5″S 68°13′37″W
- Country: Argentina
- Province: La Rioja
- Department: General Lamadrid

Population (2010)
  - Total: 1,697
- Time zone: UTC−3 (ART)

Villa Castelli is a small town and seat of the General Lamadrid Department in the Province of La Rioja, northwestern Argentina. As of 2010 it had a population of 1,697.

Around 140 km (87 mi) west of the city of La Rioja, it is at the foot of the Sierra de Famatina, and the Vichina River flows in the vicinity.

In March 2015, a helicopter collision in the town killed ten people, including French athletes Florence Arthaud, Camille Muffat and Alexis Vastine.
