= Alexis Vastine =

French boxer (1986–2015)

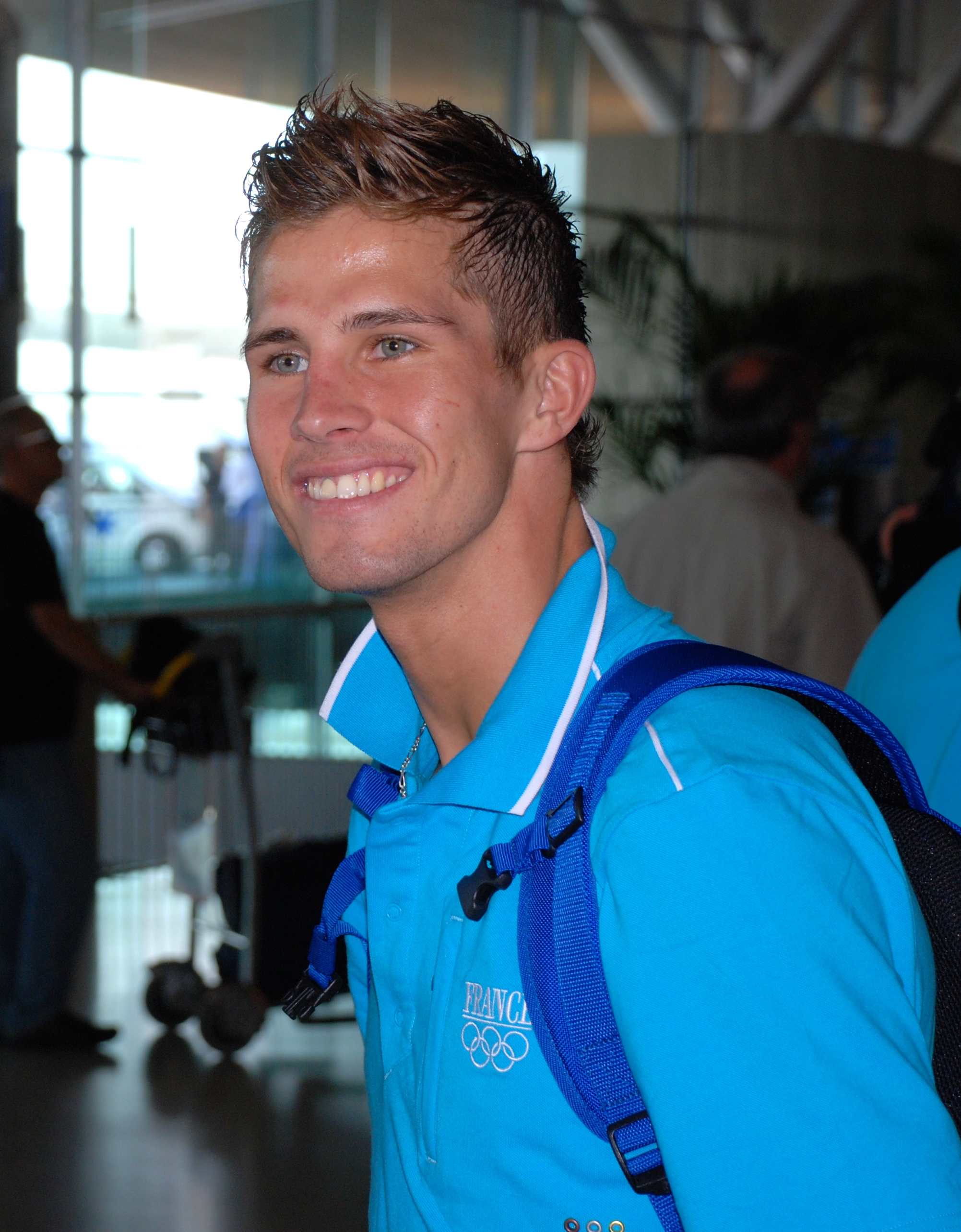
- Vastine in 2008

Personal information
- Born: 17 November 1986 Pont-Audemer, France
- Died: 9 March 2015 (aged 28) Villa Castelli, La Rioja, Argentina
- Height: 1.84 m (6 ft 0 in)
Medal record
Men's boxing
Representing France
Olympic Games
Bronze medal – third place	2008 Beijing	Light Welterweight
European Amateur Championships
Silver medal – second place	2010 Moscow	Welterweight
Mediterranean Games
Gold medal – first place	2009 Pescara	Light Welterweight

Alexis Vastine (17 November 1986 – 9 March 2015) was a French boxer who won a bronze medal at the 2008 Summer Olympics in the Light Welterweight division. He also competed in the 2012 Summer Olympics, where he was eliminated in the quarterfinals in a controversial decision. He died in the Villa Castelli helicopter collision during the filming of French TV reality show Dropped for the TF1 network.

== Career ==
At the 2004 junior world championships, Vastine was knocked out by Britain's Amir Khan at lightweight and won bronze.

At the 2007 senior world championships in Chicago, he was outpointed by Britain's Bradley Saunders at junior welter but qualified for the Olympics.

At the 2008 Olympics, Vastine reached the semifinal where he faced Manuel Félix Díaz from the Dominican Republic. With Vastine leading by two in the final round, the Dominican fighter made a comeback and won the fight. Vastine lost the match by two points after being penalised twice by the referee, having four points deducted from his score. France 24 reported:

Vastine was robbed of his place in the final as he went down 12–10 due to a pair of two-point penalties. Vastine, who stood a full seven inches over his opponent, was largely in control throughout but was harshly penalised for pushing his opponent down, not just once but twice. Diaz was also fortunate to score on a number of wild haymakers that didn't look to have connected cleanly.

The Agence France-Presse described the referee's ruling as "controversial". Diaz, however, went on to win the gold medal.

Vastine went on to suffer what was widely seen as an unjust decision at the 2012 Olympics in London, where he drew on points but lost on countback to top-seeded welterweight Taras Shelestyuk of Ukraine in the quarter-finals, thus missing out on a medal.

=== Olympic games results ===
2008 (as a Light welterweight)

- Defeated Egidijus Kavaliauskas (Lithuania) 13–2
- Defeated Bradley Saunders (Great Britain) 11–7
- Defeated Uranchimegiin Mönkh-Erdene (Mongolia) 12–4
- Lost to Manuel Félix Díaz (Dominican Republic) 10–12

2012 (as a Welterweight)

- Defeated Patrick Wojcicki (Germany) 16-12
- Defeated Byambyn Tüvshinbat (Mongolia) 13-12
- Lost to Taras Shelestyuk (Ukraine) 18+-18

=== World amateur championships results ===
2007 (as a Light welterweight)

- Defeated Dilshod Mahmudov (Uzbekistan) 28–27
- Defeated Edward Akora (Uganda) RSCO 3
- Defeated Vasili Belous (Moldava) 27–10
- Lost to Bradley Saunders (England) 13–30

== Death ==
On 9 March 2015, as part of a group of French sports stars participating in a reality TV show called Dropped, Vastine was one of 10 people who died when two helicopters collided mid-air during filming near Villa Castelli in northwestern Argentina. His 21-year-old sister Célie, also an amateur boxer, had been killed in a car accident in France just two months before.

== Honours and awards ==
- Chevalier of the Ordre National du Mérite
- National Defence Medal
