= Cel shading =

Computer graphics rendering technique used to mimic the look of 2D animation

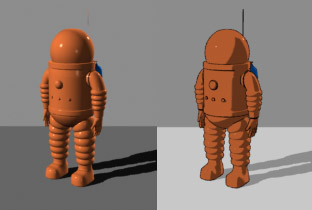
A 3D model of a spacesuit (left) edited to use a basic cel shader, also known as a toon shader, and border detection (right)

Graphics complex of a seashell with toon shading modeled in Mathematica 13.1

Cel shading or toon shading is a type of non-photorealistic rendering designed to make 3D computer graphics appear to be flat and hand-drawn by using shade gradient or tints and shades instead of shading colors. A cel shader is often used to mimic the style of a comic book or a cartoon and/or give the render a characteristic paper-like texture. There are similar techniques that can make an image look like a sketch, an oil painting or an ink painting. Though the end result of cel-shading has a very simplistic feel like that of hand-drawn animation, the process is complex. The name comes from cels (short for celluloid), clear sheets of acetate which are painted on for use in traditional 2D animation.

== Basic process ==
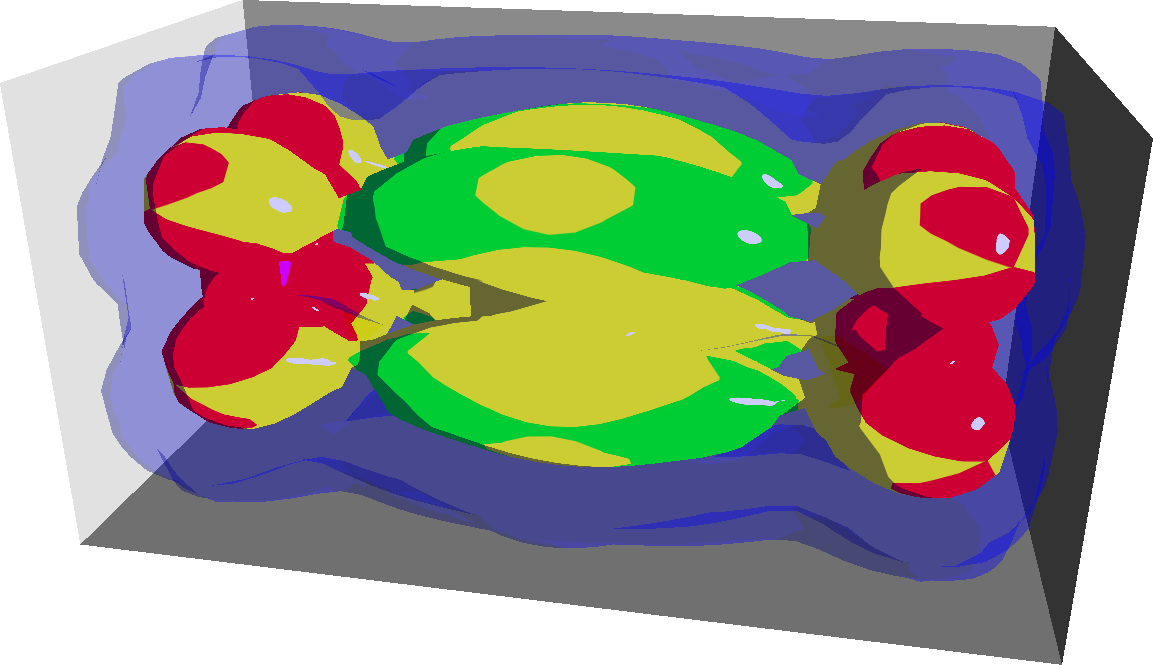
Cel-shaded rendering of two isosurfaces of the probability density of a particle in a box

The cel-shading process starts with a typical 3D model. Where cel-shading differs from conventional rendering is in its non-photorealistic shading algorithm. Conventional smooth lighting values are calculated for each pixel and then quantized to a small number of discrete shades to create the characteristic "flat look", where the shadows and highlights appear as blocks of color rather than being smoothly mixed in a gradient.

== Outlines ==
=== Wireframe method ===
Black ink outlines and contour lines can be created using a variety of methods. One popular method is to first render a black outline, slightly larger than the object itself. Back-face culling is inverted and the back-facing triangles are drawn in black. To dilate the silhouette, these back-faces may be drawn in wireframe multiple times with slight changes in translation. Alternatively, back-faces may be rendered solid-filled, with their vertices translated along their vertex normals in a vertex shader. After drawing the outline, back-face culling is set back to normal to draw the shading and optional textures of the object. Finally, the image is composited via Z-buffering, as the back-faces always lie deeper in the scene than the front-faces. The result is that the object is drawn with a black outline and interior contour lines. The term "cel-shading" is popularly used to refer to the application of this "ink" outlining process in animation and games, although originally the term referred to the flat shading technique regardless of whether the outline was applied.

The Utah teapot rendered using cel shading:

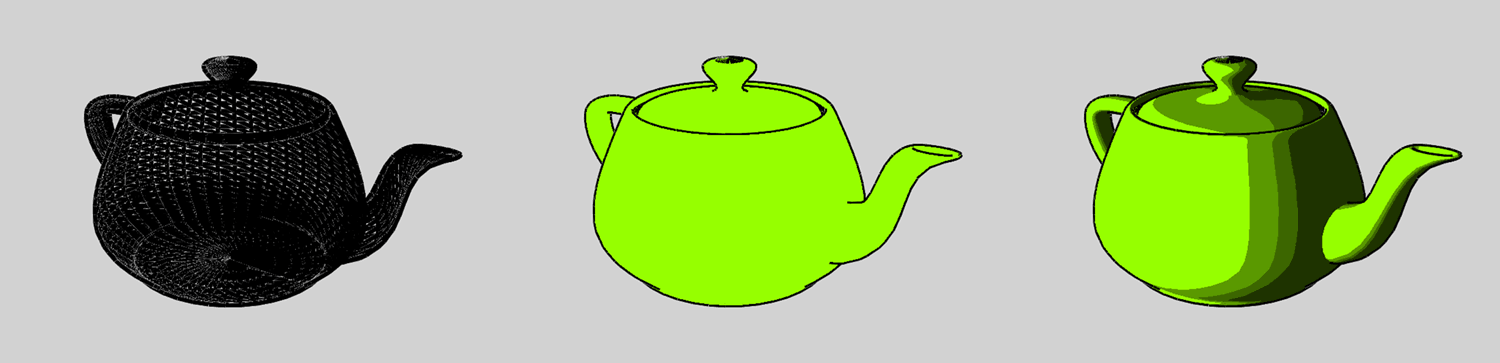

1. The back faces are drawn with thick lines
2. The object faces are drawn using a single color
3. Shading is applied

Steps 2 and 3 can be combined using multitexturing (part of texture mapping).

=== Edge-detection method ===
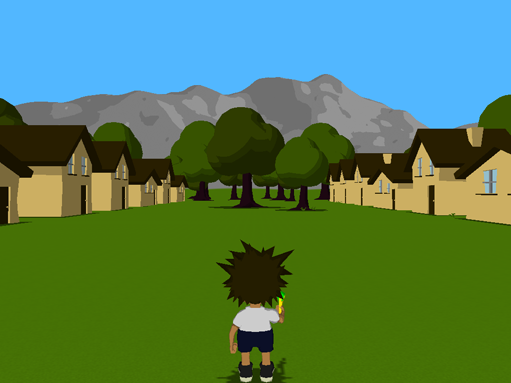
1. The scene is rendered with cel shading to a screen-sized color texture.

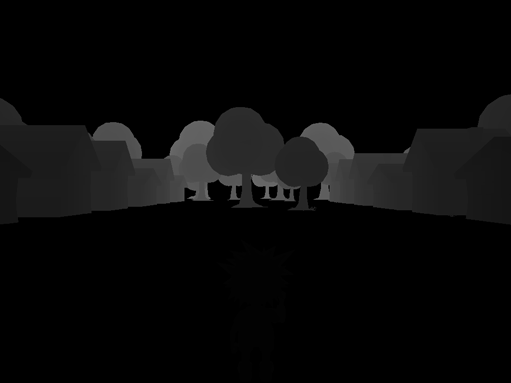
2. Depth information of the scene is rendered to a screen-sized texture.

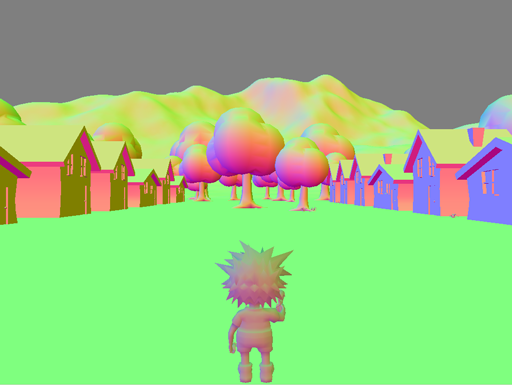
3. World-space surface normals are rendered as a screen-sized texture.

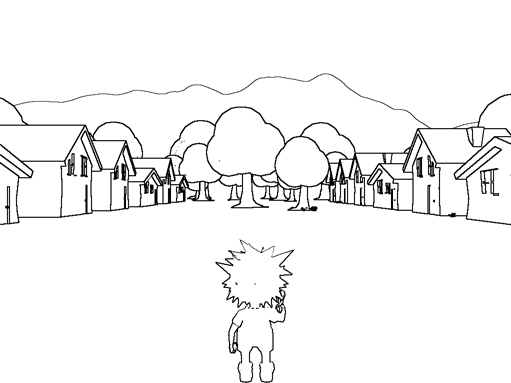
4. A Sobel filter or similar edge-detection filter is applied to the normal and depth textures to generate an edge texture. Texels on detected edges are black, while all other texels are white.

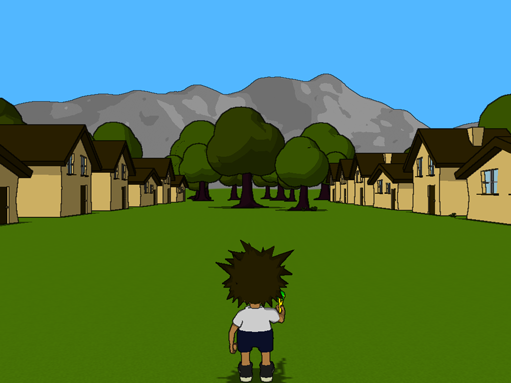
5. The edge texture (4) and the color texture (1) are composited to produce the final rendered image.

== In video games ==
The Dreamcast game Jet Set Radio, revealed at the 1999 Tokyo Game Show, drew media attention for its cel-shaded style. It used cel-shading for its characters and its vibrant visual style has had a lasting influence on the use of cel-shading in video games. Since the early 2000s, many notable video games have made use of this style, such as Cel Damage (2001), The Legend of Zelda: The Wind Waker (2002) and Ōkami (2006).

Cel shading, in contrast to other visual styles such as photorealism, is often used to lend a more artistic or fantastical element to a video game's environment. In developing Ōkami, director Hideki Kamiya described his vision for the game's graphics: "I wanted to create a game with the natural beauty of the Japanese countryside... to make a world that was glistening and beautiful." Producer Atsushi Inaba recalls in a 2004 interview that Clover Studios had "abandoned the realistic style" for Ōkami as they became inspired by traditional Japanese art.

Game studios might choose a style such as cel shading in their development for reasons beyond artistic vision. Cel shaded graphics are usually simple in visual information, which can be useful in some applications. In the case of The Legend of Zelda: The Wind Waker, developer Satoru Takizawa states that using this style allowed to "represent the mechanisms and objects for puzzles [in The Wind Waker] in a more easy-to-understand way." Takizawa also argues that photorealistic graphics, in contrast, would have "had the adverse effect of making information difficult to represent game-wise."

== Examples of cel-shading in media ==
=== Film ===
- The Great Mouse Detective, a 1986 American animated film based on "Basil of Baker Street" by Eve Titus and Paul Galdone.
- Technological Threat, a 1988 American animated short made by Brian Jennings and Bill Kroyer and was produced by Kroyer Films.
- Oliver & Company, a 1988 American animated musical adventure film based on the Charles Dickens novel Oliver Twist.
- The Little Mermaid, a 1989 American animated musical fantasy film based on the 1837 Danish fairy tale of the same name by Hans Christian Andersen.
- DuckTales the Movie: Treasure of the Lost Lamp, a 1990 American animated adventure fantasy film based on the animated television series DuckTales.
- FernGully: The Last Rainforest, a 1992 animated musical fantasy film directed by Bill Kroyer in his feature directorial debut.
- Tom and Jerry: The Movie, a 1992 American animated musical comedy film based on the characters Tom and Jerry created by William Hanna and Joseph Barbera.
- The Lion King, a 1994 American animated musical coming-of-age drama film produced by Walt Disney Feature Animation and released by Walt Disney Pictures.
- Felidae, a 1994 German adult animated mystery film directed by Michael Schaack, written by Martin Kluger, Stefaan Schieder and Akif Pirinçci, and based on Pirinçci's 1989 novel of the same name.
- The Rugrats Movie (1998)
- Tarzan, a 1999 American animated adventure film based on the 1912 story "Tarzan of the Apes" by Edgar Rice Burroughs.
- The Iron Giant, a 1999 American animated science-fiction film directed by Brad Bird and based on the 1968 novel The Iron Man by Ted Hughes.
- Fantasia 2000, a 1999 American animated musical anthology film.
- Titan A.E. (2000)
- The Adventures of Rocky and Bullwinkle (2000)
- Help! I'm a Fish, a 2000 Danish-German-Irish traditionally animated science fantasy musical film.
- Rugrats in Paris: The Movie (2000)
- The Land Before Time VII: The Stone of Cold Fire, a 2000 American direct-to-video animated adventure musical drama and the seventh film in The Land Before Time series, produced and directed by Charles Grosvenor.
- Osmosis Jones, a 2001 American live action/animated buddy cop comedy film.
- The Little Polar Bear, a 2001 German animated film based on Hans de Beer books.
- Spirit: Stallion of the Cimarron, a 2002 American animated Western film.
- Lilo & Stitch, a 2002 American animated science-fiction comedy-drama film.
- Hey Arnold!: The Movie (2002)
- Treasure Planet a 2002 American animated science-fiction adventure film.
- Rugrats Go Wild (2003)
- Scary Godmother: Halloween Spooktakular, a 2003 Canadian animated television special produced by Mainframe Entertainment and based on a stage adaptation of the first entry in the Scary Godmother series of books by Jill Thompson.
- Stitch! The Movie, a 2003 American direct-to-video animated science fiction comedy film
- Brother Bear, a 2003 American animated musical fantasy comedy-drama film.
- Hot Wheels: World Race, a 2003 animated direct-to-video film.
- The Lion King 1½, a 2004 American animated direct-to-video musical comedy film directed by Bradley Raymond, produced by Disneytoon Studios and released on February 10, 2004. The third installment in the Lion King trilogy, the film is both a prequel and sidequel to The Lion King (1994), focusing on the supporting characters Timon and Pumbaa. A majority of the voice cast from the first film returns to reprise their roles, including Nathan Lane and Ernie Sabella as the voices of Timon and Pumbaa, respectively. The film's structure is inspired by Tom Stoppard's Rosencrantz and Guildenstern Are Dead, a tragicomedy that tells the story of Hamlet from the point of view of two minor characters. The Lion King 1½ received generally positive reviews from critics.
- Appleseed, a 2004 Japanese animated film.
- Mickey, Donald, Goofy: The Three Musketeers, a 2004 American animated direct-to-video musical adventure film based on the film adaptations of the 1844 novel The Three Musketeers by Alexandre Dumas and the Mickey Mouse film series by Walt Disney and Ub Iwerks.
- Lilo & Stitch 2: Stitch Has a Glitch, a 2005 American direct-to-video animated science fiction comedy-drama film produced by the Australian office of Disneytoon Studios.
- Kakurenbo, a 2005 Japanese anime short film written and directed by Shuhei Morita.
- Scary Godmother: The Revenge of Jimmy (2005)
- Stuart Little 3: Call of the Wild, a 2005 American animated comedy film.
- Curious George (2006)
- Leroy & Stitch, a 2006 American animated science fiction comedy television film produced by Walt Disney Television Animation.
- Renaissance (2006)
- The Simpsons Movie, a 2007 American animated comedy film based on the Fox animated sitcom The Simpsons by Matt Groening.
- Fear(s) of the Dark, a 2007 French black-and-white animated horror anthology film written and directed by several notable comic book creators and graphic designers.
- Garfield Gets Real (also known as Garfield 3D in some regions), a 2007 American animated adventure comedy film based on the comic strip Garfield.
- Nak (2008)
- Logorama, a 2009 French adult animated satirical short film produced by the French graphic design and animation studio H5 as their first and only cinematic project.
- Laura's Star and the Mysterious Dragon Nian (2009)
- Tangled, a 2010 American animated musical fantasy comedy film produced by Walt Disney Animation Studios and loosely based on the German fairy tale Rapunzel in the collection of folktales published by the Brothers Grimm.
- The Prodigies (2011)
- Laura's Star and the Dream Monsters (2011)
- The Painting (2011)
- Padak (2012)
- Arjun: The Warrior Prince, a 2012 Indian animated action film.
- Paperman, a 2012 American black-and-white computer-cel animated short film.
- Sofia the First: Once Upon a Princess (2012)
- The Lost 15 Boys: The Big Adventure on Pirates' Island, a 2013 animated adventure film directed by Xiaohan, Mao Qichao, Ba Yunfeng, Zhang Bing and Ryūtarō Nakamura, based on the novel Two Years' Vacation by Jules Verne.
- The Dam Keeper, a 2014 American animated short film directed by Robert Kondo and Daisuke Tsutsumi.
- Team Hot Wheels: The Origin of Awesome! (2014)
- Feast, a 2014 American 2D/3D hybrid animated romantic comedy short film.
- Khail Girban's The Prophet, a 2014 computer cel animated film.
- Jungle Shuffle (2014)
- The Peanuts Movie (2015)
- Seoul Station (2016)
- Louise by the Shore (2016)
- Rabbit School: Guardians of the Golden Egg, a 2017 German animated adventure comedy film directed by Ute von Münchow-Pohl from the screenplay by Katja Grübel and Dagmar Rehbinder, based on the 1924 German children's novel Die Häschenschule (A Day At Bunny School), written by Albert Sixtus and illustrated by Fritz Koch-Gotha.
- Zombillenium, a 2017 animated film directed by Arthur de Pins and Alexis Ducord, based on the comic series of the same name.
- Mutafukaz: Operation Blackhead, a 2017 crime short film that became the basis for the comic book for the same name produced by Run.
- Batman Ninja (2018)
- White Fang (2018)
- Underdog (2018)
- Dilili in Paris (2018)
- Pachamama (2018)
- Spider-Man: Into the Spider-Verse (2018)
- The Bears' Famous Invasion of Sicily (2019)
- I Lost My Body, a 2019 French adult animated fantasy drama film directed by Jérémy Clapin, based on the novel Happy Hand by Guillaume Laurant.
- Raggie (2020)
- Tom & Jerry (2021)
- The SpongeBob Movie: Sponge on the Run (2021)
- The Mitchells vs. the Machines (2021)
- Vivo (2021)
- Far from the Tree, a 2021 American animated short film written and directed by Natalie Nourigat and produced by Ruth Strother.
- Opal (2021)
- Eternal Spring (2022)
- The Bad Guys (2022)
- Chip 'n Dale: Rescue Rangers (2022)
- Entergalactic (2022)
- Batman and Superman: Battle of the Super Sons (2022)
- Puss in Boots: The Last Wish (2022)
- Justice League x RWBY: Super Heroes & Huntsmen (2023)
- Spider-Man: Across the Spider-Verse (2023)
- Mujib Bhai (2023)
- Nimona (2023)
- Teenage Mutant Ninja Turtles: Mutant Mayhem, a 2023 animated superhero film directed by Jeff Rowe, co-directed by Kyler Spears and based on the Teenage Mutant Ninja Turtles characters created by Peter Laird and Kevin Eastman.
- Babylon 5: The Road Home (2023)
- Once Upon a Studio, a 2023 American live-action/animated fantasy comedy crossover short film.
- Mars Express, a 2023 French animated science fiction thriller film directed by Jérémie Périn, and Périn's first feature film.
- Wish, a 2023 American animated musical film.
- The Casagrandes Movie (2024)
- Big City Greens the Movie: Spacecation, a 2024 American animated science fiction musical comedy film directed by Anna O'Brian and based on the Disney Channel animated television series Big City Greens, created by The Houghton Brothers.
- Ultraman: Rising (2024)
- Watchmen (2024)
- The Wild Robot (2024)
- Benjamin Bat (2024)
- Flow (2024)
- Dog Man (2025)
- Batman Ninja vs. Yakuza League (2025)
- Predator: Killer of Killers (2025)
- Allah Is Not Obliged (2025)
- KPop Demon Hunters (2025)
- Smurfs (2025)
- The Bad Guys 2 (2025)
- Scarlet (2025)
- Goat (2026)
- Coyote vs. Acme (2026)
- Forgotten Island (2026)
- The Cat in the Hat (2026)

=== Television ===
- TaleSpin - an American animated television series first aired in 1990 as a preview on Disney Channel and later that year as part of The Disney Afternoon.
- Mighty Ducks - a 1996 American animated television series.
- Silver Surfer - a 1998 American-Canadian animated television series, based on the Marvel Comics superhero, the Silver Surfer, created by Stan Lee and Jack Kirby.
- Fun Song Factory - a 1998 British television series produced by Tell-Tale Productions.
- Family Guy - a 1999 American animated sitcom created by Seth MacFarlane for the Fox Broadcasting Company.
- Futurama - a 1999 American animated science fiction sitcom created by Matt Groening for the Fox Broadcasting Company and later revived by Comedy Central, and then Hulu.
- Tweenies - a 1999 British television series produced by Tell-Tale Productions.
- Twipsy - a 1999 German-Spanish animated television series produced for Der Kinderkanal, based on the official mascot of the same name by the Spanish designer Javier Mariscal.
- NASCAR Racers - a 1999 American-Canadian animated television series produced for Fox Kids.
- The Fairly OddParents - a 2001 American animated comedy series created by Butch Hartman for Nickelodeon.
- Invader Zim - a 2001 American animated science fiction horror comedy series created by Jhonen Vasquez for Nickelodeon.
- Finger Tips - a 2001 British children's television series that aired on CITV and was broadcast from 3 September 2001 to 14 December 2008. It was produced by The Foundation.
- Pecola - a 2001 Canadian-Japanese animated children's television series produced by Yomiko Advertising, Nelvana, and Milky Cartoon and based on the series of children's picture books by Naomi Iwata.
- Funky Cops - a 2002 French animated television series created by Thierry Sapyn for M6.
- Albie - a 2002 British animated children's television series created by Andy Cutbill for CITV.
- Spider-Man: The New Animated Series - a 2003 Canadian-American television series produced by Mainframe Entertainment, Marvel Enterprises, Adelaide Productions, and Sony Pictures Television
- Boo! - a 2003 British television series produced by Tell-Tale Productions
- Duck Dodgers - a 2003 American animated science fiction comedy series produced by Warner Bros. Television Animation.
- Lilo & Stitch - a 2003 American animated television series produced by Walt Disney Television Animation
- Atomic Betty - a 2004 French-Canadian animated television series produced by Atomic Cartoons, Breakthrough Entertainment, and Tele Images Kids, along with Marathon Group joining for the third season.
- Dragon Booster - a 2004 Canadian television series produced by Nerd Corps Entertainment
- American Dad! - a 2005 American animated sitcom co-created by Seth MacFarlane for the Fox Broadcasting Company.
- Firehouse Tales - a 2005 American animated children's television series created by Sidney J. Bailey for Cartoon Network's now-defunct Tickle-U preschool programming block.
- A.T.O.M. - a 2005 French superhero animated television series produced by SIP Animation in association with Jetix Europe.
- Skyland - a 2005 French-Canadian animated television series produced by Method Films and 9 Story Entertainment
- Class of the Titans - a 2005 Canadian animated television series produced by Studio B Productions and Nelvana.
- Kappa Mikey - a 2006 American animated comedy television series created by Larry Schwarz for Nicktoons Network.
- Galactik Football - a 2006 French animated television series created by Augias Imaginaction.
- Ōban Star-Racers (also known as Molly, Star-Racer as a short movie) - a 2006 French-Japanese animated television series created by Savin Yeatman-Eiffel of Sav! The World Productions in association with Hal Film Maker, Pumpkin 3D, and Jetix Europe.
- Team Galaxy - a 2006 French-Italian-Canadian science fiction action animated television series produced by Marathon Media, Image Entertainment Corporation, France 3, Rai Fiction, and Jetix Europe in association with YTV.
- Handy Manny - a 2006 American-Canadian children's television series produced by Nelvana
- Jim Jam and Sunny - a 2006 British television series produced by Wish Films.
- Z-Squad - a 2006 South Korean-Canadian magical girl television series produced by Enemes, SBS, Daiwon C&A Holdings, Nelvana, and SOVIK
- The Land Before Time - a 2007 American animated television series, based on The Land Before Time film series created by Judy Freudberg and Tony Geiss
- Phineas & Ferb - a 2007 American animated series created by Dan Povenmire and Jeff "Swampy" Marsh for Disney Channel, Disney XD, and eventually Disney+.
- Storm Hawks - a 2007 Canadian television series produced by Nerd Corps Entertainment
- Freefonix - a 2008 British-French-Indian animated children's television series created by Magnus Fiennes, Alex Tate and Simeon Warburton and produced by Cinnamon Entertainment, Toonz Animation-Trivandrum and Method Films for CBBC, in association with Isle of Man Film.
- Speed Racer: The Next Generation - a 2008 American animated television series, based on the classic Japanese Speed Racer franchise by Tatsuo Yoshida.
- The Drinky Crow Show - 2008 American adult animated television series created by Eric Kaplan and Tony Millionaire for Adult Swim, based on the comic strip Maakies.
- Zeke's Pad - 2008 Canadian-Australian animated television series produced by Bardel Entertainment, Flying Bark Productions, Star Farm Productions, and Leaping Lizard Productions for YTV and Seven Network.
- League of Super Evil - a 2009 Canadian television series produced by Nerd Corps Entertainment
- Bunny Maloney - a 2009 French animated television series produced by MoonScoop Group, France 2, and Telegael
- Iron Man: Armored Adventures - a 2009 French-American television series produced by Marvel Animation
- Hot Wheels Battle Force 5 - a 2009 American-Canadian television series produced by Nerd Corps Entertainment and Nelvana
- Alphablocks - a 2010 British animated children's television series for preschoolers created by Joe Elliot for CBeebies.
- Regular Show - a 2010 American animated series created by J.G. Quintel for Cartoon Network.
- Mongo Wrestling Alliance - a 2011 American adult animated comedy television series created by Metalocalypse co-creator Tommy Blacha for Adult Swim.
- Voltron Force - a 2011 Canadian-American animated television series produced for Nicktoons and serving as the sequel to the 1980s animated series Voltron and the 1999 CGI series Voltron: The Third Dimension.
- Rated A for Awesome - a 2011 Canadian television series produced by Nerd Corps Entertainment
- Justin Time (also known as Justin Time Go! in season 3) - a 2011 Canadian animated children's television series produced by Guru Studio.
- Tron: Uprising - a 2012 American animated science fiction television series produced by Disney Television Animation.
- Gravity Falls - a 2012 American mystery comedy animated television series created by Alex Hirsch for Disney Channel and Disney XD.
- Slugterra - a 2012 Canadian television series produced by Nerd Corps Entertainment
- Vary Peri - a 2012 Korean-Chinese animated television series based on the character created by InfinityOne Comics Entertainment, animated by Alpha Group Company in China and CJ E&M in South Korea.
- Sofia the First - a 2013 American animated fantasy children's television series produced by Disney Television Animation.
- Max Steel - a 2013 American-Canadian television series produced by Nerd Corps Entertainment and Mattel.
- RWBY - a 2013 American animated web series created by Monty Oum for Rooster Teeth.
- Calimero - a 2013 French-Italian-Japanese animated television series produced by Gaumont Animation and TeamTO.
- Lassie - a 2014 French-American-German animated television series based on the classic character by Eric Knight.
- Last Week Tonight with John Oliver - a 2014 American late-night talk and news satire television series produced by HBO - Episode 7: Immigration Reform
- Transformers: Robots in Disguise - a 2015 American science-fiction animated television series produced by Hasbro Studios and Darby Pop Productions for Cartoon Network.
- Alvinnn!!! and the Chipmunks - a French-American animated musical comedy television series created by Janice Karman.
- The Long Long Holiday - a 2015 French animated television series produced by Les Armateurs and Blue Spirit Animation.
- Regal Academy - a 2016 Italian television series produced by Rainbow S.p.A.
- Voltron: Legendary Defender - a 2016 American animated mecha television series produced by DreamWorks Television Animation, World Events Productions, and Studio Mir for Netflix and serving as a reboot of the Voltron franchise and Japanese anime series Beast King GoLion.
- Heroes of Envell - a 2017 Russian animated television series created by Parovoz Studio.
- Rocket & Groot - a 2017 American short-lived animated television series based on the comics published by Marvel Comics.
- Spirit: Riding Free - a 2017 American animated television series produced by DreamWorks Animation Television for Netflix, based on the 2002 Oscar-nominated animated film, Spirit: Stallion of the Cimarron, and the first series in the Spirit franchise.
- Lilybuds - a 2018 French-British animated children's television series produced by Zodiak Kids Studio France.
- Disenchantment - a 2018 American animated satirical fantasy sitcom created by Matt Groening for Netflix.
- Denver, the Last Dinosaur - a 2018 French-American animated television series produced by Zagtoon and Method Animation for M6. It is a reboot of the original series of the same name.
- The Dragon Prince - a 2018 American-Canadian animated fantasy television series created by Aaron Ehasz and Justin Richmond for Netflix.
- Star Wars Resistance - a 2018 American television series produced by Lucasfilm Animation
- Pucca: Love Recipe - a 2018 South Korean animated comedy television series produced by Bazooka Studio, based on the Pucca franchise created by the South Korean company VOOZ Character System.
- Gen:Lock - 2019 American adult animated science fiction television series created by Gray Haddock for Netflix.
- Love, Death & Robots - a 2019 American Adult animated anthology series produced by Blur Studio for Netflix
- Lego City Adventures - a 2019 Danish-American animated television series, based on the long-running Lego City toyline theme.
- Gigantosaurus - a 2019 French-Canadian animated children's television series, based on the book by Jonny Duddle.
- Close Enough - a 2020 American adult animated sitcom created by J.G. Quintel for HBO Max.
- What If...? - a 2021 Marvel Studios alternate history television series set in the Marvel Cinematic Universe
- Sharkdog - a 2021 Singaporean-American animated children's television series created by Singaporean artist Jacinth Tan Yi Ting for Netflix.
- Arcane - a 2021 French-American adult animated steampunk action-adventure television series created by Christian Linke and Alex Yee. It was produced by the French animation studio Fortiche
- Smiling Friends - a 2022 Australian-American adult animated sitcom co-created by Michael Cusack and Zach Hadel for Adult Swim.
- Super Giant Robot Brothers - a 2022 Indian-American animated adventure television series created by Victor Maldonado and Alfredo Torres for Netflix.
- The Wingfeather Saga - a 2022 American animated television series based on the book series of the same name by singer-songwriter Andrew Peterson.
- Gremlins - a 2023 American animated fantasy adventure horror comedy television series produced by Warner Bros. Animation for HBO Max and based on the film of the same name by Joe Dante and Chris Columbus.
- Curses! - a 2023 American animated adventure television series produced by DreamWorks Animation Television for Apple TV+.
- Blue Eye Samurai - a 2023 French-American adult animated action television series created by Michael Green and Amber Noizumi for Netflix.
- X-Men '97 - a 2024 American animated television series created by Beau DeMayo for the streaming service Disney+, based on the Marvel Comics superhero team the X-Men.
- The Fairly OddParents: A New Wish - a 2024 American animated television series based on and serving as a sequel to the Nickelodeon animated series The Fairly OddParents, created by Butch Hartman.
- Your Friendly Neighborhood Spider-Man - a 2025 American animated television series created by Jeff Trammell for the streaming service Disney+, based on the Marvel Comics character Spider-Man.
- Belfort & Lupin - a 2025 French animated television series created by Teddy J. Stehly and directed by Philippe Vidal.
- Eyes of Wakanda - a 2025 American adult animated anthology television miniseries created by Todd Harris for the streaming service Disney+, based on the Marvel Comics country Wakanda.
- Weather Hunters - a 2025 American animated children's television series produced by Al Roker Entertainment and Silver Creek Falls Entertainment for PBS Kids.
- Marvel Zombies - a 2025 American adult animated television series created by Bryan Andrews and Zeb Wells for the streaming service Disney+, based on the Marvel Studios series of the same name.
- The Marsupilamis - a 2026 French-Belgian animated television series produced by Ellipse Animation and Belvision Studios for Nickelodeon and based on the comic series Marsupilami by André Franquin.
- Stranger Things: Tales from '85 - a 2026 American animated science fiction television series and a spin-off of Netflix's Stranger Things.

== See also ==
- 2.5D
- Gooch shading
- Low poly
