= Felidae (disambiguation) =

Felidae is the biological family of all cats.

Felidae may also refer to:

- Felidae (novel), a novel by Akif Pirinçci.
- Felidae (film), a 1994 animated film based on the novel.
