= List of Code Lyoko: Evolution episodes =

This is a list of episodes for the French teen drama science fiction television series, Code Lyoko: Evolution created by Thomas Romain and Tania Palumbo and produced by the MoonScoop Group for France Télévisions, Lagardère Thématiques and M6, in association with Sofica Cofanim and Backup Media. It is a live-action reboot of the French animated television series Code Lyoko, produced by the French company MoonScoop Group, that first aired in 2013.

== Episodes ==
Evolution is:

- Set one year after the events of the animated series
- the Ice Sector and Forest Sector are lost due to the long period of inactivity of the Supercomputer. It has not been confirmed whether Jeremy will restore the Ice Sector and Forest Sector or not; towers are now black and rectangular and partially open when activated
- Monsters explode into red metallic particles instead of emitting a bright white light
- William Dunbar is welcomed back as the fifth Lyoko Warrior. His Lyoko attire is still black, like when he was serving under XANA
- While Ulrich and William retain all of their powers from the original series with a few differences in appearance, Yumi is never seen using her slightly enhanced telekinesis nor Odd his purple energy "Shield", long-lost "future flash" ability nor his one-time teleportation or Ulrich's triangulation.
- Yumi is given an additional weapon: a Bo staff, though not used as much as her Tessen fans.
- Odd can now summon an additional pair of gloves on top of his paw-like ones that shoot six laser arrows as opposed to just one
- Ulrich, Odd and Yumi are now capable of deactivating towers due to the source codes implanted in their bodies by XANA
- An additional enemy makes himself known: a scientist named Lowell Tyron, who was a member of Project Carthage alongside Waldo Franz Schaeffer, later known as Franz Hopper
- Professor Tyron has his own supercomputer generating a virtual world named the Cortex. The last remaining trace of XANA is hiding within the Cortex, so the Lyoko Warriors must destroy the Cortex in order to finish XANA off for good
- Jeremy programs an adaptable vehicle to travel in the Cortex called "the Megapod" with Odd as the driver
- In additional to XANA's monsters, the five Lyoko Warriors battle Ninjas, which are Tyron's subordinates wearing special suits that allow them to control virtual avatars in the Cortex
- Aelita's long-lost mother, Anthea Hopper, is revealed to be very much alive and has been living in Switzerland as Professor Lowell Tyron's wife for the last four years. Unfortunately, she is completely oblivious that she has been manipulated by her ambitious second husband and of the existence of XANA She was led to believe that her only child had died.
- Girl genius Laura Gauthier temporarily joins the group to help Jeremy create a virus great enough to destroy the Cortex and XANA, but her recklessness ultimately forces them to kick her out of the group and erase her memory.
- Jeremy successfully launches the virus on the Cortex. However, Professor Tyron shuts his supercomputer down before it can fully take effect on XANA, meaning there is a distinct possibility that the rouge multi-agent system still resides within and can be reawakened at any time should Professor Tryon reactivate his supercomputer.

No.	French title English title	Original air date (France)	YouTube release date	Prod. code
1	"XANA 2.0"	19 December 2012 (online); 5 January 2013 (France 4)	29 October 2019	101
Enjoying their normal, thirteen-year-old Jeremy Belpois, fourteen-year-old Ulrich Stern and Odd Della Robia, sixteen-year-old Yumi Ishiyama and 22/23-year-old Aelita Schaeffer soon discover that there is trouble still brewing at Kadic Academy. Even worse, the five best friends discover that their old enemy XANA is somehow back as a highly evolved and modified version of itself. In a side story, Ulrich tries to tell Yumi how he has really felt about her all along. However Yumi's enduring platonic friendship with William Dunbar plays on his doubts yet again. XANA now wants to take back its full power - Source codes that were implanted in the electromagnetic parts of the bodies of the four dutiful Lyoko Warriors during the time of its assumed annihilation one year ago, with Jeremy's own multi-agent program, in order to gain control over the world network once again. The endless war against XANA is far from over, and Jeremy and the Lyoko Warriors are back in action to secretly ensure the survival of humankind.
2	"Cortex" "The Cortex"	5 January 2013	30 October 2019	102
After successfully reprogramming the Skidbladnir Submarine, Jeremy and the four other Lyoko Warriors discover another Replika in the Digital Sea called the Cortex. They intend to learn more about this mysterious, ever-changing sector. Meanwhile, William finds himself partly accepted into the group and aids them in the Cortex. Aelita also finds something very mysterious about her late father - Waldo Schaeffer - in the Cortex's interface.
3	"Spectromania"	5 January 2013	5 November 2019	103
A kid goes up to hug Aelita, then leaves and comes back and does the same to Yumi. Jeremy immediately realizes that XANA has sent a specter to retrieve the codes it implanted in them. So they go to Lyoko and attempt to deactivate the tower in the Desert sector while Odd stays at the school to hold it off, but the situation escalates when Aelita gets hit and is devirtualized. She guides Yumi from Earth, supposing that XANA's source codes can allow the others to deactivate towers. Her theory is correct and Yumi deactivates the tower, only to reveal another one masked by the first's signal; another specter is somewhere on Earth.
4	"Madame Einstein" "Lady Einstein"	19 January 2013	12 November 2019	104
A new, highly intelligent and gifted teenage girl named Laura Gauthier tries to join the quintet at Kadic Academy. She humiliates Jeremy by correcting his mistakes on a complex exercise in class. Aelita suddenly is resentful and suspicious of this new girl, who seems to want to discover their secret. Meanwhile, Jeremy informs his four friends that he has programmed a new vehicle that is made for travelling through the Cortex easily called the Megapod, and Yumi is chosen as the driver. Unfortunately, Laura follows William to the factory and discovers the lab and Supercomputer, which she is very interested in. During a battle with several Krabs, Aelita, Odd and Ulrich are devirtualized, leaving Yumi trapped in the Megapod. With Laura's help, Jeremy fixes the bugged vehicle and Yumi is returned to Earth just before the Megapod falls into the Digital Sea. Back in the lab, the team debate about whether they should accept Laura into their group. Aelita, however, is still resentful and distrustful of Laura and launches a return to the past so that she will not remember anything.
5	"Rivalité" "Rivalry"	26 January 2013	19 November 2019	105
William Dunbar is yet again rejected by the quintet, but when he asks Yumi to come work on their group project she happily agrees, much to Ulrich's disdain. The dislike between the two grows when XANA creates a specter of William to attack Yumi, and the two almost have a fistfight in the gym. Soon after deactivating the tower, another one appears. It's too soon for Odd, Aelita and Yumi to return to Lyoko, so it's up to Ulrich and William to put their differences aside and get Ulrich to the tower to deactivate it. At first the two are showing off and trying to outdo each other, but after William saves Ulrich from falling into the Digital Sea, they call a truce, allowing Ulrich to deactivate the tower. Once back on Earth, William is fully accepted into the group as the sixth Lyoko warrior.
6	"Soupçons" "Suspicion"	2 February 2013	26 November 2019	106
Aelita is determined to discover if her father really is involved in XANA's miraculous and mysterious return. So she, Odd, Ulrich and William go to the Cortex, with Odd piloting the Megapod to help her, while Yumi chooses to stay behind to set up a fundraising party in the gym, enlisting the aid of a shy boy named Remi. He tries to help but accidentally breaks the sound system. Meanwhile, in the heart of the Cortex, the walls start to go haywire and devirtualize Odd and Ulrich, leaving William to save Aelita before he, too, is devirtualized. Back on Earth, they go to help Yumi. Remi is knocked unconscious by an electrical phenomenon and he's replaced by a specter with the ability to create two clones of itself. In Sector 5, Aelita goes to the spot where she last saw her father, and asks if he has anything do with XANA being reborn and resurrected. Jeremy suddenly alerts a saddened Aelita that a tower is activated in the Desert Region, and goes to deactivate it before Yumi, Ulrich, Odd and William engage in battle with the three Remi duplicates. Surprisingly instead of attacking, XANA fixes the broken sound system and leaves without any trouble.
7	"Compte-à-rebours" "Countdown"	9 February 2013	3 December 2019	107
Samantha Suarez - Odd's former sweetheart and girlfriend - enrolls at Kadic, and the boy eagerly pursues her. At the same time, he is being pursued by a specter. As an indication of XANA's increasing power, this specter is polymorphic, able to change its appearance at will. The others go to Lyoko to deactivate the tower but are all devirtualized by a giant wall of 121 Bloks. Odd destroys the wall using a scanner eyepiece programmed by Jeremy and deactivates the tower. Meanwhile, Jeremy's computer is set on repairing a corrupted video file recovered from the Cortex. Eventually the task is completed and the gang watch the clip of Franz Hopper, furious at an employee who stole some documents of his. He fires the man and storms out, but the man remains in the room and laughs, calling Franz too naïve. Aelita had never heard of the man before, but they learn from the video that his name is Tyron.
8	"Virus"	16 February 2013	10 December 2019	108
Jeremy tries to create a virus to destroy the Cortex, however it doesn't work and the group discusses what to do. They decide to lure Laura to the factory. When she gets there the gang explains about XANA and the Cortex and that they need her help, which she accepts to give. She easily fixes the problem and they launch the virus and a return to the past. Laura forgets everything, but thanks to a few hidden commands in the virus, the code for the return to the past was altered to exclude Laura, causing her to start having memory flashbacks of her time in the lab. She follows the memories to the sewers. William (who was left on Earth) tries to stall her, but fails, and Laura ends up back at the lab. Meanwhile, Ulrich and Yumi encounter Ninjas in the Cortex for the first time, but are unable to defeat the new monsters and are sent back to Earth in no time. Laura agrees to keep the factory a secret and to help them out with programming to destroy XANA once and for all when they need her. With little choice, they welcome her into the group as the seventh member of Team Lyoko, which she gladly accepts.
9	"Comment tromper XANA (Translation: How to Fool XANA)" "The Bait"	23 February 2013	17 December 2019	109
Jeremy and Aelita program false source codes that will destroy any specter that tries to take them from a Lyoko Warrior, and tests it using Ulrich as a guinea pig. Ulrich is told to wait at school until he spots a specter and deliberately touch it to transfer the fake source codes to it to test if they work. A specter with hypnotic abilities appears the same day. If the specter manages to catch someone's gaze, it can send them into a trance-like state which the specter can use to approach a Lyoko Warrior and take their source codes without them fighting back. Ulrich manages to test the false source codes and destroys the specter, but it knocks him unconscious for a while. Jeremy decides not to try it again as it is too risky.
10	"Le réveil du guerrier (Translation: The Warrior's Awakening)" "A Time to Fight"	2 March 2013	24 December 2019	110
The gang return to the Cortex to get data on the mysterious Ninjas. Ulrich opts out of the mission because he has a karate competition to attend, and Jim won't let him skip it. The others don't fare well against the Ninjas until Ulrich arrives, offering them advice that Jim passed on to him: be unpredictable. With the advice given by Ulrich, and a new bo staff weapon programmed for Yumi, she manages to defeat the three Ninjas easily and gathers the data. In it they find a video clip of Professor Tyron addressing several humans dressed in ninja-like costumes. Ulrich wins the competition and gives his trophy to Jim, thanking him greatly for his advice.
11	"Rendez-vous" "Rendezvous"	9 March 2013	31 December 2019	111
Jeremy is woken up by the Superscan when it picks up two activated towers. He warns the others, and just as they're leaving Aelita receives a message from an unknown sender asking her to meet them in a nearby building. While she's thinking about it, Laura comes and says she heard Aelita's phone ringing. Aelita tells her there's an alert and she should go on ahead to the lab, which she happily does. Aelita then goes to the meeting place and finds a blonde-haired woman there; her long-lost mother, Anthea. They share a warm mother-daughter embrace. Jeremy offers Laura the controls and goes to find Aelita, realizing her "mother" is actually a specter, and tries to convince her of it. Aelita doesn't believe him and returns to the specter. Meanwhile, Laura figures out XANA's strategy: activating the two towers one after the other in a specific sequence of prime numbers. She relays the information to Odd and Yumi on Lyoko, who then enter the towers at the right moment and deactivate them, destroying the specter in Aelita's arms. Aelita feels remorseful for her actions, but the gang all stick up for her, firmly assuring her that she is not alone. As Laura leaves, Aelita thanks her for her help.
12	"Chaos à Kadic" "Chaos at Kadic"	16 March 2013	7 January 2020	112
A computer error causes the science test scores at Kadic to be messed up, as well as bugging up the rest of the computer system with it. Jeremy is alerted to an activated tower and he, Aelita, Odd, Ulrich and Laura go to the lab to check it out. Laura's dad is called to the school as a result of the marks mix-up and he calls her back to the principal's office. He expresses his doubt in the school's ability to help his daughter achieve the highest level, and decides he wants her to transfer to another school. Laura insists on staying, deciding to show him the Supercomputer as proof of what Kadic can offer her. Meanwhile, the others explore Lyoko looking for the activated tower that's nowhere to be found. Jeremy eventually picks it up in the Cortex and sends them there to take care of it. When Laura and her dad arrive, Aelita goes back to the lab to get them out of Jeremy's way so the mission can be completed. The tower is deactivated and a return to the past is launched. The group decides to keep Laura in the group, but to only include her when she's absolutely needed and to keep her under strict surveillance from now on.
13	"Vendredi 13 (Translation: Friday the 13th)" "Betting on Odd"	23 March 2013	14 January 2020	113
It's Friday the 13th and Odd can't believe his luck - he's won the lottery! He tries to impress Samantha with this fact, but he doesn't manage to catch up to her in time. Jeremy discovers that the lottery wins are happening all over Europe, and realises that it must be XANA. The group minus Odd head to Lyoko to deactivate the tower in Sector 5, which they do successfully. They return home and Odd comes to the lab feeling gloomy about not actually winning the lottery and his situation with Samantha, having bought a thousand red roses to give to her thinking he truly had won the jackpot. Jeremy then notices that XANA had used the tower as a diversion to attack the Skid with a virus while they weren't looking. Odd is the only one who can go in and must pilot the bugged-up Skid and try to counter the virus with little experience doing either. Laura is called in to help, but they don't make much progress. Jeremy then decides to virtualise Laura into the Skid to help on site, and she becomes extremely excited about the idea. Aelita, however, quickly guides Odd through the steps and together they counter the virus just before Laura is about to be transferred. The Skid is returned to normal and Laura leaves, furious about not having to go to Lyoko after all. The gang make it up to Odd for his amazing solo work by setting him up with Samantha with the thousand roses he purchased. She is touched by Odd's gifts, and warmly kisses him on the cheek.
14	"Intrusion" "Stowaway"	30 March 2013	21 January 2020	114
The gang has planned a routine data gathering mission in the Cortex. However, Ulrich opts out of the mission when he finds out that Yumi wrote some negative things about him. While in the Cortex being attacked by Ninjas, Yumi can't stop thinking about Ulrich. She gets herself devirtualized on purpose just to go talk to him and work things out. The two soon reconcile. Meanwhile, a Ninja, not defeated in the fight in the Cortex, follows the Megapod back to the Skid, then hangs onto the Skid all the way back to the hangar in Sector 5. William ends up being left alone to fend off the Ninja, which is heading for the Core of Lyoko itself. Ulrich is called in and easily destroys the Ninja with his sabers, but it plants a sinister-looking device on the bottom of a platform in Sector 5 before it disappears.
15	"Les sans-codes (Translation: The Codeless)" "Spartan"	6 April 2013	28 January 2020	115
A tower is activated and a specter is sent after Odd, taking the appearance of a football player. Aelita and Ulrich go to deactivate the tower, but when they reach it, Aelita is unable to enter. The tower deactivated itself because Odd lost the last of his source codes to the specter. Odd then formulates a protection plan where the "no-coders" protect the people who can't return to Lyoko for 12 hours, and who have nowhere to hide from XANA's specters. William is particularly annoyed at Yumi and quickly becomes fed up with Odd's plan and being referred to as a "no-coder," and he storms off. Another tower is activated and Ulrich and Aelita are shut in a closet under Odd's protection while Yumi calls a truce with William so they can go to Lyoko. When he and Yumi reach the tower they're confronted by an evil clone of William who plays on his doubts, telling him that he's being used by the gang, especially Yumi. He and the clone then chase after Yumi while the footballer specter finds Ulrich and Aelita and corners them. Odd realizes that the sound system can be used to disrupt the specter and stop it from advancing, so he starts singing Frère Jacques over the PA to delay it, angering Jim. Meanwhile, William turns on his clone, allowing Yumi to get to the tower and deactivate it.
16	"Confusion"	13 April 2013	4 February 2020	116
Towers are being activated and deactivated constantly and XANA is trying and failing to send specters. Laura follows the group to the lab and Jeremy allows her to help, seeing as it's an unusual case. While in the lab she asks Aelita about Franz Hopper. Not getting a decent answer, she goes to do research in the library before confronting Aelita, saying that she knows Franz built the Supercomputer, and that he apparently abandoned his daughter. Aelita replies that her father didn't abandon her, but selflessly sacrificed himself for her, and asked Laura if her own father would do the same for her. Aelita returns to the lab. The gang decides they'll have more luck finding out what's going on by going to the Cortex, where XANA currently lives. They happen upon a huge battle between Tyron's Ninjas and XANA's monsters in the Dome, and can't figure out why the two are fighting each other because Tyron's Supercomputer is what's allowing XANA access to the network. Jeremy decides to organize a meeting with Tyron himself to ask some questions. Later that night the gang goes back to the factory, and Aelita and Yumi are sent in to talk to Tyron about XANA. Tyron claims he knows nothing about the artificial intelligence, and that there was no way it could be living inside his own supercomputer. He then has two of his ninjas try to imprison Aelita and Yumi inside the Cortex, but Jeremy pulls them out just in time. It's then that the six Lyoko Warriors realize they are up against two separate, dangerous threats rather than just one.
17	"Un avenir professionnel assuré" "A Bright Career Ahead"	20 April 2013	11 February 2020	117
A man named Graven shows up at Kadic asking after Jeremy, the smartest kid in school, offering him a place in a special scientific institution specialising in quantum physics. Jeremy denies having any knowledge of the subject, then figures out that Graven is an agent sent by Tyron, and that they must have traced Lyoko's location on Earth somehow. Graven gives up on Jeremy and moves on to Laura, the second smartest in the school. Aelita sends the others to Sector 5 to search for any kind of tracking device that the Ninja from episode 14, Stowaway, could have planted while it was on Lyoko. They find it but don't manage to destroy it, as when it's damaged it sends out an electromagnetic pulse that causes the Lyoko Warriors pain and threatens to damage the Supercomputer. They decide to dispose of it in the Cortex, carefully removing it from the bottom of the platform and taking it to the Replika in the Skid. XANA retaliates in the Digital Sea by sending Kongers, but they manage to make it there. Meanwhile, Laura accidentally lets Graven know about her knowledge of quantum physics, and he surmises that she must have something to do with Lyoko, showing her holographic images of Aelita, Odd, Yumi, Ulrich and William's virtual avatars, asking her if she recognizes them. She denies it, but Aelita comes in and tells her that Tyron found the Supercomputer, and that the group surrender to Graven. He tells the girls to take him to the Supercomputer. Ulrich disposes of the tracking device and everyone comes back to Earth just as Graven enters the lab with the girls. Jeremy launches a return to the past. At the beginning of the day again, Graven gets a phone call saying they lost Lyoko's signal, and to abort his mission. He leaves as the gang watches on. Laura pulls the scientific institution's card out of her bag, studying it, still very interested in the idea.
18	"Obstination" "Resolve"	27 April 2013	19 February 2020	118
Aelita dreams of her long-lost mother, Anthea. She wakes up and goes to see Jeremy, but finds Laura there with him, working together on the virus to destroy the Cortex. A hurt Aelita leaves, and Laura smugly denies that there was anyone at the door. Jeremy and Laura finish the virus and the group plans to implement it that afternoon, but Odd gets detention and Ulrich sprains his ankle, forcing both of them to opt out. William, Aelita and Yumi go in. By the time they reach the center of the Cortex, only Aelita remains. She accesses the mainframe and finds a webcam stream of Tyron working in his lab at that very moment. She observes the stream for a minute, telling Jeremy what's going on, then moves to infect the Cortex with the virus. But when she looks up, she sees her mother Anthea there in Tyron's lab, working on one of the computers. After a moment of confusion, Aelita firmly insists on destroying the Cortex and XANA along with it, but Jeremy and the others unanimously decide to abort the mission for now as there is proof that Aelita's mother is indeed alive and there's a chance of reuniting her with her daughter. Aelita comes back to Earth, upset about not destroying XANA, but her friends convince her that the risk was worth it. Jeremy assures her that if XANA gains 95% of its strength, they will destroy it and the Cortex immediately; no questions asked.
19	"Le piège" "The Trap"	4 May 2013 (iTunes); 12 December 2013 (Canal J)	25 February 2020	119
Thanks to Odd, Jeremy comes up with the idea of getting source codes back from specters, thus reducing XANA's power. The plan works and they trap a specter, but things go horribly wrong when it ends up on Lyoko in the form of blackish-green particles, severely damaging and disabling the scanners and putting the Lyoko Warriors it touches into a coma-like state. Jeremy can't bring the others back or even send William to help because of the damage to the scanners. The specter then tries to throw Yumi into the Digital Sea. Odd enters the Desert Way Tower and Jeremy uploads the codes they stole from the specter into him. Odd races to the activated tower with the specter in hot pursuit. He enters the tower and the specter goes in after him, but he manages to deactivate it before the specter touches him. Meanwhile Aelita resorts to social networking to try to find her mother. After the mission Jeremy tells her the good news: they were able to steal 4% of XANA's power and Odd is capable of deactivating towers again. Aelita then tells Jeremy her good news: she is getting hundreds of responses about her long-lost mother as hundreds of people all over the world join the effort to find Anthea Schaeffer.: This is the only episode that shares a title from the animated series
20	"Espionage" "Espionage"	13 December 2013	3 March 2020	120
Jeremy manages to develop a program that will allow the gang to hack Tyron's surveillance system and spy on him, both using video and sound, and potentially speak to Anthea. When the gang go to the Cortex to implement it, all but Aelita are devirtualized by Ninjas when they tip off an unforeseen security system. Aelita opts to stay in the Cortex's core to wait for her mother to appear, asking for a clone to replace her at the school while she's gone, which causes enough problems of its own. In the end, Aelita is able to speak to her long-lost mother, convincing her that she is alive before she is devirtualized by Ninjas. The experience initially leaves her feeling sad, but after Jeremy assures her that Anthea did indeed get her message regardless of her shock, her spirits are rekindled.
21	"Faux-semblants (Translation: False Pretenses)" "Imposters"	14 December 2013	10 March 2020	121
Aelita confides in Yumi that she's feeling depressed because her mother still hasn't attempted to contact her. Yumi suggests they have a girls' day out to take her mind off things and Aelita accepts, but Sissi decides to invite herself along as well. When a tower is activated Sissi refuses to leave their side, so Yumi heads for the lab while Aelita is forced to return to the school and keep Sissi occupied. XANA sends a polymorphic specter that keeps changing its face, taking the appearance of the Lyoko Warriors themselves and making it nearly impossible to tell who's who. The gang quickly become paranoid and distrustful, and begin asking each other personal questions to figure out who their friends are. Lyoko isn't free of this confusion either: XANA starts sending fake avatars, virtual clones of the Lyoko Warriors that look and act just like them. Even Jeremy can't tell them apart on his screen. Jeremy and Laura collaborate on a program to identify the virtual clones so Odd can get rid of them and deactivate the tower in time to save Yumi and Aelita from the polymorphic specter.
22	"Mutinerie" "Mutiny"	15 December 2013	17 March 2020	122
Laura and Jeremy finally finish their virus. Laura is keen to implement it immediately and destroy both the Cortex and XANA, but Jeremy insists they wait until Aelita has made more progress with her mother, Anthea. Meanwhile William feels neglected after Yumi tells him she's too busy to read a book he offered her. Laura takes the opportunity to try and recruit William for her cause, and after some persuading he hesitantly agrees. She sends him into the Cortex, but when he arrives, he is greeted by a massive army of Krabes and no Megapod. Not soon after, the Scyphozoa makes its reappearance, ready to possess William as XANA's servant once again. It captures William and it's up to Yumi, Aelita, and Ulrich to set him free again. For her betrayal, the others vote unanimously to permanently exclude Laura from the group, and a furious Jeremy launches a new modified version of the return to the past to have her memory of the Supercomputer fully erased.
23	"Le blues de Jeremy" "Jeremy's Blues"	16 December 2013	24 March 2020	123
It's Aelita's "birthday" and someone is trying to hack into the supercomputer. The firewalls Jeremy created manage to stop it from getting in. When analyzing the data packet sent, Jeremy notices that it is of unusual design: created by Franz Hopper. Perhaps Anthea is trying to contact them to wish her daughter a happy birthday. Jeremy calls the others but does not alert Aelita, as he wants it to be a surprise. Ulrich and Odd go into the Digital Sea to track down the hub that sent the packet. But when they start collecting the data, a huge tentacle emerges from the hub and ensnares the Skid. Malware is sent to the Supercomputer, shutting the holomap and superscan down. It was all a trap laid by XANA, and Jeremy can do nothing against it, nor can he devirtualize Odd and Ulrich as the Skid's protection shields slowly fail. Aelita is called in and comes to the rescue, bringing the boys in just before the Skid shatters. Jeremy loses all hope and begins to doubt his own abilities. Yumi goes to Lyoko to search for activated towers while Aelita and Jeremy work on fixing everything. After accidentally endangering Yumi's life, Jeremy leaves, depressed. Aelita saves her and then comes back to the lab to find Jeremy gone, but she cannot go after him because a tower is activated. William is sent in to help, but against an army of duplicating Kankrelats they get nowhere. A specter of Ms Hertz attacks Aelita in the lab, and when Jeremy hears about it he runs back to the lab to help, fixing the holomap and figuring everything out so that the tower can be deactivated in time before Aelita is drained of any more source codes.
24	"Paradoxe temporel" "Time Warp"	17 December 2013	31 March 2020	124
During a training mission on the Cortex, the Megapod bugs up and Jeremy is forced to figure out how to repair it. Just as he does so, the superscan finds an activated tower on the Cortex. But when they arrive on site, they find the tower has a purple halo. It has been activated by Tyron, and the Lyoko Warriors are soon surrounded by Ninjas, and Odd, Aelita and Ulrich become trapped in a temporal bubble that sends them back to that morning's gym class, repeating it dozens of times over. They must find a way to contact Jeremy to tell them what happened so that he can destroy the bubble before Tyron uses its signal to track their location on Earth. Meanwhile, Laura finds the card that was given to her in A Bright Career Ahead. Not remembering where she got it from, she dials the number, arranging for a video interview. Tyron himself conducts the interview, but becomes disinterested in her when she reveals that she has never worked with a quantum supercomputer before. Just before hanging up, Tyron shows her images of Odd, Ulrich, Aelita, Yumi and William's virtual avatars, asking them who they are. Laura tells him that they look just like Jeremy Belpois' best friends. Tyron thanks her greatly for her help and hangs up, leaving Laura upset and offended.
25	"Hécatombe (Translation: Massacre)" "Disaster"	18 December 2013	7 April 2020	125
A mission to gather more information on Aelita's mother is cancelled when XANA launches another attack in the Mountain Sector. Unable to warn Odd and Ulrich, the two boys become the targets of XANA's attacks. Odd loses all of his codes once again. Meanwhile Aelita and Yumi are pinned in the Cortex by XANA's forces en route to deactivate the tower, and Yumi is later devirtualized. On Earth, XANA has stolen Ulrich's codes as well. Realizing that Yumi is on Earth too, XANA sends the specter to find and recover the codes. Odd is sent to provide William and Aelita with backup while Ulrich goes looking for Yumi. After arguing with Jeremy over Yumi's safety, William devirtualizes himself in order to find her. Odd goes to Lyoko while Aelita is being pursued by Kongers in the Digital Sea. After Ulrich calls Yumi to ask where she is, she's spotted by the specter. William and Ulrich team up to go look for Yumi, but split up after finding her phone lying abandoned on the ground. While on Lyoko, Odd is pinned down and out of ammunition, the Bloks are pushing him towards the Digital Sea. Aelita shows up in the Skid and destroys all the monsters. Yumi is attacked by the specter, but rescued by Ulrich. After deactivating the tower, it is revealed that XANA has regained 95% of its power. Keeping the promise, it is decided that the virus that Jeremy, Laura, and Aelita have been working on will now be used to destroy Tyron's supercomputer, preventing any further communication with Anthea Hopper.
26	"Ultime mission" "The Final Mission" (Note: Also known as "The Ultimate Mission" in the YouTube video title.)	19 December 2013	14 April 2020	126
Aelita insists they destroy the Cortex right away and they set out on what should be their final mission. But due to interference from XANA, they don't even make it inside the Dome; the mission is a failure and they're forced to wait twelve hours before they can try again. As she's on her way back to the lab for their second attempt of finally exterminating their longtime virtual enemy once and for all, Aelita is called to the principal's office where she finds Tyron waiting for her. He reveals that he's been married to Anthea for four years now, making him her stepfather. He gives her Anthea's locket and shows her a digital message a happy Anthea left for her, telling Aelita she can completely trust Tyron to reunite them. He then tells Aelita to call off the mission to destroy his Supercomputer or else she'll never see her mother again, but Aelita refuses and escapes. After finding out the locket contains a tracking device, Yumi takes it and stays at the school while Aelita goes to join Odd, William and Ulrich on the Cortex. Tyron apprehends Yumi and then orders for his Supercomputer to be shut down. The virus is successfully transferred to his Supercomputer but it doesn't have time to take effect before the machine is shut down. Aelita and the others barely manage to escape in time and make it back to Earth. Tyron suddenly has a dilemma on his hands: if he turns his Supercomputer on and recreates the Cortex, the virus will activate and destroy his system in full. Despite this, the Lyoko Warriors have only won part of the battle. XANA and Tyron have both been neutralized but not destroyed, and Tyron has all the time he needs to find a way to counteract the virus. The Lyoko Warriors shut down their own Supercomputer so that XANA can't take refuge in it. With questions about Aelita's mother, Tyron's guardianship and XANA's return still hanging over them, they're determined to stick together and remain on their guard.
