= Hal Film Maker =

Japanese animation studio

Hal Film Maker Co., Ltd.
- Native name: 株式会社ハルフィルムメーカー
- Romanized name: Kabushiki gaisha Haru Firumu Mēkā
- Type: Kabushiki gaisha
- Industry: Anime
- Founded: August 11, 1993; 33 years ago
- Defunct: July 1, 2009; 17 years ago
- Fate: Merged with Yumeta Company
- Successor: Yumeta Company
- Key people: Junichi Satō (representative director); Katsunori Haruda (representative director)
- Parent: TYO
- Subsidiaries: Real-T (2006-2009); Yūhodō (2007–2009)

Hal Film Maker Co., Ltd. (Japanese: 株式会社ハルフィルムメーカー, Hepburn: Kabushiki gaisha Haru Firumu Mēkā) was a Japanese animation studio founded in August 1993 by former Toei Animation staff.

Hal Film Maker's parent company, TYO Inc., merged its two anime studio subsidiaries—Yumeta Company and Hal Film Maker—on July 1, 2009. Yumeta Company absorbed Hal Film Maker and changed its name to TYO Animations before reverting to Yumeta Company on December 1, 2017.

== Works ==
=== Television series ===
Year	Title	Director(s)	Episodes	Note(s)	Ref(s)
1998	Saber Marionette J to X	Masami Shimoda	26	Sequel to Saber Marionette J Again. (1998–99)	
2000	Boys Be...	Masami Shimoda	13	Adaptation of the manga series by Masahiro Itabashi.	
2000	Strange Dawn	Junichi Sato	13	Original work.	
2001	Prétear	Junichi Sato	13	Adaptation of the manga series by Junichi Sato.	
2002	Princess Tutu	Junichi Sato, Shogo Koumoto	26	An original work created by Ikuko Itoh. (2002–03)	
2004	Uta Kata	Keiji Gotoh	12	Co-produced with Bandai Visual.	
2005	Bludgeoning Angel Dokuro-Chan	Tsutomu Mizushima	4	Adaptation of the light novel series by Masaki Okayu.	
2005	Fushigiboshi no Futagohime	Junichi Sato	51	Original work. (2005–06)	
2005	Aria the Animation	Junichi Sato	13	Adaptation of the manga series by Kozue Amano.	
2006	Fushigiboshi no Futagohime Gyu!	Junichi Sato	52	Sequel to Fushigiboshi no Futagohime. (2006–07)	
2006	Aria the Natural	Junichi Sato	26	The second season of Aria.	
2006	The Good Witch of the West	Katsuichi Nakayama	16	Adaptation of the novel series by Noriko Ogiwara.	
2006	Ōban Star-Racers	Savin Yeatman-Eiffel; Thomas Romain	26	A French-Japanese anime series created by Savin Yeatman-Eiffel. Co-produced with Sav! The World Productions and Pumpkin 3D.	
2007	Bludgeoning Angel Dokuro-chan Second	Tsutomu Mizushima	2	Sequel to Bludgeoning Angel Dokuro-Chan.	
2007	Night Wizard the Animation	Yūsuke Yamamoto	13	Based on the Night Wizard! role-playing game, designed by Takeshi Kikuchi and FarEast Amusement Research.	
2007	Sketchbook ~full color's~	Yoshimasa Hiraike	13	Adaptation of the manga series of by Totan Kobako.	
2008	Aria the Origination	Junichi Sato	13	The third season of Aria.	
2008	Someday's Dreamers: Summer Skies	Osamu Kobayashi	12	Adaptation of the manga series by Norie Yamada.	
2008	Kemeko Deluxe!	Tsutomu Mizushima	12	Adaptation of the manga series by Masakazu Iwasaki.	
2008	Skip Beat!	Kiyoko Sayama	25	Adaptation of the shōjo manga series by Yoshiki Nakamura. (2008–09)	
2010	B Gata H Kei	Yūsuke Yamamoto	12	Adaptation of the yonkoma series by Yōko Sanri.	

=== Other works ===
Year	Title	Director(s)	Episodes	Note(s)	Ref(s)
1995	Macross 7: The Galaxy is Calling Me!	Tetsurō Amino	1	Side-story to Macross 7 (1994–95). Co-animated with Studio Junio.	
1997	Saber Marionette J Again	Masami Shimoda	6	Sequel to Saber Marionette J. (1997–98)	
2000	Angel Sanctuary	Kiyoko Sayama	3	Adaptation of the shōjo manga series by Kaori Yuki.	
2001	Slayers Premium	Junichi Sato	1	The fifth Slayers film.	
2003	Heart Cocktail Again	—N/a	1	An OVA produced to celebrate the 20th anniversary of Seizō Watase's Heart Cocktail manga series.	
2004	Ghost Talker's Daydream	Osamu Sekita	4	Adaptation of the shōnen manga series by Saki Okuse.	
2007	Aria the OVA: Arietta	Junichi Sato	1		
2008	Yotsunoha	Hiroshi Nishikiori	2	Based on the visual novel developed by Haikuo Soft.	
2010	Tamayura	Junichi Sato	4	An original work created by Junichi Sato.	
