= Origin of the World =

Origin of the World may refer to:

In science:

- Formation and evolution of the Solar System
- Cosmogony

In religion and philosophy

- On the Origin of the World, Gnostic work dealing with creation and end times
- Demiurge, a term for a creator deity responsible for the creation of the physical universe
- Sophia (wisdom)

In the arts

- L'Origine du monde (The Origin of the World), 1866 painting by Gustave Courbet
- The Origin of the World, novel by Pierre Michon
- "The Origin of the World" (Ōban Star-Racers episode), episode of the series Ōban Star-Racers
- The Origin of the World (film), an American epic Western drama
