= Code Lyoko: Evolution =

2012 French teen drama science fiction television series

- Genre: Action-adventure; Teen drama Science fiction Superhero; Cyberpunk
- Created by: Tania Palumbo; Thomas Romain
- Directed by: Luccio di Rosa (live-action); Florian Ferrier (CGI)
- Starring: Léonie Berthonnaud; Marin Lafitte; Gulliver Bevernage; Quentin Merabet; Mélanie Tran; Diego Mestanza; Pauline Serieys; Bastien Thelliez; Frank Beckmann; Sophie Fern
- Country of origin: France
- Original language: French
- No. of seasons: 1
- No. of episodes: 26 (list of episodes)

Production
- Executive producers: Christophe di Sabatino; Benoît di Sabatino; Maia Tubiana
- Production locations: Paris, France Boulogne-Billancourt
- Animators: Antefilms Studio; Krayon Pictures
- Camera setup: Single-camera
- Running time: 23 minutes
- Production companies: MoonScoop; Lagardere Thematiques

Original release
- Network: France 4 Canal J
- Release: 5 January – 19 December 2013

Related
- Code Lyoko

Code Lyoko: Evolution is a French teen drama science fiction television series created by Thomas Romain and Tania Palumbo and produced by MoonScoop for France Télévisions, Lagardère Thématiques and Canal J, in association with Sofica Cofanim, Backup Media, and B Media Kids. It is a live-action/CGI-animated continuation of the French animated television series Code Lyoko.

The series centers on a group of teenagers who travel to the virtual world of Lyoko to battle against a malignant artificial intelligence known as XANA, who once again threatens Earth with its extraordinary abilities to access the real world and cause trouble via activating one of ten towers on each of Lyoko's five regions, excluding its Forest and Ice regions.

The scenes in the real world employ live-action with hand-painted backgrounds, while the scenes on Lyoko and the Cortex are presented in 3D CGI animation. It premiered on January 5, 2013 on France 4 and 30 November 2013 on Canal J. It blends live-action with 3D CGI animation, picking up where the original series left off. In addition to improving upon the CGI in the original series, the soundtrack has been overhauled as well.

== Plot ==
One year after the events of the original animated series, Aelita Schaeffer, Jeremy Belpois, Odd Della Robbia, Ulrich Stern, Yumi Ishiyama, and newly welcomed member of the group William Dunbar return to their daily lives at Kadic Academy. XANA, an autonomous, sentient multi-agent system/artificial intelligence that they had succeeded in defeating previously, reappears, reborn with more power than before. The protagonists reactivate Franz Hopper's quantum supercomputer, which runs the virtual world Lyoko, and resume their former double lives in order to protect humanity from the threat of XANA once again. Joined by William Dunbar, who has finally been accepted as the sixth Lyoko Warrior, and unreliable girl-genius Laura Gauthier, the heroes seek to unravel the reasons for XANA's return and exterminate it.

XANA is unable to take over the network due to missing some of its essential "Source Codes," which it injected into the Lyoko Warriors, except for William, during their final virtualization in the original series. It is now trying to steal them back through its polymorphic specters, and Jeremy reasons that, if XANA regains all of its Codes, it will take over the internet again and nothing will be able to stop it. One benefit to having Codes, however, is that their carrier can deactivate towers on Lyoko under XANA's control, making all but William capable of doing so as opposed to just Aelita alone. With the help of Laura, Jeremy works to write a virus that will hopefully be capable of eradicating XANA for good.

In addition to XANA, the gang eventually discovers that they have another enemy: the Swiss mad scientist Professor Lowell Tyron, who is seemingly responsible for unintentionally reactivating XANA. However, he claims to have no knowledge of XANA despite its high level of activity in the Cortex system, a Replika and virtual world similar to Lyoko that he created. He commands a group of virtual human avatars known as Ninjas to counter the Lyoko Warriors' efforts to hack into his system. In Professor Tyron's lab, the group discovers Aelita's long-lost mother, Anthea, and, while attempting to reunite her with her daughter, seek to discover why she is with their new enemy.

In the cliffhanger finale, it is revealed that Professor Tyron has been married to Anthea for four years, making him Aelita's stepfather. Tyron attempts to coerce Aelita into telling her friends to abort their plan to destroy the Cortex and coming with him, as he has legal custody of her, or risk never seeing her mother again. Aelita ultimately chooses to forsake her mother and go through with their original plan, and Tyron orders his subordinates to shut down his supercomputer while the Lyoko Warriors are still inside. They barely escape after injecting Jeremy's virus into the core of the Cortex, meaning that XANA would be destroyed upon Tyron's supercomputer being rebooted, unless XANA was able to back itself up or Tyron is able to repair his supercomputer and XANA along with it. As such, it is never revealed whether XANA was entirely destroyed, nor the identities of the Ninjas and the long awaited reunion between Aelita and Anthea.

According to Sophie Decroisette, head writer for the original show's first three seasons, Evolution is not considered canon to the original show.

== Characters ==
=== Main ===
Jeremie Belpois (French: Jérémie Belpois)

Portrayed by: Marin Lafitte
A thirteen-year-old computer genius and top student in class, whose discovery and activation of the supercomputer in the nearby abandoned factory began the group's struggle against XANA.

Aelita Schaeffer

Portrayed by: Léonie Berthonnaud
Primarily known by her alias, Aelita Stones, she is the brains of the group alongside Jeremy. Her father, Franz Hopper, created the Supercomputer, Lyoko, and XANA, and ultimately sacrificed himself to try and stop XANA once and for all.

Odd Della Robbia

Portrayed by: Gulliver Bevernaege
The comic relief of the group and a rebellious student who is not interested in studying. He shares a dorm with Ulrich, where he used to keep his beloved dog Kiwi.

Ulrich Stern

Portrayed by: Quentin Merabet
A more reserved member of the group, Ulrich has been implanted with some of XANA's source codes and is a target for its polymorphic specters.

Yumi Ishiyama

Portrayed by: Mélanie Tran
A fairly reserved student who lives near and attends Kadic. She is the oldest of the group, and is of Japanese descent.

William Dunbar

Portrayed by: Diego Mestanza
An overconfident student in Yumi's class. William is initially kept uninformed about XANA's return due to the group's mistrust of him.

Laura Gauthier

Portrayed by: Pauline Serieys
The temporary seventh member of the Lyoko Warriors.

=== Antagonists ===
XANA

A powerful and dangerous multi-agent system/artificial intelligence that reprises its role in Code Lyoko as the main antagonist of the series.

XANA's Monsters

Virtual creatures that XANA uses to protect the towers it has activated and prevent the heroes from accessing the towers or reaching the center of the Cortex.

Professor Lowell Tyron

Portrayed by: Franck Beckmann
The secondary antagonist, responsible for the creation of the Cortex within his quantum supercomputer in Switzerland.

Ninjas

Human avatars similar to the five Lyoko Warriors, who are sent to the Cortex by Professor Tyron from his laboratory in Switzerland.

=== Supporting ===
Jim Morales (French: Jim Moralès)

Portrayed by: Bastien Thelliez
The physical education teacher at Kadic Academy and the chief disciplinarian.

Samantha Suarez

Portrayed by: Louise Vallat
Odd's love interest.

Anthea Schaeffer

Portrayed by: Sandrine Rigaux
Aelita's long-lost mother and widow of the late Waldo Franz Shaffer.

Elisabeth "Sissi" Delmas

Portrayed by: Clémency Haynes
Jean-Pierre's daughter and a student at Kadic Academy.

Jean-Pierre Delmas

Portrayed by: Eric Soubelet.
The principal of Kadic Academy and Sissi's father.

Suzanne Hertz

Portrayed by: Sophie Fougère
A science teacher at Kadic who replaced Franz Hopper, as she was once his assistant.

Waldo Franz Schaeffer

Portrayed by: Hugues Massinat.
Primarily known by his alias, Franz Hopper, he is Aelita's late father and first husband of Anthea Hopper-Tyron.

== Filming and production ==
The budget for the series was expected to be €5,600,000.

Jérôme Mouscadet, who served as director of Code Lyoko, and Sophie Decroisette, head writer for the original show's first three seasons, were involved early on in Evolution before leaving due to creative differences. Decroisette specifically wrote the bible for Evolution and synopses for the first couple episodes with Mouscadet, but ultimately left after "I... saw that production wanted to be on a particular story level that didn't agree with my ideas for the series."

== See also ==
- List of French television series
