= Ōban Star-Racers =

English-language French animated television series

- Promotional poster
- Genre: Action; Adventure; Science fantasy
- Created by: Savin Yeatman-Eiffel
- Developed by: Sav! The World Productions; Savin Yeatman-Eiffel; Thomas Romain; Stanislas Brunet; Loic Penon
- Written by: Savin Yeatman-Eiffel
- Directed by: Savin Yeatman-Eiffel; Thomas Romain
- Starring: English: Chiara Zanni; Sam Vincent; Ron Halder; French: Gabrielle Jéru; Thomas Guitard; Jérôme Keen
- Theme music composer: Yoko Kanno
- Opening theme: Chance to Shine - Akino; U.S.: Never Say Never – After Midnight Project; France: Envole-toi vers l'Infini
- Ending theme: Waratteta – Sukoshi
- Composer: Taku Iwasaki
- Countries of origin: France; Japan
- Original language: English
- No. of seasons: 1
- No. of episodes: 26 (list of episodes)

Production
- Executive producers: Savin Yeatman-Eiffel; Michael Lekes
- Producers: Savin Yeatman-Eiffel; Louis Viau; Pascal Chevé
- Editor: Takeshi Seyama
- Running time: 23 minutes
- Production companies: Sav! The World; Hal Film Maker; Pumpkin 3D

Original release
- Network: France 3
- Release: 5 June – 11 December 2006
- Network: Toon Disney (Japan)
- Release: 23 September 2006 – 25 March 2007

Ōban Star-Racers (Note: Ōban Sutā Rēsāzu (オーバン・スターレーサーズ)) is an English-language French-Japanese animated television series created by Savin Yeatman-Eiffel of Sav! The World Productions in association with multiple international companies. Originally produced as a short movie titled Molly, Star-Racer, a television series was developed in cooperation with Jetix Europe, with animation production by Hal Film Maker and Pumpkin 3D, a large portion of which was done in Tokyo, Japan. It aired in more than 100 countries including Japan. In the US, the series aired on the Jetix blocks on ABC Family and Toon Disney between June and December 2006. In Canada, the series aired on Family Channel.

For the 15th anniversary of the series, a public event was held in Paris on December 4, 2021 and a Blu-ray Kickstarter campaign was launched in February 2022 to "release Oban in its original HD format" and "encourage the development of new Oban related projects", raising a total of €377,056 (approximatively 410,000 US dollars). The blu-rays were released at the beginning of 2023.

== Synopsis ==
In the year 2082, Eva Wei, a girl whose mother Maya died in a tragic race accident ten years prior, flees boarding school to see her father, Don Wei, who is heralded as the greatest race manager on the planet. When Don doesn't recognise her due to their long absence from each other, Eva takes on the name of "Molly" to hide her identity and becomes his mechanic. It is then that Don's team is chosen as Earth's representative in an intergalactic racing competition known as the Great Race of Ōban, with the planet's survival depending on Wei's team winning the "Ultimate Prize" that can supposedly grant any wish before the evil Crog Empire can. When the Earth team's star pilot Rick Thunderbolt is unable to race following an act of sabotage, Molly ends up becoming the pilot of the team's ship, Whizzing Arrow, alongside gunner Jordan Wilde. Thus Molly becomes determined to win the competition, not just to save Earth from the Crogs, but also to win the Ultimate Prize and potentially bring her mother back.

== Characters ==
=== Main characters ===
Eva "Molly" Wei
Voiced by: Chiara Zanni (English), Junko Noda (Japanese), Gabrielle Jeru (French)
Eva is an ambitious 15-year-old Chinese-American human girl who often subverts her school studies to improve her mechanical skills. Upon escaping from her harsh boarding school, she travels to find her father, Don Wei. But when he doesn't recognize her she ends up landing a job as a mechanic for his company. Lacking in self-confidence and intimidated by his harsh demeanor, Eva is unable to tell Don Wei who she really is, and assumes the name "Molly" after reading it on a conveniently placed poster. Eva soon becomes the lead pilot for the Earth Team after their star, Rick Thunderbolt, is injured during the first race. Since she is too short to pilot the Whizzing Arrow herself, she modifies the controls to be based on her scooter, which she is an expert at handling. Molly soon meets the other contenders of the Great Race Of Ōban and develops a (mutual) attraction to Prince Aikka of Nourasia. Her life soon becomes more complicated when she learns that the reward for winning Ōban is any wish her heart desires, including bringing her dead mother back to life.

Jordan C. Wilde
Voiced by: Samuel Vincent (English), Keiichirou Satomi (Japanese), Thomas Guitard (French)
Jordan is a 17-year-old rambunctious army soldier who is hired by Don Wei to be the gunner for his racing vehicle. He is a good shot, although he tends to overdo it. Jordan is very protective of his racing partners. As seen throughout the series, Jordan has an intense hatred of the Crogs because his grandfather was attacked by Crogs on an exploring mission (Seen in episode 1). He doesn't approve of Eva's interest in Prince Aikka, as the Nourasians have an alliance with the Crogs. While he acts more like an overprotective brother toward Eva while they are on Alwas, on Ōban he starts to develop more serious feelings for her (though it is unclear if Molly feels the same way about him). Jordan helps Eva fight their way to the Temple of the Heart to stop Canaletto from regaining his Avatar powers. Just when Canaletto is about to capture the sphere containing the Avatar's powers, Jordan tells Molly he loves her and jumps into the sphere, therefore becoming the new Avatar. He and Molly have a brief conversation right after he becomes the new Avatar, in which he tells her goodbye and kisses her. He is last seen on Oban, watching the team leave for Earth (though they don't see him), with a single tear escaping from his eye.

Don Wei
Voiced by: Ron Halder (English), Unshou Ishizuka (Japanese), Jérôme Keen (French)
Don is Eva's father and owner of Wei Racing, a successful Earth corporation that manufactures vehicles and sponsors races. Uptight and arrogant with an openly hostile view towards female pilots, he often hides his true feelings through formalities, as well as pride. When his daughter finds him, not only does he not recognize her—he even mistakes her for a boy at first. The death of his wife and the following separation from his daughter shaped him into the uptight man he seems to be. Due to several events while on Ōban, he finally discovers that Molly is his daughter. Afterwards, he becomes very concerned for Molly's safety due to the increasing danger of the grand finals—even attempting to withdraw the team from the competition to prevent her from racing. Near the end of the series, he reveals to her that he knows she's his daughter, and doesn't want what happened to his wife to happen to her. Although yelled at by Molly, he continues to watch over her without the others knowing about their relationship. Finally before Eva leaves to crown herself Avatar, Don confronts her by her real name in front of the team and tells her he loves her. At the end of the series, he returned to Earth to live with Eva as a family again.

Maya Wei
Voiced by: Nicole Oliver (English), Tomoko Kobashi (Japanese), Sarah Bouché de Vitray (French)
Maya is Eva's mother and Don's wife, one of the best racers on Earth who lost her life in a race ten years before the start of the series. Her sudden death appears to be the reason for Don Wei's current behavior. It originally appeared that Spirit, one of the pilots racing on Alwas, caused her to crash, which was later shown to be false - the crash was caused by Maya's ship leaking fuel from the engine causing it to explode. Eva is determined to win the Great Race of Ōban in order to bring Maya back to life and reunite her family. However, Eva later learns the truth about the "Ultimate Prize" and that the Avatar's power would not bring back her mother. Later, she discovers that her mother was actually "killed"; it was Canaletto who caused the crash. After returning to Earth, she and her father pay their final respects at Maya's grave.

Rick Thunderbolt
Voiced by: Michael Dobson (English), Jun'ichi Suwabe (Japanese), Alexandre Coadour (French)
Rick is a Minor League Racing Champion and one of the best racers on Earth, and is chosen to accompany Don Wei as the Earth Team's original pilot. He is seriously injured in the team's first race, and is later told that he can never race again, a fact that he learns to slowly accept, since racing was "his whole life". Cool and confident, he seems to appreciate Molly's enthusiasm, and affectionately calls her "Little Mouse". He seems to be the first to see her potential as a pilot, playfully asking Don Wei if he took her along as a backup pilot in the second episode. Eventually, Rick becomes Molly's personal coach and begins to discover that Molly is hiding a secret from the team. During the race against Spirit, he finally determines Molly's true identity but doesn't reveal it to anyone else. After the team qualifies for the Grand Finals on Ōban, Rick returns to Earth, but only after he encourages Molly to tell Don she's his daughter and try to work things out.

Koji
Voiced by: Alessandro Juliani (English), Yoshinori Fujita (Japanese), Vincent Latorre (French)
Koji is the Earth Team's co-mechanic and electronics specialist. Originally working at Miguel's Garage, he is hired by Don Wei as part of the Earth Team. Shy and non-combative by nature, he prefers to avoid conflicts, but his quick thinking has saved the Earth Team on many occasions. It was his idea for the 'clustered turbine' hyperdrive that allows the team's new racer, the Whizzing Arrow III, to be much faster than their previous racers. They affectionately call the Arrow III their "baby". After returning to Earth, he goes back to work for Miguel.

Stan
Voiced by: Dexter Bell (English), Keisuke Fujii (Japanese), Nicolas Mead (French)
Stan is the Earth Team's African-American co-mechanic and hardware specialist. Originally working at Miguel's Garage, he is hired by Don Wei as part of the Earth Team. The polar opposite of his fellow mechanic Koji, Stan is very direct and combative, and doesn't hesitate to speak his mind, especially when the safety of a teammate is at stake. Stan feels that Don Wei is putting too much pressure on Molly to win on Ōban, and that Don is too prideful and concerned with his own feelings to consider the feelings of the rest of the team. This is seen the most when the team reaches Oban, as they are usually the spectators of the drama the team faces and are seen having brief conversations about Don Wei's behavior. A recurring theme is Stan telling Koji that Don Wei is heartless and a robot - an idea Koji usually rejects. After returning to Earth, he goes back to work for Miguel.

Prince Aikka
Voiced by: Kirby Morrow (English), Hiroaki Miura (Japanese), Rémi Caillebot (French)
Prince Aikka is the Prince and Knight of Nourasia who races on the back of a giant flying beetle named G'dar, which acts as his vehicle. Noble, chivalrous and skilled in martial arts, he is a rival of Molly's, but also a close friend—since Molly finds him cute and the attraction seems to be mutual. Molly and Aikka promise each other that during their race they would not use weapons against each other (episode 8), but near the end Molly is unable to prevent Jordan from firing. Aikka feels betrayed and gains a distrust of humans. It is later shown, however, that Aikka still cares for Molly and would even come to her defense if he felt she was threatened, such as in her race against Spirit (when she crashes and Spirit seems to want to harm her further, Aikka leaps from the spectator stands and flies to her on G'dar, ready to shoot at Spirit if he tried to hurt her). Aikka is one of the nine Ōban finalists, and appears to have forgiven Molly's "betrayal," but still holds a grudge against Jordan. Once on Ōban, Aikka is pressured by General Kross to cut ties with the Earth Team and eliminate them, as the Crogs have invaded his world and hold his family hostage. He finally succumbs and disables the Arrow III during a race in the mountains. Although he begins to drift from the Earth Team and lose their trust, he later abandons a race and goes looking for Molly after the Arrow III crashes. During the final race, he confronts Molly and Jordan and apologizes, and suggests they defeat Kross together. At the end of the series, he promises to show Molly his kingdom one day after he liberates it from the Crogs.

Satis
Voiced by: Brian Drummond (English), Masashi Hirose (Japanese), Nicolas Mead (French)
Satis is a small, eccentric being who proclaims himself to be the Avatar's loyal servant. He mysteriously appears whenever Molly needs some encouragement, or when things aren't going her way. He also has a second persona, Super Racer, and competes against her in the playoffs on Alwas. Satis becomes even more mysterious, when on Ōban, another grand finalist pilot reveals that he was on all three preliminary planets at the same time. Just prior to the final race, it is revealed that Satis is not the Avatar's servant, but the Avatar himself. Satis was the previous winner of the Great Race 10,000 years ago. It is also revealed that as the finish of the race approaches his power and health have begun to weaken. After Molly refuses to accept the powers of the Avatar, Satis destroys the Pyramid of Power in the temple to prevent Canaletto from stealing the powers. Canaletto defeats him, and Satis is last seen in the hands of Aikka, disappearing into a cloud of lights.

Canaletto
Voiced by: Colin Murdock (English), Umeji Sasaki (Japanese)
Canaletto is the main antagonist of the series. Also known as "The Timeless One". A dark, sinister being who first appears as a shadow with flaming red eyes and a raven head. It is shown that he once went on a crusade to destroy all life and create universal purification, thinking that life is a weakness, a mistake made by the Creators. Canaletto was the Avatar before Satis, but he refused to give up the title and so was imprisoned by the Great Beings. Feeling that he was wrongfully removed from his rightful throne, he intends to become the Avatar once again. Rick discovers a crest with his insignia, since he knew it was linked to the crash of his teams' star racer that left him unable to race again. He eventually tracks down Canaletto with the help of a shaman, but after his encounter, Canaletto erases all of his memories related to himself and all of the information he told him. Molly then finds the crest when Rick leaves it behind. Canaletto has been using Molly as his pawn for some time, killing her mother to give her motivation to participate in the Great Race, destroying the Whizzing Arrow I and injuring Rick so that she has to race in his place. He does all this because he knows she is the only racer that, if she won, would not want to be crowned as the Avatar, giving him the time to escape from the chains Satis put him in 10,000 years ago and reclaim his power.

The Avatar
Voiced by: Paul Dobson (English), Banjou Ginga (Japanese), Mathieu Barbier (French)
The Avatar is enigmatic, omnipresent, and seemingly omnipotent entity who organizes the "Great Race of Ōban" every 10,000 years, and grants the winner their wish, or so the competitors were led to believe. In "Revelations", the origins of Ōban are revealed. The planet is the first creation of almighty beings known as the Creators, who then went on to create the rest of the universe. However, they chose to give up their immortality, and so organized the great race of Ōban every 10,000 years, the winner of which would prove themselves as the strongest, fastest and most fit to be leader. The winner would not get one wish from the Ultimate Prize—they would instead become the new Avatar, the new guardian of the Creators' creation, until the next race.

=== Alwas Cycle ===
Grooor

Voiced by: Brian Dobson (English), Jin Horikawa (Japanese), Omar Yami (French)
A biomechanical racer who, along with his ship, seems to run on steam power. Violent and quick to anger, he does not suffer losing gracefully. After losing to the Earth Team, he seeks out Molly and starts a fight, intending to kill her. Though Jordan comes to help, it is Prince Aikka who defeats him (to save Molly). His sleek, Podracer-style craft is described as a "piece of junk", but is very resistant to damage, thanks to its polarised titanium exterior. It's also heavily armed, with a pair of missile launchers/projectile cannons on the fronts of the engines and a rapid-fire laser gun mounted on the cockpit. Grooor speaks about himself in third person, and has an odd tendency to shout his own name in battle.

Flint (フリント, Furinto)
Voiced by: Michael Dobson (English), Hitoshi Horikawa (Japanese), Laurent Maurel (French)
A pilot from Alwas, the host planet of the Great Race's preliminary matches. Somewhat arrogant and not quite as good as he seems; the judges fix the races for him, since he's the hometown favorite. He and his gunner, Marcel, pilot the Flying Fortress, a green star-racer that resembles a steam-powered train or tugboat. The two of them later confront Stan and Koji, who are looking for spare parts, and show them the location of a star-racer "graveyard". Flint reasons that if he can help the Earth Team reach Ōban, then he will have lost to the best team in the galaxy and that this would "restore" him in the eyes of his fans.

Ceres (セレス, Seresu)
The last surviving member of the Mong, a very ancient race. He resembles a hieroglyphic carving come to life, and his ship is a bizarre tangle of pipes that apparently functions via an unknown form of planetary magnetism. He could use this force to reflect enemy attacks back at them and also used a flute to create hallucinations. He could also use his staff to tap on the hollow pipes of his ship, creating destructive sound waves to use against enemies. Ceres was able to trap Molly within a hallucination during their race, until Rick was able to turn on her CD player, the loud rock music caused the illusion to shatter and Ceres to lose concentration and ultimately crash into a wall on the race track. He survived though, somehow, and is briefly glimpsed in Make Way!, waiting in line to return to his homeworld.

Para-dice (パラダイス, Para-daisu)
Voiced by: Jocelyn Loewen (English), Yuri Shiratori (Japanese), Johanna Menuteau (French)
A catlike, 12-year-old hacker prodigy from the planet Weta; trickery and sabotage are her main strategies, but she won't hesitate to blast an opponent off the course either. She controls her ship via a dynamic footpad, which resembles a Dance Dance Revolution platform. She sees the Great Race as nothing more than a game. It was Para-dice that reveals the 'true nature' of the Ultimate Prize to Molly during their race. She is a pink catlike creature with a cube-shaped head and a lime green and purple jumpsuit-style outfit. Though she speaks fluent English, she has the odd tendency to say "meow" frequently between sentences. She is seen again, briefly, in Make Way! when Eva runs to the docks looking for Rick.

Super Racer
A racer dressed as a superhero who turns out to be Satis in disguise, testing the other racers. He acts very cocky and usually makes eccentric poses. His ship is unique, it resembles an upright ring, with the cockpit on the top and a mouth with shark teeth painted on it. Two large metal balls come out of the center of the ring and rapidly orbit around the ship to prevent enemies from overtaking him. It has three short metal legs on the bottom that are used for a trotting/jumping start until the ship gains enough momentum to fly. There are also light laser cannons mounted on the nose.

Rush (ラッシュ, Rasshu)
Voiced by: Richard Newman (English), Kenji Nomura (Japanese)
A giant racer resembling a Viking who, despite his intimidating appearance, is a very friendly, good-natured person. His first appearance was in Hostilities Break Out when Molly nearly gets run over by his star-racer on her way to get fuel. He saves Molly from drowning after she becomes trapped inside flooding ruins. When asked why he was following them, he tells Molly and Jordan that he came to congratulate them on beating him in the race earlier that day. Apparently, on his planet the people are known for being optimistic and looking on the bright side of things. He then says his ram horn was half-full. Rush abandoned the race to duel Toros after it was revealed to him that he was the Crog who led the invasion of his home world Byrus. He lost both the duel and the race when Toros drove his ship into a bridge over the race course, burying him in a pile of rubble and knocking him out of the playoffs. Rush had wanted to use the Ultimate Prize to undo the damage that the Crogs had done to his home world. Rush's star-racer is made of a unique metal from his homeworld that is nigh-unbreakable. However, it is also faster than it looks, thanks to its powerful magma-fueled engines. Rush sits atop his racer, controlling it and its two extendable arms with a pair of circular control yokes.

Spirit (スピリット, Supiritto)
Ambassador of the Fills; a mysterious, polymorphic, shadowy being. Ten years earlier he raced against Molly’s mother, Maya. Near the end of the race Maya’s ship crashed and exploded. Molly and her father since that day have believed that Spirit had intentionally killed Maya. During a race against Molly that ended in Molly crashing her ship trying to kill Spirit, Spirit showed an unconscious Molly what really happened to her mother; Spirit noticed Maya's vehicle was leaking and wanted to stop the race, but Maya pushed him to keep going indicating to him everything was okay before the explosion took place. Spirit then left to finish the race, but not before shedding a tear implying he felt guilty for the death of Maya. He is eliminated at the end of the playoffs by Prince Aikka. He utilises his polymorphic shapeshifting powers to transform into a birdlike creature that can easily match any star-racer's speed.

Colonel Toros (トロス大佐, Torosu Taisa)
Voiced by: Brian Drummond (English), Banjō Ginga (Japanese), Mathieu Barbier (French)
Colonel of the Crog Imperium and younger brother of the Crog leader. The Crogs are the sinister alien race that threatened to destroy Earth 25 years ago. He is determined to obtain the Ultimate Prize in order to enslave the entire galaxy under Crog rule. Toros was also the leader of the Crog force that decimated Rush's homeworld of Byrus, transforming it from a paradise into a polluted wasteland. Seemingly unbeatable, he is finally handed a defeat during his rematch against Molly when he crashes against the starting gate in a game of "chicken", but still advances to the Grand Finals. During the course of the Alwas playoffs, his first racer, a standard Crog Trident, was damaged during his race with Rush. It was replaced just before his rematch with Molly with an upgraded model, sporting more curvaceous and intimidating blades and a two-stage Hyper Drive similar to the Earth Team's Whizzing Arrow III. Despite having the best record on Alwas, Toros' single '"unacceptable'" loss to the Earth Team results in him being replaced as the Crog's pilot on Oban by General Kross. Kross states that he "Gave his head willingly to the Crog Imperium", hinting that Toros may have been executed by his own request, unable to bear that he lost to the Earth Team.

=== Ōban Cycle ===
Sul
Voiced by: Keiji Fujiwara (Japanese)
A 'magician' known across the galaxy with telekinetic superpowers that are rumored to equal those of the Avatar himself. Sul shows little emotion and rarely reacts to the other pilots unless attacked. He does not actually use a star-racer during the competition, instead he surrounds himself with glowing, diamond-shaped energy fields conjured and controlled by his mind. He states that he desires the Ultimate Prize because as the "master of space, time, and even the course of destiny", there is nothing else for him to wish for. He dominates the first four races on Oban before being eliminated by Canaletto as his ability to alter destiny threatened to ruin his carefully laid plans. It is possible that he still survived; Canaletto wasn't strong enough to kill him, instead arranging for the powerful being to be drawn through an inter-dimensional portal, where he possibly continued to exist.

Ning and Skun
Voiced by: Jillian Michaels and Colleen Wheeler (English), Ai Orikasa and Tomoko Hiratsuji (Japanese)
Two very proud and aggressive creatures from the destroyed planet Inna; their race is made up of females only. Their star-racer is distinctive in that it is actually two ships that fly in tandem, but are capable of combining to form a more powerful craft. After combining their ships, they gain the ability to use an extremely powerful heat-seeking plasma cannon. Their star-racers are rectangle-shaped, red with a black border and, when it is two separate racers, are driven like motorcycles. The short-haired of the two, Skun, can make her fingernails grow into very long claws. She is also extremely strong, tearing a hole in the Arrow III's hull with her bare hands in the episode Nervous Like Ning & Skun. They want the ultimate prize to reunite their people, who are scattered throughout the galaxy. In the episode "Canaletto's revenge" the sisters challenge Kross for the last gate. Although it is never seen, the battle is witnessed from afar by Molly, and the fact Kross emerges victorious, emphasizes their demise. This proves to be false when in the final episode both are shown to have survived. Though Ning and Skun are known to be fierce, they also have a deep bond of loyalty to each other, as shown when deciding to compete to be the next Avatar, they didn't want to be separated. And when they were about to ambush Kross, told each other they had no regrets and that "whatever happens, I'm glad it was with you". In the Ōban Star-Racers artbook, it's said that Ning and Skun are close like lovers.

Lord Furter
Voiced by: Don Brown (English), Tetsuo Gotō (Japanese)
Captain of a space galleon, as bad-tempered as he is egocentric. He is easily recognizable due to him being the smallest in stature of all the racers, as well as his habit of keeping his very large tongue hanging outside his mouth, having at first the appearance of a scarf or ascot. Being a self-proclaimed pirate, he only sees the Ultimate Prize as a treasure to be claimed. After the race is over, his crew members return to where they came from and are assumed to continue their careers as pirates, but Furter himself is conspicuously absent. His star-racer is a large, slow, pirate ship-shaped vehicle armed with 4 cannons, capable of firing either energized cannon balls or tow cables. It also carries a pair of powerful (if rather slow-firing) guns hidden in its masts. Furter's crew can usually be seen running about the deck, going about their duties and panicking when shot at. The vessel was destroyed by Kross in the episode "Canaletto's Revenge" when he rammed his star-racer into it, splitting it in two before it exploded; all the crew escaped, but Lord Furter tried to prove his loyalty to his ship by not abandoning it, though at the last moment he has a change of heart and flees just as his ship explodes.

General Kross
Voiced by: Brian Dobson (English), Shōzō Iizuka (Japanese)
General of the Crog Imperium. He replaces Toros as the Crog's representative on Ōban, because Toros' loss to the Earth Team in the last race of the playoffs was "unacceptable". Even more intimidating than Toros, Kross has a distinctive crescent-shaped scar over his left eye and has four ears compared to Toros' two. Kross pilots a much stronger version of the Crog Trident, the starfighter used by Toros on Alwas; his is equipped with more cutting blades, and a fixed bow weapons pod that fire sicklelike laser bolts, a large laser sword, and can fire heat-seeking energy torpedoes. After revealing the true nature of the Ultimate Prize to the Crog Senate, they make him their Supreme Ruler. Kross stalks and attempts to eliminate all the pilots during the last race of the competition. In the end, it comes down to a sprint between him and Molly. Kross attempts to land on top of Molly and cut her racer in two, but a last-second maneuver by Molly sends Kross's fighter plowing into the ground. Kross' last words are a surprised curse of "By Kramm" as his fighter crashes and explodes with him in it.

Ondai
Voiced by: Trevor Devall (English), Hideo Watanabe (Japanese)
Ondai is a robot that looks like a cylinder that walks on three flat metal legs. Very analytical and constantly running calculations, but is also known to have a sarcastic and narcissistic personality. Ondai's star-racer is capable of transforming into a humanoid mech armed with a pair of energy swords and a battery of missile launchers. He may sometimes get carried away with calculations when too many things around him are mathematically possible, causing him to go into a state of awe, as was exemplified in Optimized Like Ondai. His constant putting-down of living creatures would make one think that he would wish for machines to reign supreme, but this could not be further from the truth; he actually envies organic beings. As a robot, he cannot feel the sensations of touch or warmth, which he longs for. Constant study of living creatures has done nothing, so he hopes that the Ultimate Prize will do that which science cannot; make him flesh and blood, or at least let him feel. His star-racer (in robot mode) was disabled by Prince Aikka in the final race, and he is not seen again.

O
The tallest of the nine Oban pilots, he resembles a large upside down teardrop with stubby legs and one large eye in the middle. He appears to "pilot" a large, bizarre, organic construct that looks similar to a jellyfish of some sort. In 'Ominous Like O', Kross fired a laser at him, and he absorbed the shot and fired it back in a giant wave of light which damaged the Arrow III, causing it to crash at the bottom of the seemingly bottomless canyon. O is also able to transform into a larger, bulkier humanoid form with arms that somewhat resemble the heads of killer whales. In "Canaletto's Revenge", it is revealed that O was present when Satis first sealed Canaletto away - Satis begs O for his help to destroy Canaletto, as alone he could only neutralize his powers. However, O left instead, with Satis calling after him "O, don't leave, come back!" Thinking back to this during the last race, a guilt-ridden O chooses to settle in a crater rather than attempt to finish. After Canaletto is freed, O rushes to help Molly, Jordan and Prince Aikka and follows them to the Temple of the Heart, where he protects them from two giant guardians controlled by Canaletto before being killed by them. His unique energy absorption abilities allowed him to take the guardians down with him, consuming them in an enormous explosion that disintegrated all three of them.

Muir
A large crustacean alien with a heavy, armored shell and large pincers, as well as telepathic tentacles. Molly and Jordan initially mistook it for a native Ōban life form. Prince Aikka comments that it's not normally aggressive unless provoked. Muir flies in what appears to be a giant, flying horseshoe crab, with claws and tentacles similar to its own, and a strange retractable fin in the back that discharges energy spheres. In Monstrous Like Muir, Molly discovers that she isn't the only one who wants to bring back a loved one; Muir's mate was killed by alien hunters who wanted her tentacles and left her for dead and it hopes to win the Great Race to bring her back to life. While racing, Muir sits atop a large, liquid-filled globe, containing the body of its mate. It is also revealed that the tentacles on Muir's back allow it to communicate telepathically and appear to be highly prized as a hunting trophy. Muir chooses not to take part in the final race after learning the Avatar doesn't have the power to resurrect his mate. After the race ended he returned to his home planet.

== Development ==
Dissatisfied with his previous experiences as a screenwriter in the animation industry, Savin Yeatman-Eiffel wanted to create a distinctive kind of show, one that would revive the type of emotions he had felt as a kid watching the classic Japanese anime series of the 70s. In short, he wanted to stress the emotional side of his characters and story, something that he felt had totally disappeared from Western animation productions. Working on that idea, he created his own company "Sav! The World Productions", which released in 2001 a short movie entitled Molly, Star-Racer, produced in part by Sparx Animation Studios and set to a Y&Co. remix of Ayumi Hamasaki songs. The trailer already showed a mix of 3D and 2D though at the time 3D was still predominant. It featured many of the characters with unfinalized designs including Jordan, Don Wei, Maya, Aikka, Satis, Toros, Sül, Ondai, Ning & Skun, Furter and of course, Molly racing across various places in the Oban landscape featured later in the series. This short movie won the 2001 LEAF Awards and was nominated for best editing in the 2002 Imagina Awards. Leaked on the internet, it quickly became extremely popular among animation fans, generating hundreds of thousands of downloads on various sites - a rarity at the time. The pilot is produced using Alias Wavefront Maya 3D software.

In spite of the success of the trailer, the search for financing for the series was a long process since Yeatman-Eiffel had a clear vision of where he wanted to take the show - more realistic and more emotional than the original trailer - and refused to negotiate with a party that would have tried to bend or change the artistic choices at a later stage (including, as was offered to him by an important North American production company to change the main character into a boy). Savin was also dead set on producing the series in Tokyo in collaboration with Japanese animators. This was the best choice according to him technically and a logical one too in view of the inspirations that had fuelled the creation of the series.

Savin Yeatman-Eiffel succeeded in the end, involving major financial partners like Disney and Bandai without surrendering his control of the artistic elements. But it took him a total of nine years to complete the series from initial idea to delivery of the final episode (the concept was created in 1997, with initial production having begun in Paris in 2000, moving to Tokyo three years later).

While this is Sav! The World's first TV series, the company has previously existed as a maker of various short films (including the aforementioned Molly, Star-Racer). Yeatman-Eiffel originally wrote the show's scripts in English and would adapt them into French, with that audio track being recorded first. The English version was recorded by Airwaves Sound Design in Vancouver, Canada - the voice director for the series is Michael Donovan. Yeatman-Eiffel flew to Vancouver and was directly involved in its production.

== Music ==
The musical score is composed by Taku Iwasaki. The series has one official soundtrack consisting of 20 tracks available only through the official site which include extended versions of "Chance To Shine" and other music. The 15th Anniversary Blu-ray Kickstarter project rewards included downloads for 50 tracks of the soundtrack, which released for download to backers April 5, 2022. The full soundtrack of the series comprises 85 tracks.

The opening and ending theme songs were composed by Yoko Kanno (of Macross Plus, Escaflowne and Cowboy Bebop fame). In the US broadcast, the opening theme song was replaced by an original rock oriented theme song entitled "Never Say Never", which was also used for international broadcasts outside of Europe when Disney XD launched in February 2009. The closing song had also been replaced during the first broadcasts, but now features "Waratteta", the original closing song is composed by Yoko Kanno. This is the first song to retain its original Japanese lyrics to be featured on Jetix USA. European broadcasts feature a remixed version of "Chance to Shine", but replaced the ending theme with an instrumental version of the opening theme. The German and French broadcast used respectively a German and a French version of "Chance to Shine". The lyrics of the French version, titled "Envole-toi vers l'infini", were written by Oban creator Savin Yeatman-Eiffel.

Opening Themes

- "Chance To Shine" (or "A Chance To Shine") by AKINO - Used for most international broadcasts and the Blu-ray-Disc release. A French version performed by Christèle Labonne, titled "Envole toi vers l'infini" (Fly to Infinity), was used in France, and a remixed version of the Japanese version was used for European broadcasts outside of France.
- "Never Say Never" by After Midnight Project - Used for the North American broadcast.

Ending Theme

- "Waratteta" (笑ってた; lit We Were Laughing) by Sukoshi and Yoko Kanno - International and U.S. broadcast
- Instrumental of "Chance To Shine" (Remix) - European broadcast

== Awards and nominations ==
Molly Star-Racer (pilot film)

- LAEF AWARD - London Animation and Effects Festival 2001
- Nominated for Best editing - Imagina Awards 2002

Ōban Star-Racers

- Animeland Award of the Best non-Japanese Animation Series of 2006 – Grand Prix Animeland 2007 (awarded by the readers of France's biggest animation/manga magazine, Animeland).
- Grand Prix du Divertissement Eurojap Award – Polymanga 2007 (awarded by one of Europe's largest anime convention, Polymanga)
- Nominated for Best Animated Series – British Academy Children's Awards 2007 (BAFTA is essentially the UK equivalent of the American OSCARS and Emmies combined)

== Media & merchandise ==
An art book including a presentation of the Ōban universe & characters, as well as an interview of the creator on the development and production process of the series in Paris and Tokyo, was published in France in March 2009 by publisher Carabas. An English version of the art book was released by Titan Books in November 2009. A novel adaptation was also published in France at the end of 2008 by publisher Hachette.

A vinyl collector figure of Molly (8 inch) has been released by Muttpop in June 2008. Several special limited editions have followed since.

Volume 1 of an original soundtrack for the series is also on sale, as well as two series of three collectible T-shirts available from the Oban Fan Shop. The full version of "Waratteta" was included on Yoko Kanno & The Seatbelts's album, "Space Bio Charge", released on May 27, 2009.

An Ōban Star-Racers flash based panEuropean multiplayer game was created by Little Loud in 2006 and was a Flash Forward Finalist. A mobile phone game, produced by Sav! The World, was made by award-winning game studio DeValley Entertainment. A PC game developed by Sky Isle Studios, titled Ōban Star-Racers: Chance to Shine, is currently in development. The studio previously released an Ōban Star-Racers-themed game titled Ōban Dreams within the Dreams game creation software for PlayStation 4 on December 4, 2021, which attracted Oban's creator's Attention.

During Ōban Star-Racers's 15th Anniversary event held in Paris on December 4, 2021, Sav! The World announced it would launch a Kickstarter campaign for a region-free Blu-Ray release of the series. The campaign ran between February 1 and March 8, 2022, meeting its initial target of €30,000 within an hour and raising a total of €377,056 (approximatively 410,000 US dollars). The blu-rays were released at the beginning of 2023 in both regular and collector editions. Both versions include all 26 episodes restored in their original 1080p, 24 frames per second, 4/3 format (never released until now); 11 original dubs (French 5.1, English 5.1, Japanese, German, Russian, Latin Spanish, Latin Portuguese, Italian, Dutch, Turkish and Polish); English and French subtitle, and numerous bonuses. The collector Edition presents the 5 discs in a 5 panel Digipak together with a 120 pages hardcover mini artbook, collector cards and a poster. A limited numbered edition also included additional digital rewards as well as a pin and a collectible 15th anniversary medal.

=== Home media ===
Two volumes of French-language DVDs have been released by WildSide Vidéo long with a limited edition full series box set.

In the United Kingdom, the series was released by Liberation Entertainment, and was split into two two-disc DVD sets based on each arc - The Alwas Cycle, released on July 30, 2007, and The Oban Cycle, released in 2008.

In the United States the series has been released on DVD by Shout! Factory and the first episode appeared as a bonus sneak peek on the company's DVD release of Medabots season one. The US release contains the uncut episodes in English, similar in content to those found on the French DVD release (several edits were made for the US Jetix TV release). The series has also been released on DVD in the United Kingdom, Germany, Denmark and the Netherlands by other companies.

== Possible sequel and spin-off ==
During a series of Ōban Star-Racers related events at the Japan Tours Festival at the end of February 2017, creator Savin Yeatman-Eiffel indicated he was working on a potential sequel and spin-off with co-director Thomas Romain. In a Twitter post on March 2, 2017, Yeatman-Eiffel later posted concept art showing the characters of Molly and Prince Aikka as young adults.

During Oban's 15th Anniversary Event was held in Paris on December 4, 2021 Savin Yeatman-Eiffel presented for the first time the stories and designs of the sequels currently in development and discussed them with the audience. A featurette of the 2023 Blu-ray describes in more details the different paths explored by the team.

The secondary objective of the successful Blu-ray Kickstarter campaign launched in February 2022 was to secure funding for more development for these new "Oban related projects" as well as show potential investors the support of the Oban community for these projects.
