= List of Ōban Star-Racers episodes =

This is a list of episodes for the French animated series Ōban Star-Racers.

No.	Title	Directed by	Written by	Storyboarded by	Original release date
1	"A Fresh Start" ("Un nouveau départ"); Transliteration: "Arata na shuppatsu" (Japanese: 新たな出発)	Kiyoko Sayama	Savin Yeatman-Eiffel	Yoshimitsu Ōhashi	June 5, 2006
Twenty-five years after a mysterious being called 'The Avatar' averted war between Earth and the Crogs, Earth is invited to participate in "The Great Race of Ōban", a competition held once every 10,000 years. Meanwhile, a young girl escapes from her boarding school on a journey to find the father she hasn't seen in a decade.
2	"Hostilities Break Out" ("Les hostilités commencent"); Transliteration: "Sentō kaishi" (Japanese: 戦闘開始)	Harume Kosaka; Junichi Watanabe	Savin Yeatman-Eiffel	Yoshimitsu Ōhashi; Kiyoko Sayama	June 5, 2006
The 'Earth Team' arrives on Alwas, site of the preliminaries and discovers that Eva, who calls herself 'Molly', has accompanied them. With no time to argue, the team competes in their first race, but disaster strikes when their star-racer explodes at the finish line. With their star pilot, Rick, out of commission and no replacements, is the Great Race already over for them?
3	"Grave Like Groor" ("Guerrier comme Groor"); Transliteration: "Majime na Gurōa" (Japanese: 真面目なグローア)	Harume Kosaka	Savin Yeatman-Eiffel	Shōgo Kōmoto; Yoshimitsu Ōhashi	June 12, 2006
With no lead pilot, the Earth Team desperately searches for a replacement, that is until Molly jumps into the pilot seat and enters the next race. Even though she wins, Don Wei, blinded by his own pride, accuses her of humiliating him, and announces his intentions to withdraw from the tournament.
4	"In Like Flint" ("Flamboyant comme Flint"); Transliteration: "Ninkimono Furinto" (Japanese: 人気者フリント)	Masahiko Watanabe	Savin Yeatman-Eiffel	Christophe Kourita	June 19, 2006
Molly is attacked by Groor after winning their race, but thanks to some assistance from Prince Aikka, is able to make it to the next race. The race, it seems, is fixed to be in favor of hometown hero, Flint, but the tables turn and Molly wins. Later, Don Wei learns that Rick has now recovered.
5	"Cruel Like Ceres" ("Cruel comme Cérès"); Transliteration: "Reitetsu Seresu" (Japanese: 冷徹セレス)	Yoshinori Odaka	Savin Yeatman-Eiffel	Kiyoko Sayama; Yoshimitsu Ōhashi	June 26, 2006
Rick recovers from the accident and becomes the lead pilot again, but something is wrong. While racing against Ceres, his muscles seize up and he is unable to control his hands or see clearly. Molly notices this, and races to catch up to the Arrow 2 to help Rick pilot. After the race is over, Rick is told he can never race again.
6	"Playful Like Para-Dice" ("Piquée comme Para-Dice"); Transliteration: "Ochame ni Paradaisu" (Japanese: おちゃめにパラダイス)	Masahiko Watanabe	Savin Yeatman-Eiffel	Shōgo Kōmoto; Christophe Kourita	July 10, 2006
Molly is now chosen to take Rick's place as the new driver. However, the team's racer is sabotaged by Paradice, a cat-like creature who views The Great Race of Ōban as nothing more than a game. After a quick repair, they race against each other, and Molly inadvertently learns about the ultimate prize from Paradice.
7	"Treacherous Like Toros" ("Traître comme Toros"); Transliteration: "Kiken na Torosu" (Japanese: 危険なトロス)	Nanako Shimazaki	Savin Yeatman-Eiffel	Nanako Shimazaki	July 17, 2006
While Rick searches for answers about who sabotaged the team's first racer, Molly races in the preliminary semi-finals against a commanding officer in the Crog army. The experience later proves to be disastrous as the Crog not only beats them easily, but destroys their racer in the process.
8	"Agile Like Aikka" ("Agile comme Aikka"); Transliteration: "Genki na Aika" (Japanese: 元気なアイカ)	Masahiko Watanabe	Savin Yeatman-Eiffel	Christophe Kourita	July 24, 2006
Molly and Aikka agree to a cease fire for their match, but Don Wei and Jordan think it would be better to take Aikka out. The race goes well at first with Molly keeping Jordan locked inside his turret, but near the end of the race, Jordan finally shoots at Aikka. Angering by this 'betrayal', Aikka retaliates, totally disabling the Arrow. The Prince loses all respect for Molly and her kind, and Molly, Jordan, and Don's bond is further severed.
9	"Surprising Like Super Racer" ("Surprenant comme Super Racer"); Transliteration: "Odoroki no Sūpā Rēsā" (Japanese: 驚きのスーパーレーサー)	Harume Kosaka	Savin Yeatman-Eiffel	Shōgo Kōmoto	July 31, 2006
Unable to reach Molly, who has shut herself up in her room, Don Wei decides to have Rick personally train her. Meanwhile, Jordan confirms a long-standing rumor, and then they race a familiar opponent.
10	"Resistant Like Rush" ("Robuste comme Rush"); Transliteration: "Shibutoi Rasshu" (Japanese: しぶといラッシュ)	Hiroshi Kuruo	Savin Yeatman-Eiffel	Hiroshi Kuruo	August 7, 2006
Molly races Rush in a contest of marksmanship, seeing who can destroy the most targets. Meanwhile, Don Wei reveals his past to Rick, finally shedding light on how he became what he is today and why he 'abandoned' Eva.
11	"Silent Like Spirit" ("Silencieux comme Spirit"); Transliteration: "Chinmoku no Supiritto" (Japanese: 沈黙のスピリット)	Harume Kosaka	Savin Yeatman-Eiffel	Takeshi Mori	August 14, 2006
With the finals slowly approaching The Earth Team prepares for its next race against Spirit. Upon seeing his face, both Don and Molly are horrified at the revelation that this racer may be connected to the race that led to the death of Maya, Molly's mom and Don's wife, years ago. During the race, Molly's focus is terribly blinded by sheer hatred, until the truth is finally revealed on two fronts.
12	"The Will to Win" ("Le cœur au ventre"); Transliteration: "Shōri e no ishi" (Japanese: 勝利への意志)	Satoshi Ōsedo	Savin Yeatman-Eiffel	Kiyoko Sayama	August 21, 2006
Stan and Koji desperately search for spare parts to rebuild the Arrow II before the next race. Molly contemplates her future should she win the Ultimate Prize. Elsewhere, Rick finally comes face-to-face with the "Timeless One".
13	"Make Way!" ("Dernière ligne droite"); Transliteration: "Zenshin!" (Japanese: 前進！)	Masahiko Watanabe	Savin Yeatman-Eiffel	Shōgo Kōmoto	August 28, 2006
It's do-or-die time for The Earth Team. To reach Ōban they must win their last race in a rematch against Toros. Piloting a rebuilt Arrow with a new, untested hyperdrive, Molly must summon all her courage to face the vile Crog and pull out a win...or risk losing everything.
14	"Welcome to Oban" ("Bienvenue sur Oban"); Transliteration: "Yōkoso Ōban e!" (Japanese: ようこそオーバンへ！)	Masahiko Watanabe	Savin Yeatman-Eiffel	Christophe Kourita; Hiroshi Kuruo	September 11, 2006
Finally the Earth Team has made it to Ōban, site of the grand finals. Before proper introductions are made, the races immediately get underway. With new and old rivals to face, a new "points" rule, and no time to study the courses, things are bound to be interesting for Molly and Co. as the true race for the Ultimate Prize begins.
15	"Fierce Like Lord Furter" ("Furieux comme Lord Furter"); Transliteration: "Kyōbō na Fātā-kyō" (Japanese: 凶暴なファーター卿)	Tōru Yoshida	Savin Yeatman-Eiffel	Sōichi Masui	September 18, 2006
As the second race of the finals approaches, Molly and Jordan have caught the attention of Lord Furter, a self-described pirate. The crude little alien prides himself on winning, by eliminating his opponents before the start of each race, and the Earth Team is his next target.
16	"Nervous Like Ning and Skun" ("Nerveuses comme Ning et Skun"); Transliteration: "Shinkeishitsu na Nin to Sukun" (Japanese: 神経質なニンとスクン)	Masahiko Watanabe	Savin Yeatman-Eiffel	Sōichi Masui	September 25, 2006
Facing both internal and external conflicts, Molly races hard to win her team some points and it looks like she may actually pull it off. However, her hopes are short-lived when two dangerous sisters take it upon themselves to 'educate' the humans in true racing.
17	"Optimised Like Ondai" ("Optimisé comme Ondaï"); Transliteration: "Reiketsukan Ondai" (Japanese: 冷血漢オンダイ)	Harume Kosaka	Savin Yeatman-Eiffel	Sōichi Masui	October 2, 2006
Molly vows to win the next race, but a mechanical racer has other plans. Meanwhile, the plot thickens when Don Wei learns that his daughter, Eva, has run away from her school. How long until he finally realizes that Molly and Eva are one and the same?
18	"Monstrous Like Muir" ("Monstrueux comme Muir"); Transliteration: "Kaibutsu Muīru" (Japanese: 怪物ムイール)	Harume Kosaka	Savin Yeatman-Eiffel	Sōichi Masui	October 16, 2006
The Earth Team has finally begun to catch up in the rankings. Molly comes face-to-face with a racer, whose desire for the Ultimate Prize may not be so different from her own. Finally faced with the reality that Molly is his long-estranged daughter, Don Wei is conflicted by his desire to protect her and his responsibility to win at all costs.
19	"The Origin of the World" ("L'origine du monde"); Transliteration: "Sekai no kigen" (Japanese: 世界の起源)	Harume Kosaka	Savin Yeatman-Eiffel	Makoto Takeichi	October 30, 2006
With his parents captured by the Crogs, Prince Aikka cannot afford friendship to jeopardize the lives of his people, and so warns Molly to stay away from him on the racetrack. Meanwhile, as fascinating new facts about Ōban's power are revealed, the being known as Canaletto plots his next move.
20	"Secret Like Sul" ("Secret comme Sul"); Transliteration: "Suru no himitsu" (Japanese: スルの秘密)	Satoshi Ōsedo	Savin Yeatman-Eiffel	Kiyoko Sayama	November 6, 2006
Molly discovers a conspiracy by other racers to take Sul out of the competition, but struggles with how she should use this information: Stay quiet and take the opportunity to advance in the rankings, or inform Sul and give up any hope of catching the overall points leader. At the same time, Canaletto begins to set his own plans in motion.
21	"Ominous Like O" ("Omniscient comme O"); Transliteration: "Bukimi na Ō" (Japanese: 不気味なオー)	Masahiko Watanabe	Savin Yeatman-Eiffel	Takeshi Mori	November 20, 2006
With the end of the grand finals approaching, Don Wei confesses that he knows Molly's true identity, and finally reveals why he left her behind ten years earlier, but Molly is not ready to make amends just yet. During the next race, a vicious attack by another racer results in a terrifying crash that may finally spell the end of the Earth Team's pursuit of the Ultimate Prize.
22	"Revelations" ("Révélations"); Transliteration: "Shin jijitsu" (Japanese: 新事実)	Harume Kosaka	Savin Yeatman-Eiffel	Sōichi Masui	November 27, 2006
After crashing and becoming stranded due to the attack of another racer, Molly and Jordan try to make their way across Ōban to catch up with the temple before the start of the next race. Along the way they encounter the beings that created Ōban, and learn a terrifying secret about the true nature of the Ultimate Prize; One that could rob Molly of any chance of bringing back her mother.
23	"Cruel Like Kross" ("Un nouveau départ"); Transliteration: "Zannin na Kurosu" (Japanese: 残忍なクロス)	Masahiko Watanabe	Savin Yeatman-Eiffel	Sōichi Masui	December 8, 2006
Molly's dream has been shattered by the revelation of the Ultimate Prize's true nature. A friend's shocking, true identity only adds to her confusion. With her goal gone, she wonders if there is any point in finishing the race. However, the realization of what it would mean if the Crogs gained the Ultimate Prize spurs her to set out for one final race...a race that could decide the fate of the galaxy.
24	"Canaletto's Revenge" ("La revanche de Canaletto"); Transliteration: "Kanaretto no fukushū" (Japanese: カナレットの復讐)	Masahiko Watanabe	Savin Yeatman-Eiffel	Sōichi Masui; Yoshimitsu Ōhashi	December 11, 2006
The final race has arrived and the stakes couldn't be higher. Kross, having learned the Ultimate Prize's true nature, goes on a rampage taking down all racers in his path. In the end, all that stands in his way is Molly. When the smoke clears and the race is concluded, a fateful decision by the victor unleashes an evil that should have never been set free.
25	"Unlikely Alliances" ("Le triomphe de Canaletto"); Transliteration: "Omoi mo kakenu dōmei" (Japanese: 思いもかけぬ同盟)	Harume Kosaka	Savin Yeatman-Eiffel	Sōichi Masui	December 11, 2006
Canaletto is free and determined to regain his lost power. The remaining racers join forces in order to stop the powerful being from achieving his goal. However, Canaletto will not go down so easily and unleashes his dark minions to destroy them. The fate of the galaxy hangs in the balance and one racer makes the ultimate sacrifice to ensure victory.
26	"The Moment of Truth" ("Le moment de vérité"); Transliteration: "Shinjitsu no toki" (Japanese: 真実のとき)	Kiyoko Sayama	Savin Yeatman-Eiffel	Kiyoko Sayama	December 11, 2006
The Great Race comes to a surprising and powerful end. Old grudges and past wrongs are finally forgiven. Ōban is reborn as a new Avatar steps forward. And a young girl faces a new, brighter future with her father.

== See also ==
- Ōban Star-Racers
