= Akif Pirinçci =

Turkish-born German writer (born 1959)

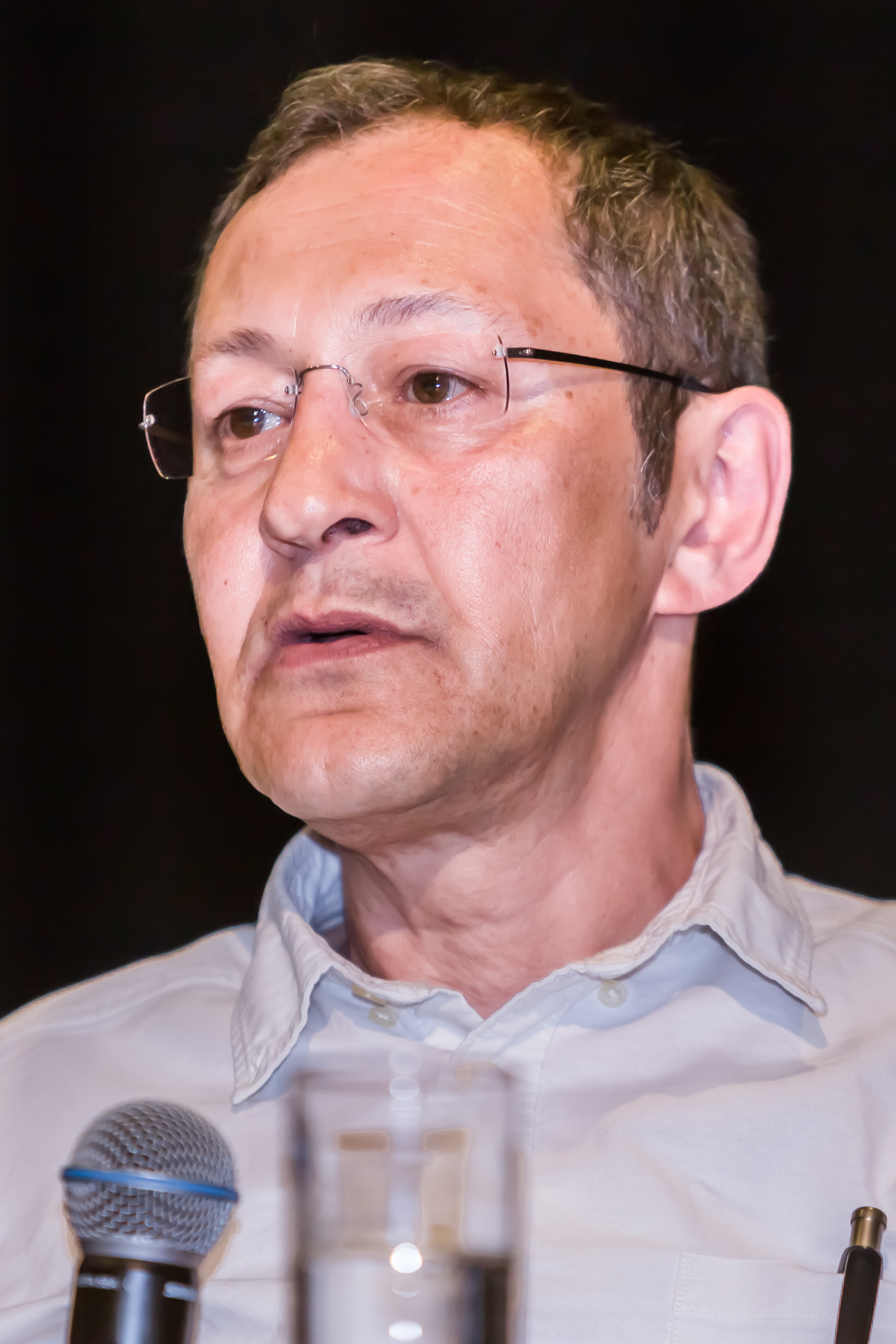
- Pirinçci in 2014
- Born: 20 October 1959 (age 67); Istanbul, Turkey
- Occupations: Novelist, screenwriter
- Writing career
- Subjects: Murder mystery, thriller, crime fiction, detective
- Notable work: Felidae

Akif Pirinçci (Turkish pronunciation: [aːˈkif piɾintʃˈdʒi]; born 20 October 1959) is a Turkish-born German writer who is best known internationally for his novel Felidae. After a highly controversial speech for the Pegida movement in 2015, he had his contracts cancelled and works delisted by his publishers, Amazon and most booksellers in Germany.

== Political activity ==
=== Relationship with right-wing organisations ===
While writing and publishing these non-fiction essays, Pirinçci also increasingly came in contact with functionaries of the anti-Islamic movement Pegida, the right-wing populist party Alternative for Germany, and the small right-wing German Freedom Party, who organized lecture tours where Pirinçci would read from his two political essay books. When he faced criticism in May 2014, he justified these contacts by telling the online blog of the newspaper Die Zeit "I don't give a flying fuck if people call me a Nazi, I don't give a damn." ("Es geht mir am Arsch vorbei, wenn man mich einen Nazi nennt, das ist mir scheißegal").

=== Defamation suit ===
On 20 January 2015, the local paper General-Anzeiger reported that Pirinçci had been found liable for defamation in a civil suit brought by a professor of sociology and biology, whom Pirinçci had described as a "mentally sick, manic queer with a screw loose" ("geisteskranken, durchgeknallten Schwulen mit Dachschaden"). Pirinçci had also described the professor's theories as a "jewel of stupidity" ("Juwel der Doofheit").

=== 2015 Pegida speech ===
At the first anniversary of the Pegida protests in Dresden on 19 October 2015, Pirinçci was invited as keynote speaker. He accused German politicians of being "Gauleiter against their own people" and called Germany's government a "shit state" ("Scheißstaat"). Further, according to Pirinçci, Muslims want to "pump infidels full of their Muslim juice" ("Ungläubige mit ihrem Moslemsaft vollpumpen") and stated that Germany is becoming a "Muslim garbage dump" ("Moslemmüllhalde"). He called the German Green Party a "Party of child fuckers" ("Kinderfickerpartei"), and the spokesperson for the mosque in Erfurt a "Muslim guy with a Taliban beard" ("Moslemfritzen mit Talibanbart"), who had as much to do with German culture as "my asshole with the production of perfume" ("wie mein Arschloch mit Parfümherstellung").

However, the most-widely spread quote from Pirinçci's 19 October speech was, "Unfortunately, the concentration camps are out of order at the moment!" ("Aber die KZs sind ja leider derzeit außer Betrieb!"), which was met with applause from the crowd. In a wider context, Pirinçci's concentration camps statement was intended to accuse critics of Pegida of intending to send Pegida members to said concentration camps. Pirinçci's remarks were apparently deemed too offensive by the crowd, and was booed off the stage.

Within 24 hours after first quotes from Pirinçci's Pegida speech appeared in the media, his publishers Goldmann and Random House issued statements that they had cancelled their contracts with Pirinçci and would no longer sell any of his books, and the webmaster to his online blog also cancelled Pirinçci's contract. At the same time, Amazon Germany chose to de-list his books so they can't be found through searches or ordered through the website. A few days later, all relevant book wholesalers in Germany (Libri, Umbreit, and KNV) also stopped ordering his books, and many independent bookstores issued statements that they would refuse to order his books, even upon request. This reaction by bookstores was criticized by columnist Jan Fleischhauer in Der Spiegel as amounting to authoritarian censorship. Volker Beck, member of parliament for the German Green Party, filed charges against Pirinçci for public incitement to commit criminal acts and incitement to hatred. A spokesperson for the federal prosecutor's office confirmed that an investigation is ongoing.

Two weeks after his Pegida speech, Pirinçci told Der Spiegel that the boycott of all his books overnight (except for the two political essay collections at Manufactum) as well as his public notoriety resulting from the affair made him seriously consider emigration.

=== Conviction ===
In February 2024, Pirinçci was "sentenced to nine months in prison without probation for incitement to hatred in the Bonn district court."

== List of literary works ==
- Tränen sind immer das Ende (1980)
- Der Rumpf (literally meaning "the torso") (1992)
- Yin (1997)
- The Back Door (German: Die Damalstür) (2001)
- Der letzte Weltuntergang: Krimi-Erzählungen ("The Final Apocalypse") (2007)
- Volltreffer (2011), written under the pseudonym Cedric Arnold

=== Felidae ===
1. Felidae (German: Felidae) (1989)
2. Felidae II aka Felidae on the Road (German: Francis. Felidae II) (1993)
3. Cave Canem (1999)
4. Das Duell ("the duel") (2002)
5. Salve Roma! (2004)
6. Schandtat (2007)
7. Felipolis (2010)
8. Göttergleich (2014)

Felidae animated movie (script) (1994)

== List of non-fiction works ==
- Cat Sense (2011)
- Deutschland von Sinnen: Der irre Kult um Frauen, Homosexuelle und Zuwanderer (2014) (Germany Gone Mad: The Crazy Cult around Women, Homosexuals and Immigrants)
