= Sav! The World Productions =

French animation studio

- Type: Limited company
- Industry: Anime, Film, Television
- Founded: 1998; 28 years ago in Paris, France
- Founder: Savin Yeatman-Eiffel
- Headquarters: Paris, France
- Products: Anime, Film, Television
- Website: www.savtheworld.com

Sav! The World Productions is a French production company, mainly active in the field of animation, formed in 1998 by writer-director Savin Yeatman-Eiffel.

== Oban Star-Racers ==
STW is mainly known to the general public for its award-winning hit series Ōban Star-Racers (26 half-hours), created, written and produced by STW founder Savin Yeatman-Eiffel and codirected by Yeatman-Eiffel and OSR art director Thomas Romain. The series was coproduced with Bandai Visual and Jetix Europe. It aired in more than 100 countries worldwide including ABC Family & Toon Disney (US), NHK BS1 & Disney Channel (Japan), France 3 (Fr.), ZDF and Super RTL (Germany), GMTV (UK), RAI2 (Italy) and Jetix/Disney XD. Nominated at the Bafta Awards, it also won an Anime Land Award and a Grand Entertainment Prize at Polymanga. Taku Iwasaki and Yoko Kanno composed respectively the BGM and the credit songs. With its strong visuals, story and themes, OSR has enjoyed a cult following since its release.

== OSR Blu-ray release ==
Thanks to the support of more than 4000 backers on Kickstarter in 2022, and of a long restoration process by STW on the original HD video masters and on 11 different original dubs that the company reacquired for the occasion, a 15th anniversary Blu-ray was released in 2023. The 1 hour making of the series, directed by Alex Pilot, was also remastered and remixed, and more than 1.5 hours of new extra featurettes, also directed by Alex Pilot, were added.

== New OSR developments ==
In 2017, Savin Yeatman-Eiffel and Thomas Romain announced they had started developing a potential sequel to Ōban Star-Racers The path explored are described in the featurette "Imagining the Future of Oban" included in the Blu-ray release. In 2023, Savin Yeatman-Eiffel confirmed more work was on the way.

== Exhibition "Eiffel, Toujours plus haut" ==
In 2023, for the centenary of Gustave Eiffel’s death, STW developed and produced the exhibition "Eiffel, Toujours plus haut" (Eiffel, higher and higher), curated by STW founder and Gustave Eiffel's great-great-great-grand-son Savin Yeatman-Eiffel. The designs were created by STW's artists under the art direction of Yukiko Yeatman-Eiffel. The exhibition started on 11 July on the esplanade of the Eiffel Tower in Paris, where it will stay until the end of 2023. STW hopes to take the exhibition to other locations as well.

== Other works ==
STW has been working regularly on two long term projects : the historical epic The 2 Queens, developed under the helm of animation master Toshiyuki Inoue (Akira, Blood: The Last Vampire, Paprika, Giovanni's Island); and a live-action adaptation of Gen Urobuchi's cult visual novel Saya no Uta.

STW also produces TV commercials and short films, exceptionally working on artistic development for third party companies (Zone of the Enders of Japanese studio Sunrise)

== Products ==
- Ōban Star-Racers (2006 TV series)
- Ōban Star-Racers (2023 Blu-ray release)
