= Felidae (film) =

1994 German animated film by Michael Schaack

- German theatrical release poster
- Directed by: Michael Schaack
- Screenplay by: Martin Kluger; Akif Pirinçci
- Based on: Felidae by Akif Pirinçci
- Produced by: Hanno Huth
- Starring: Ulrich Tukur; Mario Adorf; Helge Schneider; Uwe Ochsenknecht; Klaus Maria Brandauer
- Cinematography: Werner Loos
- Edited by: Klaus Basler
- Music by: Anne Dudley
- Production companies: TFC Trickcompany; Fontana
- Distributed by: Senator Film Distribution
- Release date: 3 November 1994
- Running time: 78 minutes
- Country: Germany
- Language: German
- Budget: DM 10 million ($US5 million)

Felidae is a 1994 German adult animated mystery thriller film directed by Michael Schaack and written by Martin Kluger, Stefaan Schieder and Akif Pirinçci. The film is an adaptation of Pirinçci's 1989 novel of the same name. The xenofictive plot, which features Gothic and neo-noir elements, centers on Francis, a domestic house cat who investigates a series of grisly feline murders in his new neighborhood. Produced by Trickompany, the film features the voices of Ulrich Tukur, Mario Adorf and Klaus Maria Brandauer.

Felidae was released in Germany by Senator Film Distribution on 3 November 1994.

== Plot ==
In the late 1980s, Francis, an intelligent and cynical cat, moves into a gloomy, dilapidated house with his owner, Gustav Löbel, a romance writer and archeologist. The top floor of the house gives off a mysterious and distinctly chemical odor. During Francis' exploratory tour of the house, he discovers the body of a cat who was killed by a bite to the neck. At the crime scene, he meets and befriends Bluebeard, a foul-mouthed, one-eyed, mutilated Maine Coon. After another corpse appears, Francis discovers that his house's top floor is the meeting site of a sect of cats led by Joker. The members of Joker's sect worship an entity named Claudandus and perform ritualistic suicide by throwing themselves into an electric current. When Francis' presence is discovered, he is chased by the sect members across the city's rooftops. He escapes through a skylight and meets a blind cat named Felicity, who supplies Francis with information on the Claudandus sect.

The next day, Bluebeard takes Francis to Pascal, an elderly and tech-savvy cat who has taken to meticulously maintaining a list of feline residents of the area, who informs Francis that Felicity is the latest victim. That night Francis is haunted by a nightmare of the famous friar and geneticist Gregor Mendel. During a rodent hunt, Francis discovers a video recording that documents the top floor's previous use as an experimental laboratory. This laboratory was devoted to the research/development of a fibrin glue and tissue adhesive that would close wounds in an instant. The test subjects largely consisted of stray cats that, more often than not, died in agony as a result of the failed test runs. The one cat who survived the experiments was christened by the lab's technicians as "Claudandus", Latin for "He who should or must be sealed". However, Claudandus eventually murdered the project's alcoholic and increasingly unhinged lead technician Dr. Preterius, leading to the escape of the other strays and closure of the lab. Claudandus would subsequently become a legendary martyr figure revered by the modern-day sect.

Francis discovers a crypt with hundreds of cat skeletons and realizes the murders have been occurring secretly for years. He comes to suspect Joker, the only cat who claims to have met Claudandus, until Joker is found dead as well. Francis confronts Pascal, who reveals himself to be Claudandus. After murdering Preterius, Claudandus was taken in by Preterius' former assistant Ziebold and learned of Mendel's laws of heredity. Over years he created a new breed of cat with ancient traits, aiming to recreate the primal ancestor of all domestic cats, capable of wiping out humanity. The murdered cats had refused to comply with his eugenics program. Claudandus, who is terminally ill with stomach cancer, declares Francis his chosen successor. Francis defiantly deletes Claudandus' computer records. The ensuing fight between the two starts a house fire. Ultimately Francis manages to disembowel Claudandus, who mourns his lost innocence as he dies. Leaving his legacy to burn, Francis rescues an injured Bluebeard from the flames.

Some time later, Francis once again encounters his mate, and in voiceover, encourages the viewer to keep believing in a world where humans and animals can live together in harmony.

== Cast ==
- Ulrich Tukur as Francis, a tuxedo cat who is new to the district and befriends Bluebeard and Pascal. In the novel, he was a European Shorthair.
- Mario Adorf as Bluebeard, a disfigured Maine Coon who spent his childhood in Professor Preterius' lab and befriends Francis at the beginning of his murder investigation.
- Klaus Maria Brandauer as Claudandus formerly known as Pascal, an elderly Havana Brown owned by Ziebold, a former associate of Preterius.
- Helge Schneider as Jesaja, a Persian cat and self-proclaimed "Guardian of the Dead", who lives in the catacombs underneath the district and receives the bodies of dead cats.
- Wolfgang Hess as Kong, a deformed Himalayan cat who antagonizes Francis until his pregnant mate Solitaire is killed.
- Gerhard Garbers as Prof. Julius Preterius, a previous resident of Francis' current home who attempted to create an infallible tissue adhesive by experimenting on local stray cats; every failure drove him spiraling into a insane and rambling alcoholic until he was killed by a test subject named Claudandus.
- Ulrich Wildgruber as Joker, a Scottish Fold who is the high priest of the Claudandus sect. He allows Claudandus to kill him in order to protect the secrecy of the sect. Later, his body was found by Francis.
- Mona Seefried as Felicity, a blind Russian Blue who lost her eyesight as a kitten in Preterius' lab and lives in Francis' district.
- Manfred Steffen as Gustav Löbel, Francis' owner.
- Uwe Ochsenknecht as Archie, Gustav's acquaintance and renovating partner.
- Michaela Amler as Nhozemphtekh, an Egyptian Mau belonging to an "old and new" breed who seduces Francis.
- Christian Schneller as Gregor Mendel, who appears as a figure in Francis' dreams.
- Tobias Lelle and Frank Röth as the Hermanns, a pair of Oriental Shorthairs who act as Kong's sidekicks.
- Alexandra Mink as Pepeline, Joker's great-granddaughter.

== Production and release ==
Felidae was the most expensive animated film produced in Germany to date, reportedly costing 10 million Deutsche Marks, or 5 million US dollars.

The soundtrack was released on a 16-track CD. The title song Felidae was sung by Boy George and co-written by him with John Themis.

It was released on PAL DVD region 2 with Dolby 5.1 and 2.0 surround sound for the original German audio and Dolby 2.0 for the English audio dub in Dolby 2.0. Extras (in German only) include DVD commentary, trailer in German, and a "making of" documentary.

The film was released in the United States as an Ultra HD Blu-ray by Deaf Crocodile on 31 December 2024, virtually three decades after its native release, while it was released in Canada on 11 February 2025. This is the film's first ever release for those markets, containing a new restoration of the film and Deaf Crocodile's first Ultra HD release, though the English dub is not present. It was also released on the streaming platform OVID.

== Reception and legacy ==
Although the film has had a cult following, the film failed at the German box office due to poor marketing, and the English version had not been widely released in any English-speaking country aside from a rare VHS in Australia, possibly due to the movie's strong violence and sexual content, prior to the rerelease by Deaf Crocodile. The dub was, however, included as an alternate-language option on the German and French DVD releases and has since been uploaded in its entirety onto YouTube.

Eric Hansen of Variety said that the film lacked screen time for the plot, and it needed more to avoid confusion. Hansen complimented the voices behind Francis and Bluebeard, but criticized Klaus Maria Brandauer's voice-over as a "by-the-numbers performance."

Austin Film Society has called it "catnip for any weirdo who's ever pondered the possibilities of an R-rated Don Bluth movie".

== Soundtrack ==
Felidae

Soundtrack album by Anne Dudley
- Released: 1994
- Recorded: 1994
- Genre: Orchestral
- Length: 41:35
- Label: Polymedia

=== Track listing ===
1. "Felidae" – 04:44 (Boy George/John Themis)
2. "Main Theme From Felidae" – 02:06
3. "Bluebeard - And Archie" – 01:26
4. "Kong And His Cronies" – 02:11
5. "Celebrating The Black Mass" – 05:55
6. "Felicity" – 01:50
7. "Pascal - The Enigma" – 01:37
8. "Mendel's Waltz" – 02:39
9. "Blood Sport" – 02:17
10. "A Gruesome Encounter" – 04:03
11. "Catacombs of Doom" – 01:01
12. "The Egyptian Dream" – 01:18
13. "Seduction NHOZEMPHTEKH" 01:29
14. "In The Snow" – 01:14
15. "The Riddle Falls into Place" – 05:04
16. "I Am Claudandus" – 05:01
