= Felidae (novel) =

1989 crime fiction novel by Akif Pirinçci

- The English edition of Felidae, published by Villard Books, a division of Random House
- Author: Akif Pirinçci
- Original title: Felidae
- Translator: Ralph Noble
- Language: German
- Series: Felidae #1
- Genre: Crime fiction
- Publisher: Wilhem Goldmann Verlag
- Publication date: 19 May 1989
- Publication place: West Germany
- English publication date: 24 May 1993
- Media type: Print (Hardcover)
- Pages: 262
- ISBN: 1-85702-125-8
- OCLC: 29182005
- Followed by: Felidae 2: On the Road

Felidae is a 1989 crime fiction novel by the German-Turkish writer Akif Pirinçci. The main character is a cat named Francis who investigates the murders of several cats in a big city in Germany. There are eight books in the Felidae series: Felidae, Felidae II (also known as Felidae on the Road or, in the original German version, Francis), Cave Canem, Das Duell, Salve Roma!, Schandtat, Felipolis and Göttergleich, of which only Felidae, Felidae II, and Felidae V: Salve Roma! have been translated into English.

== Plot ==
Francis the cat and his owner, Gustav, move into a poorly maintained apartment with bad smells and rotting parquet flooring. Francis soon finds the corpse of another local cat, Sascha. Bluebeard, a deformed local cat, is convinced that a human ("can openers" in cat slang) was responsible for this death and other recent murders of cats. Another tomcat, "Deep Purple", is the next victim. While visiting the body, Francis notices Deep Purple's sexually aroused state, suggesting a murderous femme fatale. Francis begins having disturbing nightmares which contain clues to the murders.

Before dawn, Francis finds a religious meeting taking place at the upper floor of his house, in which a cat named Joker preaches about a cat known as Claudandus who sacrificed himself and ascended to Heaven. Francis accidentally alerts Joker to his presence, and is chased by the cult members. He escapes and falls through a skylight into the home of Felicity, a blind cat who heard the murderer and his victims shortly before their death. Additionally, Felicity says that she sees images in her mind alongside feelings of fear and pain. Francis believes that these images are actually memories retained from childhood. The next morning, Felicity is murdered, which Francis learns from Pascal, an intelligent cat who has learned to operate his owner's computer.

Francis experiences another nightmare that night, in which a large portrait of Gregor Mendel comes to life and plays with dead cats. While hunting for rats, Francis discovers that his home originally belonged to a "Professor Julius Preterius", a scientist who experimented on neighborhood cats, in particular the lab's mascot, Claudandus. Preterius later went mad, saying Claudandus was speaking to him.

Francis later encounters the strange Jesaja, who lives within a tomb housing hundreds of cat skeletons. Jesaja says that he serves "The Prophet", who delivers corpses for him to guard.

Francis answers the call of a female in heat. When he inquires about her breed, she states that her breed has no name, but is both old and new. That night, Francis experiences another dream, this time involving a white cat who calls himself Felidae.

Joker goes missing and Francis finds him dead amongside some porcelain statues. Unlike the previous murders, there appears to have been no struggle. Francis begins to connect his dreams to the murders: he realizes that Pascal's owner was formerly one of Preterius' lab assistants and idolizes Mendel.

Francis concludes that the murderer is Pascal, who really is Claudandus, and goes to confront him. He finds a program on the computer that catalogues the new breed's genetics and breeding. It's revealed that Pascal has been killing every cat which mates with her in order to keep their bloodline pure. Francis and Claudandus begin to battle, with Claudandus accidentally destroying the computer and setting the house afire in the process. Claudandus dies after Francis slits his throat.

In the epilogue, Francis states that he never told any others the true identity of the murderer, and that Joker's name was eventually cleared. Jesaja was coaxed out of the catacombs, and has found a new home with a bartender.

== Reception ==
In Germany, Felidae became a best-seller. The initial print run of the novel in Germany was 7,000 copies, but the publisher began producing more after the book's success. Worldwide, Felidae has sold millions of copies.

Felidae has become a censored and banned work in recent years, owing largely to Akif Pirinçci's controversial political presence, which includes profanity and crude humour, right-wing statements and inflammatory remarks about issues such as The Holocaust and the immigration of Islamic refugees. Publisher Random House, the prime distributor for Felidae, cancelled contracts with Pirinçci, ceasing further print production of the book, while commerce giant Amazon removed all print and digital sales pages for the book, except for used copies, which run roughly over US$100 in price. The Felidae book itself contains no commentary on Islam or on foreign refugees.

== Film adaptation ==
A German animated film, also called Felidae, produced in 1994 and directed by Michael Schaack was based on the first Felidae novel of the same name. The movie script was co-written by Pirinçci. It was the most expensive animated film produced in Germany, reportedly costing 10 million marks.
