= Thomas Romain =

French animator (born 1977 or 1978)

- Born: 1977 or 1978 (age 48–49); Besançon, France
- Education: Gobelins, l'École de l'image
- Occupation: Animator
- Notable work: Code Lyoko; Ōban Star-Racers
- Children: 2

Thomas Romain (French pronunciation: [tɔmɑ ʁɔmɛ̃]; born 1977 or 1978) is a French animator who is responsible for creating Code Lyoko alongside Tania Palumbo. He is also responsible for designing and co-directing the French-Japanese animated series Ōban Star-Racers, which would be the start of his career in Japan. He's also the founder and creative director of Studio No Border.

In early 2017 Romain attracted mainstream media attention when he began tweeting illustrations he had drawn based on his children's sketches.

== Works ==
=== French animation ===
- Code Lyoko (creator)
- Code Lyoko: Evolution (creator)
- Ōban Star-Racers (character design, director)

=== Anime ===
- Aria the Natural (Design Works)
- Aria the OVA ~Arietta~ (Layout Animation Director)
- Bludgeoning Angel Dokuro-chan Second (Face used in credits)
- Engage Planet Kiss Dum (Art Design)
- Basquash! (Original Concept, Art Director, Mechanical Concept Design, Key Animation)
- Senki Zesshō Symphogear (Art Director)
- Space Dandy (Spaceship Design)
- Macross Delta (World Design)
- Cannon Busters (Supervising Director)
- Carole & Tuesday (World Design)
- SK8 the Infinity (Skateboard Design)
- Zombie Land Saga: Yumeginga Paradise (Spaceship design, aliens, and the Saga Expo venue)

=== Video games ===
- The Great Ace Attorney: Adventures (Background Art)
- The Great Ace Attorney 2: Resolve (Background Art)
