= Pumpkin 3D =

French animation studio

Pumpkin 3D is an animation studio based in France that specializes in Computer animation. Past work has included animation for the anime television series Oban Star-Racers and animated feature films, including Azur et Asmar and Persepolis.
