= Japanese swords in fiction =

The katana sword appears in many folk tales as well as legends. This piece of Japanese history not only appears in old folklore, it is also very popular in modern fiction as well as contemporary art pieces such as film and theater. The katana has reached far and wide in the world of fictional stories and can be used to tell tales of wisdom and bravery or evil and treachery. The sword can be seen not only as a tool for the hero but also a tool for the villain.

== Traditional lore ==
Many legends surround Japanese swords, the most frequent being that the blades are folded an immense number of times, gaining magical properties in the meantime. While blades folded hundreds, thousands, or even millions of times are encountered in fiction, there is no record of real blades being folded more than around 20 times. With each fold made by the maker, every internal layer is also folded, and so the total number of layers in a sword blade is doubled at each fold; since the thickness of a katana blade is less than 2^{30} iron atoms, going beyond 20 folds no longer adds meaningfully to the number of layers in the blade. Folding a blade only ten times will therefore create 1024 layers; 20 times will create 1,048,576 layers.

Furthermore, while heating and folding serves to even out the distribution of carbon throughout the blade, a small amount of carbon is also 'burnt out' of the steel in this process; repeated folding will eventually remove most of the carbon, turning the material into softer iron and reducing its ability to hold a sharp edge. This can be combated with carburization, though it does not produce even carbon distribution, partially defeating the purpose of folding.

Some swords were reputed to reflect their creators' personalities. Those made by Muramasa had a reputation for violence and bloodshed, while those made by Masamune were considered weapons of peace. A popular legend tells of what happens when two swords made by Muramasa and Masamune were held in a stream carrying fallen lotus petals: while those leaves touching the Muramasa blade were cut in two, those coming towards the Masamune suddenly changed course and went around the blade without touching it.

Kusanagi (probably a tsurugi, a type of Bronze Age sword which precedes the katana by centuries) is the most famous legendary sword in Japanese mythology, involved in several folk stories. Along with the Jewel and the Mirror, it was one of the three godly treasures of Japan. A common misconception is that Katana magically sprung into existence in Japan, utterly isolated from the mainland. The technique of folding steel came from the manufacture of the Dao in China, and contact with the mainland would affect how the katana evolved through the centuries. The katana design itself was developed over hundreds of years and the katana design was a development of the Tachi.

== Modern fiction ==
The most common depiction, especially in the Western world, of the Katana is a weapon of unparalleled power, often bordering on the physically impossible. Katana are often depicted as being inherently "superior" to all other weapons possessing such qualities as being impossibly light, nigh-unbreakable and able to cut through nearly anything. By contrast, traditional European weapons are often depicted as clumsy, crude and unwieldy by comparison.

It is the prime weapon of choice for Japanese heroes in historical fiction set before the Meiji period. Carrying a non-sealed katana is illegal in present-day Japan, but in fiction this law is often ignored or circumvented to allow characters to carry katana as a matter of artistic license. For instance, some stories state that carrying weapons has been permitted due to a serious increase in crimes or an invasion of monsters from other dimensions. With this law in mind, katana are sometimes used for comic relief in anime and manga set in the present, although this is sometimes replaced by the use of a bokken having surprisingly comparable capabilities. In the film Kill Bill: Volume 1, the main protagonist is permitted to bring her katana on board an airliner; presumably, this is a policy of the fictitious Japanese airline, as other passengers can also be seen carrying swords.

Due to the renowned quality of the sword and the mysticism surrounding the relationship between the blade and its wielder, the katana appears in various works of fiction, including film, anime, manga, other forms of literature, and computer games. It is frequently used by non-Japanese creators, partly due to its status as an easily recognizable icon of Japan and its high reputation as a formidable weapon in skilled hands. Four well-known appearances in Western culture are Bruce Willis' weapon of opportunity in Quentin Tarantino's Pulp Fiction, the Bride's signature weapon in Kill Bill (a film strongly influenced by Japanese samurai movies), the katana used by the main characters in Highlander and the 1975 Tom Laughlin action Western film The Master Gunfighter. Other appearances for the western audience include a pair of Ninjato carried by the character Leonardo in the Teenage Mutant Ninja Turtles franchise. Ulrich Stern wields one in the first, second and third seasons of Code Lyoko, but gains an additional katana in the fourth season and in Code Lyoko: Evolution. Michonne wields a katana as her main weapon in The Walking Dead franchise. The ronin lightsaber is used by Ochi of Bestoon in the Star Wars universe, featured prominently in the film "Star Wars: The Rise of Skywalker" (2019). The lightsaber's design embodies this concept, featuring a hilt that resembles a traditional katana sword handle, complete with a crossguard.

=== Manga and anime ===
Manga and anime show a prominent feature of katana for specific characters. In the manga Bakuman, the characters while researching on the commonality between the popular manga styles, mentioned Japanese swords are always present in them, including InuYasha, One Piece, Bleach, Gin Tama and various other examples.

- In Arifureta: From Commonplace to World's Strongest, the main protagonist Hajime Nagumo improvised his gunsmithing skills to create Tsumehirameki, a unique Kissaki Moroha Zukuri style double edged Katana which he gifted to one of his future lovers Shizuku. Coincidentally, Hajime's gunsmith creation of Tsumehirameki parallels the real-life Tsuneyoshi Murata, a Meiji era military general and firearms designer who created the first Gunto known as Murata-Tou which is of the same double edged Katana design as Tsumehirameki.
- In Bleach, all Soul Reapers wields Zanpakuto which take on the form of Japanese swords in their base form. The main protagonist, Ichigo Kurosaki, Zanpakuto, the first Zangetsu's final evolved form is a black blade Katana with immense spiritual powers, able to clash with the strongest opponents such as Soul Reapers Captains and Arrancars.
- In Highschool of the Dead, one of the main characters, Saeko Busujima who is a famous Kendo prodigy believed to be on par with Chiba Sanako, a female swordmaster of Hokushin Ittō-ryū. Saeko received a historical Meiji era Gunto which is a Kissaki Moroha Zukuri style Katana personally created by General Murata as her new weapon for fighting zombies.
- In One Piece, a large majority of legendary swords are Japanese Katana, with one of the main characters, Roronoa Zoro having collected a total of five legendary Katana during his journey with the Straw Hat Pirates, Wado Ichimonji, Sandai Kitetsu, Yubashiri, Shusui and Enma, losing Yubashiri to irreparable damage in combat, later replacing Shusui with Enma one of the two Kozuki Family heirloom swords.
- In Shaman King, the main character Yoh Asakura wields Harusame, a Katana originally belonged to his Guardian Ghost, the legendary Samurai Amidamaru, The masterpiece of his best friend Mosuke who created it from his father's knife during their childhood.

There are also several manga series that were inspired by the Japanese swords. Kamata Kimiko's Katana is one such series; it is heavily imbued with the theme of katana with the story plot following an extraordinary teenage boy with the ability to see the 'spirit forms' of swords.

==== Sakabatō ====
The sakabatō (逆刃刀) is a type of katana from Rurouni Kenshin, wielded by Himura Kenshin. It is a "reverse-edge sword", translated in the English-language dub as a "reverse blade sword". Some companies have created true replicas of the sakabatō.

The sharpened edge is the inward curved, shorter side of the blade – the opposite of a standard katana – making it extremely difficult to kill an opponent; it generally knocks the wielder's enemies "senseless" rather than killing them. The only way for the sakabatō to cut is to rotate the hilt by 180 degrees within the hand, thus holding the sword backwards. The sakabatō symbolizes Kenshin's oath not to kill again.

=== Video games ===
Video games also provide frequent appearances of the katana, most with unique characteristics. Kaede, the protagonist of the arcade series The Last Blade, Yoshimitsu, the well known ninja from Tekken, and Mitsurugi, the Japanese samurai from the Soul series also wield Katana as their default weapons. Katana frequently appear in role-playing video games, such as some Elder Scrolls games like Morrowind, Oblivion, Skyrim or Neverwinter Nights, as weapons; often faster than a longsword yet less powerful. The browser video game Touken Ranbu developed by Nitroplus and DMM Games involves the player assuming the role of a sage who has the power to bring historical katana to life. One of the more recent appearances of the katana in another video game series is in Left 4 Dead 2, a game made by Valve. Team Fortress 2, another Valve game, also features an unlockable katana called the Half-Zatoichi. The name comes from the fictional Japanese swordsman Zatoichi. In Final Fantasy VII, the character Sephiroth wields a very long katana. Other games in the Final Fantasy series include a sword called the Masamune, apparently named after the famous Japanese swordsmith. In Ninja Gaiden, protagonist Ryu Hayabusa wields two legendary Japanese swords, the Dragon Sword, a katana which was carved from a Dragon's fang, and the Blade of the Archfiend, a Tachi which was forged from a cursed meteorite. In the Devil May Cry series, Sparda, the father of protagonist Dante, who is a legendary demon weaponsmith, designed one of his masterpieces Yamato after a traditional Japanese katana, which is then wielded by Dante's twin brother Vergil, who is a master of Iaijutsu.

In the three video games based on Code Lyoko (Get Ready to Virtualize!, Quest for Infinity, and Fall of X.A.N.A.) Ulrich Stern utilizes his saber to slice and dice monsters.

== Television ==
Teenage Mutant Ninja Turtles (1987) deals with it twice. In "Ninja Sword of Nowhere", an alien spacecraft left a fragment of an alien metal, used to travel between dimensions in a mere microsecond, on Earth thousands of years ago, before a craftsman found the alien metal, forging a Japanese sword. This creates a legend of a sword which allows its owner to show up and disappear whenever he or she wishes. "Sword of Yurikawa" has a plot with an old Japanese sword.

The French series Code Lyoko and its sequel series Code Lyoko: Evolution depict one of its five main characters, Ulrich Stern, with a katana (called "saber") as his only weapon on the virtual world of Lyoko and eventually the Cortex region. At one point, his katana was temporarily modified and upgraded by the false Franz Hopper, capable of charging and emitting a wave of white energy that could wipe out three monsters from a distance. In its fourth season, he is presented with an additional katana, which is easier for him to get a "close slave."
