= Signature weapon =

Weapon commonly associated with a certain group or individual

A signature weapon (or trademark weapon or weapon of choice) is one commonly identified with a certain group or, in the case of literature, epic poems, comics, and film, where it is a popular trope, for both protagonist and antagonists to be associated with and highly proficient in the use of specific weaponry. An example is Robin Hood's longbow.

Signature weapons enable viewers and readers to easily distinguish between characters who are often nearly identical in appearance (e.g., the Teenage Mutant Ninja Turtles). Signature weapons are a common feature of role-playing games and video games. The acquisition of the signature weapons usually marks a newly heightened level of martial prowess and/or aids in the creation of a unique avatar.

== Additional historical context ==
=== Sword's perception and status ===
Throughout history and fiction signature swords are often regarded as a rare and powerful tool of divinity, demanding the respect from the wielder as often time it is presented with some level of sentience.

During the early Middle Ages, blacksmiths had a unique social position, as they were responsible for crafting swords using better and costly materials that were often only accessible to the nobility. With how prevalent religion and superstition played an important role in shaping culture and belief, significantly more during wartime, the mystery of the metal works and sword smithing in general for the time period, and eventually its lack of combat application on the battlefield, solidified swords as personal status symbols more than practical weapons for the battlefield.

In Eastern cultures such as Japan and China, swords were treated with similar aspects with one key difference which involves Confucianist philosophy where the focus shifts from the weapon to the self-improvement of the user, with a strong emphasis on morals, ethics, and discipline, as a sword is believed to be another part of the user, it can be corrupted or lost its edge when the user is not disciplined, this concept provided extra dimension to the culture surrounding weapons where the power of a sword was not given but earned through feats and rigorous training of the user. An example of signature fictional weapon that extensively feature this concept is Himura Kenshin's Sakabato.

In present days, swords are mainly reserved for ceremonial use as sidearms and pistol became more practical to use during combat and personal defense.

=== Pistol perception and status ===
By the late 17th century to early 18th century when muskets were standardized in the military, armored knights were replaced with lightweight military officers, with unique uniforms and garments however they still retained the use of swords and sabres as symbolic value of a leader, on rare occasions, they may carry with them a flintlock pistol, depending on the officer's assigned regiment or background. The tradition of carrying swords into battle was eventually abandoned after World War I.

The late Victorian Era to the end of World War I, saw the industrialization and modernization of repeating firearms with revolvers being more common and cheaper, they were found in the hands of many military officers and auxiliary branches of armies, across the many conflicts and events during the time from the Crimean War to the end of the American Frontier, with World War I demonstrating the deadly effectiveness of modernized weapons as a whole.

During this period, the Mauser C96 once received its fame for being the first commercially successful semi-automatic pistol that were adopted by militaries, notably by the Imperial Germany Army for the "Red Nine" 9mm variants and the locally produced clones by the Republic of China.

Self-loading pistols gradually became more common for civilian and military use during and after World War II, the Luger Pistol gained its iconic status during the time due to its lack of appearance on the battlefield, the pistols were being sought after as spoils of war for the Allied forces.

In the civilian context of modern times, firearms are viewed as privileges by most nations due to the regulation of the use and possession of firearms often involve lengthy and restrictive legislative processes as these were implemented to prevent and deter misuse of firearm and to combat the proliferation and the over-availability of firearms to the public.
