= Subdigitals =

Code Lyoko Featuring Subdigitals

Studio album by The Subdigitals
- Released: (France) November 20, 2006 (United States) June 19, 2007
- Genre: Techno, alternative rock, pop rock
- Length: 42:52
- Label: Caroline Records

Code Lyoko Featuring Subdigitals is an album released by MoonScoop featuring songs by the fictional musicians The Subdigitals (formerly The Subsonics) in the French animated television series Code Lyoko. Un monde sans danger / A World Without Danger was released as a physical CD single only in France, but was later imported to the several United States online retailers, including Amazon and eBay. Planet Net was released as a music video single in order to promote the release of the soundtrack in the United States version.

== Track listing ==
No.	Title	Length
1.	"Planet Net"	2:53
2.	"Ouvre les yeux / Angel of Mine"	4:00
3.	"Technoïde / School is Out"	2:46
4.	"D'ici et ailleurs / Virtual World"	4:34
5.	"Ensemble / Time to Cry"	3:49
6.	"Sauver le monde / Secret Life"	3:56
7.	"Rodéo / Surfing in Cyberspace"	3:34
8.	"La tribu / Mother Earth"	3:16
9.	"S'en aller / Get Away"	3:40
10.	"Bienvenue / World With My Eyes"	3:52
11.	"S'envoler / Break Away"	3:11
12.	"Un monde sans danger / A World Without Danger"	3:24
