= Final mix =

Final mix may refer to:

- "Final Mix", an episode of Code Lyoko.
- Kingdom Hearts Final Mix, an alternate version of the Kingdom Hearts game.
- Kingdom Hearts II Final Mix+, an alternate version of the Kingdom Hearts II game.
- The product of Audio mixing (recorded music)
