= Carole Baillien =

Belgian actress

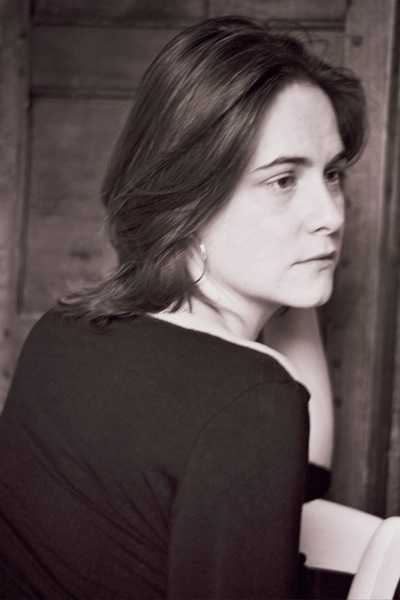
- Born: 10 January 1968 (age 58); Brussels, Belgium
- Occupations: Actress; author

Carole Baillien (born 10 January 1968) is a Belgian actress and author.

== Career ==
Carole plays characters in theatrical, television, and Belgian and French movies. She also contributes to French language voice work for foreign movies, shows, and videogames as well. She is best known as the French language of Naruto Uzumaki in the French version of Naruto.

== Roles and directions in French ==
=== Films ===
- Le Piège du Père Noël TV from Christian Faure
- La Face Cachée, drama from Bernard Campan
- La Fabrique des sentiments, drama from Jean-Marc Moutout
- Enfant de ..., shortcut from Carole Baillien

=== Theater ===
- Coc'opéra ou les choix de Chanel from O. Mothes and E. Eramberg.
- Les chasseurs de rêves fromM. Paviç
- Mignonne allons voir si la rose… from Cavanna
- Série noire pour un bœuf from R. Bonaccorsi
- Le livre de Daubmanus from M. Paviç
- ILLI (les phobies) from Carole baillien.
- Confessions d'un autre genre from Carole baillien.
- Les Manipulateurs from Carole Baillien

== Dubbing works in French ==
=== Cinema (French version) ===
- Beyond Justice: Jodie
- Haine et Passions: Mel
- Kill Me Later: Shawn
- Le Mariage de Tuya: Tuya
- Les Supers génies: Sammy
- Millions: Damian

==== Series TV (French version) ====
- Alerte Cobra: Andrea Schäfer
- Balko: Colette
- Doctor Who: Donna Noble
- Falcon Down: Sharon Williams
- The Hard Times of RJ Berger : Lily Miran
- Homicidios: Eva Hernandez
- Lip Service: Sam Murray
- Ma baby-sitter est un vampire: Sarah
- McLeod's Daughters: Tess
- Shameless: Karen et Liam
- Leipzig Homicide: Ina
- This Life: Milly
- William et Mary: Mary Gilcrest

==== Cartoons (French version) ====
- Naruto Uzumaki in Naruto
- Bloom in Winx Club
- Noah in Jacob Two-Two
- Trixie Tang in The Fairly OddParents
- Mabel Pines in Gravity Falls
- Adam Lyon in My Gym Partner's a Monkey
- Martha in Martha Speaks
- Astro Boy: Abercrombie
- Babe My Love: Marika, Miyako Sakashita
- Beyblade: Max
- Beyblade: Metal Fusion: Yu
- Black Cat: Train Heartnet (enfant)
- Burst Angel: Jo
- Code Lyoko: Sissi, Nicolas Poliakoff
- Creepschool: Elsa
- Doraemon: Nobita Nobi, Sewashi Nobi
- Franklin: Basile
- Gravity Falls: Mabel Pines
- Jacob Jacob: Noah
- Jungle Junction: Rosie
- Kirby: Right Back at Ya!: Tif
- L'Ange Tirelire: Rita
- Marvin/Martin: Edna/Zelda
- Miss Spider: Spido
- Nonoko: Nonoko
- Les Podcats: Mimo
- Popetown: Sœur Marie
- Pound Puppies: Strudel
- Shin-chan: Nanako
- Super Samson: Samson
- Tracey McBean: Megan
- Viva Pinata: Plume Elephanille, Cécile Serpistache, Ginette Meuhfine
- Wombat City: Sharon
- Yu-Gi-Oh!: Maï Kujaku, Serenity Wheeler, Rebecca
- Zorori le magnifique: Ishishi

=== Video games (French version) ===
- Naruto Uzumaki in Naruto: Rise of a Ninja
- Winx Club: Bloom
- Sissi Delmas, Nicolas Poliakoff in code lyoko: quest for infinity
