= Carrere Group D.A. =

French entertainment and media company

Founded in December 1995, CARRERE is an entertainment and media company specializing in TV movies, series, feature films and animation globally. The company has also produced documentaries in the past.

It created and produced such properties as Flash Gordon, The Nest, Princess Scheherazade, The 3 Wise Men, Argaï, Moby Dick, Malo Korrigan, My Dad the Rock Star, Milo, etc. and built a library of totally nearly 600 hours.

It also distributed such properties as The Adventures of Hello Kitty & Friends, The Incredible Hulk, The Bionic Woman, Sea Quest, Will and Grace, Dungeons and Dragons, Detective and Judge, Research Unit, Charley and Mimmo etc. in selected territories or worldwide.

The company Carrere participates in many events and shows such as MIPTV Media Market in Cannes, MIPCOM, DISCOP, NATPE, "Le rendez-vous de Biarritz" and Kidscreen summit.

The head office is at 25 Rue Saint Didier in Paris (75016). The company is represented by Axel Carrere.

== Animation ==
- The 3 Wise Men
- Four Eyes!
- Alien Zoo
- Alix
- Argai: The Prophecy
- Arzak Rhapsody
- Bricks'n Brats
- Buddy Buddy
- Cajoo
- Carrot Top
- Christmas Tales
- Cotoons
- A Cow, a Cat & the Ocean
- Daddy's Gone Bats
- Dad'x
- Elias: The Little Rescue Boat
- Flash Gordon
- Gods of Mount Olympus
- The Adventures of Hello Kitty & Friends
- Hoze Houndz
- Jungle Show
- Kartapus
- Katie and Orbie
- Krazy Kitchen Stories
- The Legend of Parva
- Malo Korrigan
- Milo
- Moby Dick
- My Dad the Rock Star
- Panshel
- Phantom Spirits
- Princess Scheherazade
- Prudence Petitpas Investigations
- The Renés
- Rollbots
- Shtoing Circus
- Sam Spoiler
- Tobomoc
- Wombat City
- Yona Yona Penguin
