= List of Code Lyoko episodes =

This is a list of episodes for the French animated television series Code Lyoko. The first season has no set viewing order except for the last two episodes, so the episodes are listed by the order in which they aired. The episodes in the following seasons are numbered in order. The series has a total of 97 episodes: 26 each for the first two seasons, 15 for the third and 30 for the fourth.

The first three seasons, the prequel, and episodes 68–79 and 79–88 aired on Cartoon Network. Episode 78 and episodes 89–97 aired on Cartoon Network Video and Kabillion and not on the Cartoon Network television channel.

The MoonScoop Group announced a sequel series titled Code Lyoko: Evolution that ran for one season and consisted of 26 episodes. The series revolves around a gang of boarding-school students who travel to the virtual world of Lyoko, within a quantum supercomputer, to battle XANA, a malevolent AI/multi-agent system who desires to rule all of humanity.

== Series overview ==
Season	Episodes	Originally released	
Season	Episodes	First released	Last released
1	26	September 3, 2003	February 25, 2004
2	26	August 31, 2005	December 9, 2005
3	15	September 9, 2006	October 23, 2006
4	30	May 18, 2007	November 10, 2007

== Episodes ==
=== Season 1 (2003–04) ===
- In this season only, the spelling of Jeremy's name is officially "Jeremie." It's changed to "Jeremy" in later seasons.
- Odd Della Robbia's only ability on Lyoko is "future flash", allowing to see imminent danger to his friends or hidden paths. It is used only in four episodes and is lost after this season.
- The Desert region has the most appearances.
- Despite not being able to defend herself, Aelita's special ability is her "power of creation", the power to manipulate and alter the terrain of all four ecological regions of the virtual world.
- Yumi Ishiyama's only power of telekinesis is used in three episodes, as it tires her out in about a minute.
- Ulrich Stern's Lyoko abilities are "super sprint", "triangulate" and "triplicate".
- After many months of hard effort, Aelita is successfully materialized into the real world.
- The ever-suspicious Jim Morales temporarily joins Team Lyoko, but has his memory wiped by a return to the past.

No. overall	No. in season	Title	Original release date	American air date	Prod. code
1	1	"Teddygozilla"	September 3, 2003	April 19, 2004	103
Milly and Tamiya are doing a report on the school prom. They try to interview Sissi, who was prom queen last year, but she turns them down and makes fun of them for their age. Milly tries to ask Ulrich out, and he turns her down because he's going to the dance with Yumi. Upset, Milly storms off. In her room, she tells Tamiya that she hates everyone, with XANA listening from her computer. When Milly tells her teddy bear that she wishes she were bigger and leaves it in the garden shed, XANA possesses it and uses it to attack those who make fun of her. It then increases the teddy bear's size to roughly two stories and sets it on the town. Since Ulrich is to protect the school and warn Yumi, it is up to Odd to go to Lyoko and help Aelita deactivate the tower and protect the rest of the town from the rampaging teddy bear. After a return to the past, Milly asks Ulrich to the dance again, and Ulrich complies, embarrassing Sissi.: This takes place roughly a year after "XANA Awakens, Part 2"
2	2	"Le voir pour le croire" "Seeing Is Believing"	September 10, 2003	April 20, 2004	101
Principal Delmas lets Odd begin casting for a traditional rock band called the Pop Rock Progressives. They need a drummer, and several try out for the position, including Nicolas. Nicolas turns out to be the best, but Odd does not want anything to do with him. Meanwhile, XANA tries to overload a nuclear power plant by storing electricity in a transformer and unleashing it on the plant all at once, possibly causing a nuclear meltdown. Unsure if they can stop such an event, the group votes, and, by a 3 to 2 vote, they decide to tell the authorities. Yumi goes to inform them while the others stay behind to deal with XANA. Now they must deactivate the tower before the city is turned into a nuclear wasteland. Not only that, they also have to do so before the authorities find out about the Supercomputer. In the end, the tower is deactivated and, after a return trip, Nicolas and Jim are added to the Pop Rock Progressives.
3	3	"Vacances dans la brume (Translation: Vacation in the Mist)" "Holiday in the Fog"	September 17, 2003	April 21, 2004	102
After Jeremy and Ulrich paint graffiti portraying Jim in a less than favorable light on a wall in order for Jeremy to remain at school during a vacation, Sissi overhears him talking with the others about his reasons for doing so: to watch XANA. She gets her father to let her stay there during the vacation so she can discover the group's secret. XANA takes the opportunity to possess several barrels full of poison and turns the poison into a deadly, living gas. When Jeremy finds out, he calls his friends away from their respective vacations. XANA uses the gas to attack Jeremy, Jim, and Sissi, and Jeremy just barely makes it out. Ulrich stays behind to find Jim and Sissi while the others go to deactivate the tower. In the end, Jeremy once again sprays graffiti, only this time, Ulrich helps and it shows Jim as a king, much to Jim's liking.
4	4	"Carnet de bord" "Log Book"	September 24, 2003	April 22, 2004	105
When Sissi finds and steals Ulrich's diary, he is blackmailed into being her boyfriend. During a trip to a swimming pool, Jeremy and Yumi have the opportunity to find it. The new electric bus that is being used for the field trip is possessed by XANA. and starts acting weird as a result. Yumi ends up finding Sissi's diary during this and uses it to blackmail her into giving up the location of Ulrich's diary. XANA then turns the bus on the city's petrochemical plant, threatening to blow up a sizable portion of the city. Yumi is sent to Lyoko to help Aelita, but she is devirtualized in the process. Odd manages to escape from the bus, leaving him to take Aelita safely to the tower to deactivate it in order to end the attack.
5	5	"Big Bogue" "Big Bug"	October 1, 2003	April 23, 2004	108
XANA launches an attack on the internet itself, managing to disable much of the city's infrastructure. Though most of the problems caused can be bypassed by manual controls, two trains that are completely automatic are put on a collision course, one of which contains a load of highly toxic and deadly chemicals. Yumi and Ulrich go to help Aelita, but Odd is forced to stay because Sissi tells on him to Jim for having Kiwi, since he pulled a prank on her. On Lyoko, Ulrich and Yumi are devirtualized and Aelita deals with a Megatank alone with her Creativity. Odd finally escapes and goes to Aelita's rescue, and they stop the attack just before the trains collide.
6	6	"Cruel Dilemme" "Cruel Dilemma"	October 8, 2003	April 26, 2004	106
Due to a favorable accident on Odd's part, Jeremy's materialization program for Aelita is finished, but is only good for one use. In turn, XANA possesses two bulldozers and sets them on the factory to prevent Aelita's materialization from taking place. Odd goes to Lyoko while Ulrich tries to stop the bulldozers. Ulrich is then knocked unconscious, and Yumi carries him to safety. Odd is devirtualized, and Yumi goes to Lyoko to help Aelita. When trying to stop an attack, Yumi pushes a Megatank to save Aelita, but she falls into the Digital Sea by mistake. To save her, Aelita gives up her materialization program, which allows Jeremy to bring back Yumi.
7	7	"Problème d'image" "Image Problem"	October 15, 2003	April 27, 2004	110
After an unexplained incident on Lyoko ends up devirtualizing Yumi without any cause, she is taken to the infirmary. After waking up, she attacks the nurse, Yolanda (addressed as "Dorothy" in the English dub), and continues to act strangely throughout the day, wanting to go to Lyoko with everyone else. Jeremy will not let them, though, because he wants to know what caused her devirtualization. Meanwhile, on Lyoko, Aelita finds several Kankrelats guarding an orange sphere, which she calls a Guardian, and informs Jeremy. Back at the school, Principal Delmas confronts Yumi about her attack on Yolanda. When he threatens to call her parents, she attacks him as well. In another attempt to get the group to Lyoko, Yumi tries to seduce Jeremy to convince him to arrange a mission. She fails, but Odd and Ulrich stumble upon the scene. Jeremy tries to explain, leaving Yumi alone. Jeremy apologizes for the incident, citing Yumi's strange behavior. When they head back to his room, they find his computer destroyed. Yumi seems the likely culprit. She shows up to meet them, still wanting to go to Lyoko. Having no choice, they go, but Yumi stops the scanner before it can close, leaving her alone in the scanner room. As she goes to work destroying the scanners, the others find the real Yumi trapped inside the Guardian. After being devirtualized by Ulrich, she and her clone engage in battle. Eventually, the clone tries to kill Jeremy, but Aelita manages to deactivate the tower before Jeremy falls to his death.
8	8	"Clap de fin" "End of Take"	October 22, 2003	April 28, 2004	109
After Principal Delmas shows a movie about aliens made by a director named James Finson, Finson announces that he plans to make a movie in the city, using the factory as their primary location. The group would rather not have people setting up shop in their factory, so Ulrich tries to convince Finson that making a movie there would be a bad idea. All his efforts achieve the latter result, and he's even given a part in the movie, but Delmas will not let him miss school. Sissi, who wants to be in the movie, convinces her father to let Ulrich miss school so she'll get a part. While Ulrich is guarding the lower levels, XANA possesses the alien monster prop and uses it to capture Ulrich and Sissi and use them as bait for the others. He manages to do this, but captures only Yumi. Odd must take Aelita to the tower quickly before Yumi and Ulrich suffocate to death, but XANA makes things even more difficult by not only guarding with Hornets, but also cloning the tower.
9	9	"Satellite"	October 29, 2003	April 29, 2004	112
During class, everyone's cell phones suddenly go off, and all of them are confiscated. Sissi is not happy about this and organizes a protest in response. Yumi joins the protest, since having cell phones is a necessary part of the group's fight against XANA. Meanwhile, Jeremy investigates the strange occurrence and learns that XANA is using the school's antenna to take over the nearby television antenna. From there, he could take over a laser-equipped, military satellite. While Odd and Ulrich head to Lyoko to prevent XANA from doing so, Yumi stays behind to support Sissi's protest. As they head for the tower, XANA succeeds in taking over a military satellite and turns it on the school. Odd, who gets devirtualized, has to keep Yumi safe while Aelita and Ulrich look for a tower that seems to be invisible.
10	10	"Créature de rêve" "The Girl of the Dreams"	November 5, 2003	April 30, 2004	107
After Jeremy makes another failed attempt to materialize Aelita, a student named Taelia arrives at school that looks exactly like her. Jeremy is convinced that it must be her, but she seems to have no memory of her experiences with the group. The others are not quite as convinced, but Jeremy insists that the materialization process must have caused her to lose her memory, but the others were right. Aelita is still on Lyoko and captured by a Guardian. Meanwhile, XANA possesses the samurai armor that Yumi brought to school and uses it to chase Yumi. Jeremy brings Taelia with him to the factory. Odd and Ulrich must free Aelita and deactivate the tower before Yumi is defeated by the possessed samurai armor and Jeremy is taken away by the police. Note: The name Taelia is an anagram of the name Aelita.
11	11	"Enragés (Translation: Rabid)" "Plagued"	November 12, 2003	May 3, 2004	111
XANA possesses a rat that tries to sneak a bite from the school's kitchen. His creation goes on biting other rats, putting them under his control. Meanwhile, the school counselor has been watching Jeremy and believes him to be a gifted student. As such, he believes that Jeremy would be better off at a more advanced school and decides to give him an aptitude test. During the test, XANA's rat army attacks the school.
12	12	"Attaque en piqué" "Swarming Attack"	November 19, 2003	May 4, 2004	104
After failing with an army of rats, XANA attempts a similar tactic using hornets. Meanwhile, Ulrich gets a letter from Yumi saying that she loves him. He's not quite sure how to respond, so he avoids talking to her about it. Jeremy and Odd find out about the note, but does not learn who wrote it. Ulrich tells them not to tell Yumi. After learning about the hornets and XANA's control over them, the group heads for the factory. Ulrich talks to Yumi about the note and tells her that he feels the same way, only to find out that it is Sissi who wrote it. On Lyoko, Ulrich's reaction to the discovery leaves his performance lacking as the hornets move on the school.
13	13	"D'un cheveu (Translation: By a Hair)" "Just in Time (Note: When this episode was originally uploaded onto the official English Code Lyoko YouTube channel on September 5th, 2015, this episode was listed under the title "By a Hair's Breadth". The video's title was corrected around April of 2023, although the video's description continues to refer to the episode by the wrong title.)"	November 26, 2003	May 5, 2004	113
Taking a different approach to his research, Jeremy materializes a single hair of Aelita's. Unfortunately, the follow-up test goes awry, and Jeremy has to find out why. Meanwhile, different parts of the school begin to crumble apart. Jeremy learns that his first test damaged Aelita's program, and she'll be deleted if she tries to deactivate a tower. On top of that, they learn that XANA is responsible for the damage being caused to the school by using ultrasonic sound waves, which continues to get worse. Jeremy has to fix the damage he caused in time to save Odd, who ends up trapped inside the school with Milly, Tamiya, and Kiwi. Unfortunately, after two tries, both ending in failure, Aelita, with the help of Yumi and Ulrich, has to deactivate the tower or else Odd, Milly, Tamiya, and Kiwi will be killed. After the return to the past, Yumi remembers that Jeremy said that the hair contained Aelita's entire computer code. Jeremy places the hair in the scanner, virtualizes it to Lyoko, and Aelita is inside the tower she deactivated. Note: In the English dub, when Yumi is seen saying, "I hope he finds the right solution before XANA attacks again," the line is clearly heard in Ulrich's voice.
14	14	"Piège" "The Trap"	December 3, 2003	May 6, 2004	116
It's been a year since the group first discovered the Supercomputer and Aelita, and they decide to throw a surprise party for Aelita. Sissi catches wind of the party and follows Ulrich and Yumi to the factory. On the way there, XANA possesses the factory as a whole. Jeremy and Odd are the first to arrive at the factory, finding the elevator to be inoperable. They head off to find the fuse box. Once Ulrich and Yumi arrive there, Sissi confronts them about it. They tell her to leave, but XANA's earlier possession allows him to trap all three in the elevator and drop them to the bottom of the shaft. Sissi and Yumi come out okay, but Ulrich's arm is broken in the fall. Meanwhile, Jeremy and Odd have to deal with the possessed factory equipment. Odd, Yumi, and Jeremy are safe and are at the Supercomputer room. While Yumi and Odd are getting virtualized, water from the pipelines inside the walls is falling on the elevator, causing it to overflow. While the elevator is halfway filled, Ulrich promises to Sissi that if they make it out alive, he would be nicer to her. When Ulrich and Sissi are about to drown, Aelita deactivates the tower just in time and the return to the past saves them both. Just like Ulrich promised, he is nicer to Sissi at the end.
15	15	"Crise de rire" "Laughing Fit"	December 10, 2003	May 7, 2004	114
In class, Susan teaches the class about nitrous oxide, more commonly known as laughing gas, and its effects. Meanwhile, Yumi's parents are having trouble with their relationship, which Yumi is not too happy about. No one seems to be able to cheer her up, even Ulrich. He eventually manages to do so, however, and helps her find a way to bring her parents back together. During a school production of Romeo and Juliet, XANA possesses the laughing gas in the science room and uses it to attack Odd, who is doing the music. Sissi pours water on him, unaware of the cause of his maniacal laughing. When Odd tells the others about his experience, they realize that XANA must be behind it. The play turns out to be the perfect way to get Yumi's parents back together, so Ulrich, who is forced into playing Romeo, and Yumi, who plays a guard, stay behind while Odd heads to Lyoko. Just as Odd is about to go in, the XANA-possessed gas goes after each member of the group. Odd gets to Lyoko, but the gas goes with him, weakening him. Jeremy is chased away from the factory by the gas and is forced to take refuge in the sewer water. Finally, Ulrich and Yumi are attacked during the play. Aelita and a weakened Odd have to get to the tower before the others laugh themselves to death.
16	16	"Claustrophobie" "Claustrophobia"	December 17, 2003	May 10, 2004	115
When a boy named Theo takes an interest in Sissi, Herb becomes jealous and tries to get him expelled. The situation only gets worse when XANA possesses the cafeteria during lunch, trapping most of the students inside its electrified walls. Jeremy and Yumi leave the cafeteria before this took place. Yumi has to get Aelita to the tower by herself before the cafeteria collapses in on itself.
17	17	"Mémoire morte" "Amnesia"	December 24, 2003	May 11, 2004	117
When Suzanne gives a lesson on nanotechnology, she uses a small machine designed to produce the little robots as an example. Little do they realize that XANA has infected the machine, so when they find it filled with gel, Odd carelessly ends up pushing Ulrich's face into a small scoop of it. Later on, Ulrich gets a headache and faints. When he wakes up, his memory is gone. Sissi is there at the time, so she uses Ulrich's memory loss to convince him that she's his girlfriend. As the rest of the group tries to bring him to his senses, more cases of amnesia occurs, spreading from person to person like a disease. Only after most of the school is affected does Jeremy realize that XANA's produced nanotechnology is responsible. Ulrich goes for backup despite his amnesia until the tower is deactivated.
18	18	"Musique mortelle" "Killer Music"	December 31, 2003	May 12, 2004	118
When XANA creates an MP3 file that puts anyone who listens to it into a coma, Odd ends up being the first victim. Soon, the rest of the city begins to follow, including Ulrich and Jeremy.
19	19	"Frontière" "Frontier"	January 7, 2004	May 13, 2004	120
When Jeremy yells at Aelita, he tries to go to Lyoko to apologize. Unfortunately, while Yumi is transferring him, she makes a scanner error, which leaves him trapped in a virtual limbo between Lyoko and the real world, so Aelita has to retrieve data to recover Jeremy without support in order to bring Jeremy back, but when she gets to the Mountain Sector, there are a couple of Bloks guarding the tower. Yumi is sent to retrieve Jeremy's laptop to virtualize Ulrich, but gets caught and ends up in the principal's office. Ulrich talks to Sissi to see if she could get Yumi off the hook; Sissi agrees, but only if Ulrich will go out with her for two months. Ulrich agrees on one month and kisses her as a down payment.
20	20	"L'âme des robots (Translation: The Soul of Robots)" "The Robots"	January 14, 2004	May 14, 2004	119
During a school robot competition, XANA sends a robot of his own to deal with the group. Ulrich and Yumi are forced to enlist Herb's help to destroy it while Jeremy and Odd head to the factory to deactivate the tower.
21	21	"Gravité zéro" "Zero Gravity Zone"	January 21, 2004	May 17, 2004	121
Just before an official school soccer game, XANA starts nullifying gravity by creating electromagnetic fields around specific areas. Ulrich is unable to help stop XANA this time around, instead needing to impress his parents (particularly his hard to please father), who will be attending the game. The others have to stop XANA before the entire school is sent into orbit.
22	22	"Routine"	January 28, 2004	May 18, 2004	122
After many XANA attacks in a row, Ulrich starts to get tired of fighting XANA. On top of that, he questions his relationship with Yumi and if she feels the same way about him. He begins to hang around a girl named Emily, and Yumi gets jealous, causing a great fight between the group. When XANA activates a tower without disturbing Earth, Jeremy forces Ulrich, Odd, and Yumi all to go to Lyoko to deactivate the tower. After being virtualized, a virus infection occurs on Lyoko because XANA sabotages the devirtualization program, meaning if the group is devirtualized, they will permanently vanish.
23	23	"36^{ème} dessous" "Rock Bottom?"	February 4, 2004	May 19, 2004	123
During a vacation period at the school, the group plans to have a party at Yumi's house. Odd promises to have a DJ at the party. This DJ, named Samantha Knight, is also his girlfriend, who goes to another school. After meeting up, she has Odd take her to the computer room. Once they arrive, she tries to steal a laptop, since she's too poor to afford one. Odd stops her, but ends up being caught by Jim. Meanwhile, XANA causes the ground under the city to melt, making all the buildings sink.
24	24	"Canal fantôme" "Ghost Channel"	February 11, 2004	May 20, 2004	126
After another successful battle against XANA and another return to the past, Ulrich, Odd, and Yumi are nowhere to be found. They, however, do not see anything wrong with where they are. XANA has trapped them in a world of its own design, which is fashioned after the school to ease their suspicions. Meanwhile, in the real world, Jeremy is being questioned on the group's disappearance. However, the world that Ulrich, Odd, and Yumi are in appears to have some glitches in it. Jeremy finds that this world can be accessed through the scanners, and after a near-death experience with XANA's virtual zombies, Aelita manages to save them.
25	25	"Code Terre" "Code: Earth"	February 18, 2004	May 21, 2004	124
Jeremy finally completes his materialization program and prepares to bring Aelita into the real world. At the same time, Jim's suspicions of the group have risen to the point that he's actively trying to discover their secret and he ends up causing Jeremy to injure his ankle while running away from him downstairs in the school. In the infirmary, Jeremy overhears that the principal's going to have to fire Jim, so he tells Jim to help him get to the factory, and in return, Jeremy will tell the principal the whole story. In the end, the tower is deactivated, and Aelita is materialized on Earth.
26	26	"Faux départ" "False Start"	February 25, 2004	May 24, 2004	125
Aelita's materialization program has worked, and she's now living on Earth, but not all is well. When Jeremy pulls the plug, Aelita faints. Jeremy believes that a virus is given to her by XANA while he is bringing her to Earth in the previous episode, which has linked her to the Supercomputer, preventing the group from shutting it off. Furthermore, XANA brings his Kankrelats into the real world in mass numbers and unleashes them on the school.

=== Season 2 (2005–06) ===
- Lyoko's CGI is revamped, making it look a lot brighter than in the first season
- The spelling of Jeremy's name is officially changed from "Jeremie" to "Jeremy"
- As the Supercomputer was updated, Odd lost his ability to see into the future. However, he can still project a small, light purple energy shield in front of himself
- Jeremy has programmed three flying vehicles for the three Lyoko Warriors: the Overwing for Yumi, the Overbike for Ulrich, and the Overboard for Odd
- A fifth Lyoko Sector reveals itself; the central region of the virtual world where all types of data is accessed, including XANA's. The group call it "Sector Five"
- Yumi has an additional Tessen fan, further perfecting her accuracy in taking down several of XANA's monsters all at once. She has also started to utilize her telekinetic abilities to perfect their targeting while in flight
- The creator of the quantum Supercomputer, Lyoko and XANA is revealed to be a former science teacher named Franz Hopper
- Aelita is revealed to be the daughter of Franz Hopper and that she had lost her human memories after being virtualized on Lyoko. Her pink-haired mother, who had disappeared, debuts but only in the memories of Aelita's past life as a human
- XANA finally gains the other half of the Keys to Lyoko from Aelita's subconscious and escapes the Supercomputer

No. overall	No. in season	Title	Original release date	American air date	Prod. code
27	1	"Nouvelle donne" "New Order"	August 31, 2005	September 19, 2005	203
This episode takes place one month after the events of the first season. After discovering Aelita's link to the Supercomputer and the inability to shut off the Supercomputer that stems from it, Jeremy works hard to find new and better ways to fight XANA. To that end, he develops new vehicles for the group. He also develops a new tower-scanning program that instantly detects activated towers, allowing Aelita to live on Earth. The group encounters a new monster in Lyoko, which Odd names a Tarantula. While adjusting to her new life, the class takes a trip to the nearby woods for a scientific field trip. Ulrich wants to partner up with Yumi, but she's already partnered up with someone named William. He comes from another school, having been expelled from it. During the field trip, Aelita and Jeremy partner up. Jeremy is forced to retrieve his laptop, leaving Aelita in the woods. With him gone, Aelita is frightened by visions of wolves, which lead her to a house known as the Hermitage. There, she has even more visions and is attacked by XANA. Once the others arrive to find her, they learn that XANA has possessed the house and uses everything in it to attack them. They find Aelita in a sauna in the basement. XANA tries to trap them all inside and boil them, but only succeeds in catching Ulrich and Yumi. Aelita and Odd head to the factory to shut down the tower before they are boiled alive. Note: In this episode, Ulrich reveals to Odd that he has no idea if Yumi really likes him.
28	2	"Terre inconnue" "Uncharted Territory"	September 7, 2005	September 20, 2005	204
While Aelita adjusts to her new life on Earth, Jeremy and the others investigate the mysterious owner of the Hermitage, Franz Hopper, and his link to the Supercomputer, Lyoko, and XANA. It is discovered that Franz Hopper was a former teacher at Kadic. After being teased by Sissi, Aelita retreats to Lyoko but gets lost. Jeremy finds her in a previously undiscovered fifth sector of Lyoko, labeled Sector 5 by the group.
29	3	"Exploration"	September 14, 2005	September 21, 2005	205
After discovering Sector 5, the group decides to explore it. Yumi is forced to opt out after her continued late-night trips to Lyoko draw the attention of her parents. While in Sector 5, Ulrich and Odd get devirtualized, but do not appear in the real world, so Yumi sneaks out of the house to go to Lyoko and rescue Aelita from the Scyphozoa while Jeremy searches for a way to recover Odd and Ulrich. Unfortunately, Yumi's parents discover that she is missing and alert the school, who in turn discover that the other four are missing as well.
30	4	"Un grand jour" "A Great Day"	September 21, 2005	September 22, 2005	202
After taking another trip to Sector 5 and returning to the school, Aelita talks to Jeremy about not being human, unaware that Sissi is recording their conversation. On top of that, the false data they retrieved from Sector 5 allows XANA to take over the Supercomputer and starts running return trips over and over. Jeremy discovers the return to the pasts are making XANA stronger and more powerful. During the third return trip, XANA possesses Sissi with his newly acquired and greatly strengthened abilities, and goes after Ulrich. Not only does the group have to deal with Sissi, but they also have to stop the return to the pasts from continuing.
31	5	"Mister Pück"	September 28, 2005	September 23, 2005	206
When Aelita's dreams and hallucinations become too disruptive to ignore, the group heads to the Hermitage to discover their source. There, Aelita finds a doll she inexplicably recognizes to be Mister Puck. Hidden on this doll is a key to a train station locker, which contains the heavily encrypted diary of Franz Hopper. Upon its discovery, XANA takes action, possessing Jeremy, to ensure they'll never be able to read it. When they deactivate the tower and Jeremy comes to his senses, Yumi explains to Jeremy why XANA can possess him and not Ulrich, Aelita, Odd, or Yumi. They fight on Lyoko, which gives them more resistance to XANA, and since Jeremy has not gone to Lyoko in a while, even if he has already gone twice, he has less resistance, so Odd comes up with a way to give him more resistance. Jeremy is seen coming out of a scanner, with Odd and Ulrich coming out of the other two. Jeremy vows that that is the last time he sets foot on Lyoko because of a pair of Megatanks. Ulrich does not clearly state this, but it is believed that he is devirtualized by a Megatank.
32	6	"Saint Valentin" "Saint Valentine's Day"	October 5, 2005	September 26, 2005	207
It's Saint Valentine's Day and romance is blossoming in the air. Ulrich forgets, so at last minute writes a poem for Yumi. However, when William presents Yumi with flowers, Ulrich gets jealous and reads the poem to Sissi instead, hoping to elicit jealousy from Yumi. In return, Yumi kisses William on the cheek. Ulrich and Yumi end up in a fight, both bothered and wondering if the other really likes them. Additionally, a man possessed by XANA leaves a necklace at Aelita's door. Aelita is convinced that it is Jeremy who got it for her. Since Jeremy did not get it, he's left to wonder who did, and ends up suspecting Odd, who avoids the question. This puts the two at odds, so to speak. Meanwhile, Aelita's necklace takes control of her and forces her to deliver herself to the Scyphozoa. Luckily, Odd arrives in time, and is able to save Aelita from the Scyphozoa by "threatening" to kill her.
33	7	"Mix final" "Final Mix"	October 12, 2005	September 27, 2005	208
When the school holds a concert in the gym, William accidentally drops a mixing board for the DJ contest. Odd offers to fix it, and tries to get Jeremy to help. Jeremy is busy, so Aelita offers her help. She easily fixes the device, and finds that she is quite talented in using it. The school is holding its finals, as well, and Odd finds that he is not prepared in the least. Meanwhile, XANA possesses Jim and takes Aelita to the factory in order to deliver her to the Scyphozoa.
34	8	"Chaînon manquant" "Missing Link"	October 19, 2005	September 28, 2005	209
During a mission to Sector 5, the Scyphozoa attacks Yumi, stealing her human DNA, leaving her trapped on Lyoko. To make matters worse, it's picture day for her class and she will be suspended if absent. After some discussion, Ulrich gets the idea to have Sissi stand in for Yumi. Strangely, Sissi agrees and asks for nothing in return. During this, Jeremy tries to come up with a way to bring Yumi back. Aelita thinks of a way, but will not tell Jeremy about it. She only tells him once on Lyoko, so he cannot object. She begins to transfer her own genetic code to Yumi, which will let XANA take her memory at will, and thus will be exposed. Luckily, Odd and Ulrich get there in time to stop her. Meanwhile, Jeremy figures out that Yumi's human DNA code should be stored in XANA's memory, which is accessible through Sector 5.
35	9	"Les jeux sont faits" "The Chips Are Down"	October 26, 2005	September 29, 2005	210
When Ulrich learns that Yumi might have to go back to Japan because her father lost his job, he cannot accept losing her. After hearing the lottery numbers on the radio though, he gets an idea. Using a return trip, Ulrich is able to get a ticket with the winning numbers and give it to her parents. When the others find out, they kick him out of the group until they can figure out what to do. To make matters worse, XANA activates a tower and possesses Nicolas. On top of that, he creates an army of Krabs to guard it.
36	10	"Marabounta"	November 2, 2005	September 30, 2005	211
After deciphering a part of Franz Hopper's diary, Jeremy gets an idea to make a monster that fights on the side of good. By combining techniques, he makes the Marabounta, a black sphere that can exponentially replicate itself endlessly and devour any monster it may encase. Though it works quite well to begin with, everything goes wrong when it senses Aelita's virus, which is linked to XANA. After Odd attacks it to save her, the Marabounta goes haywire and threatens to devour all of Lyoko, so XANA sends his monsters to help destroy the Marabounta in order to protect Aelita and her memories. The monsters leave the Lyoko Warriors without causing any trouble. In a side story, Ulrich follows Yumi to the pool because of his jealousy towards William who is also at the pool with her.
37	11	"Intérêt commun" "Common Interest"	November 9, 2005	October 3, 2005	212
When the Supercomputer's main nuclear battery starts failing, XANA is forced to possess a local criminal named Peter Duncan to replace it. The Supercomputer's periodic shutdowns threaten not only XANA, but also Aelita, whose heart stops beating with each shutdown due to her connection to the Supercomputer. XANA soon captures Jeremy to change the battery to the Supercomputer.
38	12	"Tentation" "Temptation"	December 7, 2005	November 25, 2005	213
After XANA's attack, Jeremy insists on a return to the past, regardless of the fact that XANA does not cause any damage. When questioned, he gets defensive and angry, insisting that it's necessary. Further questioning on the matter leads to the same result. After the next return to the past, Jeremy is found unconscious in his room. Yumi and Ulrich go searching through Jeremy's room to see what they can find about Jeremy's problem. Upon decoding a video diary that is stored on his computer, they learn that he is using the return to the pasts to increase his own intelligence. When he's about to be taken to the hospital, XANA attacks, possessing the ambulance and driving it towards the river with Yumi with him. Now the others have to save Jeremy and deactivate the tower without Jeremy's help.
39	13	"Mauvaise Conduite (Translation: Misconduct)" "A Bad Turn"	November 16, 2005	October 26, 2005	214
When Ulrich tries to tell Yumi how he really feels after some prodding by the rest of the group, he finds her talking to William, who is doing the same thing Ulrich had planned to. Yumi turns him down, but Ulrich leaves before hearing it. Meanwhile, XANA activates a tower and materializes a Krab. At school, a driving class has been set up to teach the kids road safety. William turns out to be a good driver and Ulrich a rather poor one, which William makes fun of him for. The two then get into a fistfight, much to Yumi's annoyance. William and Ulrich both get detention because of the fight. Jeremy learns of the activated tower shortly after and the group heads to the factory without Ulrich. During this time, the Krab makes its way to Yumi's house. When the group reaches the factory, they find a second Krab guarding it. Yumi learns of the first Krab from Hiroki and goes to help while Odd distracts another Krab so they can get to the elevator. In the scanner room, they learn that the first two Krabs destroyed the scanners that produced them, leaving just one usable. Aelita goes to Lyoko first. Before Odd can go, however, a third Krab is materialized, preventing any further use of the scanners. Now Odd has to deal with this Krab, Ulrich and William have to deal with the second, and Yumi and her family have to deal with the first. Not only that, but Aelita has to make her way to the tower without any support, and uses her creativity ability to make a decoy for the Scyphozoa.
40	14	"Contagion" "Attack of the Zombies"	November 23, 2005	October 4, 2005	215
When XANA possesses Kiwi, it turns him into the carrier for a virulent virus that turns those it infects into zombies. To make matters worse, Aelita and Jeremy are stuck in the cafeteria and cannot get to the factory. On top of that, Odd is a zombie himself. Jeremy and Aelita escape but Ulrich and the other students (except William, who is turned into one himself) fight the rest.
41	15	"Ultimatum"	November 30, 2005	October 5, 2005	216
After XANA possesses Principal Delmas and kidnaps Odd and Yumi, he gives Jeremy an ultimatum: deliver Aelita to the Scyphozoa or sacrifice Odd and Yumi. However, Jeremy and Aelita go to Sissi for help after being questioned by the police. Sissi agrees to be temporarily part of the group to help save her father and stop XANA.
42	16	"Désordre (Translation: Disorder)" "A Fine Mess"	December 14, 2005	October 6, 2005	217
After a malfunction and a little bug with the regular materialization program, Odd and Yumi are bugged up, ending up in each other's bodies. Even worse, their atoms start splitting after a while due to being devirtualized, even on Lyoko. The gang has to go to Lyoko and fix the problem before Odd and Yumi disintegrate and disappear forever, but it's not easy when XANA tries to stop them.
43	17	"Mon meilleur ennemi (Translation: My Best Enemy)" "XANA's Kiss"	January 11, 2006	October 7, 2005	201
XANA creates a ghost called a polymorphic specter, that can change its shape or form at will and does not need to possess a host, then uses it to drive a wedge between the group by having it kiss people while disguised as them. At the end of the episode, Aelita kisses Jeremy to see how he'll react. He predictably freezes up.
44	18	"Vertige" "Vertigo"	January 11, 2006	October 24, 2005	218
After a trip to Sector 5, Jeremy believes he has the data necessary to cure Aelita's virus. While the two work on the cure, Odd, Ulrich, and Yumi go to a rock climbing contest. Odd races against Herb, who is no match for Odd. William then goads Ulrich into racing, despite his obvious reluctance. During the race, Ulrich gets dizzy and falls. Yumi realizes that he must have vertigo. Ulrich, embarrassed, runs off. Meanwhile, Jeremy finds the antivirus software and gives it to Aelita. Despite some problem with the application, it seems to work. However, this does not last; an error in the anti-virus causes her to turn invisible. On top of that, she cannot enter the towers on Lyoko, making it impossible for her to stop XANA's latest attack, which is a possessed pack of wolves targeting Odd, Ulrich, and Yumi.
45	19	"Guerre froide" "Cold War"	January 18, 2006	October 25, 2005	221
Jeremy is woken up to an alarm signal, with no activated towers, so he goes back to sleep. The next morning, while Jeremy and Aelita are investigating Jeremy's computer, Odd looks for his DVD of his movie to show the famous news reporter T.V. (Thomas Vincent), who is coming to the school to do a report on the lackluster of today's schools. Later, another tower is activated and Odd, Ulrich and Aelita are sent to Lyoko, only for the tower to deactivate itself. Then another tower activates and deactivates. Jeremy and Aelita stay at the factory while Odd, Ulrich, and Yumi go back to school. Finally, one more tower is activated and it starts to snow, which then turns into a blizzard, trapping the three at the school. While they try to get to the factory, the find Sissi, Herb, and T.V. in T.V.'s car, crashed into a tree. As the tree timbers, Yumi pushes Ulrich out of the way and gets trapped in the process. Ulrich stays with Yumi and Odd goes to the factory. The tower is deactivated before Yumi and Ulrich freeze to death.
46	20	"Empreintes (Translation: Footprints)" "Déjà Vu"	January 18, 2006	October 27, 2005	220
Aelita's visions become a problem once again, but not the same visions as before. This time, she has visions of her and Franz Hopper being chased by government agents. The visions come even when she's awake, causing her to lose consciousness while at the pool. Wanting to know the source of the visions, she heads to the Hermitage to learn more about them. Jeremy believes that XANA is causing the visions through her link to the Supercomputer. During the mission to stop them, Aelita breaks away and heads to Sector 5, determined to discover the source of the visions.
47	21	"Au meilleur de sa forme" "Tip-Top Shape"	January 25, 2006	October 28, 2005	222
During the school physicals, XANA possesses the school nurse, Yolanda, and has her kidnap Aelita. The rest of the group beat her to the factory, but have no way to get Aelita from the far more powerful nurse. Having no other choice, Jeremy decides to test out an experiment which will give a person the same powers as one possessed by XANA. To do this, he has to activate a tower like XANA. Odd volunteers, and is enhanced by a ghost of Jeremy's design. This allows Odd to fight the nurse effectively while the others deactivate the tower. This fortune does not last. XANA is able to take over Jeremy's tower, reversing the effect of the ghost to drain Odd's energy. Meanwhile, on Lyoko's Mountain Sector, XANA makes everything invisible. Now the group has to deactivate not only the original tower, but the tower that is draining Odd's life energy.
48	22	"Esprit frappeur (Translation: Poltergeist)" "Is Anybody Out There?"	January 25, 2006	November 1, 2005	226
After reading about a dead man named Leon Corbe, who died during the construction of Kadic, Sissi decides to hold a séance to communicate with him. She manages to convince Ulrich to attend. During the séance, one of XANA's ghosts appears in the form of a four-armed monster. At first, it seem docile, but quickly gets angry and attacks. Ulrich leaves Sissi with Odd while he goes to tell Jeremy. Jeremy cannot find an activated tower, which seems wrong considering the situation. As Jim patrols the hallways, he is picked up by an invisible object. Jeremy, Odd, and Ulrich arrive to spray it with a fire extinguisher, confirming that it's a ghost and implying that the super scan is broken. With the ghost on the loose, the group heads off to the factory. After they arrive, Aelita, Odd, and Yumi head to Lyoko. Odd looks for the tower while the other two head to Sector 5 to fix the super scan. Meanwhile, Jeremy and Ulrich are left to deal with the ghost.
49	23	"Franz Hopper"	February 1, 2006	October 31, 2005	223
Jeremy discovers five activated towers and gathers the group to take care of them. However, when they arrive at the factory, they find a man at the interface, deactivating the towers as if it were a simple matter to do so. When questioned, the man claims that he's none other than Franz Hopper. However, something seems off about this convenient arrival. Franz says that the scanners cause cell degeneration, and blames it and the destruction of his diary on Jeremy. With everyone except Aelita angry at him, Jeremy calls his father and asks to be withdrawn from Kadic in favor of a school for gifted students – but after he hangs up, while pondering his dilemma, he realizes that there is something inherently wrong with Franz's explanation. XANA has activated a tower in Sector 5 to create a polymorphic clone of Franz Hopper, but Aelita deactivates it in time.
50	24	"Contact"	February 1, 2006	November 25, 2005	219
During a short film made by Odd and starring Sissi, Sissi seems to be possessed by a ghost. She does not act as expected, however. Instead, she starts speaking in an unknown language, focusing on Jeremy as she does. She is taken to the infirmary as a result. Later on, she walks into Jeremy's room and writes some code on a piece of paper. Jeremy translates the code, revealing a message stating a desire to help. Sissi is sent to the hospital after this, forcing Odd and Yumi to go there and collect her. On a trip to Lyoko, Aelita and Ulrich discover a white tower. XANA is not happy about the tower, and sends Megatanks to shut it down forcibly. At the same time, it activates a tower and possesses a nurse at the hospital to do the same to Sissi. Odd and Yumi are able to prevent the nurse from doing so. They bring Sissi to the factory to finish the message she started earlier. She manages to type most of it out before XANA succeeds in shutting down the white tower. After XANA's tower is shut down, Jeremy translates the message, revealing that Franz Hopper has activated the white tower.
51	25	"Révélation" "Revelation"	February 8, 2006	December 9, 2005	224
It is nearing the end of the year and Jeremy's research has hit a dead end. After the group collects more data from Sector 5, he plans to use a tower to decipher Franz Hopper's diary. Before the mission, Odd gets a message from a mystery girl. When he goes to meet her, he is attacked by one of XANA's ghosts and locked inside a well at the Hermitage. The ghost then assumes Odd's form and goes to Lyoko in his place. The tower that XANA activated to make the ghost then deactivates, confusing Jeremy. Putting it out of his mind, he begins his plan to decipher the diary. Shortly after they begin, the ghost turns on the group, devirtualizing Yumi and chasing Ulrich away from the tower as three Tarantulas arrive to protect it. At the same time, XANA attempts to take over Jeremy's tower, locking the decoding procedure so they cannot abandon it. Jeremy realizes the true nature of the ghost during the fight, and Yumi goes off to find the real Odd. After the ghost proves to be ineffective against Ulrich, it shapeshifts into a clone of Ulrich. In this form, it proves to be an equal match for him. After much fighting, Ulrich finally beats the clone, but is taken out by a Tarantula shortly after. Just when it looks like Jeremy's tower will fall, Franz Hopper steps in and protects it. The diary then decodes fully. After examining the diary, Jeremy tells Aelita that she is Franz Hopper's daughter, much to her shock.
52	26	"Réminiscence" "The Key"	February 8, 2006	December 9, 2005	225
After reading Franz Hopper's diary, Jeremy discovers the truth behind the Supercomputer, at least to some extent. Hopper has used it quite extensively, to the point of repeating a single day for more than seven years. His sanity degraded throughout the experience. Hopper also revealed that he and Aelita hold the Keys to Lyoko, which were what XANA is after so he can escape the supercomputer. Jeremy also discovers Aelita never had a virus, and XANA had taken a fragment of her, which is responsible for linking her to the Supercomputer. Aelita is not willing to go, angry over the fact Hopper has essentially taken her life from her. She's also worried that XANA might escape, so she goes to the factory alone and shuts down the Supercomputer. Jeremy rescues her, and the group goes to Lyoko to retrieve her fragment. After all their efforts, they seem to succeed, but it turns out to be a fake. XANA manages to devirtualize Aelita's defenders and steal her memory, effectively killing her and allowing him to escape, which shuts down Lyoko in the process. After his escape, Franz Hopper revives Aelita and Lyoko, restoring all of Aelita's memories in the process, but at the price of Franz Hopper remaining permanently trapped inside the Supercomputer. Through the restoration, Aelita finally remembers her past up to the point that she went to Lyoko. With XANA now free and Aelita's memories returned, neither are linked to the Supercomputer. This means that they could shut it down, but it would do no good. Unsure of how they'll proceed, Jeremy promises that they'll find a way to stop XANA.

=== Season 3 (2006) ===
- The 44/46-minute two-part special "XANA Awakens" was produced and aired as part of the third season; set roughly a year before "Teddygozilla"
  - Jeremy discovers the Supercomputer, turns it on and finds Aelita inside. Having no memory of who she is, Jeremy gives her the name "Maya"
  - Odd (who was virtualized accidentally in place of Kiwi) and Ulrich are virtualized in the Forest Sector, where Jeremy first discovered Aelita
  - XANA's very first attack was generating electricity, possessing machines and wires, and manifesting an electric specter in the shape of an orb to eliminate the group.
  - Yumi Ishiyama, mistakenly called "Yuri" by Ulrich, is virtualized in the Ice Sector, where the very first activated tower is
  - Sissi Delmas is revealed to have known about the Supercomputer and Lyoko, but divulged the information to her father and Jim Morales out of fear of the danger posed by XANA.
  - Aelita learns her name upon touching the interface of the activated tower
  - Aelita's very first use of her only power of "creativity" was when she instinctively made a wall of solid ice to defend Yumi
  - Yumi and Odd never discover their abilities of telekinesis and "future flash" nor Ulrich his "super sprint", triplication, and triangulation.
- Team Lyoko discover the very Heart/Core of Lyoko itself: a huge white sphere with a holographic image of Lyoko in its center, protected by two cube-shaped shields. XANA seeks to destroy the Core, prompting the complete destruction of Lyoko and leaving the heroes with no way to fight the evil multi-agent system
- Having become fully human since regaining the memories of her past life on Earth, Aelita can now be rematerialized normally via the scanners like the rest. She can fight monsters all on her own by emitting small, pink orbs of energy called "energy fields" from her hands which are capable of destroying a single monster from a distance
- To prevent the Lyoko Warriors from reaching Sector 5, XANA has his Scyphozoa possess Aelita and uses her to erase the four main Sectors one by one by entering "Code: XANA" in a way tower.
- Jeremy eventually discovers a way to materialize the Lyoko Warriors directly into Sector 5.
- William Dunbar is chosen to be the sixth member of the Lyoko Warriors in hopes of strengthening their efforts to defeat XANA once and for all. However, on his first virtual mission, he is possessed by XANA and used to destroy the Core, wiping out Lyoko
- Aelita's long-lost father, Franz Hopper, is revealed to be alive somewhere in the internet, having managed to escape the disintegration of Lyoko

No. overall	No. in season	Title	American air date	French air date	Prod. code
53	1	"Le réveil de XANA partie 1" "XANA Awakens, Part 1"	October 2, 2006	October 21, 2006	309
In a prequel to "Teddygozilla", twelve-year-old Jeremy discovers a quantum supercomputer in an abandoned factory. Within, he finds that the computer runs a world parallel to Earth, a virtual world called Lyoko, along with an artificial intelligence Jeremy decides to name Maya. Jeremy tries to help Maya as much as he can with understanding what she is doing on Lyoko. With the Supercomputer active, strange events begin to plague Jeremy. He finds new friends he reveals the computer to. Additionally, Ulrich meets the mysterious but beautiful Yumi who beats him in a duel; much to his shock.: Chronologically, this is the show's two-part 44/46-minute long premiere set roughly a year before "Teddygozilla"
54	2	"Le réveil de XANA partie 2" "XANA Awakens, Part 2"	October 3, 2006	October 21, 2006	310
Realizing the danger the Supercomputer represents, Jeremy takes the advice of his three new friends and decides to shut it down, but not before materializing Maya (Aelita) into the real world. Meanwhile, the strange events become a consistent problem when an electric orb begins hunting Jeremy and his friends. When the orb attacks Ulrich and Yumi, a stubborn Yumi demands to know what is going on, forcing Ulrich to take her to the Supercomputer with him. In a trip to Lyoko, Ulrich, Odd, a rebellious boy, and a newly recruited Yumi work together to get Maya to the red tower under the assumption that it will bring her to the real world. This assumption is ultimately false, shutting down the attack on Earth rather than materializing her. Jeremy then discovers another sentient being, an evil, rogue artificial intelligence called "XANA", which is causing the attacks in the real world. Maya (who discovers her real name of Aelita when shutting down the tower) suggests they shut down the Supercomputer, but the threesome decides to help Jeremy until Aelita is successfully materialized into the real world. Thus, the Lyoko Warriors are formed.
55	3	"Straight to Heart" "Droit au cœur"	October 4, 2006	September 9, 2006	301
After another three-week vacation, the group is still looking for a way to fight XANA. XANA, meanwhile, is trying to destroy Lyoko, preventing them from doing just that. He does so by targeting the core, which contains the code that maintains the virtual world. In a side story, Odd blackmails Jim into asking Principal Delmas to make Odd have the same classes as his friends. Additionally, Yumi decides against having a relationship with Ulrich and decides it would be better if they were just friends. While defending the core, Aelita is suddenly devirtualized by the enemy. However, she still ends up back in the scanners and Jeremy realizes that this is because Aelita is fully human, just like the rest of the group, so she does not need Code: Earth anymore to be materialized on Earth.: Aelita obtains a "weapon" of her own: Deep pink orbs of electrical energy called "energy fields". And along with that newly acquired ability, she can also create a deep pink shield.
56	4	"Lyoko Minus One" "Lyokô moins un"	October 5, 2006	September 16, 2006	302
During a field trip with the rest of her 10th grade class, Yumi finds herself facing off against the students, teachers, and bus driver, all of whom XANA has possessed. At the same time, XANA plans to get rid of Lyoko through alternate means: destroying each sector one at a time. To this end, he uses the Scyphozoa to possess Aelita and enter Code: XANA into the way tower, wiping out the Forest Sector completely. Jeremy then realizes that with the four main sectors gone, they will not be able to go to Sector 5.
57	5	"Tidal Wave" "Raz de marée"	October 6, 2006	September 23, 2006	303
XANA attacks the Lyoko warriors by possessing a large amount of food. At the same time, he bugs up the Mountain Sector by raising the level of the Digital Sea, but Odd and Aelita go to Sector 5 to stop him. XANA also mounts an attack on Lyoko's core at the same time.
58	6	"False Lead" "Fausse Piste"	October 10, 2006	September 30, 2006	304
When XANA hacks into a weapon's manufacturing computer network and leaves a paper trail pointing to Jeremy, government agents arrive at the school looking for him. Then, the whole gang arrive at the factory. When they end up tracking Jeremy to the factory, XANA possesses them for an attack on the Supercomputer itself in the Ice Sector, and in the Mountain Sector.
59	7	"Aelita"	October 11, 2006	October 7, 2006	305
Aelita gets mad at Jeremy and she and Odd go into Lyoko without telling anybody, which causes problems. On Lyoko, XANA creates a diversion to get everybody to deactivate the tower in the Mountain Sector while the monsters (mostly Mantas and Creepers) worked on destroying the core of Lyoko. At the end of the episode, Jeremy and Aelita find a strand of DNA that belongs to Franz Hopper, indicating he may be still alive. Meanwhile, Odd is hit with the realization that his feet smell.
60	8	"The Pretender" "Le prétendant"	October 12, 2006	October 14, 2006	306
Odd and Ulrich are talking in the shower room when a young boy, Johnny, asks to talk to Ulrich. It turns out that Johnny likes Yumi, and being jealous of that, Ulrich tells him to follow her around to get her attention, which Yumi hates. After following her all day and ending up in the gym, a flock of crows possessed by XANA attacks Yumi. She is beaten unconscious by their electrified beaks and sent to the hospital. Meanwhile, as Jeremy and the others are fighting monsters to deactivate the tower, the Scyphozoa possesses Aelita and has her enter Code: XANA into the way tower, wiping out the Desert Sector for good and leaving Lyoko with two main Sectors – the Mountain Sector and the Ice Sector. Once Jeremy finds out, he activates a return to the past with strong hope for Yumi's life. When Johnny comes and asks for Ulrich's advice again Ulrich gives him the right one. This episode proves that Ulrich is not as comfortable as being just good friends with Yumi as he says he is.
61	9	"The Secret" "Le secret"	October 13, 2006	October 21, 2006	307
After being rejected by Yumi, William makes it his mission to find out the secret she's hiding. Soon enough, he manages to follow Ulrich and Odd to the factory and learns about Lyoko and XANA. Meanwhile, in the Ice Sector, the Scyphozoa possesses Aelita to enter Code: XANA in the way tower, but is devirtualized just in time by Yumi. The group thinks William's help is going to be quite useful, when a possessed demolition worker sets several bombs in the factory. They take a vote as to whether or not to include William as part of their group, but Yumi votes no and Jeremy initiates a return to the past.
62	10	"Temporary Insanity" "Tarentule au plafond (Translation: Tarantula on the Ceiling) (Note: A play on "avoir une araignée au plafond", the French equivalent to the English expression "have a screw loose".)"	October 16, 2006	November 1, 2006	308
Before leaving Sector 5, Odd and Ulrich are hit by a strange red beam from a pair of Mantas. They both eventually begin to act strange in the real world during a school play. They start seeing their environment, people as enemies, and fight as if they were still on Lyoko. They are branded as insane and hospitalized while Jeremy tries to figure out what happened. After finding the cause and devising a cure, Jeremy has Yumi and Aelita break them out of the hospital. Meanwhile, XANA uses their handicap to mount an attack on Lyoko's core. Yumi heads to protect the Core of Lyoko, as Aelita tries to help the boys who instead now see the real world while on Lyoko.
63	11	"Sabotage"	October 17, 2006	November 2, 2006	311
When XANA sabotages the Supercomputer, weird bugs begin cropping up in Lyoko. With its power rapidly draining, Jeremy needs to repair it before it becomes completely useless. However, he seems to forget about boys' dorm inspection, so Jim forces him to stay behind. Meanwhile, XANA possesses vines to trip up the rest of the group, except Aelita. Since the attack keeps draining power from the Supercomputer, with no other choice, Aelita purposefully wipes out the Ice Sector leaving only the Mountain Sector left.
64	12	"Nobody in Particular" "Désincarnation (Translation: Disembodiment)"	October 18, 2006	November 3, 2006	312
During a test to materialize Ulrich directly into Sector 5, his mind and body become separated, leaving Ulrich's body trapped on Lyoko and his incorporeal mind stuck on Earth. What's worse, XANA possesses Ulrich's body and uses it to attack the Core of Lyoko. Meanwhile, Suzanne, disappointed with Ulrich's bad grades, tries to place him in remedial classes.
65	13	"Triple Trouble" "Triple Sot (Translation: Triple Fool)"	October 19, 2006	November 6, 2006	314
When Odd complains that he does not have any cool powers on Lyoko like his friends, Jeremy designs him a teleportation ability. It works, but ends up leaving duplicates of himself in the location he teleported from in the Mountain Sector. After trying it twice, Jeremy devirtualizes Odd to find out what went wrong, accidentally creating two clones of Odd himself. Meanwhile, in the real world, XANA attacks using a mysterious smoke turning anyone it hits to stone. One of Odd's copies gets turned to stone, so the other two Odds must retrieve him before they become unstable and disappear.
66	14	"Double Trouble" "Surmenage (Translation: Overworked)"	October 20, 2006	November 7, 2006	313
With XANA's attacks becoming more and more difficult to handle, the group contemplates adding another member to the team to make things easier. William is the prime candidate, but Yumi still does not trust him. While Jeremy works on a way to get to Sector 5 directly, XANA makes a clone of him and has it take Jeremy's place. Meanwhile, Yumi has missed one too many classes, and will be expelled if she misses another. Odd and Yumi end up bugged by Jeremy's clone, preventing them from rescuing Aelita from the Scyphozoa. The Scyphozoa possesses Aelita, having her enter Code: XANA into the way tower, wiping out the Mountain Sector, cutting off access to Sector 5. However, Jeremy completes his program to send the group to Sector 5 directly. The group decides that they need another member and Yumi asks William for his help which for her he happily agrees to do.
67	15	"Final Round" "Dernier round"	October 23, 2006	November 8, 2006	315
After William is initiated into the group, a series of events leaves only him and Aelita to defend Lyoko's core. During William's first mission to Lyoko, XANA uses the Scyphozoa to possess him, making him the general of a massive army focused on Lyoko's core. Despite their best efforts, the group cannot stop the possessed William from destroying the core, which both renders the Supercomputer useless and transforms William into a darker, XANA-themed version of himself. Later, in the Hermitage, while the group broods over their predicament, Jeremy receives a coded message directly from the internet, sent by none other than Franz Hopper who somehow survived the destruction of Lyoko.

=== Season 4 (2007) ===
- The quintet all don new attire on Earth since "Maiden Voyage"
- Yumi, Aelita, Odd, and Ulrich don new attire on Lyoko. In addition, their weaponry is slightly upgraded/modified, and respective abilities are somewhat boosted:
  - Yumi's only ability of telekinesis now enables her to mentally move and hurl several objects all at once, and feels much less exhausted by placing her fingers on the horse pill-shaped things above her eyebrows, now able to use it for longer periods without tiring out. She continues to rarely use it, not even as a specter on Earth, despite the fact that it has gotten a lot stronger.
  - Ulrich gets an additional katana, but his "triangulate" ability is never used; his triplicate is only used in "Double Take". Neither are used when he is a specter on Earth.
  - Odd's purple energy shield has expanded to the point that it covers his legs. As a specter on Earth, it has a pinkish hue as seen in its only use in "Down to Earth."
  - Aelita has white-pink angel wings, which are activated by waving her hand over a star-shaped bracelet, allowing her to fly and carry one other person. Her "creativity" power has strengthened to the point that she can deactivate a sealed door, which Jeremy calls "her digital powers." Her psychic ability of "second sight" is used only in "Kadic Bombshell" to detect XANA's pulsations.
- Having been under XANA's power for quite some time, William is given an ability called "Supersmoke" which is similar to Ulrich's "Supersprint." His larger sword "Zweihander" can generate an energy discus and he can also levitate, and see what is happening from great distances away.
- Additional supercomputers are discovered to be hidden across the globe, each generating a replica of a single sector of Lyoko. Jeremy devises a teleportation method to materialize his friends at the site of these supercomputers on Earth.
- Aelita's long-lost mother is revealed to have been abducted by the ominous Men in Black and has not been seen or heard from in four years; her first name is also revealed to be Anthea in "Wrong Exposure."
- Franz Hopper himself (whose full name is revealed to be Waldo Franz Schaeffer) finally debuts but as a white energy sphere, as he is incapable of virtualizing himself onto Lyoko in his human form like his daughter. Unfortunately, he ultimately sacrifices himself to enable Jeremy to obliterate XANA once and for all.
- A replica for the Mountain Region is never shown.
- Sissi Delmas learns of their virtual adventures as heroes, prompting a final return to the past, after which the team welcomes her as a friend.

No. overall	No. in season	Title	English air date	French air date	Prod. code
68	1	"William Returns" "Renaissance"	May 18, 2007	August 13, 2007	401
Using the data that Franz Hopper gave them, Jeremy and Aelita succeed in recreating Lyoko, which now holds only Sector 5. Soon after, William is materialized, and seems perfectly normal. He shows up at school much to Yumi's delight and Ulrich's disdain. Sissi decides to make herself "editor-in-chief" of Kadic News, much to Milly and Tamiya's dismay. She soon barges into Aelita's room to interview her and is stopped by William. As soon as William makes Sissi, Tamiya and Milly leave, he kidnaps Aelita and takes her to Lyoko. William leads Aelita out of Sector 5 and to what used to be the Desert Sector. His intent is revealed to throw Aelita into the Digital Sea. Odd manages to stop him, but William dives into the Digital Sea. Jeremy concludes that this is XANA's new strategy and that they must be very careful.
69	2	"Double Take" "Mauvaise réplique (Translation: Bad Replica)"	June 12, 2007	August 14, 2007	402
In order to compensate for William, who is still under XANA's control, Jeremy sets to work designing brand-new virtual attire and digital "enhanced" weaponry and abilities for his friends and recreating the rest of Lyoko. In order to buy himself time to do this, he activates a tower and uses it to create a clone of his own to attend class in his place. Meanwhile, William's absence is drawing attention, from both the principal and his father. While Jeremy's clone is impressing Jim outside, William appears on Lyoko and tries to put the tower under his master's control. In order to maintain his clone, Jeremy draws more virtual strength from Sector 5 to maintain the activated tower. He eventually runs out of digital energy and the tower is put back under XANA's control. While Odd holds the Jeremy clone off, Aelita, Yumi, and Ulrich go to Lyoko with new outfits and somewhat much stronger abilities and slight improvements of their old weapons. They eventually deactivate the tower. William threatens to push Yumi into the Digital Sea, but before doing so he comes back to his senses. Yumi is saved from the fall by Odd at the last second. Jeremy then initiates a return to the past and creates a William clone to prevent any suspicion about his absence.: This is the last time Ulrich used his triplicate ability.
70	3	"Opening Act" "Première partie"	June 19, 2007	August 30, 2007	407
Jim's nephew, Chris, the drummer of the Subdigitals, pays a visit to Kadic to look for an opening act for the band's next concert. Everybody tries out, and Aelita turns out to be the one Chris is looking for. However, circumstances make sure that Chris does not realize who Aelita is, and XANA's clone of him only complicates matters, kidnapping Aelita and sending her to Lyoko. Jim and Chris manage to involve themselves in their search for Aelita, and end up battling the clone while the rest of the group tries to deactivate the tower. After the threat is over, Jeremy executes a return trip so that Jim and Chris remember nothing. He also delivers Aelita's demo CD to Chris personally after doing so.
71	4	"Wreck Room" "Double foyer"	June 26, 2007	August 15, 2007	405
There is a new recreation room at Kadic and William's clone is put in charge of it. Meanwhile, Jeremy has developed a program to get the real William out of Lyoko. However, the program malfunctions and bugs up the tower, allowing XANA to take it over while Aelita cannot shut it down. As the William clone lashes out at the group, the real William is on Lyoko to keep the tower under XANA's control. Jeremy manages to repair the tower in time for Aelita to reset it, restoring the clone to working order. With a return trip to the past to erase the unwanted memories of William's behavior at school, the group elects Sissi as the rec room monitor.
72	5	"Skidbladnir"	July 3, 2007	August 16, 2007	403
The new virtual, submersible "submarine" (as Jeremy calls it) is almost complete, the last step being a secondary program that needs to be run by 4 PM the next day. However, when Aelita and Jeremy stay up late to set the program up, they are caught and given detention. Meanwhile, William takes the opportunity to attack the incomplete ship, forcing Yumi to run the Supercomputer in Jeremy's absence. Odd and Ulrich are unable to handle the situation, but Jeremy and Aelita are able to sneak out in time to help. Aelita is able to repel William with a massive attack, allowing Jeremy to complete the sub on time. It is later christened the Skidbladnir, nicknamed "the Skid" by Odd, after the Norse ship.
73	6	"Maiden Voyage" "Premier voyage"	July 10, 2007	August 17, 2007	406
The gang manages to convince Jeremy to let them test out the Skid. During this test, the navigation system bugs up, leaving the gang stranded in the digital sea. Jeremy runs to his room to fetch the backup programs, but forgets that it's Fire Safety Day and runs into several teachers, eventually having to scale the roof to get to his room. Meanwhile, the Skid stumbles upon another Lyoko and is attacked by two eel-like monsters. Jeremy is able to repair the navigation system and bring his friends home, after which he surmises that the replica of Lyoko is created from the portion of the Keys to Lyoko that XANA has stolen from Aelita's subconscious in the second season finale, The Key. Jeremy wonders how he plans to use it.
74	7	"Crash Course" "Leçon de choses (Translation: Object Lesson)"	July 17, 2007	August 20, 2007	410
Jeremy decides to teach Odd, Ulrich, and Yumi how to use the Supercomputer in case he or Aelita are unable to, being XANA's favorite targets. During the lesson, Jeremy is attacked by one of XANA's polymorphic clones, leaving the others to operate the Supercomputer without help. Aelita is at the final audition with the Subdigitals, competing against two other candidates, and thus cannot be contacted. To make matters worse, the clone heads for her after dealing with Jeremy. Using what they learned from Jeremy, the others are able to rescue Aelita and deactivate the tower without his help. Aelita is also chosen as the winner of the audition despite her walking out on them.
75	8	"Replika" "Réplika"	July 24, 2007	August 21, 2007	412
The group travels to one of XANA's replica sectors in the Digital Sea. Meanwhile, Aelita and Odd get into a fight after Odd's desire to sleep in gets them both in trouble. Furthermore, their arguing inadvertently leads Nicolas and Herb into the factory, where Jeremy is forced to distract them while the group explores the Lyoko copy, which consists entirely of the Forest Sector. On the Lyoko replica, William and a pair of Megatanks arrive to destroy the Skid, the destruction of which would cut the group off from the Supercomputer. Odd and Aelita refuse to work together when they first arrive, but eventually resolve their differences and take William down. Jeremy surmises that another supercomputer is controlling the Replika (what the Lyoko copies were dubbed as), and in order to get rid of it, he'll have to find a way to materialize his friends at the location of the supercomputer.
76	9	"I'd Rather Not Talk About It" "Je préfère ne pas en parler"	July 31, 2007	August 22, 2007	409
The group turns to Jim for training, so they can be better prepared to fight against XANA. However, things go bad when XANA possesses a boar to attack them with, forcing them to put their training to good use to avoid it. Furthermore, XANA sends William and a group of Mantas to attack Lyoko's core. Jeremy stays behind to help Jim while the others repel the attack. Jeremy risks his life to save Jim when the two encounter their attacker in a cave, and Aelita deactivates the tower in time to save them both.
77	10	"Hot Shower" "Corps céleste (Translation: Celestial Body)"	August 14, 2007	August 23, 2007	413
When a comet passes near Earth, XANA uses a laser-equipped military satellite to split it into chunks, simultaneously aiming the bulk of it directly at the factory. Aelita, Odd, and Ulrich are exploring the digital sea at the time, and XANA traps them with a firewall to prevent them from stopping the attack. Meanwhile, Yumi is stuck at school and, when informed of the attack, works to evacuate the school. Jeremy tells Yumi to connect his laptop to an antenna to tap into the military satellite and destroy the comet. She does so with help from Hiroki and Johnny. However, XANA prevents them from doing so. Unable to stop the attack, Aelita reasons that XANA is more concerned with taking her prisoner than destroying the Supercomputer, and to test her theory, she has Odd devirtualize her. Having guessed correctly, she watches as XANA destroys the comet and calls off his own attack on his own accord.
78	11	"The Lake" "Le lac"	August 21, 2007	August 24, 2007	404
Jeremy, Aelita, Ulrich, and Odd go with the rest of their science class on a field trip to an island in the middle of a nearby lake to study water-based plant life. Yumi, not part of the class, remains behind to sit through two important exams. Jeremy's fears about XANA attacking at such an inopportune moment are realized when XANA creates an electricity-blasting sludge that attacks anyone who approaches the shore. Yumi is forced to go to Lyoko alone. She fights William and during their fight is able to reach his true mind and personality. Though XANA soon manages to regain control of William, Yumi is saved by Aelita, who escaped the island on Sissi's bike. Aelita is able to deactivate the tower and Yumi claims that one day they will bring William home. She initiates a return trip to the past and the class is saved from electrocution.: This episode shows the strong feelings William has for Yumi, since various machines and programs made by Jeremy do not succeed in bringing William back to reality and Yumi's words do.; The quintet are seen in their original attire for the camping trip.
79	12	"Lost at Sea" "Torpilles virtuelles (Translation: Virtual Torpedoes)"	August 28, 2007	August 27, 2007	408
Hiroki steals Yumi's diary and Ulrich finds it. Meanwhile, in a new attempt to free William from XANA's evil clutches, Jeremy creates a program to find William in the Digital Sea. When he uploads the program to the Skid, the sonar becomes bugged, forcing the gang to return to Lyoko. When the Kongers interrupt their return, Yumi gets stranded, and is lost in the Digital Sea. XANA's attempt to take advantage of this alerts Jeremy, allowing him to direct his friends to Yumi. After fighting off the Kongers and William, who has his own ship (the Rorkal) to travel in, they return to Earth. To help Hiroki apologize to his older sister, Ulrich secretly returns the diary.
80	13	"Lab Rat" "Expérience"	(skipped; added online)	August 28, 2007	414
Jeremy has finally perfected his "teleportation" process, allowing him to send his four best friends to the location of XANA's supercomputer in the real world to destroy it and leave no trace of their heroic activities. He uses it on Aelita and Odd first, sending them to the jungle laboratory containing the supercomputer. As they explore, they find that XANA is constructing cybernetic spiders with the help of a team of possessed scientists. Before they can stop him, however, William manages to sever their connection to the real world, bringing them back to Lyoko in the middle of their mission. In a side story, Yumi is angry with Ulrich because he forgot her fifteenth birthday, so Odd promises to get Yumi a present for him, since Ulrich has detention.: For some reason, the theme song's scenes are from the first season
81	14	"Bragging Rights" "Arachnophobie (Translation: Arachnophobia)"	September 8, 2007	August 29, 2007	415
Having failed to destroy XANA's supercomputer in the Amazon, the group sets out to finish the job. Meanwhile, Odd's bragging gets the better of him, and he makes a bet with Ulrich not to brag for 24 hours. However, circumstances conspire to constantly put him in the spotlight, and when he ultimately both defeats William single-handedly and destroys the supercomputer in the real world, Odd becomes convinced that being a braggart is something he can be proud of.
82	15	"Dog Day Afternoon" "Kiwodd"	September 15, 2007	August 29, 2007	416
Odd tries to take Kiwi to Lyoko, but ends up absorbing him instead. As a result, Odd slowly begins to take on dog traits, such as enhanced smell and scratching himself with his foot. While Jeremy works on separating the two, XANA possesses a biker gang to attack Yumi. When Ulrich and Aelita arrive to Lyoko, they are confronted by William and three Tarantulas. Jeremy manages to split Odd and Kiwi while Aelita deactivates the tower.
83	16	"A Lack of Goodwill" "Œil pour œil (Translation: Eye for an Eye)"	September 22, 2007	August 30, 2007	420
Jeremy has developed a program to make the William clone smarter, but the learning curve is still problematic, as it tries to fling a glass into the air from a fork. Milly and Tamiya, overhearing the group's conversation about the clone, decide to ask him personally. The clone, having never been told to keep the information a secret, reveals everything to them, and even takes them to the factory. Meanwhile, Jeremy plans a mission to the next Replika, a copy of the Desert Sector. During the trip, William emerges from a scanner and tries to destroy the supercomputer. With the help of Milly, Tamiya, and the William clone, he is defeated, and a return trip keeps Milly and Tamiya in the dark about the Supercomputer.
84	17	"Distant Memory" "Mémoire blanche"	September 29, 2007	August 31, 2007	422
It's holiday time at Kadic and everyone is headed home. Aelita, however, has no home to go to. As she watches over Lyoko, she gets a message from Franz Hopper, who has constructed a simulation bubble of their mountain home on Lyoko. Though happy to see her father, Aelita quickly learns that the entire thing is a trick from XANA – her father is just an illusion in the simulation bubble on Lyoko. William is there waiting for her in order to throw her in the Digital Sea. However, she escapes resulting in William chasing after her. The rest of the group, having been unable to contact Aelita, follows her onto Lyoko, but they fail to keep William from throwing her into the Digital Sea. When it seems as though Aelita is gone for good, she is lifted from the sea by the real Franz Hopper, who has manifested himself as a floating white bubble with a pink aura. After dropping her back on Lyoko, he returns to the Digital Sea.
85	18	"Hard Luck" "Superstition"	October 6, 2007	September 8, 2007	421
When Odd breaks a mirror, a little bad luck follows and jinxes him everywhere, even on Lyoko. A bug in his virtual avatar spreads to Yumi and Aelita, causing annoying pauses and random devirtualization in the Desert Replika. Meanwhile, at the site of the Replika's supercomputer, XANA materializes Kankrelats in the real world to stop Ulrich and Yumi. Despite the bug, their mission to destroy XANA's next Replika ends in success, this time by Ulrich, and Odd's luck returns soon afterwards.: This is the last time Yumi utilizes her one-and-only enhanced special ability of telekinesis in the series.
86	19	"Guided Missile" "Missile guidé"	October 13, 2007	September 15, 2007	411
Jeremy wins a contest to take a flight in an armed fighter jet, even though it is Odd who entered him into the contest. However, just before takeoff, XANA possesses the jet and sends it to destroy the factory and kill Jeremy by forcing it to crash. As it closes in, Aelita, Odd, Ulrich, and Yumi struggle against William, who devirtualizes them one by one in his attempt to throw Aelita into the Digital Sea. Ulrich is the one to come out on top in a blade to blade fight with William, and Aelita is able to deactivate the tower. A return to the past is launched before the factory is destroyed, and Odd gets his chance to ride in the jet afterwards.
87	20	"Kadic Bombshell" "La belle de Kadic (Translation: The Beauty of Kadic)"	November 3, 2007	September 22, 2007	417
When Sissi's pen pal from Iceland, Brynja Heringsdötir, arrives at the school, all the boys swoon over her, making Sissi envious. When Brynja takes an interest in Odd, he ends up showing her the Supercomputer. While there, she messes with the computer despite Odd's pleas not to, creating a glitch in a program Jeremy is installing that causes every virtualization to happen in the wrong sector and prevents materialization. This becomes all the more problematic when William catches Aelita alone on Lyoko. When forced to choose between his friends and his new love interest, Odd initially stays with her, but decides that his friends are more important. After rescuing Aelita from William, they make up. As Brynja has not been told anything about the purpose of the Supercomputer, nor does it appear that she even cared in the first place, they have no need to perform a return trip to the past before she leaves.: This is the last time Aelita utilized her "second sight" ability to detect XANA's pulsations, which she did frequently in the first season.
88	21	"Canine Conundrum" "Kiwi superstar"	November 10, 2007	September 29, 2007	419
When Kiwi's mindless destruction becomes too much for the group to bear, they force Odd to keep him at the factory. As Odd drops him off, XANA possesses Jeremy's Kiwi robot, turning it into an army of self-replicating attack dogs. The dogs attack Yumi and Ulrich, among other children, during Jim's Pencak silat class. After Aelita deactivates the tower and a return trip erases the incident, the group decides that the regular Kiwi is not that bad, after all.
89	22	"A Space Oddity" "Planète bleue (Translation: Blue Planet)"	November 17, 2007	October 6, 2007	423
Because of a surprise dorm inspection, Odd has to convince Yumi to keep Kiwi at her house. Jeremy, meanwhile, has located the next Lyoko copy, a Replika of Sector 5. Its supercomputer is located on a newly-built space station orbiting Earth. While Odd and Yumi work to disable it, Aelita and Ulrich work to disable the Replika's defenses, which threaten to destroy the Skid. To make matters worse, the supercomputer is guarded by a trio of floating spheres that can grow spikes and melt through metal. In the end, Odd disables the supercomputer by breaking some cooling pipes in the room and damaging it with water. All the while, Yumi's dad, Takeo, has been having fun with Kiwi, much to Odd and Yumi's surprise.
90	23	"Cousins Once Removed" "Cousins ennemis (Translation: Enemy Cousins)"	November 17, 2007	October 13, 2007	427
Jeremy's cousin, Patrick, comes to visit. Jeremy is not entirely happy about it, since Patrick is "super cool" compared to him. Discovering another Replika, Jeremy and his friends plan a mission to destroy it, leaving Sissi alone with Patrick. She is able to convince him to let Herb rummage through Jeremy's computer files. Herb discovers Aelita's forged documents and the program running the Skid, his efforts to decipher it inadvertently draining the Skid's power. To make matters worse, XANA possesses both him and Sissi to cause even more damage. Jeremy, meanwhile, deduces that it's his computer back at school causing the damage, and works with Patrick to stop them. Once the attack has passed, Jeremy has Aelita run a return trip to the past to undo the damage caused. The second time around, Jeremy is a bit more appreciative of his cousin, since the two worked well together before. But, unfortunately Patrick goes back to his own school.: This is the last episode to air on Cartoon Network. The final 7 episodes of the original series were released online.
91	24	"Music to Soothe the Savage Beast" "Il est sensé d'être insensé (Translation: Being Sensible Is Just Not Sensible) (Note: A line from the Subdigital's song S'envoler/Break Away.)"	2007 (online)	October 20, 2007	418
Aelita's first concert with the Subdigitals is coming up, but Aelita's stage fright threatens to get the better of her. Meanwhile, Odd has to find an extra ticket so he can bring a date. When the concert finally starts, XANA attacks, possessing Sophia, the Subdigitals' manager, in order to kidnap Aelita. He also possesses Milly and Tamiya for some extra help. While Ulrich battles the two reporters, the others work to shut down the tower, all while the Subdigitals' music plays in the background. Once the threat is over, Jeremy activates a return to the past so Aelita will not miss the concert.
92	25	"Wrong Exposure" "Médusée (Translation: Dumbfounded) (Note: The title is a pun on the Scyphozoa's French name Méduse and what Delmas says when Sissi shows him the photo of Aelita with Franz Hopper.)"	2007 (online)	October 27, 2007	425
Aelita finds a photo of herself with Franz Hopper at the Hermitage, with a mathematical equation in the background. Jeremy discovers that the program works as a reset feature to Lyoko, something not too helpful, but useful nonetheless. Meanwhile, Odd, in an attempt to impress a girl in photography class, inadvertently sends the photo to Sissi, who in turn shows it to her father. He questions the group about it, with Jeremy pointing out that Aelita would obviously be 22 by now if she were the one in the photo. They are sentenced to detention in the library by Jim before any more discussion occurs. Before he can follow up on the matter, Principal Delmas is possessed by XANA. He delivers Aelita to Lyoko, where the Scyphozoa is waiting for her. It takes control of her and tries to force her to walk into the Digital Sea, but Ulrich and Yumi are there to keep her from doing so. As they battle Aelita and the monsters, Jeremy uses the reset program, clearing Aelita's possession and allowing her to deactivate the tower. After performing a return trip to the past, Aelita explains that her real last name is not Hopper at all, it's Schaeffer (the name listed on the folder in the end credits). Hopper is actually the maiden name of her presumably deceased mother, Anthea. In addition, Franz's supposed first name is actually his middle name, his first name actually being Waldo. Franz apparently changed both his and his young daughter's names when they moved to the Hermitage in order to have a fresh start.
93	26	"Bad Connection" "Mauvaises ondes"	2007 (online)	November 3, 2007	428
Odd is presenting one of his films, but is unhappy because his parents are coming. According to him, they never find fault in anything he does, which he finds dissatisfying, "because he isn't treated like a normal teen." However, when he's finally pressured into it, XANA attacks, using the school's cell phone antenna to spread a virus to everyone who answers their phone to cause them to become vicious, angry, mind controlled slaves, starting with Odd's parents. With the widespread use of cell phones, all but the Lyoko warriors and Sissi are affected, Sissi having had her phone accidentally broken by her father. While she and Odd attempt to evade the possessed students and faculty, the others deactivate the tower in the Mountain Sector. Once a return trip wipes everyone's memories, Odd plays his video, which showcases all the humorous moments at Kadic, with Sissi in particular being treated in a positive light as thanks for her earlier assistance, much to her confusion and surprise.
94	27	"Cold Sweat" "Sueurs froides"	2007 (online)	November 3, 2007	424
When an embarrassing picture of Yumi is printed in the Kadic newspaper, she turns to Odd as the source. He manages to get Ulrich to take the blame, however, causing tension between him and Yumi. Putting that aside, Jeremy sets up a mission to the next Lyoko copy, an Ice Replika. Its supercomputer is located in Siberia, where XANA is growing brains for an unknown purpose. Odd and Yumi are sent to the real world to destroy it, only to be confronted by William. When trying to shut down the tower, Aelita realizes that the data it is generating could be used to free William. After downloading the necessary data and disabling William, everything seems to be set for destroying the Replika. However, XANA draws on the power of his many Replikas to create a new monster: the "Kolossus," a massive creature resembling a fire elemental with a sword for a hand. It easily devirtualizes Aelita and Ulrich, and nearly destroys the Skid, as well. With this new development, and the realization that XANA has hundreds of supercomputers at his command, Jeremy has to change strategies. Meanwhile, Yumi forgives Ulrich for the picture, and Odd admits to his deception soon after. Yumi gets back at both of them by getting a picture of the two coming out of the shower in the paper. After seeing the picture Ulrich chases Odd claiming he will kill him.
95	28	"Down to Earth" "Retour (Translation: Return)"	2007 (online)	November 3, 2007	426
In order to defeat XANA, whom they have vastly underestimated, Jeremy plans to design another multi-agent system to combat him. That, however, is still under development. In more immediate matters, Jeremy has figured out how to free William from XANA, but needs to run his program directly from the Ice Replika's supercomputer. Meanwhile, William's parents visit their son, and the strange behavior of his clone concerns them greatly. Back at the Replika, William and two Mantas come to try to sever the translation. However, the Mantas are quickly destroyed by Yumi and Ulrich. William then jumps into the Digital Void and comes back up with the Kolossus. Jeremy uses some new tricks to stop the Kolossus, allowing Aelita and Odd to reach the supercomputer without worry. However, an army of robotic drones now stationed at the facility complicates matters and they undo Odd's translation. With much effort, Aelita is able to run the program to free William before she is forced back onto Lyoko as well, but their victory comes at a cost: though William is saved, the Skid is destroyed by the Kolossus with Aelita in it. Fortunately, she is devirtualized before the Skidbladnir is totally destroyed. Back on Earth, William is able to take his clone's place, pacifying his concerned parents. Ulrich, meanwhile, has to deal with William's romantic affection for Yumi once more.: Odd utilizes his purple "shield" ability for the first and final time as a specter on Earth and in the overall series.
96	29	"Fight to the Finish" "Contre-attaque (Translation: Counterattack)"	2007 (online)	November 10, 2007	429
With the Skid gone and XANA's replikas at unmanageable numbers, Jeremy continues work on his multi-agent system. Meanwhile, Aelita has nightmares about her father being killed by XANA. As Jeremy works, he is contacted by Franz Hopper, who arranges a meeting on Lyoko. William wants to help, but all except Aelita are a little wary of trusting him again. William is left in the lab with Jeremy. After meeting up, Franz transmits the data necessary to finish Jeremy's multi-agent system. However, XANA is not willing to give up without a fight, activating a tower to possess William once again while sending the Kolossus to deal with Franz. Yumi willingly devirtualizes herself and fights William while the others protect Franz. Once Franz is finished transmitting the data, Aelita and Odd head to Sector 5 to launch the program. Ulrich, meanwhile, manages to defeat the Kolossus, but its corpse falls on Ulrich, devirtualizing him instantly. However, a problem arises: the energy requirements are too great. Aelita's nightmare is realized when Franz makes the ultimate sacrifice to power up the program, and in doing so XANA is wiped out completely as are all of the replikas. Though a great victory for them, the tragic demise of Franz Hopper leaves them with little reason to celebrate.
97	30	"Echoes" "Souvenirs"	2007 (online)	November 10, 2007	430
With their mission completed, the group looks back on all their fond memories of Lyoko. Sissi, meanwhile, plants a tracking device on Ulrich in order to discover their secret. When it comes time to shut down the Supercomputer, all but Yumi are unwilling to go through with it: Aelita is still holding onto the hope that her father can somehow be saved, Jeremy does not want to take away the thing which made them friends, and Odd and Ulrich both liked being heroes. While they muse over their fond attachments to Lyoko, Sissi finds her way into the computer lab and Jeremy's open video diary reveals the whole of their adventures they've been having for the past two years since they started attending Kadic. When Sissi desperately tries to explain this to her father, he dismisses her rants as a nervous breakdown and sends her to the infirmary. A final return to the past deals with that problem. Ulrich stops Sissi from planting the tracker on the repeat attempt, and the quintet invites her as a friend. Once more at the Supercomputer, the group unanimously decides to shut it down to prevent anyone else discovering their secret, closing the book on their adventures. As they sneak back onto school grounds, the group is caught by Jim; he chastises them about needing to be more mature like adults. Odd sarcastically says, "you're an adult, Jim?" to which Jim responds with his signature, "I'd rather not talk about it," before smiling. The series ends by showing the now-deactivated Supercomputer as a brief flash of light is seen behind the sealed core followed by a montage of the Lyoko Warriors individually waving goodbye to the viewer, ending with one last shot of the group standing together in the Desert Region.

== See also ==
- List of Code Lyoko: Evolution episodes
