= Wombat City =

- Genre: Animation
- Created by: Bruno Chane-Kane
- Voices of: Philippe Allard; Nicolas Dubois; Francine Laffineuse; Yann Pichon; Carole Baillien; Nessym Guetat; Alice Ley; Erico Salamone
- Country of origin: France
- Original language: French
- No. of seasons: 2
- No. of episodes: 52

Production
- Running time: 13 minutes
- Production companies: Les Films de la Perrine; Carrere Group; France 2; Benchmark Entertainment

Original release
- Network: France 2
- Release: 29 October 2001

Wombat City is a French animated series produced by Les Films de la Perrine, Carrere Group D.A., France 2, and Benchwork Animations. The series debuted on October 29, 2001 on France 2. 52 13-minute episodes were produced.

== Premise ==
In a vast, futuristic city where people go around in flying cars, there are the Wombat Kids, six children with very different personalities, Wood is the rebel of the group, with a gangster personality, his stepsister BB Doll, the strong-willed girl who always writes about her thoughts in her diary, their very greedy cousin Charmy. There's also Jimy, who is in love with BB Doll but is very clumsy when it comes to showing his feelings, Greg, the philosopher type of the group who always protests by doing a handstand, and Sharon, BB Doll's best friend.

== Episodes ==
1. The Right Path
2. The Spirit of Sport
3. Odd Jobs
4. Communication Breakdown
5. Getting Up and Seducing
6. Global Inequality
7. BB Doll and Existential Anguish
8. Mussels and Fries and Contradiction
9. Life and Top
10. Nightclubbing
11. Canine Dream
12. Merry Christmas
13. Fashion Victim
14. For Better or For Worse
15. Junk Food and The Obsession With Appearance
16. The Reintegration of K-gools
17. Cross-culture
18. Theater
19. Commute, Work, Sleep
20. The Otakus
21. Media Syndrome
22. World Wide Web
23. Musical Influences
24. The Role of the Father
25. Under the Cobblestones
26. Uptown Hip Hop Blues

== Production ==
In 2001, it was announced that a new series from Carrere Group D.A. and Les Films de la Perrine would be airing titled "Wombat City", being planned for 26 13-minute episodes.

Later that year, it would also be announced that a second season was in development, with merchandise also being handled by the VIP.
