= Code Lyoko: Fall of X.A.N.A. =

2008 video game

- Developer(s): Neko Entertainment
- Publisher(s): The Game Factory
- Composer(s): Raphaël Gesqua
- Series: Code Lyoko
- Platform(s): Nintendo DS
- Release: EU: June 6, 2008; NA: June 20, 2008
- Genre(s): Role-playing
- Mode(s): Single-player; Multiplayer

Code Lyoko: Fall of X.A.N.A. (French: Code Lyoko: X.A.N.A. Destruction Finale) is the third video game based on the animated television series Code Lyoko, published by The Game Factory and released in June 2008.

== Premise ==
In line with the plot of the same series, William is under XANA's control and being forced to fight against his will. Like its predecessor, the game vaguely follows the plot of Season 4, although it is comparatively shorter. The game starts off with the heroes already knowing what Replikas are, and they start to hunt their supercomputers down. Unlike Code Lyoko: Quest for Infinity, Jeremy mentions that there are hundreds of Replikas. Another differentiation is that the Kolossus appears; its position is the final boss of the game.

== Gameplay ==
The four warriors battle the Kolossus.

Unlike the previous two games, Code Lyoko: Fall of X.A.N.A. uses an RPG-style interface that combines turn-based and real-time combat. The game also has a multiplayer mode, wherein players can face each other in various forms of battle.

== Reception ==
Reception

Aggregate score
Aggregator	Score
Metacritic	51/100

Review scores
Publication	Score
GameSpot	4.5/10
GameZone	6.5/10
IGN	5.5/10

Fall of X.A.N.A. received "mixed" reviews according to the review aggregation website Metacritic.

== See also ==
- Code Lyoko (video game)
- Code Lyoko: Quest for Infinity
