= Code Lyoko (video game) =

2007 video game

- Developer(s): DC Studios
- Publisher(s): The Game Factory
- Platform(s): Nintendo DS
- Release: NA: May 15, 2007; EU: November 23, 2007; AU: November 29, 2007
- Genre(s): Action, Role-playing
- Mode(s): Single player

Code Lyoko (full title: Code Lyoko: Get Ready to Virtualize; sometimes mislabeled as Code Lyoko: Quest for Infinity) is the first video game based on the French animated television series Code Lyoko, published by The Game Factory and released in 2007.

== Plot ==
The game follows the same story as its corresponding series. Four ordinary high school students, Jeremie Belpois, Odd Della Robbia, Ulrich Stern, and Yumi Ishiyama, must help a virtual humanoid named Aelita to stop the evil artificial intelligence XANA from attacking Earth by traveling to the virtual world, Lyoko. It is mainly based on the first and second seasons, with minor twists. The last chapter in the game features a glimpse of the third season's premiere episode, but with a lot of changes.

== Gameplay ==
A screenshot of a 3D part of the Code Lyoko video game.

The game features both side-scrolling and 3D gameplay, reflecting the two animation styles of the series. In the real world, side-scrolling gameplay is used, resembling that used in traditional role-playing games.

On Lyoko, gameplay consists of third-person fighting, utilizing the special abilities of each character to defeat monsters and solve puzzles. There are a total of 15 chapters, divided into various side-scrolling or 3D levels.

== Reception ==
Reception

Aggregate score
Aggregator	Score
Metacritic	63/100

Review scores
Publication	Score
GameSpot	6/10
GameZone	7/10
IGN	6.5/10
Nintendo Power	7/10

Code Lyoko received "mixed" reviews according to the review aggregation website Metacritic. The game was praised for its accuracy to the show and detailed graphics, while being criticized for its poor combat feature and overall game repetition.

== See also ==
- Code Lyoko: Quest for Infinity
- Code Lyoko: Fall of X.A.N.A.
