= Code Lyoko: Quest for Infinity =

2007 video game

- North American Wii cover art
- Developer: Neko Entertainment
- Publisher: The Game Factory
- Composer: Raphaël Gesqua
- Series: Code Lyoko
- Platforms: Wii; PlayStation Portable; PlayStation 2
- Release: Wii: NA: November 20, 2007; AU: November 22, 2007; EU: November 23, 2007; PlayStation 2, PSP: NA: July 21, 2008; EU: September 26, 2008
- Genres: Action-adventure, platform, role-playing
- Mode: Single-player

Code Lyoko: Quest for Infinity (French: Code Lyoko: Plongez vers l'infini) is a 2007 video game for the Wii console based on the animated television series Code Lyoko. It is the second game based on the French animated television series Code Lyoko. PlayStation 2 and PlayStation Portable ports of the game were released in 2008.

It is the only Code Lyoko video game released on home consoles, as well as the only game for the Sony consoles.

== Plot ==
The game loosely follows Season 4 of the original series. After finishing the Skidbladnir in Carthage, the Lyoko Warriors set off to explore the Digital Sea. They discover numerous Replikas, in which they first use Code: Chimera to destroy them. After discovering that the Replikas are connected to supercomputers on Earth, Jeremie creates a process where the gang can transform into specters on Earth and keep their powers. This is later on used to destroy the five supercomputers. At the end of the game, Aelita and Odd destroy the Volcano Replika's supercomputer and rescue William from XANA's clutches.

== Gameplay ==
Fighting gameplay in the Desert Sector on the PlayStation Portable.

The characters are controlled through various motions with the Wii Remote: slashing controls Ulrich's sword, aiming Odd's arrows by pointing with the Wii Remote, Yumi's balance on narrow walkways is maintained by tilting the controller, and both the Wii Remote and the Nunchuk are used in conjunction to make Aelita fly. The game features locations not seen in the show, including the volcano sector. Unlike the previous game, the player is able to change characters whenever desired.

== Reception ==
Reception

Aggregate scores
Aggregator	Score		
Aggregator	PS2	PSP	Wii
GameRankings	N/A	N/A	58.75%
Metacritic	51/100	55/100	58/100

Review scores
Publication	Score		
Publication	PS2	PSP	Wii
GamesMaster	N/A	N/A	42%
GameZone	N/A	N/A	5/10
IGN	4.8/10	4.8/10	5.5/10
NGamer	N/A	N/A	58%
Nintendo World Report	N/A	N/A	6.5/10
PALGN	N/A	N/A	5.5/10

Code Lyoko: Quest for Infinity received "mixed" reviews on all platforms according to the review aggregation website Metacritic.
