= Code Lyoko =

French animated television series

- Genre: Action; Adventure; Cyberpunk; Science fiction
- Created by: Tania Palumbo; Thomas Romain
- Written by: Sophie Decroisette (seasons 1-3); Bruno Regeste (season 4)
- Directed by: Jérôme Mouscadet
- Voices of: Raphaëlle Lubansu; Sophie Landresse; Géraldine Frippiat; Marie-Line Landerwijn; Mathieu Moreau; Carole Baillien; Arnaud Léonard; Nathalie Stas; Julie Basecqz
- Theme music composer: Justine Sainte (Note: Formerly known as Franck Keller.); Ygal Amar
- Opening theme: "Un monde sans danger" ("A World Without Danger") by Julien Lamassonne (French); Noam Kaniel (English)
- Ending theme: "Un monde sans danger" ("A World Without Danger") (Instrumental) (season 1); "Break Away" (Instrumental) by Subdigitals (seasons 2–4)
- Composers: Serge Tavitian; Herman Martin
- Country of origin: France
- Original language: French
- No. of seasons: 4
- No. of episodes: 97 (Note: Includes the two-part prequel titled "XANA Awakens".) (list of episodes)

Production
- Executive producers: Christophe di Sabatino; Benoît di Sabatino; Nicolas Atlan (seasons 2–4)
- Producers: Nicolas Atlan (season 1); Joanna Ruer (season 1)
- Production locations: Paris, France Boulogne-Billancourt
- Running time: 26 minutes
- Production company: MoonScoop (Note: Known as Antefilms Production for the first season)

Original release
- Network: France 3/Canal J (France)
- Release: 3 September 2003 – 10 November 2007
- Network: Cartoon Network (U.S.) (Note: 89 episodes were broadcast on Cartoon Network. Eight episodes from season 4 were skipped from broadcast, with the 13th episode "Lab Rat" left unaired and the final seven episodes being released online on Cartoon Network Video.)
- Release: 19 April 2004 – 17 November 2007

Code Lyoko (French pronunciation: [kɔd ljɔko]; stylized as CODE: LYOKO in season 1 and in all caps in seasons 2–4) is a French animated series created by Thomas Romain and Tania Palumbo and produced by MoonScoop for Cartoon Network, France 3 and Canal J, with the participation of Conseil Général de la Charente, Pôle Image Magelis, Région Poitou-Charentes, and Wallimage. The series centers around a group of teenagers who travel to the virtual world of Lyoko to battle against X.A.N.A., a hostile artificial intelligence which seeks to attack the real world. The scenes in the real world employ traditional animation with hand-painted backgrounds, while the scenes in Lyoko are presented in 3D CGI animation. The series began its first 97-episode run on September 3, 2003, on France's France 3, and ended on November 10, 2007, and on Cartoon Network in the United States on April 19, 2004, and ended in 2008 after its final seven episodes aired online at Cartoon Network video.

A follow-up non-canon series, Code Lyoko: Evolution, which used live action footage rather than hand-drawn animation to represent the real world, began airing in 2012. The series only consisted of one season of 26 episodes with the final episode airing in late 2013, leaving off on a cliffhanger with no second season or other sequel series planned due to MoonScoop's filing for bankruptcy shortly after in 2014.

In June 2026, it was announced that a sequel series was in development, which will be a direct continuation of the events of Season 4, with the entire original cast and writers returning.

== Plot ==
Jeremy Belpois, an 8th grade prodigy attending boarding school at Kadic Academy, discovers a quantum supercomputer in an abandoned factory near the school. Upon activating it, he discovers a virtual world called Lyoko, consisting of four separate environments known as "sectors" and inhabited by an artificially intelligent girl named Aelita. He also learns of X.A.N.A., a fully autonomous, malevolent, and highly intelligent multi-agent system that also dwells within the Supercomputer. Using structures on Lyoko known as Towers to gain access to the real world, X.A.N.A. can possess electronics, living beings, and other targets like a virus to wreak havoc. X.A.N.A. is determined to eliminate anyone aware of the Supercomputer's existence to achieve freedom to conquer Earth and destroy humanity.

In Season 1, Jeremy works to materialize Aelita into the real world and stop attacks caused by X.A.N.A. He is aided by his three friends, Odd Della Robbia, Ulrich Stern, and Yumi Ishiyama, collectively known as the Lyoko Warriors, whom he virtualizes into Lyoko through devices known as scanners. They achieve this by escorting Aelita to various Towers on Lyoko while under attack from hostile, X.A.N.A.-controlled programs known as monsters. Once a Tower is deactivated by Aelita, Jeremy can launch the "Return to the Past" program, which sends the world back in time and undoes damage caused by X.A.N.A., though anyone scanned into the Supercomputer retains their memory of the events. In the episode "Code: Earth," Aelita is finally materialized, but the group discovers that X.A.N.A. had planted a virus inside of her which will kill her if the Supercomputer is turned off. They realize that they cannot destroy X.A.N.A. without destroying Aelita in the process.

In Season 2, Aelita adjusts to life in the real world, under the name Aelita Stones, while Jeremy attempts to develop an antivirus program to free her from X.A.N.A.'s influence. On Lyoko, a fifth sector is discovered and the group explores more of Lyoko's secrets and mysteries. They begin to uncover information about a mysterious man named Franz Hopper, the supposed creator of the Supercomputer, Lyoko, and X.A.N.A. who went missing ten years ago. It is eventually discovered that Hopper is alive, but went into hiding in the uncharted parts of Lyoko to avoid X.A.N.A. Meanwhile, X.A.N.A. attempts to steal the Keys to Lyoko, lines of code which it can use to escape from the confines of the Supercomputer into the internet, from Aelita's memory. At the end of the season, the group discovers that Aelita is actually human and the biological daughter of Hopper, and, rather than being infected with a virus, is instead missing a fragment of herself. In "The Key," X.A.N.A. tricks them with an imposter, succeeding in stealing Aelita's memory and escaping the Supercomputer. Aelita appears to perish as a result, but is revived when Hopper restores her along with her missing fragment: the memories of her life on Earth before she was virtualized on Lyoko. We still never get any information on Aelita's mother, we don't ever really figure out whether or not she's even alive.

In Season 3, X.A.N.A., no longer bound to the Supercomputer, seeks to destroy Lyoko by erasing its four surface sectors until only Sector Five remains. Initially reluctant, the Lyoko Warriors decide to invite fellow Kadic student William Dunbar as the sixth member. Shortly after being virtualized, however, he is possessed by X.A.N.A. and proceeds to destroy the Core of Lyoko, destroying the virtual world and rendering the group unable to fight X.A.N.A., endangering the real world. After what they thought was their defeat, Jeremy receives a coded message from Hopper containing knowledge necessary for rebuilding Lyoko.

In Season 4, Jeremy and Aelita finish reconstructing Lyoko and construct a digital submarine known as the Skidbladnir to travel across the Digital Sea and destroy X.A.N.A.'s "Replikas," copies of Lyoko's sectors linked to X.A.N.A.-controlled supercomputers on Earth that were created for its goal of world domination. Throughout the season, X.A.N.A. uses William as a weapon to defend the Replikas and target the Lyoko Warriors. To prevent suspicion regarding William's disappearance, Jeremy manages to program a specter to take William's place at Kadic, although its seemingly unintelligent behavior confuses teachers and students alike. Near the end of the season, X.A.N.A. decides to draw energy from its Replikas to create the Kolossus, a gigantic monster which later destroys the Skidbladnir. Thanks to Jeremy's efforts, William is freed from X.A.N.A.'s control, but struggles to regain the group's trust. While Ulrich defeats the Kolossus, Hopper sacrifices himself to power Jeremy's "anti-X.A.N.A. program," which destroys X.A.N.A. forever upon activation. Shortly after, the group, albeit reluctant due to their nostalgia, decides to shut down the Supercomputer.

== Characters ==
=== Lyoko Warriors ===
- Jeremy Belpois

Voiced by: Raphaëlle Bruneau (French); Sharon Mann (English)
A prodigy student who finds and starts up the factory's Supercomputer while looking for parts to build a robot. In doing so, he reawakened Aelita, the virtual world of Lyoko, and the malevolent multi-agent system X.A.N.A. His goals are mainly driven by his desire to protect Aelita, whom he has a crush on, and save her from the Supercomputer and X.A.N.A. by materializing her on Earth. As part of the group, he specializes in programming new ways to defeat X.A.N.A. and monitors the group while they are on Lyoko. Because he is not very athletic and more computer savvy, Jeremy almost never goes to Lyoko, only going there twice and vowing to never go there afterwards. His workaholic attitude occasionally puts a strain on his relationships with the other four members of the group, who frequently refer to him as "Einstein". Once the Tower has been deactivated by Aelita, Jeremy will launch a "Return to the Past" to undo the damages caused by X.A.N.A.

- Aelita Schaeffer

Voiced by: Sophie Landresse (French); Sharon Mann (English)
Mainly known by her alias Aelita Stones, she is the smartest of the group alongside Jeremy. At the beginning of the series, she was trapped within Lyoko inside the Supercomputer. She was originally thought to be an AI until it was revealed that she is the daughter of Franz Hopper, the creator of the world of Lyoko. When she was young, she lost her mother and a group of suited men implied to be government agents came to her home, causing her and Franz to flee and virtualize themselves on Lyoko. Between the virtualization and Jeremy's discovery of the Supercomputer, X.A.N.A. stole an important memory fragment that inhibited her from becoming fully human again. After this fragment is retrieved, she is no longer linked to the Supercomputer and becomes human again, but often has nightmares of her past life. She later enrolls as a boarder at Kadic under the alias Aelita Stones, claiming to be Odd's cousin. She reciprocates Jeremy's feelings for her, but he often strains their relationship by overlooking Aelita and her passions in favor of working on the Supercomputer. She is nicknamed "Princess" by her friends. Aelita is the only one capable of deactivating Towers on Lyoko to completely neutralize X.A.N.A.'s attacks. On Lyoko, she has an elf-like appearance similar to that of "Mr. Pück," a toy elf from her forgotten childhood. She has the ability to create or remove objects, such as rocks or bridges, from the virtual environment, which is called "creativity" by Jeremie. She had no weapons or offensive abilities until season 3, when she developed the ability to create "energy fields," pink balls of plasma that can be thrown or used to block enemy fire from a distance. In the fourth season, Jeremy programmed light pink-white angel wings as part of her new virtual attire, allowing her to fly and carry one person; the star-shaped bracelet she wears allows her to activate them by waving her hand over it.

- Odd Della Robbia

Voiced by: Raphaëlle Bruneau (French); Christophe Caballero and Matthew Géczy (English)
The comic relief of the group. Odd has great academic potential, but rarely uses it; as a result, he gets bad grades due to his lack of studying. Despite his rebellious and impulsive persona, he is shown to be nice. He shares a dorm with Ulrich and has a dog named Kiwi, whom he hides in a dresser because pets are not allowed at Kadic Academy. He is considered a ladies' man and has dated many girls at his school, though these romances are short-lived. Prior to attending Kadic, he lived with his parents and his five older sisters. Odd's blond hair has a purple spot in the middle and, since he was virtualized on Lyoko for the first time, worn up in a spike. He is implied to be of Italian descent, and speaks the language fluently. On Lyoko, he is dressed like a cat, with a tail and clawed gloves that shoot "laser arrows." In the first season, he had a precognitive ability he called "Future Flash", but it was deleted before the second season and replaced by the defensive ability to create a purple force-field by crossing his arms in front of his body. Other abilities include the ability to use his claws to climb on walls like a cat and control monsters upon contact.

- Ulrich Stern

Voiced by: Marie-Line Landerwijn (French); Barbara Weber-Scaff (English)
A more reserved member of the group, Ulrich struggles to share his feelings and learn in order to live up to his parents' expectations, as they pressure him to achieve well in school. In his off-time, he practices Pencak silat with Yumi, whom he has a crush on. He suffers from vertigo, which makes it hard to participate in activities such as rock climbing. Due to his many activities, Ulrich has a rather muscular build, leading many girls, particularly Sissi, to consider him handsome. On Lyoko, he wears a yellow and brown outfit inspired by Japanese samurai. His main weapon is a katana, which he can dual wield. His "Supersprint" ability allows him to dash at high speed, and his "Triplicate" power lets him create two clones of himself. He can combine these abilities in a technique called "Triangulate," using his clones to form a triangle around an enemy and ambush it from behind as it is distracted.

- Yumi Ishiyama

Voiced by: Géraldine Frippiat (French); Mirabelle Kirkland (English)
A fairly reserved student and the oldest of the group, who lives near and attends Kadic and befriends William Dunbar when he transfers to school during season 2. She is of Japanese descent and has a younger brother, Hiroki. At home, she has to deal with marital issues between her parents. She practices pencak silat with Ulrich, whom she has a crush on, though it is not as obvious as his crush on her. Initially, she wears a short black sweater that exposes her midriff, black jeans, and black boots. Her Season 4 outfit is like her sports clothes, consisting of a dark graphite blouse and matching pants with a purple hem, along with black boots. On Lyoko, Yumi is dressed in a geisha-inspired outfit with an obi sash. Her main weapon is a Tessen fan, wielding an additional fan starting in the second season, and her sole power is telekinesis, allowing her to move objects and levitate the Warriors with her mind. This ability is initially rarely used as it tires her out quickly; however, in the fourth season, the ability is used more often, now with more ease and control.

- William Dunbar

Voiced by: Mathieu Moreau (French); David Gasman (English)
An overconfident student who starts attending Kadic Academy after being expelled from his previous school for vandalism. Yumi befriends him and he soon develops feelings for her, often fighting with Ulrich for her attention. He is sometimes disrespectful of Yumi's boundaries, causing her to become frustrated with his unwanted advances. After proving helpful to the group during several X.A.N.A. attacks, they vote on whether he should be allowed to join the group, but Yumi votes no and his memory is erased. Eventually, however, the vote becomes unanimous when William's membership is deemed necessary.
During his first mission on Lyoko, William is captured and possessed by X.A.N.A., who uses him as its puppet. Afterwards, Jeremy creates a clone of William to replace him until he can free him. Jeremy's program is imperfect, causing the William clone to act either unintelligent or unpredictable. He eventually begins to develop human-like traits, which he uses to help the Warriors. Towards the end of the series, William is finally freed from X.A.N.A.'s control in "Down to Earth." On Lyoko, William wears a white outfit and wields a giant sword, which can release shock waves. Under X.A.N.A.'s control, his outfit turns black and he gains a spiked gauntlet on his wrist, which can be used for defense. He has various powers, including enhanced strength, "Supersmoke," which allows him to transform into a cloud of black smoke and move around at great speed, eventually gaining the ability to fly as well, a second sight allowing him to see across great distances, and levitation. X.A.N.A. sends William to stop the Lyoko Warriors on the virtual world, and he proves to be a formidable opponent before he is freed.

=== Villains ===
- X.A.N.A.

X.A.N.A. is an evil, powerful, and ruthless multi-agent system-based AI computer virus who seeks world domination and serves as the main antagonist of the series. Originally created by Franz Hopper to destroy Project Carthage, a military communications system that Hopper had previously been involved with and which he sought to prevent the French government from gaining access to, it evolved and achieved self-awareness due to Hopper's repeated returns to the past. After it betrayed Hopper and trapped him and his daughter Aelita inside Lyoko, Hopper had no choice but to shut down the Supercomputer to stop its rampage. After being reawakened in the present day, X.A.N.A. continues to wreak havoc on Earth and displays no mercy towards those who stand in its way. It grows smarter and more powerful with each return in time and can think of greater plans and goals beyond random destruction. As a digital program, X.A.N.A. has no physical form and is unable to leave the Supercomputer. Instead, it activates Lyoko "Towers" to send manifestations of itself to the real world, which can only be stopped by deactivating the Towers. On Earth, X.A.N.A. appears as a powerful virus that infiltrates networks and can manifest ghostly specters from outlets, which are the closest it has to a physical form to interact with real objects. As a virus, it can control electromagnetic forces and possess systems, inanimate objects, natural elements, or living things and manipulate them to attack humanity and its enemies, with them usually being marked with its eye symbol as a sign of its control. After evolving further, X.A.N.A. learns to possess humans or manifest polymorphic specters to follow its orders, pixelizing and empowering them with its supernatural abilities. On Lyoko, it virtualizes monsters to fight enemies and attack targets, and can alter the environment to its advantage. The only known physical incarnation of X.A.N.A. appeared in season 1, in the episode "Ghost Channel". It disguised itself as Jeremy and, after its disguise was exposed, it transformed into a demonic caricature of Jeremy and tried to kill the Warriors. X.A.N.A.'s voice in the episode was provided by David Gasman. As X.A.N.A.'s power grows, its capabilities with the towers become practically unlimited and its goals develop further. It steals the Keys to Lyoko from Aelita to escape the Supercomputer and access the world network. Upon its escape, X.A.N.A. becomes more ruthless and aggressive, attempting to destroy Lyoko to render the team powerless against it. It succeeds in this goal at the end of the third season, though Lyoko is recreated afterwards. After this, it possesses William to become its minion and targets Franz Hopper, the biggest threat to it and the reason why the group keeps surviving. At the same time, the heroes discover that X.A.N.A. has infected hundreds of supercomputers in the network to build weapons and technology to conquer the real world. Near the end of the series, the group manages to free William and, with Franz Hopper's sacrifice in the final battle, destroyed X.A.N.A. with Jeremy's multi-agent program.

==== The Lyoko Monsters ====
X.A.N.A. virtualizes various types of monsters on Lyoko to fight enemies, guard Towers, and attack targets. The monsters are generally organic/mechanical creatures based on various animals and insects that can be destroyed by hitting the Eye of X.A.N.A. on their bodies, and include Kankrelats (a race of four-legged monsters that became comic reliefs by season 2), Hornets (a race of legless mosquito/hornet-themed monsters), Bloks (a race of four-legged block-headed monsters), Krabs (large crab-themed monsters with scythe-tipped legs), Megatanks (a race of armored sphere monsters that open up to attack), Tarantulas (a race of four-legged giant spider-themed monsters whose legs are tipped with laser cannons), Creepers (a race of monsters with a snake tail instead of legs), and Mantas (a race of flying manta ray-themed monsters).

In the Digital Sea, X.A.N.A. uses monsters such as Kongers (a race of giant eel-themed monsters), Sharks (a race of shark-themed monsters with only one fin on its back), and Kalamar (a race of four-legged squid-themed monsters).

The Scyphozoa is giant jellyfish-themed monster that possesses the ability to levitate, control the minds of others, and drain/steal memory or possess Warriors with its tentacles. It is often seen trying to target Aelita before being repelled by one of the Warriors.

The Kolossus (known as Kolosse in French) is a giant lava monster with a body made of magma rock, it is larger than anything else on Lyoko and possesses immense strength fueled by the combined power of its network Replikas. It wields a giant blade replacing its left hand and is capable of destroying anything in a single hit and causing instant devirtualization. The only way to destroy it was to simultaneously attack the Eye of X.A.N.A. on its head and its left arm. Its function was to devirtualize the Lyoko Warriors and destroy the Skidbladnir. While powerful, its size prevents it from attacking rapidly, and its strength comes at the cost of X.A.N.A. requiring lots of energy to generate it.

Some monsters appear exclusively in the video games, such as Cyberhoppers (a race of one-legged orb-shaped monsters), Skarabs, and the Skorpion (an ostrich/dinosaur-themed monster with a scorpion-like tail) from Get Ready to Virtualize!, and the Insekts (bigger and stronger versions of the Hornets), Volkanoids (a race of two-legged turtle-shelled monsters), Mountain Bug (a more powerful version of the Kankrelats), the Insekt Lord (a larger Insekt), Ice Spider (a race of ice spider-themed monsters), Desert Driller, and Magma Worm in Quest for Infinity and Fall of X.A.N.A..

Other variants are called the "Dark Monsters", which are equipped with different abilities when in combat.

=== Recurring characters ===
- Elisabeth "Sissi" Delmas

Voiced by: Carole Baillien (French); Christine Flowers and Jodi Forrest (English)
The principal's daughter and a Kadic student, who has had a crush on Ulrich since before attending Kadic. Though mean, spoiled, and conceited, she is also beautiful and popular. Sissi and Odd often make fun of each other, with Odd making clever comebacks whenever Sissi says something rude or whenever they need her to go away. After Aelita is first materialized, she often does the same. Sissi tends to make fun of and openly insult Yumi in particular, mostly due to Ulrich liking Yumi more than her. Sissi is often followed by Herb and Nicolas, whom she often shows resentment towards, but uses to her advantage. She was initially part of the gang and knew about Lyoko; however, after she broke her oath to keep the Supercomputer a secret, she was kicked out of the group and her memories of Lyoko were erased. She becomes friends with the Lyoko Warriors at the end of the series. Sissi shows a dislike for being called by her full name, Elisabeth.

- Herb Pichon

Voiced by: Bruno Mullenaerts (French); David Gasman (English)
An eighth-grader at Kadic and a classmate of the Lyoko Warriors. He is the second-in-command of Sissi's gang, and, due to being the most intelligent member of the group, sometimes the boss in times of emergency. Herb is also shown to be in love with Sissi, although he does not tell her because of her crushes on various boys, most notably Ulrich. He is the second-best student in his class after Jeremy and the two often compete with each other, but Herb is almost always the loser. Herb is also shown to be easily scared and quick to run away when trouble happens.

- Nicolas Poliakoff

Voiced by: Carole Baillien (French); Matthew Géczy (English)
An eighth-grader at Kadic and the third member of Sissi's gang. He usually does not show much intelligence and tends to act only when Sissi gives him orders. Nicolas also has been shown to have a crush on Aelita, although he never acts on it. He can play the drums and was in the Pop Rock Progressives, a band started by Odd. He is generally more tolerant of and less rude toward the Lyoko Warriors than Herb and Sissi are. Some episodes show his intelligence, as he wrote a script for a performance of Romeo and Juliet. Nicolas is also shown to be as easily frightened as Herb is.

- Jean-Pierre Delmas

Voiced by: Bruno Mullenaerts (French); Allan Wenger (English)
The principal of Kadic Academy and Sissi's father, who is easily controlled by her. He can be stubborn and ignorant at times, especially when members of the Lyoko Warriors are trying to convince him of dangerous activity caused by X.A.N.A. His appearance is based on Hayao Miyazaki.

- Jim Morales

Voiced by: Frédéric Meaux (French); David Gasman (English)
The gym teacher of Kadic Academy and the chief disciplinarian. He is frequently mentioned to have had an extensive job history, but refuses to talk about it despite often reminiscing on stories of his past, usually before being interrupted by someone or cutting himself off. On several occasions, Jim has discovered the existence of Lyoko or X.A.N.A. and displayed his helpfulness and willingness to keep it a secret; however, his memories are always erased through the use of "Return to the Past." He once starred in a film called Paco, the King of Disco.

- Suzanne Hertz

Voiced by: Nathalie Stas (French); Jodi Forrest (English)
Usually referred to as Mrs. Hertz, she is a science teacher at Kadic. She is the most shown primary academics teacher in the series and the only faculty member shown to organize field trips. She has been shown to dislike or be disappointed in Odd and Ulrich, but takes a liking to Jeremy, and later Aelita. Jim appears to have a crush on her.

- Milly Solovieff and Tamiya Diop

Milly voiced by: Mirabelle Kirkland (English)
Tamiya voiced by: Julie Basecqz (French); Barbara Weber-Scaff (English)
The sole members of the Kadic News crew, who are both are in sixth grade and share a dorm room. Tamiya is of Franco-African descent and seems to be less driven by her emotions than her friend Milly, which allows her to think more clearly in dire situations.

- Hiroki Ishiyama

Voiced by: Guylaine Gibert (French); Barbara Weber-Scaff (English)
Yumi's younger brother. He is often shown pestering her about things and purposely being annoying, such as asking her to do his homework or mentioning her feelings for Ulrich. He is frequently shown playing on a handheld gaming device, and is often shown with his friend, Johnny Cleary. Hiroki has, on occasion, assisted Yumi when she needed it, although usually requires some form of bribe. In "Lost At Sea" it is revealed that Hiroki has a crush on Milly Solovieff.

- Takeho and Akiko Ishiyama

Takeho voiced by: David Gasman (English)
Akiko voiced by: Barbara Weber-Scaff (English)
Yumi and Hiroki's parents. Takeho is shown to be a fairly typical semi-strict busy father and works for a local branch of a Japanese company. Akiko is depicted as a typical non-working housewife and is generally the first one to ask Yumi if something is wrong. When they appear in an episode, it usually focuses on Yumi's family issues. It is implied that Takeho and Akiho have a low-key fractious relationship, with semi-frequent arguments that their children sometimes overhear. This seems to contribute to Yumi's reserve, and possibly her reticence in pursuing a more serious emotional relationship with Ulrich.

=== Supporting characters ===
- Waldo Franz Schaeffer

Voiced by: Mathieu Moreau (French); Paul Bandey (season 2), Alan Wenger (season 4) (English)
More commonly known as Franz Hopper, a combination of his middle name and the maiden name of his wife, he is the creator of Lyoko and X.A.N.A. and was involved in the creation of Project Carthage. After his wife Anthea was kidnapped by men in black suits, he was forced to flee with his daughter Aelita. They came to live at a house called the Hermitage, located in a park near Kadic Academy and the abandoned factory. While working as a science teacher at the school, he constructed the Supercomputer in the factory and programmed X.A.N.A. and the virtual world of Lyoko within it. When the men in black suits tracked him down again, he took Aelita to the factory and virtualized her into Lyoko alongside him, where he believed they would be safe. However, X.A.N.A. refused to obey its creator's orders or live in peace alongside them, and Franz was forced to shut the Supercomputer down until it was eventually discovered by Jeremy nearly ten years later. In one of the final episodes of the show, he sacrifices himself to allow Jeremy to finally destroy X.A.N.A.

- Yolanda Perraudin

Voiced by: Alexandra Correa (French); Jodi Forrest (English)
The school nurse who often treats the students' injuries from any incidents. In "X.A.N.A.'s Kiss," Jim was kissed by a Polymorphic Specter disguised as her and attempted to ask her out on a date, much to her confusion.

- Samantha "Sam" Knight

Voiced by: Jodi Forrest (English)
One of Odd's ex-girlfriends, who appears in two episodes. She first appears in "Rock Bottom?" where Odd hires her as a DJ at Yumi's party, only for X.A.N.A. to cause an earthquake to sink the school. She appears again in "Final Round", where she and Odd enter a skating competition.

- Johnny Cleary

Voiced by: Jodi Forrest (English)
Hiroki's best friend who is introduced in Season 3. It is revealed in "The Pretender" that he has a crush on Yumi despite their age difference; he asks Ulrich for dating advice, but Ulrich also has a crush on her.

- Anthea Hopper-Schaeffer

Voiced by: Sharon Mann (English)
Aelita's mother who was kidnapped by a group of men in black when they lived at a mountain cabin. This traumatized Aelita, who often suffers nightmares and hallucinations of the mysterious men as a pack of ravenous wolves and herself resembling her doll Mister Pück.

== Development ==
2001 original promotional poster for Garage Kids

=== Origins ===
Code Lyoko originates from the film short Les enfants font leur cinéma ("The children make their movies"), directed by Thomas Romain and produced by a group of students from Parisian visual arts school Gobelins School of the Image. Romain worked with Tania Palumbo, Stanislas Brunet, and Jerome Cottray to create the film, which was screened at the 2000 Annecy International Animated Film Festival. French animation company Antefilms took interest in the film due to its atmosphere and offered Romain and Palumbo a contract to turn it into a series. This led to the development of the pilot, Garage Kids.

Garage Kids was produced in 2001 by Antefilms. The project was created by Palumbo, Romain, and Carlo de Boutiny and developed by Anne de Galard. Its producers were Eric Garnet, Nicolas Atlan, Benoît di Sabatino, and Christophe di Sabatino.

Similar to its succeeding show Code Lyoko, Garage Kids was originally envisioned as a 26-episode miniseries detailing the lives of four French boarding school students who discover the secret of the virtual world of Xanadu; created by a research group headed by a character known as the "Professor". The pilot featured both traditional animation and CGI. The Matrix had "enormous influence" on the pilot according to Romain, citing the concept of a machine allowing the characters to dive in a virtual world, an operator who supervises the trip and the correlation between the action in the real world and the virtual world. Anime also served as inspiration, specifically Serial Experiments Lain for its "worrying digital dimension" and Neon Genesis Evangelion for its dangerous entities to fight. While similarities to Tron have been noted, Romain admitted to not having seen the film yet when the series was being developed.

When the concept on the virtual world was added, Antefilms suggested animating it with CGI to help make the series unique, promote a video game theme and make the separation between the virtual and real worlds clearer. While incorporating it, Palumbo and Romain wanted to avoid making the series "too playful and superficial" and sought to "get around the censoring done by TV channels that tend to soften youth programs" by writing episodes "with tension, suspense, even tragic scenes. Things that are hard to imagine seeing in a cartoon series for kids."

A team of artists were recruited in order to give the backgrounds of the real world a realistic appearance. The factory and boarding schools specifically were modelled after locations in France. The factory was based on a Renault production plant in Boulogne-Billancourt (Île Seguin), which has since been demolished. The school, Kadic Academy, is based on Lycée Lakanal in Sceaux, which Romain had attended. Palumbo and Romain were adamant on keeping the locales based on "the France we knew", as they wanted to avoid what they perceived as "fantastical" or "Americanized" locations other French cartoons used at the time.

Scripting for the series officially began in January 2002, with Frédéric Lenoir, Françoise Charpiat, and Laurent Turner being brought on as writers. It was around then when Aelita was added, who at this point was an AI who lived on the virtual world. When choosing a director, the team wanted "a new generation" to be in charge of the series. Jérôme Mouscadet was hired in June 2002 after having dinner with a friend who worked at Antefilms. While Mouscadet had experience with animation from directing short films at a small company, he never directed a series before. One of his first major contributions was to drop the idea of the characters retaining their powers in the real world, which he decided after wanting to further separate the virtual world from the real world. Progress was slow over the summer of 2002, which Mouscadet attributed to the series' head writer "[taking] a lot of vacation". Antefilms reached out to Sophie Decroisette as a replacement, who had recently been a writer for Malo Korrigan and was on a break after giving birth to her first child. Decroisette described this stage of writing as expanding the concept and finding strong motivations for the characters. On Garage Kids' pilot, she said: "I really just saw a teaser that was focusing on images[. T]here were great ideas in the images, notably the transition from one universe to the other, but plot-wise, it was just "they travel from one universe to the other", with no explanation on "how" and "why". They had no real motivation, they were fighting X.A.N.A., which was represented as black spheres, something like this, but none of this was clearly defined. Our job, with the other writers, was to try to introduce "scientific accuracy"". The writers struggled the most with finding a motivation for Jeremy. Charpiat suggested during a meeting that he want to bring Aelita onto Earth, which became the basis for the first season. Another concept emerged from Lenoir in the form of a time travel mechanism to explain how X.A.N.A. could cause massive damage to Earth, with other people witnessing the destruction, and have the heroes fix it without people becoming suspicious. This eventually turned into the Supercomputer's "Return to the Past" function.

Networks were hesitant to Garage Kids due to its serial nature, as they feared it would alienate potential viewers who missed the first episodes and they wanted to rerun the series without worrying about episode order. This lead the writing team to shift to a more episodic format. Romain ultimately chose to leave the series after this change in 2003 to work on the French-Japanese anime series Ōban Star-Racers. Tania Palumbo remained on the series through its conclusion as creative director. She designed and named the main characters, with Jeremy being named after one of her and Romain's classmates at Gobelins. The series' human character designs were primarily influenced by Japanese animator Kōji Morimoto's style.

After the series was sold to France 3 and Canal J, producers felt "Garage Kids" was too unclear for a title and requested it be renamed. Palumbo and production manager Anne de Galard ultimately settled on "Code Lyoko", with Lyoko originating from the Japanese word "旅行" (Ryokō) meaning "travel" to further emphasis the dive into the virtual world. The virtual world was subsequently renamed "Lyoko" as well.

=== Writing ===
The writing process for Code Lyoko usually began with the head writer asking the other writers for story pitches. If they liked an idea, it next had to receive approval from the show's director, producers and broadcasters before it could be turned into a 4-page synopsis. After going through the approval process again, it was then expanded into a script and approved one last time to be sent off for production. Writing an episode typically lasted 2–3 weeks, though some took longer if higher-ups were unhappy with the story or it ran into issues. Sophie Decroisette, head writer of Code Lyoko's first three seasons, described Image Problem as "very difficult to write" after its original writer left the show following the synopsis phase, requiring another writer to step in and finish it. The writing team was also mandated by production to approve 4 scripts per month.

Following the success of the first season, the show was able to have more continuous storylines. Decroisette and show director Jérôme Mouscadet wrote the series' backstory during the break between season 1 and 2. Before Romain left the project, the idea of Lyoko being created by a team of researchers had changed to just one: Franz Hopper. However his motivations and identity were never established. Decroisette revealed during production of season 4 that the full backstory would not be told in the show, as she considered it "very complicated... dense and [not] really important to the story."

The show's international success in the United States also affected production. Romance elements were ultimately reduced after season 2 to appease American audiences. Aside from this, Decroisette otherwise noted that she "never felt censored" while working on the series, apart from a self-imposed restriction to write stories appropriate for children. Bruno Regeste became head writer for Code Lyoko's final season after Decroisette stepped down while she was pregnant with her second child, though she continued writing scripts and closely monitored episodes involving Replikas.

=== Animation ===
The series' traditional animation was handled overseas by Animation Services Hong Kong Limited, Fantasia Animation and Welkin Animation also worked on the show's first two seasons. Starting around the third season, a team dedicated to Code Lyoko was formed at Hong Kong Limited's studio, who were managed on-site by two members from Antefilms' Paris office. This change stemmed from Mouscadet's desire for a more consistent animation quality, which he described trying to manage it prior to that point as "a little bit like steering an ocean liner with binoculars". The 3D segments were animated in-house by Antefilm's CGI team at their Angoulême office.

== Episodes ==
Season	Episodes	Originally released	
Season	Episodes	First released	Last released
1	26	September 3, 2003	February 25, 2004
2	26	August 31, 2005	December 9, 2005
3	15	September 9, 2006	October 23, 2006
4	30	May 18, 2007	November 10, 2007

== Telecast and home media ==
The show first premiered on France 3 on 3 September 2003 and ended on 10 November 2007 in France and on Cartoon Network in the U.S. on 19 April 2004. The second season started on 19 September 2005. The two-part X.A.N.A. Awakens prequel aired on 2–3 October 2006, and the third season started a day later on 4 October 2006. The fourth and final season began on 18 May 2007. The final episode aired on Cartoon Network was "Cousins Once Removed", and the remaining seven episodes were released online on Cartoon Network Video. During its run, it was simultaneously both part of its afterschool weekday action animation light-toned programming block, Miguzi from 2004 until 2007 when it was carried over into its rebranded Master Control block. It was also a standalone show on its primetime slot and continued until 2008. The show also aired on Kabillion from 2007 to 2015.

The show also aired in Latin America and Japan on Jetix. In Italy, the show aired on Disney Channel, Rai 2, RaiSat Smash, Rai Gulp and was published on DVD by Delta Pictures under the label 20th Century Fox Home Entertainment. In Canada, the show aired on Radio-Canada.

In January 2011, all four seasons of Code Lyoko were released on iTunes in the U.S. and France by MoonScoop Holdings, although as of May 2019, only seasons 1 and 2 are available and other seasons have been removed. In October 2011, all four seasons were released on Amazon Instant Streaming and on DVD in the U.S., however, these DVDs are now out of print.

All four seasons were made available on Netflix on 6 August 2012, but were removed. The show was eventually returned to Netflix on 1 October 2020 after being taken down following MoonScoop's bankruptcy. Since 2015, all of the English-dubbed episodes (including the prequel X.A.N.A. Awakens) are viewable on YouTube. Since 2019, an upscaled HD version of the series is also available on Amazon Prime Video in the U.S. and the United Kingdom.

== Reception ==
Emily Ashby of Common Sense Media gave the show 4/5 stars, writing: "Kids will like the battles in Lyoko -- each plays out much like a video game", and added: "Strategy and teamwork are themes throughout the series." In a 2020 retrospective of the show for Comic Book Resources, Noah Dominguez wrote: "Whether you're a returning traveler or are only visiting Lyoko for the first time, Code Lyoko still holds up as a unique, easily-accessible gem of the 2000s".

Code Lyoko was voted as the best show by Canal J viewers in France. The series has achieved international fame as well, becoming the #2 show on Cartoon Network's Miguzi block upon its premiere in the United States. It was the block's most popular series in 2005 and Cartoon Network's #3 best performing show overall in 2006. Kabillion had it as #4 in monthly average views in 2010. The show has reached success in Spain as one of Clan TVE's highest-rated shows, on Italy's Rai2 network, and in Finland and the United Kingdom as well. The show also won France's Prix de l'Export 2006 Award for Animation in December 2006.

== Merchandise ==
Several Code Lyoko products have been released, including DVDs, a series of cine-manga by Tokyopop, a series of four novels by Italian publisher Atlantyca Entertainment, apparel, and other accessories. In 2006, Marvel Toys released a line of Code Lyoko toys and action figures.

When the show was about to come to an end in 2007, The Game Factory released three video games based on the show: Code Lyoko and Code Lyoko: Fall of X.A.N.A. for the Nintendo DS, and Code Lyoko: Quest for Infinity for the Wii, PSP, and PlayStation 2. The games were met with mixed to positive reviews from critics despite some criticisms of gameplay. There have been other games released through various mediums, one being Facebook.

A series of Clan TVE festivals in Spain included live stage shows based on Code Lyoko among other things. A game show known as Code Lyoko Challenge was planned to be released in late 2012, but fell through.

=== Novels ===
A series of four chapter books was released by Atlantyca Entertainment and distributed in Italy and other countries. The novels delve deeper into the unanswered questions of the series. Taking place after the end of the series, X.A.N.A. has miraculously survived and returns though weakened and initially missing its memories. X.A.N.A. possesses Eva Skinner, an American girl, and travels to France in order to infiltrate the gang and kill them off. Unaware of their enemy's presence, the group works to find clues about Aelita's past, left by her father Franz Hopper, and confirm whether or not her mother is still alive somewhere, but at the same time, a terrorist group, the Green Phoenix, has become interested in the Supercomputer and intend to use both it and the virtual world of Lyoko for evil purposes.

It was confirmed that the series will never be released officially in English, nor the final two books released in French. However, sometime later, a fan community came together and sought to not only finish the series but translate it into more languages, including English. They have since completed their work and made it available for free download in September 2014.

== See also ==
- List of French animated television series
- List of French television series
- Code Lyoko: Evolution, a spin-off of Code Lyoko that continues after the events of the show
- Tron - Many similarities between Code Lyoko and Tron have been noted
- The Matrix - Served as inspiration
- Neon Genesis Evangelion - Served as inspiration
- Serial Experiments Lain - Served as inspiration
