= Yamada =

Yamada Tarō (山田太郎), the Japanese equivalent of John Smith

Yamada (山田; lit. 'mountain rice field') is the 12th most common Japanese surname.

== Notable people with the surname ==
- Akari Yamada (山田 朱莉; born 1996), Japanese model, actress and idol
- Aki Yamada (山田 明季; born 1992), Japanese field hockey player
- Akihiro Yamada (山田 章博; born 1957), Japanese illustrator and manga artist
- Akihito Yamada (山田 章仁; born 1985), Japanese rugby union player
- Akira Yamada (山田 晶; 1922–2008), Japanese philosopher
- Yamada Akiyoshi (山田 顕義; 1844–1892), Japanese politician and samurai
- Amy Yamada (山田 詠美; born 1959), Japanese writer
- Anna Yamada (山田 杏奈; born 2001), Japanese actress
- Arinobu Yamada (山田 有信; 1544–1609), Japanese samurai
- Ayano Yamada (山田 綾乃; born 1990), Japanese beauty pageant winner
- Bimyo Yamada (山田 美妙; 1868–1910), Japanese writer
- Chiaki Yamada (山田 千愛; born 1966), Japanese women's footballer
- Daiji Yamada (山田 大治; born 1981), Japanese basketball player
- Eizo Yamada (山田 栄三; 1889–1950), Japanese general
- Eri Yamada (山田 恵里; born 1984), Japanese softball player
- Etai Yamada (山田 恵諦; 1900–1999), Japanese Mahayana Buddhist
- Fernando Yamada (born 1979), Brazilian footballer
- Fushigi Yamada (山田 ふしぎ; born 1959), Japanese voice actress
- Futaro Yamada (山田 風太郎; 1922–2001), pen name of Seiya Yamada, Japanese writer
- Genki Yamada (山田 元気; born 1994), Japanese footballer
- Ginzo Yamada (山田 銀蔵; 1915–?), Japanese cross-country skier
- Goro Yamada (山田 午郎; 1894–1958), Japanese footballer and manager
- Hideaki Yamada (山田 秀明; born 1960), Japanese cross-country skier
- Hidetaka Yamada (山田 英孝; born 1976), Japanese badminton player
- Hikohachi Yamada (山田彦八; 1855–1942), Japanese admiral
- Hiroki Yamada (disambiguation), multiple people
- Hiromi Yamada (山田 宏巳; born 1953), Japanese chef
- Hiroomi Yamada (山田 宏臣; 1942–1981), Japanese long jumper
- Hiroshi Yamada (山田 宏; born 1958), Japanese politician
- Hiroto Yamada (山田 寛人; born 2000), Japanese footballer
- Hisao Yamada (山田 尚勇; 1930–2008), Japanese computer scientist
- Hisashi Yamada (山田 久志; born 1948), Japanese baseball player
- Ippo Yamada (山田 一法), Japanese video game composer
- Isamu Yamada (山田 勇; 1932–2007), better known as Knock Yokoyama, Japanese comedian and politician
- Isao Yamada (山田 勇男; born 1952), Japanese film director
- Isuzu Yamada (山田 五十鈴; 1917–2012), Japanese actress
- Itsuki Yamada (山田 樹; born 1990), Japanese footballer
- Jirokichi Yamada (山田 次朗吉; 1863–1930), Japanese swordsman
- J-ta Yamada (山田 J太), Japanese manga artist
- Jundai Yamada (山田 純大; born 1973), Japanese actor
- Kagari Yamada (山田 かがり; born 1972), Japanese women's basketball player
- Kanematsu Yamada (山田 兼松; 1903–1977), Japanese long-distance runner
- Kazuki Yamada (山田 和樹; born 1979), Japanese conductor
- Kazuo Yamada (山田 一雄; 1912–1991), Japanese classical composer and conductor
- Kazushi Yamada (山田 和司; born 1987), Japanese badminton player
- Kazuya Yamada (山田和哉; born 2001), Japanese speed skater
- Keaton Yamada (キートン 山田; born 1945), Japanese voice actor
- Keiichi Yamada (山田 恵一; born 1964), better known as Jushin Liger, Japanese professional wrestler
- Keiji Yamada (山田 啓二; born 1954), Japanese politician
- Keiko Yamada (小室 桂子; born 1972), Japanese singer
- Keiko Yamada (manga artist) (山田 圭子), Japanese manga artist
- Keisuke Yamada (山田 圭介; born 1974), better known as Black Buffalo, Japanese professional wrestler
- Keizo Yamada (山田 敬蔵; 1927–2020), Japanese long-distance runner
- Kenichi Yamada (山田 健一; born 1947), Japanese golfer
- Kenji Yamada (disambiguation), multiple people
- Kenneth Yamada, American biologist
- Kimio Yamada (山田 規三生; born 1972), Japanese Go player
- Kiyoshi Yamada (山田 清志; born 1977), better known as Kiyoshi Hikawa, Japanese enka singer
- Kō Yamada (山田 亘; born 1964), Japanese photographer
- Kohei Yamada (山田 晃平; born 1989), Japanese footballer
- Koji Yamada (山田 浩二), Japanese billiards player
- Yamada Kōrin (山田 弘倫; 1869–1955), Japanese doctor
- Kosaku Yamada (山田 耕筰; 1886–1965), Japanese classical composer and conductor
- Kota Yamada (山田 康太; born 1999), Japanese footballer
- Koun Yamada (山田 耕雲; 1907–1989), Japanese Zen Buddhist
- Kumi Yamada (山田 久美; born 1967), Japanese shogi player
- Kyle Yamada (born 1983), Canadian soccer player
- Lisa Yamada (born 2002), American actress
- Machiko Yamada (山田 満知子; born 1943), Japanese figure skater and coach
- Mai Yamada (山田 麻衣; born 1975), better known as Riona Hazuki, Japanese actress
- Mamoru Yamada (山田 守; 1894–1966), Japanese architect
- Manabu Yamada (山田 学; born 1969), Japanese mixed martial artist
- Mariko Yamada (born 1950), Japanese American politician
- Mariya Yamada (山田 まりや; born 1980), Japanese actress and gravure idol
- Masaaki Yamada (山田 雅章; born 1942), Japanese physicist
- Masaharu Yamada (山田 政晴; born 1980), Japanese weightlifter
- Masahiko Yamada (山田 正彦; born 1942), Japanese politician
- Masahiro Yamada (disambiguation), multiple people
- Masaki Yamada (disambiguation), multiple people
- Masayuki Yamada (山田 将之; born 1994), Japanese footballer
- Matsuichi Yamada (山田 松市; born 1961), Japanese footballer and manager
- Michiyoshi Yamada (山田 道美; 1933–1970), Japanese shogi player
- Miho Yamada (山田 美穂; born 1973), Japanese voice actress
- Miho Yamada (gymnast) (山田 海蜂; born 1973), Japanese rhythmic gymnast
- Miki Yamada (山田 美樹; born 1974), Japanese politician
- Mikiya Yamada (山田 幹也; born 1992), Japanese footballer
- Mitsuo Yamada (山田 満夫; born 1994), Japanese footballer
- Mitsuye Yamada (born 1923), American poet, activist, and professor
- Miyo Yamada (山田 美葉; born 1976), Japanese softball player
- Miyu Yamada (山田 美諭; born 1993), Japanese taekwondo practitioner
- Mumon Yamada (山田 無文; 1900–1988), Japanese calligrapher
- Murasaki Yamada (やまだ 紫; 1948–2009), Japanese manga artist, writer and poet
- Nagamasa Yamada (山田 長政; 1590–1630), Japanese adventurer, governor of a province of the Ayutthaya Kingdom (Thailand)
- Nana Yamada (山田 菜々; born 1992), Japanese idol and singer
- Nanpei Yamada (山田 南平; born 1972), Japanese manga artist
- Naoki Yamada (山田 直輝; born 1990), Japanese footballer
- Naoko Yamada (山田 尚子; born 1984), Japanese animator and film director
- Naoyuki Yamada (山田 尚幸; born 1987), Japanese footballer
- Nichika Yamada (山田 二千華; born 2000), Japanese volleyball player
- Nobuhisa Yamada (山田 暢久; born 1975), Japanese footballer
- Nobuko Yamada (山田 乃玞子; born 1971), Japanese speed skater
- Nobumichi Yamada (山田 信道; 1833–1900), Japanese politician
- Otozō Yamada (山田 乙三; 1881–1965), Japanese general
- Reiji Yamada (山田 玲司; born 1966), Japanese manga artist
- Reirin Yamada (山田 霊林; 1889–1979), Japanese Zen Buddhist
- Riku Yamada (山田 陸; born 1998), Japanese footballer
- Ryosuke Yamada (山田 涼介; born 1993), Japanese singer and actor
- Ryoun Yamada, Japanese Zen Buddhist
- Ryusei Yamada (山田琉聖; born 2006), Japanese snowboarder
- Sachiko Yamada (disambiguation), multiple people
- Sadayoshi Yamada (山田 定義; 1892–1971), Imperial Japanese Navy admiral
- Seiji Yamada (山田 誠司; born 1966), Japanese ski mountaineer
- Seiko Yamada (山田 靑; born 1978), Japanese badminton player
- Sena Yamada (山田 誓己; born 1994), Japanese motorcycle racer
- Setsuo Yamada (山田 節男; 1898–1975), Japanese politician
- Shinnosuke Yamada (山田 真之亮; born 1992), Japanese racing driver
- Shinya Yamada (山田 真矢; born 1970), Japanese musician
- Shintaro Yamada (山田 親太朗; born 1986), Japanese model, actor and singer
- Shintaro Yamada (businessman) (山田 進太郎; born 1977/1978), Japanese businessman
- Shinzo Yamada (山田 伸三; 1914–2000), Japanese cross-country skier
- Shuji Yamada (山田 修司; born 1956), Japanese volleyball player
- Yamada Shunzō (山田 春三; 1846–1921), Japanese politician
- Yamada Sōbi (山田 宗美; 1871–1916), Japanese metallurgic artist
- Sobin Yamada, Japanese Zen Buddhist
- Tachi Yamada (1945–2021), scientist and gastroenterologist
- Taichi Yamada (山田 太一; born 1934), Japanese writer and screenwriter
- Taichi Yamada (rower) (山田 太一; 1917–?), Japanese rower
- Taiki Yamada (山田 大樹; born 2002), Japanese footballer
- Takahiro Yamada (disambiguation), multiple people
- Takayuki Yamada (山田 孝之; born 1983), Japanese actor, singer and producer
- Takeshi Yamada (born 1960), American artist
- Takuji Yamada (山田 拓自; born 1979), Japanese Go player
- Takumi Yamada (山田 拓巳; born 1989), Japanese footballer
- Takuya Yamada (山田 卓也; born 1974), Japanese footballer
- Yamada Tamaru (山田 タマル; born 1982), Japanese singer-songwriter
- Tarzan Yamada (born 1962), Japanese drifting driver
- Tatsuo Yamada (山田 辰夫; born 1956), Japanese actor
- Tatsuo Yamada (karate) (山田 辰雄; 1905–1967), Japanese karateka
- Tetsuto Yamada (山田 哲人; born 1992), Japanese baseball player
- Toshihiko Yamada (山田 敏彦; born 1932), Japanese ice hockey player
- Toshio Yamada (山田 俊男; born 1946), Japanese politician
- Toshiyo Yamada (山田 敏代; born 1970), Japanese professional wrestler
- Utako Yamada (山田 詩子; born 1963), Japanese writer, illustrator and translator
- Waka Yamada (山田 わか; 1879–1957), Japanese feminist
- Wataru Yamada (山田 渉; born 1966), Japanese boxer
- Yoji Yamada (山田 洋次; born 1931), Japanese film director
- Yasuo Yamada (山田 康雄; 1932–1995), Japanese actor and voice actor
- Yoshio Yamada (山田 孝雄; 1873–1958), Japanese linguist
- Yasuhiro Yamada (山田 泰寛; 1968–2013), Japanese footballer
- Yasunori Yamada (山田 靖智), Japanese anime screenwriter
- Yoko Yamada (山田 よう子; born 1979), Japanese mixed martial artist
- Yoshimitsu Yamada (山田 嘉光; born 1938), Japanese aikidoka
- Yu Yamada (山田 優; born 1984), Japanese model, actress and singer
- Yūki Yamada (山田 裕貴; born 1990), Japanese actor
- Yuki Yamada (darts player) (山田 勇樹; born 1983), Japanese darts player
- Yurina Yamada (山田 優梨菜; born 1996), Japanese ski jumper
- Yutaka Yamada (やまだ 豊; born 1989), Japanese composer
- Yuto Yamada (山田 雄士; born 2000), Japanese footballer
- Yuya Yamada (山田 裕也; born 1988), Japanese footballer

== Fictional characters ==
- Yamada (山田), protagonist of the manga series B Gata H Kei
- The Yamadas, characters in the film My Neighbors the Yamadas
- The Yamada Asaemon clan, characters in the manga series Hell's Paradise: Jigokuraku
- Anna Yamada (山田 杏奈), a character in the manga series The Dangers in My Heart
- Aoi Yamada (山田 葵), a character in the manga series Working!!
- Ayumi Yamada (山田 あゆみ), a character in the manga series Honey and Clover
- Chi Yamada, protagonist of the manga series Chi's Sweet Home
- Elf Yamada (山田 エルフ), a character in the light novel series Eromanga Sensei
- Hanako Yamada, a character in the video game Yandere Simulator
- Hanatarō Yamada (山田 花太郎), a character in the manga series Bleach
- Hifumi Yamada (山田 一二三), a character in the visual novel Danganronpa: Trigger Happy Havoc
- Hizashi Yamada (山田 ひざし), a character in the manga series My Hero Academia
- Ichiro Yamada (山田一郎), a character from the multimedia project Hypnosis Mic: Division Rap Battle
- Jiro Yamada (山田二郎), a character from the multimedia project Hypnosis Mic: Division Rap Battle
- Saburo Yamada (山田三郎), a character from the multimedia project Hypnosis Mic: Division Rap Battle
- Jubei Yamada (山田 十平衛), a character in the video game Fatal Fury 2
- Kouji Yamada (山田 光司), a character in the manga series Shaman King
- Maya Yamada (山田 真耶), a character in the light novel series Infinite Stratos
- Miiko Yamada (山田 みい子), protagonist of the manga series Kocchi Muite! Miiko
- Nina Yamada (山田 二菜), protagonist of the manga series Mamotte! Lollipop
- Raizo Yamada (山田 ライゾウ), a character in the anime series Valvrave the Liberator
- Ryō Yamada (山田 リョウ), a character in the anime/manga series Bocchi the Rock!
- Ryuu Yamada (山田 竜), protagonist of the manga series Yamada-kun and the Seven Witches
- Seiji Yamada (山田 征二), a character in the manga series Sensitive Pornograph
- Seina Yamada (山田 西南), a character in the anime series Tenchi Muyo! GXP
- Shintarou Yamada (山田 新太郎), protagonist of the manga series Kanpai!
- Tae Yamada (山田 たえ), a character in the anime series Zombie Land Saga
- Taeko Yamada, a character in the video game Yandere Simulator
- Taro Yamada (山田 太郎), a character in the manga series Dokaben
- Taro Yamada, protagonist of the manga series Yamada Taro Monogatari
- Taro Yamada, a character in the video game Yandere Simulator
- Tsuyoshi Yamada (山田 剛司), a character in the television series Densha Otoko
- Yamao Yamada (山田 ヤマオ), a character in the media franchise Pretty Rhythm
- Yui Yamada (山田 結衣), a character in the manga series Kase-san

== See also ==
- Courtney Yamada-Anderson (born 1980), American skeleton racer
- Japanese name
