= List of Valvrave the Liberator episodes =

Valvrave the Liberator
- Cover of the sixth and final season 2 Blu-ray volume released by Aniplex in Japan on May 28, 2014.
- No. of episodes: 24

Release
- Original network: MBS
- Original release: April 12 – December 26, 2013

Valvrave the Liberator is a 2013 Japanese mecha anime series. The Third Galactic Reich began on the 71st Year of the True Calendar. By this time, almost 70% of the human population, having divided itself into three factions: ARUS, JIOR and Dorssia, had migrated into space following the creation of Dyson Spheres—massive space habitats capable of sustaining human life. This segregation created an ongoing conflict between the hostile Dorssian forces which seek to expand their territory and the allied ARUS and neutral JIOR factions. Subsequently, the JIOR scientists developed a highly advanced weaponized mecha technology called Valvrave which possess enough power to turn the tide of the war. With each of the hostile factions now desiring this weapon, high schoolers, Haruto Tokishima and his friends pilot the Valvrave mechs and use them to protect their Module 77 home from the Dorssian forces.

The anime is produced by Sunrise and chiefly directed by Kō Matsuo with series composition and script supervision by Ichirō Ōkouchi, original character designs by Katsura Hoshino, art direction by Masatoshi Kai, sound direction by Masafumi Mima and soundtrack music by Akira Senju. The series' first and second seasons premiered on MBS on April 12, 2013 and October 10, 2013 respectively. The series received later airings on TBS, CBC, RKB, HBC, BS-TBS and Animax. The series was licensed by Aniplex of America for streaming on Aniplex Channel. Crunchyroll also obtained the series for streaming with English subtitles in North America, United Kingdom, and Ireland. The series was released on home media disc format by Aniplex in Japan, Aniplex of America in North America and by Hanabee Entertainment in Australia and New Zealand.

The anime uses ten pieces of theme music: two opening themes, four ending themes and four insert songs.

== Episode list ==
No.	Title (Note: All English titles are taken from Aniplex of America.)	Directed by	Written by	Original release date (Note: As Valvrave the Liberator premiered in MBS' Thursday 25:35 (01:35 JST) time slot, the episodes technically aired the days following the ones listed.)	English air date	Ref.
Part 1
1	"The Revolutionary Transfer Student"; Transliteration: "Kakumei no Tenkōsei" (Japanese: 革命の転校生)	Kō Matsuo	Ichirō Ōkouchi	April 12, 2013	TBA	
Aboard Module 77 of the JIOR Sphere 01, Haruto Tokishima loses an eating contest to Shōko Sashinami for use of their school grounds while unbeknownst to them, five undercover Dorssian Agents infiltrate Sakimori High School. Sometime later as the agents scout the school for a destination, one of them has a brief altercation with Haruto over their differing worldviews. Afterwards, the Dorssian Agents infiltrate and kill the scientists in a covert lab under the school although a wounded scientist ejects their primary target, a giant mecha called Valvrave 01 to the school's surface. At the same time, Dorssian Commander Cain Dressel launches a squadron of mecha to invade Module 77, which activates the Module's defenses. As the surface turns into a battlefield, Haruto and his friends attempt to flee, although Shōko gets caught in an explosion which presumably kills her, much to Haruto's horror. Overcome with vengeance, Haruto boards the Valvrave 01 which initially fails to start and becomes the target of a Dorssian mecha. However, Haruto soon accepts its start-up question and gets injected with a substance, activating the Valvrave. Taking to the skies, the Valvrave 01 then easily overwhelms and defeats the invading forces. In the aftermath, as Haruto exits the Valvrave, much to the praise of the school and the worldwide live-streaming audience, his grief at Shōko's death overwhelms him. In the epilogue, Dorssian Army Special Forces agent codenamed, L-elf confronts and brutally takes Haruto's life. As L-elf then turns to commandeer the Valvrave, Haruto suddenly appears behind him in a seemingly resurrected inhuman state and bites his neck, triggering an event.
2	"Beyond 666"; Transliteration: "666 o Koete" (Japanese: 666を超えて)	Masato Jinbo	Ichirō Ōkouchi	April 19, 2013	TBA	
Kyūma Inuzuka, Aina Sakurai and Saki Rukino arrive at the Valvrave's location to find an unconscious Haruto and L-elf. As the other Dorssian agents arrive, L-elf seemingly betrays his comrades and helps the students flee. Afterwards, as the Dorssian forces occupy Module 77, Haruto convinces his friends that he had somehow possessed L-elf's body and later retake the Valvrave, while he also managing to return to his own body with help from Saki. As the Valvrave activates and attacks the nearby the Dorssian ship, it finds itself knocked outside of the Module into space. A-drei and Q-vier then use Dorssia Ideal Mechs to attack the Valvrave 01 whilst believing that L-elf betrayed them. Demanding answers from Haruto, L-elf takes Saki hostage, but Haruto ignores him when he unbelievably receives a call from Shōko and learns of her survival. The Valvrave 01 soon overheats but the heat limiter changes from 100 to 666—which L-elf deduces would unlock the Valvrave's true power. Sure enough, as the gauge reaches its limit due to A-drei's onslaught, the Valvrave 01 activates its Harakiri Blade and defeats A-drei's Ideal. Soon after, the Dorssians are repelled by incoming ARUS battleships and Haruto and his friends reunite on Module 77. Finally, Haruto chooses not to confess to Shōko, tearfully believing that the monster he has become has no right to happiness.
3	"L-Elf's Prophecy"; Transliteration: "Eruerufu no Yogen" (Japanese: エルエルフの予言)	Kazuo Miyake	Ichirō Ōkouchi	April 26, 2013	TBA	
The ARUS forces apprehend L-elf while he relays a strange string of words to Haruto. As the ARUS forces along with Senator Figaro provide relief to the students of Sakimori Academy, Haruto and his friends try and fail to deduce the nature of his new abilities. Afterwards, Figaro sends word to meet Haruto and urges him to become a symbol of hope in the war against Dorssia. Meanwhile, as L-elf escapes his captivity, Cain dispatches A-drei, X-eins, H-neun and Q-vier in another attempt to recapture Module 77. At the same time, Haruto starts helping the ARUS soldiers calmly evacuate the Sakimori students by reassuring them of their safety via a loudspeaker. Afterwards, as L-elf causes a wave of destruction during his escape, Raizō Yamada confronts Haruto while checking the school for straggling students and demands use of the Valvrave 01 to avenge his friend Nobu. Just then, L-elf causes the ARUS transport ship to crash into and block the Module's docking bay—essentially trapping all of the Module's occupants. As Haruto feels the earthquake, panic subsequently starts spreading through the students when they learn of their entrapment. Simultaneously looking at the time—3:14, Haruto turns around to find L-elf standing behind him, the latter of whom asks Haruto to help him bring a revolution to Dorssia.
4	"The Hostage is Valvrave"; Transliteration: "Hitojichi wa Varuvureivu" (Japanese: 人質はヴァルヴレイヴ)	Kenji Takahashi	Ichirō Ōkouchi	May 3, 2013	TBA	
President Jeffrey Anderson and the ARUS senate vote on obtaining the JIOR Valvrave weapon to aid in their campaign against Dorssia. Meanwhile after rejecting L-elf's contract, Haruto fails to stop Figaro from experimenting with Unit 01—resulting in the death of an ARUS pilot. The Dorssian fleet then makes an initial strike against Module 77 which prompts Figaro to prioritize his safety over the Sakimori students in a transmission intercepted by Shōko and Akira Renbōkoji. Shōko then uses drastic means to inform the Student Council of Figaro's treachery and while Takahi Ninomiya distracts the ARUS representatives, Shōko, Kyūma and Yūsuke Otamaya rescue Haruto. As Figaro attempts to leave, Haruto then appears and reveals his true intentions to the disbelieving student body. Having lost his patience, Figaro begins firing on the students until Haruto stops him with Unit 01. L-elf then appears within the crowd and shatters their spirit with the truth that the Dorssian forces are laying in wait outside Module 77. However Shōko proposes the idea of blackmailing both the ARUS and Dorssia with the relinquishing of Unit 01. Shōko then rallies the Sakimori students into seceding from JIOR by declaring Module 77 an independent state while the Valvrave 01 severs Module 77's connecting bridges to JIOR 01 and lifts it away from the Sphere.
5	"Sakimori Academy Sings"; Transliteration: "Utau Sakimori Gakuen" (Japanese: 歌う咲森学園)	Tatsuma Minamikawa	Ichirō Ōkouchi	May 10, 2013	TBA	
With their blackmail keeping the ARUS and Dorssian forces at bay, the Sakimori students enjoy an out-of-place peace aboard Module 77 albeit unaware of its dangerously high power consumption. Elsewhere, Dorssian Führer Amadeus K. Dorssia rallies his forces together with a show of power. While exploring the depths of Module 77, L-elf makes a discovery when the electrical grid shuts down due to the overworked weather system. Despite being locked in the Valvrave 01 hangar, Takumi Kibukawa explains the problem with Yūsuke being the only other person to comprehend. Raizō then drags Yūsuke to the heights of the Module to reset the system, eventually finding the switch when the latter falls through the battle-damaged floor. The chilly climate also begins dampening the spirits of the Sakimori girls to the point where Takahi and her clique start assigning blame on Shōko and Saki. As Haruto tries to stop the fighting, the tension immediately eases when Yūsuke successfully restores the Module's power. Afterwards the Sakimori students broadcast a music video over the WIRED network to assure the world of their well-being while also gaining support and international aid in the process. Haruto and Saki later use the Valvrave 01 to start exploring the depths of Module 77, where L-elf guides them to a hangar containing four more Valvrave Units.
6	"Saki's Comeback!"; Transliteration: "Saki Kamubakku" (Japanese: サキカムバック)	Akira Yoshimura	Ichirō Ōkouchi	May 17, 2013	TBA	
Despite Haruto's attempt to stop her, Saki boards the Valvrave Four and to his surprise she successfully completes its start-up procedure. Secretly observing Saki's success at piloting the Valvrave Four, L-elf deduces that the underground facility was not built under Sakimori High by chance since the students meet some requirement to operating the mechs by comparing them to the failed attempt by the ARUS soldier. After a bit of joyriding, Saki laments on her past, causing Haruto to let his guard down and she bites him, switching their consciousness. Afterwards Haruto (Saki) uses Haruto's WIRED account to help boost her own popularity as an idol. When confronted by Haruto, and soon after by Shoko, she claims that if she doesn't assert her status as an idol, everyone will forget about her. At that moment, Module 77 comes under the attack of the Dorssian forces yet again, although this time, surrounding the Module to prevent any incoming aid from ARUS while also destroying the lone ARUS ship, killing Senator Figaro. Much to Sakimori High's surprise and that of the Dorssian forces, Saki intercepts them with the Valvrave Four which she dubs "Carmilla" and is initially able to hold them back, until X-eins has Dorssian forces switch to long range rockets, realizing that the Valvraves are only completely effective at close range. Her inability to react, paralyzes Saki with fear but Haruto shows up with the Valvrave One and draws the rockets away from Saki. Although, after some cheering from her comrades aboard Module 77, Saki regains her resolve and begins live-streaming the battle across the WIRED network to further increase her fame and successfully repels the Dorssian forces. Meanwhile, using the battle as cover, A-drei sneaks aboard Module 77.
7	"Haruto Under the Rubble"; Transliteration: "Garekinoshita no Haruto" (Japanese: 瓦礫の下のハルト)	Shigeru Ueda	Jun Kumagai	May 24, 2013	TBA	
200 years in the future, Saki battles an unknown foe in the green Valvrave, and upon defeating him looks at an old pocket watch and speaks of keeping a promise. Back in the present, while Haruto and Saki had planned on keeping the presence of the additional Valvraves a secret to keep others from being dehumanized, Shoko and other students discover them. This prompts Haruto to publicly inform the students of the Valvraves and conditions to becoming a pilot. While negotiating a treaty with ARUS and Dorssia, L-elf orders the students to undergo mandatory conscription into the new JIOR military. With the students showing overwhelming opposition, L-elf activates the traps he secretly placed in order to pressure the students into agreeing. Some time later, Dorssian forces invade Module 77, and A-drei attacks Haruto. Although, L-elf protects Haruto after telling A-drei that he is a critical part of his plan to liberate Dorssia. They are interrupted by Q-vier, under orders to capture Haruto, but instead uses his mech in an attempt to kill him while subsequently causing a wave of massive destruction in the hangar, killing Aina in the process and critically wounding Haruto. Meanwhile Saki defends Module 77 from X-eins and H-neun along with other Dorssian forces, but gets cornered by their new magnetic weapons. L-elf allows Haruto to possess his body to pilot the Valvrave and successfully repels the Dorssian forces with L-elf's explicit written instructions. After the battle, L-elf (Haruto) finds a photo of a girl inside L-elf's pocket which causes L-elf's body to reflexively manifest an emotional response.
8	"The Princess of Light"; Transliteration: "Hikari no Oujo" (Japanese: 光の王女)	Seung Hui Son	Jun Kumagai	May 31, 2013	TBA	
A flashback during the 61st year of the True Calendar shows a young L-elf attempting to escape from a Dorssian prison camp. Whilst cornered by the guards, he comes across a young girl and threatens her in front of the guards. Back in the present, L-elf awakens having been freed from Haruto's possession and warns that only 6 hours remains until the fall of the new JIOR, whilst still waiting for Haruto's answer to his previous contract. As Saki laments her inability to react during the last battle, Haruto learns from his friends and a distraught Kyuma of Aina's death. Meanwhile, A-drei delivers the results of his reconnaissance to Cain and is issued to lead the next attack on Module 77 in order to retrieve L-elf. As the operation begins, the Dorssians use the attack to distract Haruto and Saki so that A-drei's squad can sneak into Module 77. A-drei's squad quickly take control of the abandoned JIOR battle ships in the harbor and begin firing rockets at Sakimori Academy, offering the students an ultimatum, of deciding whether to surrender as they aim their rockets closer and closer to the school. Meanwhile, Haruto and Saki continue to struggle with Q-vier's magnetic weapons. Seeing no other option, Haruto forms the contract with L-elf in order to save Module 77. L-elf then has Haruto take his Valvrave as well as Saki's immobilized Valvrave to an exact point outside of Module 77 and puncture a hole in Module 77's hull. This causes the seawater to escape into space, and drench both Valvraves. As the water crystallizes, it freezes the metallic boomerangs covering the Valvraves, and allow them to move once more. As an added effect, the draining seawater, disturbs A-drei's squad on the JIOR battleships and hence crush the Dorssians plan. As Haruto waits for his Valvrave to reach maximum heat capacity, L-elf buys him time with a JIOR battle cruiser. Finally, Haruto's Valvrave once again impales its engine and directs the heat attack at the Dorssian battle ships, while L-elf sacrifices his own cruiser. A continuation of L-elf's flashback, shows that the girl whom he had taken hostage, decided to give him "half of her life" through the symbolism of giving him a piece of her hair, thus saving L-elf from the guards. Back in the present, as L-elf floats in space waiting for his air to run out, Haruto comes to his rescue. Meanwhile, Cain looks at A-drei's pictures of an incomplete Valvrave.
9	"Dogs and Thunder"; Transliteration: "Inu to Kaminari" (Japanese: 犬と雷)	Naomichi Yamato	Ichirō Ōkouchi	June 7, 2013	TBA	
L-elf has the students perform military training and establish plans to increase the defenses of Module 77. Meanwhile, Raizo is caught once again trying to hijack one of the Valvraves and is put into prison, while Kyuma dedicates himself to training in order to avenge Aina's death. Soon after, Module 77 is once again under Dorssian attack. Haruto and Saki engage the enemies unaware that they are being drawn away from the base and giving an opening for a second invading force. With Haruto and Saki occupied fighting A-Drei's party, a shortage of power renders the module defenseless until Kyuma takes control of the blue Valvrave and starts a counterattack. However, Kyuma finds himself in a disadvantage until the yellow Valvrave, piloted by Raizo, appears to assist him and they manage to drive away the enemies. After the battle, Haruto confronts L-elf as he did not warn them about the enemy's strategy, but he is calmed down by Kyuma who claims that he chose becoming a Valvrave pilot by his own will just like Raizo. Sometime later, Takumi is confronted by L-elf and confesses that except by Rion, all teachers and personnel in Module 77 were part of the military and involved with the Valvrave project and unbeknownst to them, the students were also part of it.
10	"Campaign Promise of Love"; Transliteration: "Koi no Senkyo Kōyaku" (Japanese: 恋の選挙公約)	Masato Jinbo	Ichirō Ōkouchi	June 14, 2013	TBA	
Takumi explains to L-elf that Sakimori High School was created as part of Project VVV—a JIOR military initiative. Elsewhere, Haruto and co. discuss the terms of keeping their possession ability a secret. At the same time, Rion announces that Module 77 will hold elections for a new Prime Minister to handle their public affairs once they get to the moon and L-elf volunteers to take care of the election affairs since having an appointed leader would help meet his goals. Later on, Haruto starts losing control of himself to the foreign gene more frequently and Saki opts to kill him should he harm their fellow students. At the same time, Shōko uncharacteristically refuses to run in the election despite pressuring from her schoolmates. Meanwhile, Cain plans to intercept Module 77 before they reach the neutral grounds of the moon. Haruto later beats himself up for not realizing that Shōko already knew that her father might be dead and vows to find him and end her pain. This gives Shōko resolve to enter the election and she easily sways the popular vote by proposing a cultural festival upon reaching the moon. Simultaneously, as Saki tries to talk Haruto out of his decision, he suddenly loses control of his body and rapes her, with Saki finally realizing the curse of the Valvrave power. Afterwards, when Haruto awakens in a horrified state, Saki informs him of Shōko's victory in the election.
11	"Military Tribunal #54"; Transliteration: "Gunji Hōtei dai 54-gō" (Japanese: 軍事法廷第54号)	Osamu Kamei	Ichirō Ōkouchi	June 21, 2013	TBA	
The Dorssian 54th Military Tribunal tries JIOR Prime Minister Ryuuji Sashinami on the charge of falsely touting JIOR neutrality. Meanwhile, Akira opens up to Shōko but panics over everyone's excitement to hear her speak. Elsewhere, Saki and Haruto go around the city ruins for the day, visiting a bar and a movie theater. As Saki's feelings of wanting companionship are returned by Haruto, they are interrupted as Module 77 meets the Dorssian blockade en route to the Moon. As Module 77 prepares for battle, L-elf has the Valvraves move push the Module away from the blockade, causing the Dorssians to break formation and pursue as par his plan to have the Valvrave 01's Harakiri Blade destroy them in one strike. Meanwhile, Admiral Delius Wartenberg threatens Ryuuji in an attempt to get Shōko to surrender. While she struggles to decide on a course of action, Valvrave 01's Harakiri Blade annihilates the Dorssian forces, subsequently killing Ryuuji, much to Shōko's agony. Having predicted L-elf's course of actions, Cain makes a surprise attack beneath Module 77, infiltrating with a squadron of Dorssian soldiers including A-drei while having H-nuen use a Drilling Mecha to plow straight through the heart of the Module. With the Valvrave 01 temporarily unable to move, Haruto has Saki return him to the Module to rescue Shōko and surprises Saki with a sudden marriage proposal.
12	"The Heretic Activates"; Transliteration: "Kidō Suru Itansha" (Japanese: 起動する異端者)	Kō Matsuo	Ichirō Ōkouchi	June 28, 2013	TBA	
Following Saki's rejection, Haruto makes plans for a counterattack with L-elf. Meanwhile, the Drilling Mecha starts releasing poison gas while making its way towards Sakimori Academy. Elsewhere, Cain infiltrates the hangar and takes Takumi hostage while Satomi asks Shōko to rescue Akira from inside the school. Afterwards, L-elf suggests using the Valvrave 01 as a Trojan Horse to infiltrate the Dorssian forces, however the plan quickly falls apart when they are confronted by Cain waiting atop the Valvrave 01. At the same time, Team Piedra Del Sol use special mecha armed with heat transferring weapons to immobilize the Valvraves 03, 04 and 05. Back in the hangar, Haruto and L-elf are single-handedly overpowered by Cain, although Haruto immobilizes Cain to allow L-elf to escape, to no avail as A-drei stops him. Meanwhile, Akira finds the resolve to leave her hideout when Shōko is knocked unconscious by the Drilling Mecha and boards the Valvrave 06, saving Shōko and using its hacking capabilities to destroy the Drilling Mecha. In the chaos, L-elf and Haruto manage to board the Valvrave 01 and attempt to kill Cain, although much to their horror, he survives and activates the inoperable Valvrave 02 with the Prue AI. As the Valvrave 02 takes a humanoid shape with plasma limbs, L-elf deduces that Cain isn't human. Elsewhere, the Magius organization gathers.
Part 2
13	"Bonds of the Curse"; Transliteration: "Noroi no Kizuna" (Japanese: 呪いの絆)	Osamu Kamei	Ichirō Ōkouchi	October 10, 2013	TBA	
While the Magius initiate Amadeus, the Valvrave 01 faces off against the Valvrave 02 and becomes steadily overpowered in combat. Eventually Valvrave 02 rips through Valvrave 01's armor and exposes its engine, at which point the Prue and Pino AIs of both manifest. As Cain recognizes their importance, the Prue AI seemingly malfunctions causing Valvrave 02 to overload and prompting Cain to retreat along with his forces. Two months later, after Module 77 successfully arrives at the Moon, New JIOR starts receiving international support albeit carefully overseen by the ARUS government. Meanwhile, Haruto has L-elf and Takumi monitor his regression syndrome, much to Saki's disapproval. Later on, as Satomi, Takahi and L-elf prepare to be escorted to Earth by the Valvraves, L-elf confronts Haruto as his regression worsens and reveals the nature of the Valvrave power source—information particles called Runes, which are replenished every time Haruto's Kamitsuki feeds on a person. Resolving to bear the burden of the Valvraves on his own, Haruto makes a pact with L-elf to only feed on him. Finally, with the Valvraves replenished, they leave the Moon en route to Earth and while fighting off the Dorssian blockade, Haruto resolves to locate the Valvrave creators and learn how to revert to becoming human once more before destroying the Valvraves himself. In the epilogue, Amadeus meets with Cain and they oversee the construction of numerous reverse engineered Valvrave units.
14	"Siblings in the Atmosphere"; Transliteration: "Taikiken no Kyōdai" (Japanese: 大気圏の兄妹)	Shigeru Ueda	Jun Kumagai	October 17, 2013	TBA	
Having made it past the Dorssian blockade, the Valvrave pilots return to the transport ship for a breather while Akira refuses to leave Unit 06. Afterwards, Takumi outlines a course to the Ookuma District. Later, as rumors of Akira's past are held in check, she reluctantly leaves the safety of Unit 06 and upon running into Marie, the two share a tender moment with respect to having Shōko as a mutual friend. Afterwards, the New JIOR transport ship successfully commandeers a landing shuttle and feigns clearance through the Space Station's Follow Rings, despite being discovered by the Dorssians due to Satomi's judgement. As Satomi blames himself and recalls how he failed to defend Akira from being bullied after she was caught hacking a school entrance exam for him, the Valvraves soon overheat, leaving the shuttle defenseless. Although Akira selflessly defends the shuttle, Unit 06 finds itself thrown out of the Follow Rings and beyond help. However, Haruto manages to get to Akira after defeating the Dorssian mecha using a new Familiar weapon. Thinking fast, Akira hacks into the ground control radio transmissions and Satomi manages to decipher a new landing trajectory which allows the shuttle to rescue Units 01 and 06, much to L-elf's hesitance. Now way off-course, the ship plummets through Earth's atmosphere and eventually crash lands deep within Dorssian territory.
15	"Return to Carlstein"; Transliteration: "Karurusutain e no Kikan" (Japanese: カルルスタインへの帰還)	Daiki Nishimura	Ichirō Ōkouchi	October 24, 2013	TBA	
As the Dorssians discover the location of the crashed transport shuttle, the New JIORians regroup and L-elf devises a plan to obtain a new transport vehicle from the Dorssian military itself by using Saki and Akira. Meanwhile, Module 77 constructs a false Valvrave and the ARUS government uses the opportunity to pressure the Dorssians into thinking the Module houses more Valvrave Units while they wait for the Magius to make its move. Elsewhere, as L-elf leads Akira and Saki through a canyon passage, they arrive at a covert military camp called the Carlstein facility and are soon discovered by two of its agents-in-training. After easily taking them down, L-elf then has Saki and Akira possess the agents and infiltrate the base in an attempt to lure its occupants into an explosive trap beneath the canyon. Meanwhile, Marie enters the Valvrave 01 cockpit in an attempt to find out more about Haruto's miraculous healing and surprisingly discovers that the Pino AI knows her. At the same time, the Valvraves 03 and 05 successfully destroy the Dorssian Ideal Blume mobile base, but find themselves facing a new Dorssian weapon—two Kirchbaum mecha which immediately cut through the Valvrave 03. Finally, as Marie confronts Haruto on his true nature, L-elf shoots her in the head before Haruto can explain himself. However, much to their astonishment, Marie survives and stands up.
16	"Marie Set Free"; Transliteration: "Marie Kaihou" (Japanese: マリエ解放)	Kō Matsuo	Ichirō Ōkouchi	October 31, 2013	TBA	
As Marie's survival stuns Haruto and L-elf, the Valvraves 03 and 05 become steadily overpowered by the augmented Kirchbaum mechs. Despite Saki's attempts to lure the Dorssian ground forces into the trap, A-drei anticipates L-elf's plan, forcing him to detonate the bombs while H-neun attacks the crevasse. Afterwards, Marie awakens and rushes into the buried Valvrave 01 at the sight of L-elf and the Pino AI explains the nature of her amnesia. Meanwhile, as A-drei and Saki find themselves trapped in another part of the crevasse, he explains their murder of a Dorssian Royalist upon noticing L-elf's markings on the rock face. Elsewhere, the Pino AI explains that Marie was used as a test pilot in the early stages of Project VVV and fed on the Runes of her memories—explaining her amnesia. As things quickly go haywire, L-elf urges Marie to pilot the Valvrave 01 to save her friends. Using Shōko's friendship as motivation, Marie then uses the Valvrave 01 and easily eradicates the Dorssian forces, with her Runes greatly amplifying its abilities—at the cost of her memories. As L-elf and the rest of the New JIORians use the confusion to commandeer a Dorssian transport ship, Akira intercepts a Dorssian Royalist transmission offering to aid them. Finally, the Valvrave 01's Harakiri Blade decimates the remaining Dorssians, subsequently erasing the last of Marie's memories.
17	"The Rune Abyss"; Transliteration: "Jōhō Genshi (Rune) no Shin'en" (Japanese: 情報原子(RUNE)の深淵)	Satoshi Toba	Jun Kumagai	November 7, 2013	TBA	
Haruto, L-elf and Takumi learn from the Pino AI that the Valvrave 01 began extracting the Runes of Marie's life force when she ran out of memories, killing her in the process. Also showing mild signs of the same phenomenon, this new revelation rattles Haruto to the point of becoming terrified of operating the Valvrave 01. Afterwards, L-elf announces that they will ally with the Dorssian Royalists and aid them in destroying a Dorssian Military submarine known as "The Phantom." Meanwhile, X-eins informs H-nuen of his invitation to a private meeting in Grünau by Cain which prompts an investigation by H-neun. Haruto and L-elf later infiltrate the Phantom ship and shockingly discover a covert room where Runes are harvested from humans. Simultaneously, Cain attacks H-neun in his Grünau villa when the latter stumbles upon on a Magius meeting whereby they intend to use X-eins and the collected Runes for a particular ceremony. At the same time, the Dorssians discover the New JIORians and upon deeming Haruto mentally unfit, L-elf tries to have Satomi protect them with the Valvrave 01 much to Haruto's protest. However as Haruto and L-elf recognize their feelings of powerlessness, the former uses Unit 01 to repel the Dorssians while resolving to end the war before the Valvrave takes his own life. Meanwhile, as X-eins discovers the ruined meeting, another Phantom ship makes its way to the Moon.
18	"A Father's Wish"; Transliteration: "Chichi no Negai" (Japanese: 父の願い)	Yukihiro Iwata	Ichirō Ōkouchi	November 14, 2013	TBA	
When the New JIORians learn of the Phantom ship's course to the Moon, L-elf decides to steal an antique multistage rocket to make the return trip to the Moon, as well as rescue some captive JIORian citizens in the nearby city of Dorssiana—including Haruto's father, Soichi Tokishima. The New JIORians infiltrate the city to secure the rocket while Haruto, L-elf, Kyūma and Takumi rendezvous with Kriemhild, who is actually a Royalist, and her men. However, when Kriemhild mentions the name "Mikhail", L-elf acknowledges it to be his pre-Carlstein name and correctly deduces that she received assistance from Lieselotte, the only person in Dorssia who knew his real name. To the shock and confusion of both the New JIORians and Kriemhild's squad, L-Elf abandons the operation to search the city for Lieselotte. Deciding to move ahead with the plan, Haruto's group meets up with the captive JIORians, who turn out to be the scientists behind Project VVV, with Soichi himself at its head, much to Haruto's shock. Soichi explains that the project used JIOR military funding to create new lifeforms, with the goal of attaining the next step in human evolution—using the genetically modified embryos of the Sakimori students. Haruto fails to convince his father that their abilities are a curse and not a blessing, and, seeing Soichi reveling in the project's "success", knocks him to the ground, declaring that he will destroy the Valvraves. Meanwhile, as Cain begins to guess the New JIORians' plans, L-elf manages to successfully break into Lieselotte's prison tower, and asks that she let him rescue her.
19	"Sadness is Like the Falling Snow"; Transliteration: "Kanashimi wa Furu Yuki no Gotoku" (Japanese: 悲しみは降る雪のごとく)	Osamu Kamei	Ichirō Ōkouchi	November 21, 2013	TBA	
L-elf declares his love for Lieselotte while Q-vier later intercepts their escape attempt. Cain also anticipates L-elf's plan of using the rocket and has his forces surround the hangar and destroy its runway. In the meantime, the Valvrave 01 interrupts L-elf and Q-vier's knife duel and L-elf has Haruto take Lieselotte while he works on keeping a step ahead of Cain. Afterwards, the Pino AI detects similarities with Lieselotte who admits her race as a Magius. Lieselette explains that the Magius crash landed on Earth a few centuries ago and began possessing Earth's lifeforms in order to survive. She continues that as time passed they created an organization called the Council of One Hundred and One to conceal their existence from humanity while securing Runes for their survival and shows Haruto a mark of her rejection to the Council, which constantly drains her of Runes. Afterwards, L-elf manages to make it to the drawbridge controls of a road to the east of the hangar and has the New JIORians use it as a runway for the rocket which then manages to take off despite one of the hydrogen tanks being ruptured by the Dorssian military. Lamenting her feelings for L-elf, Lieselotte uses the last of her Magius powers to seal the fuel tank before it separates and allows the rocket to safely gain enough thrust to achieve escape velocity—killing her in the process.
20	"The Kamitsuki Revealed"; Transliteration: "Abakareta Kamitsuki" (Japanese: 曝かれたカミツキ)	Noriyuki Nomata	Jun Kumagai	November 28, 2013	TBA	
Upon arriving in outer space, the Valvrave pilots manage to locate and destroy the threatening Phantom ship and return to Module 77 to a grand reception by their schoolmates. In the meantime, L-elf falls into a state of depression after learning that Lieselotte's death was inevitable. Elsewhere, Cain learns that the once peaceful Dorssian Royalists have begun staging public displays of resistance against the Dorssian Military due to Lieselotte's death. At the same time, Haruto remains burdened with all the tasks they've yet to accomplish although Kyūma tries explaining that they can only do what they can for the time being. Sometime later, Haruto visits L-elf and discovers the latter's shattered resolve. Afterwards, Shōko relays the news that ARUS and eighty-four other counties had voted to condemn Dorssia for their initial attack following pressure from the New JIORian government hence forcing Dorssia into peace talks or risk being sanctioned. The next day, ARUS President Anderson and his associates arrive in Module 77 to begin their talks and are interrupted by an international broadcast from Amadeus. Amadeus then reveals the captured Saki and executes her on live television much to the world's horror. However Saki's regenerative powers manifest, resurrecting her and disrupting the peace talks with Amadeus revealing that the Valvrave pilots are not human.
21	"The Cost of Lies"; Transliteration: "Uso no Daishō" (Japanese: 嘘の代償)	Shigeru Ueda	Jun Kumagai	December 5, 2013	TBA	
ARUS News reporter Barlet broadcasts his discovery of the Phantom ship in Module 77's hangar filled with captive JIORians being drained of their Runes. The Magius organization then has Amadeus claim that the Dorssian Military were at war against the inhuman Module 77 occupants. Anderson immediately takes action by deeming all the Module's inhabitants an international threat, whereupon Youhei Onai's attempts to reason with the President result in him being shot, triggering a massacre of the Sakimori students. Anderson then forms the Dorssio-ARUS Alliance with Amadeus to eliminate Module 77. As the remaining students scramble to escape, the last ship, with Shōko on board, gets damaged by the incoming united armies. Out of fear, Iori Kitagawa and the other occupants then trick Haruto into returning to the ship and restrain him, revealing that Anderson has offered them safe passage in exchange for Haruto. During the confrontation, Iori's rages gets the best of her and she shoots Haruto, who resurrects. Feeling betrayed by Haruto's secrets, Shōko agrees to hand over Haruto and L-elf. Anderson then reveals he was lying, having never intended to spare any of the students, and orders the allied forces to fire on the ship, but Valvrave 05 intervenes and shields the ship from the blast. Kyūma then has Akira and Raizo protect the ship while he goes to save Haruto, despite Unit 05 sustaining heavy damage. Kyūma manages to rescue Haruto and L-elf, and, after finally getting Haruto to admit his love for Shōko, throws them to safety before he and Valvrave 05 destroy the attacking Kirchbaum in a suicide attack.
22	"Fists of the Moon"; Transliteration: "Getsumen no Kobushi" (Japanese: 月面の拳(こぶし))	Masahiro Sonoda	Ichirō Ōkouchi	December 12, 2013	TBA	
After having crash landed on a remote part of the moon Haruto mourns Kyūma's death while L-elf tries and gives up on devising a plan. At the same time the Dorssians transport Module 77 to a Dorssian Dyson Sphere. Elsewhere, A-drei interrogates Saki on L-elf's betrayal and realizes that he was acting on their shared goal of revolutionizing the corrupted Dorssia. Meanwhile Haruto and L-elf start blaming each other for everything that had happened which quickly escalates into a physical confrontation. Meanwhile, Shōko decides to pilot the Valvrave 01 and protect the Sakimori students but finds it inoperable until presented with the start up question. The Pino AI then replays the video of Haruto first piloting Unit 01 and she breaks into tears after realizing that everything he did was for her. Back on the moon, Haruto reveals to a disbelieving L-elf that Lieselotte was a Magius, with the latter soon connecting the dots. After realizing that they have much yet to accomplish before they die, they put aside their differences and agree to build a unified world where everyone including humans and Kamitsuki can live in peace. They then manage to ignite a rescue flare using Haruto's Kamitsuki powers which draws a squadron of Dorssian mecha. Much to Haruto and L-elf's surprise however, Saki and the Valvrave 04 come to their rescue. At the same time, X-eins demands answers after A-drei releases Saki.
23	"The Operation to Retake Module 77"; Transliteration: "Mojūru 77 Dakkan Sakusen" (Japanese: モジュール77奪還作戦)	Osamu Kamei	Ichirō Ōkouchi	December 19, 2013	TBA	
X-eins reveals his knowledge of A-drei's liberation plans and plays H-neun's last audio recording which reveals his murder at the hands of Cain—a Magius. Elsewhere, after defending the New JIORian escape ships, the Valvrave pilots meet with Satomi, Takahi, Yusuke and Takumi and inform them of a plan to recapture Module 77. Meanwhile L-elf successfully infiltrates Module 77 and allies himself with A-drei and X-eins after their goals to stop Cain finally align. Haruto then makes his way to the lead escape ship and despite a harsh reunion with Shōko, promises to reveal the truth to her. Amadeus and President Anderson then hold another press conference in Module 77 where the former endorses the Dorssio-ARUS united front against the New JIORians. At the same time, the four Valvrave units engage the army of allied forces defending Module 77. As the Valvrave 04 begins taking damage against eight Kirchbaum mecha, Haruto starts losing more memories of Shōko. Akira soon manages to hack into Module 77's communications but comes under Q-vier's attack. However Raizo intercepts Q-vier and buys enough time for Akira to complete the hacking—at the cost of his life and the Valvrave 03's destruction. With Module 77's communications secured, L-elf then storms the press conference, slitting Amadeus' throat and revealing his shocking revival to the world.
24	"Liberation Towards Tomorrow"; Transliteration: "Mirai e no Kakumei" (Japanese: 未来への革命)	Hakaru Matsuo & Naoya Andō	Ichirō Ōkouchi	December 26, 2013	TBA	
The modified Valvrave 02 piloted by Cain destroys the Module 77 communications terminal and proceeds to clash with the Valvrave 01. As Unit 01 becomes overwhelmed by Unit 02's power, X-eins' Kirchbaum intercepts the duel to avenge H-neun. As the Magius also pass off the conference's events as an act to the world, A-drei's Kirchbaum finds himself blocked by a battle crazed Q-vier. When Unit 01 finds itself blasted straight into Module 77, X-eins mounts a failed suicide attack against Unit 02. In the midst of Haruto's Rune deprivation, L-elf shows up and they combine their skills against Cain by way of a possession. At the same time, A-drei kills Q-vier after failing to reason with him. As the Valvrave 01 and 02 head into space once more, Cain blames the Valvrave pilots for disrupting the Magius' attempt at world peace. Amidst the chaos, President Anderson also exposes the Magius to the world, sparking various Dorssian uprisings in favor of the Royalists. As Unit 02 pushes Unit 01 to its limit, Haruto calls upon the fighting spirit of his friends, amplifying Unit 01's power and brutally destroys Unit 02, killing Cain whilst also losing all of his memories in the process. In the aftermath, L-elf awakens in the cockpit and rushes to a weakened amnesiac Haruto. Realizing the steep cost of their victory, L-elf sheds tears for his friend before Haruto passes on. In the epilogue, humanity bands together to hunt down the remaining Magius while peace finally dawns on the new world order. Finally, as Saki and Akira conclude the origin story of the Third Galactic Empire to the Prince, Shōko meets two hostile alien lifeforms in the Memorial Core and offers them friendship—echoing what Haruto would have done.

== Theme music ==
The anime uses ten pieces of theme music: two opening themes, four ending themes and four insert songs.

Opening themes

- "Preserved Roses" by T.M.Revolution and Nana Mizuki — Episodes 2 - 12 (Ending theme of Episode 1 / Insert song of Episode 7)
- "Kakumei Dualism" (革命デュアリズム) by Nana Mizuki and T.M.Revolution — Episodes 14 - 24 (Ending theme of Episode 13 / Insert song of Episode 22)

Ending themes

- "Boku Janai" (僕じゃない; lit. 'Not Me') by Angela — Episodes 2 - 6 (Insert song of Episodes 12 and 19)
- "Soba ni Iru yo" (そばにいるよ; "I'm By Your Side") by Elisa — Episodes 7 - 12 (Insert song of Episodes 16 and 24)
- "Realism" by Elisa — Episodes 14 - 18
- "Akai Memorīzu o Anata ni" (赤いメモリーズをあなたに; "To You Red Memories") by Momoko Kanade — Episodes 19 - 23

Insert songs

- "Sakimori Gakuen Kōka" (咲森学園校歌; Sakimori Academy Anthem) by the students of Sakimori Academy — Episode 4
- "Good luck for you" by Haruka Tomatsu — Episode 5
- "Can you save my heart?" by Momoko Kanade — Episode 6
- "Mother land" by Yuuka Nanri — Episodes 8 and 21

== Home media ==
Aniplex released the full first season on six Blu-ray and DVD volumes in Japan between June 26, 2013 and November 27, 2013. The second season was also released in a similar manner in Japan between December 25, 2013 and May 28, 2014. Season 1 was released in its entirety by Aniplex of America on September 18, 2014. Hanabee Entertainment also released the series on disc format beginning on October 1, 2014.

Aniplex (Season 1) (Region 2/A - Japan)
Vol.	Episodes	Blu-ray / DVD artwork	Bonus disc	Release date	Ref.
1	1, 2	Haruto Tokishima	Kick Off Event DVD / Drama CD Volume 1	June 26, 2013	
2	3, 4	L-elf	Talk CD Volume 1	July 24, 2013	
3	5, 6	Shōko Sashinami & Saki Rukino	Drama CD Volume 2	August 21, 2013	
4	7, 8	Kyūma Inuzuka & Aina Sakurai	Talk CD Volume 2	September 25, 2013	
5	9, 10	A-drei	Drama CD Volume 3	October 23, 2013	
6	11, 12	Akira Renbōkoji	Talk CD Volume 3	November 27, 2013	

Aniplex (Season 2) (Region 2/A - Japan)
Vol.	Episodes	Blu-ray / DVD artwork	Bonus disc	Release date	Ref.
1	13, 14	L-elf & Haruto Tokishima	Event DVD / Drama CD Volume 4	December 25, 2013	
2	15, 16	Marie Nobi & Pino	Valvrave the Liberator Summit Event DVD	January 22, 2014	
3	17, 18	H-neun & X-eins	Talk CD Volume 4	February 26, 2014	
4	19, 20	Raizō Yamada	Drama CD Volume 5	March 26, 2014	
5	21, 22	Cain Dressel	Talk CD Volume 5	April 23, 2014	
6	23, 24	L-elf & Haruto Tokishima	Drama CD Volume 6	May 28, 2014	

Aniplex of America (Region 1/A - North America)
Vol.	Episodes	Release date	Ref.
1	1–12	September 18, 2014	
2	13–24	January 20, 2015	

Hanabee Entertainment (Region 4/B - Australia / New Zealand)
Vol.	Episodes	BD / DVD Release date	Ref.
1	1–12	October 1, 2014	
