= Nippon Budokan =

Sporting arena in Chiyoda, Tokyo, Japan

- 日本武道館
- Budokan
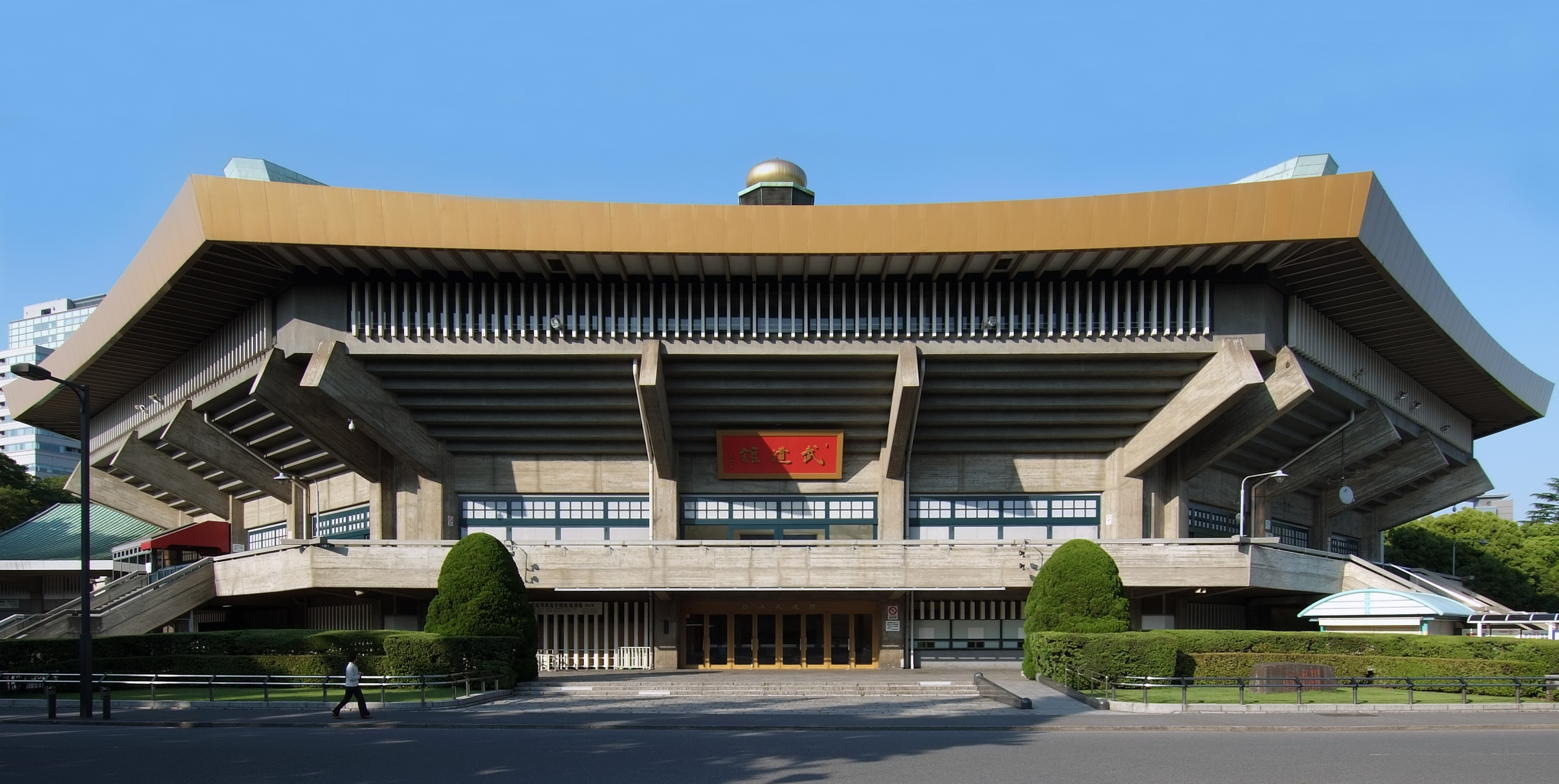
- Interactive map of Nippon Budokan
- Location: 2–3 Kitanomarukōen, Chiyoda, Tokyo 102-8321, Japan
- Coordinates: 35°41′36″N 139°45′00″E
- Owner: The Nippon Budokan Foundation
- Capacity: 14,471
- Field size: Height: 42 metres (138 ft)
- Public transit: Tokyo Metro/Toei Subway (at Kudanshita): Toei Shinjuku Line; Tozai Line; Hanzomon Line

Construction
- Built: 1964
- Opened: October 3, 1964
- Renovated: 2020
- Cost: 2 billion Japanese yen; (US$5.6 million in 1964)
- Architect: Mamoru Yamada
- Main contractor: Takenaka Corporation

Website
- www.nipponbudokan.or.jp/english

The Nippon Budokan (Japanese: 日本武道館, Hepburn: Nippon Budōkan; lit. 'Japan Martial Arts Hall'), often shortened to simply the Budokan, is an indoor arena in Chiyoda, Tokyo, Japan. It was originally built for the inaugural Olympic judo competition in the 1964 Summer Olympics. The Budokan was a popular venue for Japanese professional wrestling for a time, and it has hosted numerous other sporting events, such as the 1967 Women's Volleyball World Championship. Most recently, the arena hosted the judo and karate competitions at the 2020 Summer Olympics and judo at the 2020 Summer Paralympics.

While its primary purpose is to host martial arts contests, the arena has gained additional fame as one of the world's most outstanding musical performance venues. A number of famous acts have played at the Budokan. The Beatles were the first rock group to play there, in a series of five concerts, each lasting 30 minutes, from June 30 to July 2, 1966. ABBA ended their last tour and held their final live performance there in March 1980. Numerous other notable acts have recorded live albums at the Budokan for the good acoustics and audience behaviour.

== Location ==
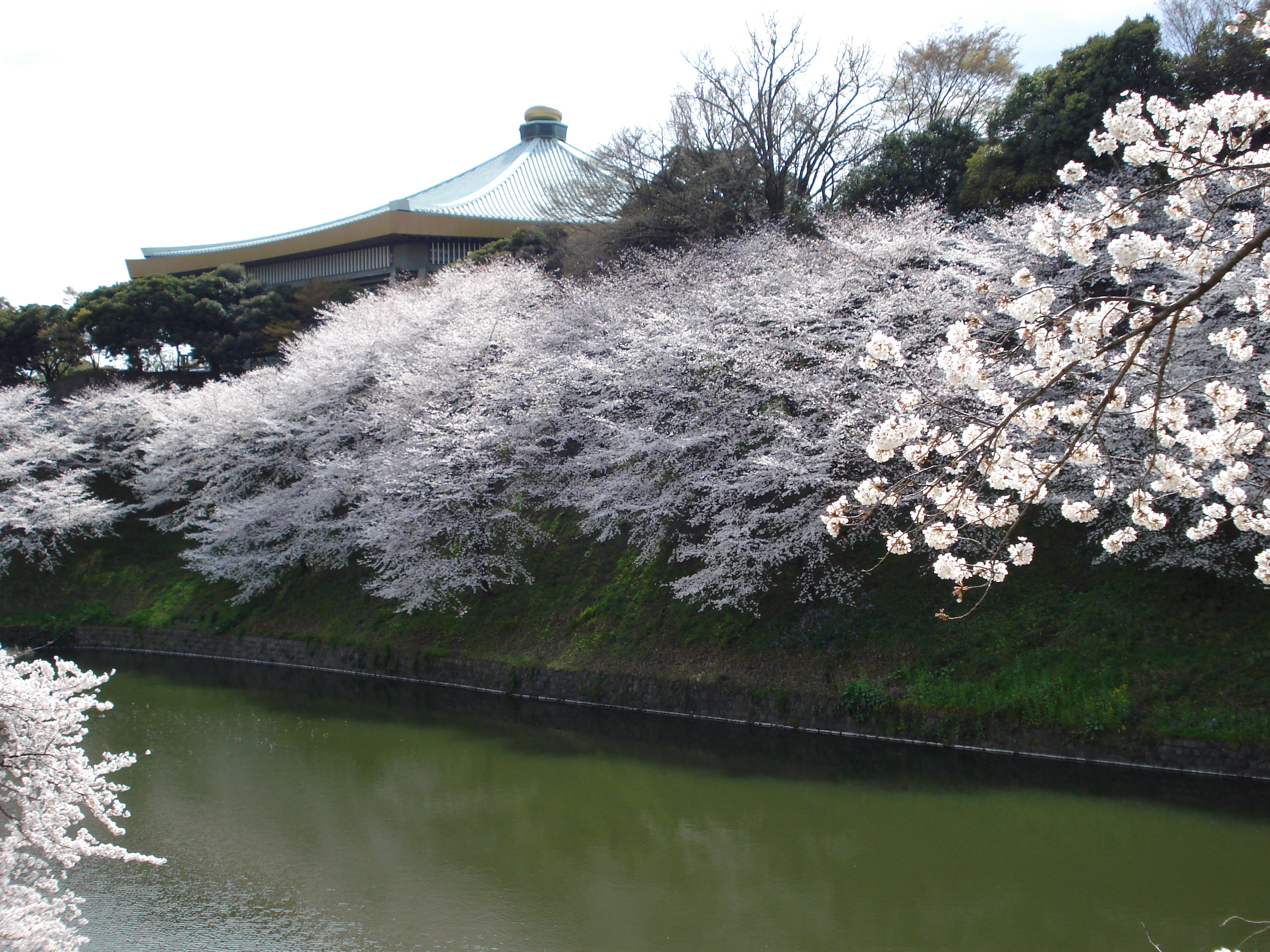
The Nippon Budokan during the cherry blossom season

The Nippon Budokan is located in Kitanomaru Park in the center of Tokyo, two minutes' walking distance from Kudanshita Subway Station, and near the Imperial Palace and Yasukuni Shrine. The 42 metres (138 ft) high octagonal structure holds 14,471 people (arena seats: 2,946, 1st floor seats: 3,199, 2nd floor seats: 7,846, standee: 480). The building is modeled after Yumedono (Hall of Dreams) in Hōryū-ji in Nara.

== History ==
=== Prehistory ===
The area around the Nippon Budokan was originally where the Tsuchi-do Shrine (formerly Tayasu Myojin), the guardian deity of Kanto, was relocated when Dokan Ota built Edo Castle, and later, when Ieyasu Tokugawa entered the city, it became the residence of the Kanto magistrate Kiyonari Naito and others, and was therefore called Daikan-cho. Later, it became the residence of Tadanaga Tokugawa and Tsunashige Tokugawa, and from the mid-Edo period onwards, the Tayasu-Tokugawa family, one of the three branches of the Tokugawa clan, had their residence there, but after the Meiji Restoration it was demolished and became a barracks for the Imperial Guard Division.

=== History leading up to the construction and the Olympics ===
In June 1961, when judo was selected as an official sport for the 1964 Summer Olympics in Tokyo, some judo-loving National Diet members formed the Diet Members Judo Association. At the launch celebration held at Nippon Television's outdoor studio, House of Representatives member Matsutarō Shōriki, who became the association's chairman, stated, "I want to build a world-class martial arts hall in the center of Tokyo and promote the development and spread of this art." On June 30, the Diet Members' Association for the Construction of the Martial Arts Hall (Chairman: Matsutaro Shoriki; Vice-chairmen: Mikio Mizuta, Shigeyoshi Matsumae, Yonosuke Sato, and Munenori Akagi) was formed.

This initiative received signatures from 525 cross-party lawmakers, including House of Representatives Speaker Ichirō Kiyose, House of Councillors Speaker Matsuno Kakuhei, Prime Minister Hayato Ikeda, Japan Socialist Party Chairman Jōtarō Kawakami, Democratic Socialist Party Chairman Suehiro Nishio, and Japanese Communist Party Chairman Sanzo Nosaka.

On January 31, 1962, with the approval of the Minister of Education, the Nippon Budokan Foundation (Chairman: Matsutaro Shoriki; Vice-chairmen: Atsutaro Kimura, Shigeyoshi Matsumae; chairman of the Board: Munenori Akagi) was established. After much deliberation, the site for the building was finally decided upon in Kitanomaru, and the Nippon Budokan was completed on 15 September 1964. The opening ceremony was held on October 3, in the presence of Emperor Showa and Empress Kojun. On October 15, the Tokyo Olympic martial arts exhibition competitions (kendo, kyudo, and sumo) were held, and from October 20 to 23, the Olympic judo competitions. Since then, in line with its founding purpose, the Nippon Budokan has been used to promote and popularize various martial arts, hosting various martial arts tournaments, and also for various national events with a public mission.

== Events ==
=== Martial arts ===
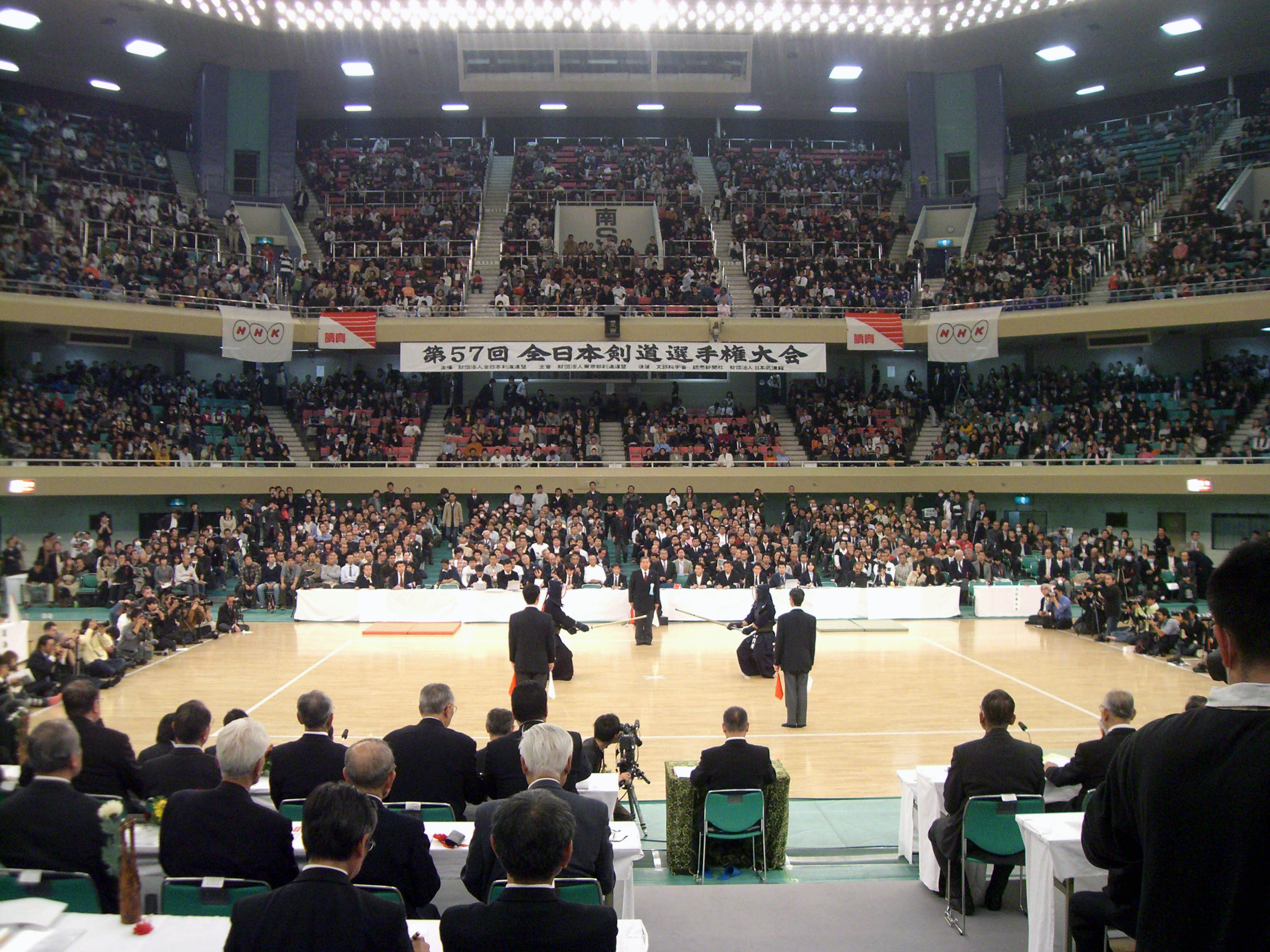
The 57th Japan National Kendo Championship (November 3, 2009)

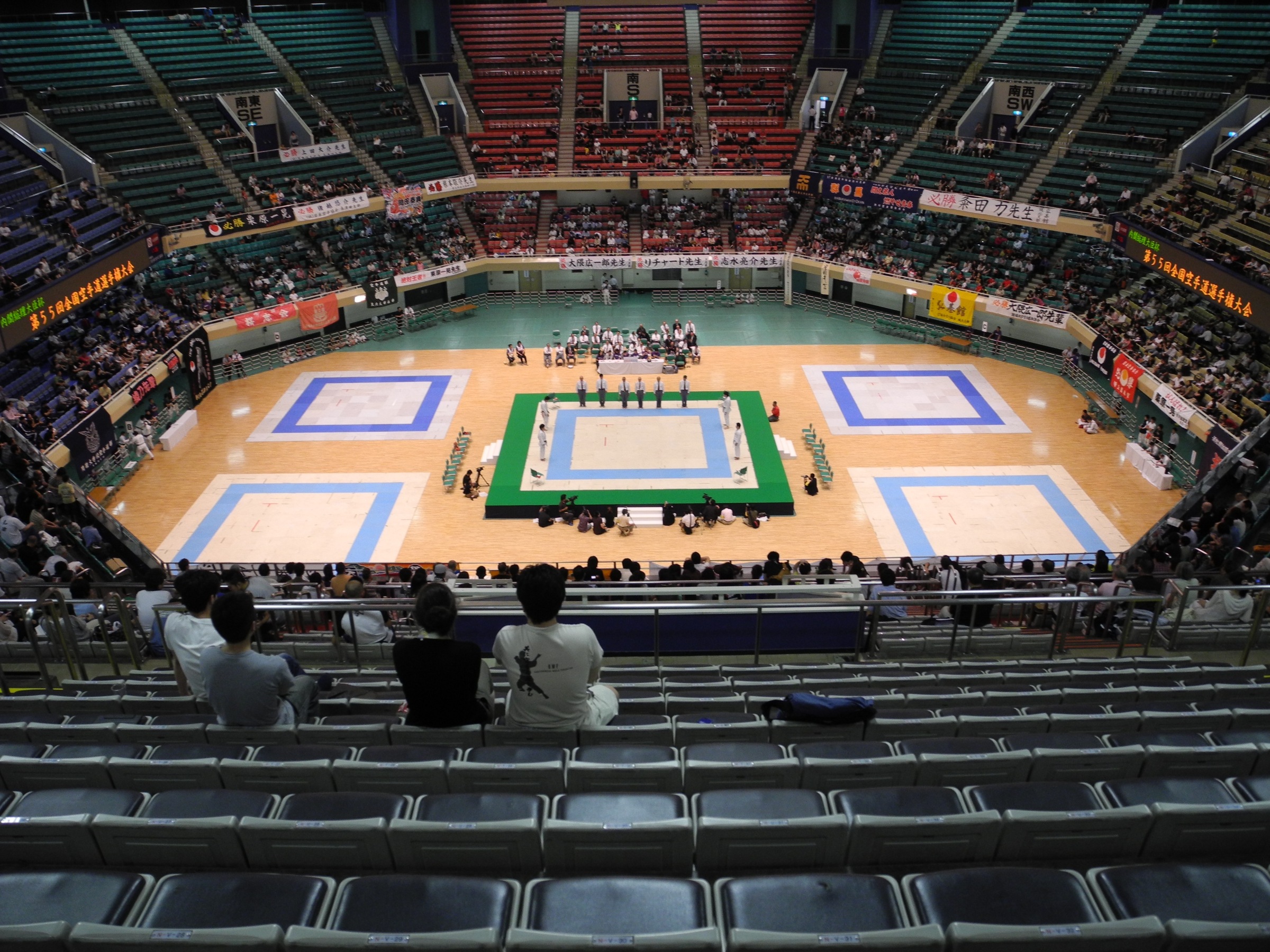
The 55th JKA All-Japan Karate Championship (2012)

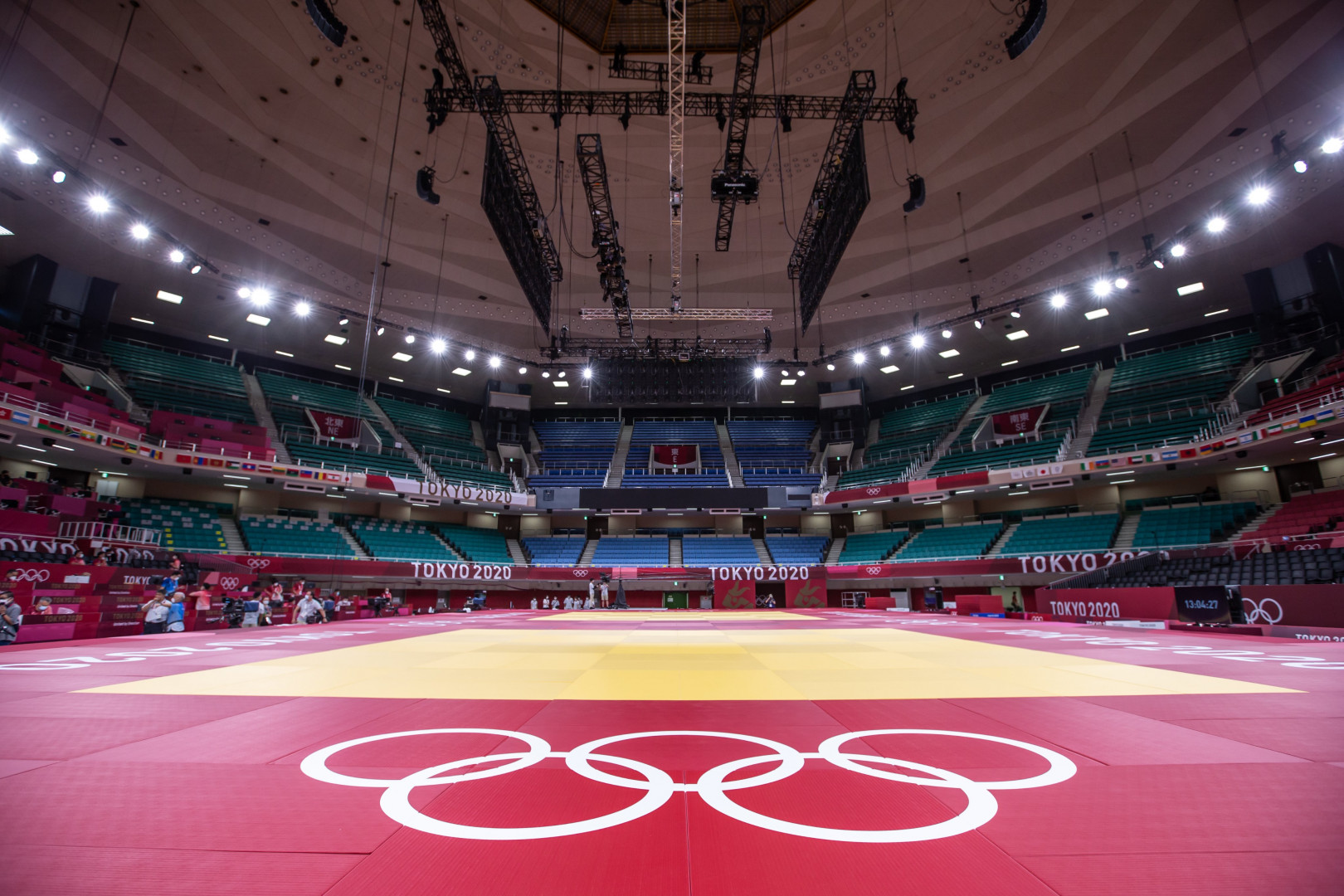
During the 2020 Summer Olympics

Although the Budokan also functions as a venue for big musical events, its primary purpose is for Japanese martial arts. The national championships of the different branches of major martial arts (judo, kendo, karate, aikido, etc.) are held annually at the Budokan. The Budokan has also been associated with professional wrestling's big shows, typically from All Japan Pro Wrestling and Pro Wrestling Noah. However, due to declining audiences following the death of Mitsuharu Misawa and the retirement of Kenta Kobashi, professional wrestling has ceased running regular shows in the Budokan. During Wrestle Kingdom 12, New Japan Pro-Wrestling announced that its yearly G1 Climax tournament's finals would be held at the Budokan.

The Muhammad Ali vs. Antonio Inoki hybrid rules fight held at the Budokan in 1976 is seen as a forerunner to mixed martial arts. K-1, Shooto, Vale Tudo Japan and Pride Fighting Championships have all held events at the arena.

=== Music ===
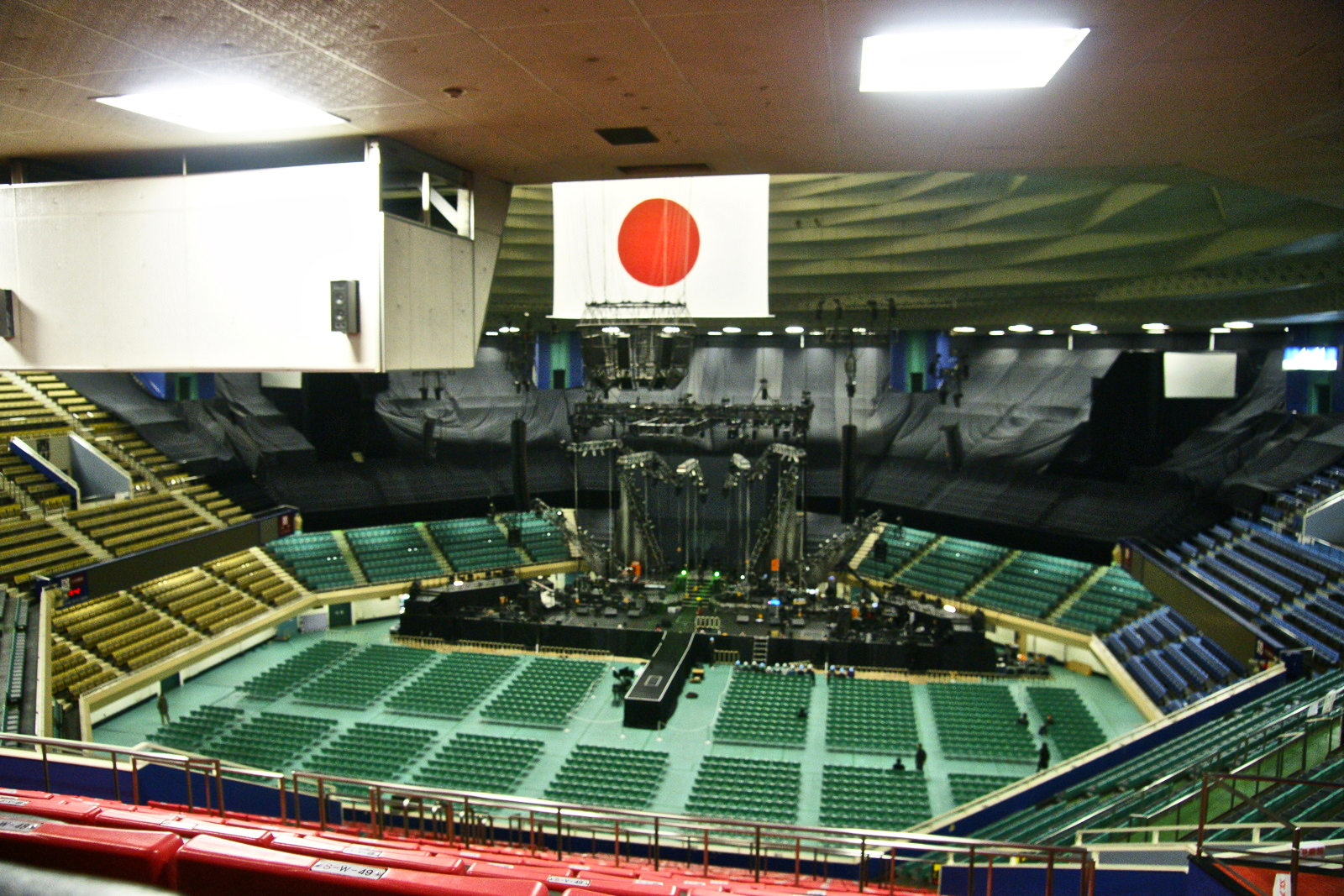
A concert stage at the Budokan in 2009

Outside and inside of Nippon Budokan configured for a concert in 2024

The Beatles were the first rock group to perform at the Budokan in a series of five shows held between June 30 and July 2, 1966. Their appearances were met with opposition from those who felt the appearance of a western pop group would defile the martial arts arena.

In July 1973, Japanese television recorded the Santana performance at the Budokan. The Budokan gained worldwide fame when American artists Cheap Trick and Bob Dylan used the arena to record their performances, Cheap Trick at Budokan (1978) and Bob Dylan at Budokan (1979).

The venue is popular for recording live albums because it has good acoustics, is relatively large and Japanese audiences are known for being highly appreciative when appropriate but quiet during performances. Eric Clapton described the Tokyo audience as "almost overappreciative" in interviews promoting Just One Night (1980), his own live album recorded at the Budokan.

The original Beatles concert is heavily bootlegged on audio and video; the first night's concert video was officially released by Apple Records in Japan only as Beatles Concert at Budokan 1966, and excerpts are shown in The Beatles Anthology, while the second Anthology album included the first show's performances of "Rock and Roll Music" and "She's A Woman". The venue is one of the stages in The Beatles: Rock Band video game.

The record for the most Budokan music concerts is held by Eikichi Yazawa, 142 times as of December 19, 2017.

=== Other events ===
The National Memorial Service for War Dead is held with the attendance of the Prime Minister, the Emperor and the Empress annually in Budokan on August 15, the day of Japan's surrender. A concert was held in honor of Studio Ghibli's 25th anniversary at the Budokan, hosted by Joe Hisaishi. It included repertoire from most of the films Hisaishi composed for Hayao Miyazaki's Studio Ghibli filmography. Diana Ross performed and taped her "Here and Now" television special in 1991 to a sold-out audience. The Japan Record Awards took place in the arena from 1985 to 1993 where all of the artists from around the country receive these awards. Muhammad Ali won a unanimous decision over Mac Foster in their 1972 heavyweight boxing match.

On February 13, 1975, a religious gathering was held to hear Rev. Sun Myung Moon speak.

On August 27, 2011, Japan's three biggest professional wrestling promotions; All Japan Pro Wrestling, New Japan Pro-Wrestling (NJPW) and Pro Wrestling Noah came together to produce a charity event titled All Together at the arena. On August 10, 11 and 12, 2018, NJPW held the final 3 days of the G1 Climax in the Budokan, which marked the first time in 15 years that NJPW has promoted an event there. NJPW once again returned to the arena for the final 3 days of the 2019 G1 Climax. NJPW also held the Best of the Super Jr. and World Tag League finals in December 2021, as well as their 49th Anniversary Show and the final two days of the G1 Climax in 2021.

Joshi wrestling promotion World Wonder Ring Stardom held their All Star Dream Cinderella event on March 3, 2021, making this the first time a joshi company had held an event in the venue in 24 years. Professional wrestler and legend in Japan Kenta Kobashi wrestled his final match in Budokan on May 11, 2013, at an event titled Final Burning in Budokan. Kobashi is synonymous with the arena along with fellow wrestlers Toshiaki Kawada and the late Mitsuharu Misawa.

In November, the Budokan is a venue for the annual Japan Self-Defense Forces Marching Festival, a yearly tradition and the nation's military tattoo first held here in the fall of 1963. Aside from JSDF bands, foreign armed forces military bands are also invited to join the event.

The state funeral of Shinzo Abe was held at the Budokan on September 27, 2022.

=== Other uses ===
The Nippon Budokan is the primary setting of the 1989 fighting game Budokan: The Martial Spirit. Players train in various Japanese martial arts, and must then face off at the Budokan arena against computer-controlled opponents. A fictional concert hall based on the Nippon Budokan appeared in the music video game Guitar Hero III: Legends of Rock (2007) under the name "Kaiju Megadome". The Beatles' appearance at Nippon Budokan was featured in The Beatles: Rock Band (2009). The Nippon Budokan appeared in the Japanese pro-wrestling video game Virtual Pro Wrestling 2: Ōdō Keishō (2000).

== See also ==
- List of indoor arenas in Japan

Preceded by Imperial Garden Theater	Host of the Japan Record Awards; 1985–1993	Succeeded by TBS Broadcast Center
