= Kyoto Tower =

- 京都タワー

General information
- Type: Observation tower
- Location: 721-1 Karasuma-dori; Higashi Shiokoji-cho; Shimogyō-ku, Kyoto 600-8216
- Coordinates: 34°59′15″N 135°45′33″E
- Construction started: 1963
- Completed: 1964
- Opening: December 28, 1964
- Cost: ¥380 million ($1.056 million in 1963)

Height
- Antenna spire: 131 metres (430 ft)

Design and construction
- Architect: Mamoru Yamada
- Structural engineer: Makoto Tanahashi

Kyoto Tower (京都タワー, Kyōto-tawā), now officially renamed Nidec Kyoto Tower, is an observation tower located in Kyoto, Japan. The steel tower is the tallest structure in Kyoto with its observation deck at 100 metres (328 ft) and its spire at 131 metres (430 ft). The 800-ton tower stands atop a 9-story building, which houses a 3-star hotel and several stores. The entire complex stands opposite Kyōto Station.

== History ==
Kyoto Tower was proposed in the early 1960s, and it was planned to be constructed and completed in time to correspond with the 1964 Summer Olympics in Tokyo. Construction began in 1963 on the former site of Kyoto's central post office and was completed near the end of 1964. Unlike many other towers (such as Tokyo Tower) that are constructed using metal lattice frames, Kyoto Tower's interior structure consists of many steel rings stacked on top of each other. The structure was then covered with lightweight steel sheets with a thickness of 12–22 mm (0.47–0.87 in). The sheets were then welded together and painted white. The intended overall effect was for the tower to resemble a Japanese candle.

Designed by modernist architect, Mamoru Yamada with the expert advice of Makoto Tanahashi, a doctor of engineering at Kyoto University, Kyoto Tower was built to withstand the forces of both earthquakes and typhoons. The head of the tower's business division, Tsuyoshi Tamura, claims it can withstand winds of up to 201 mph (90 m/s) and survive an earthquake of far greater magnitude than that of the Great Hanshin or Great Kantō earthquakes.

The tower was first opened to the public on December 28, 1964. Within its first year of opening, 1 million people visited the tower's observation deck. Throughout the years, the tower's draw as a tourist attraction has diminished. By 1999, observation deck ticket sales dropped to less than 400,000 a year, or about 1,100 a day.

=== Controversy ===
Kyoto Tower has been the subject of controversy since it was in its planning phase. Public opposition not only stemmed from the tower's ¥380 million ($1.056 million in 1963) price tag, but also from the fact that many believed the needle-shaped spire was too modern looking for the ancient capital. The construction regulations in Kyoto that restrict a building's maximum height increase the sense of proportion between the tower and the low machiya and ferroconcrete apartment blocks below. These municipal regulations have ensured that the tower maintains its status as the tallest man-made structure in the city since its construction.

Today, reaction to Kyoto Tower remains divided. The modern, glass and steel Kyoto Station and the imposing steel tower directly across the street contrast with ideas of Kyoto as a traditional city. Japanologist Alex Kerr has called the tower "a stake through the heart" of Kyoto. While some disapprove of the tower, many locals have welcomed station and tower, believing them to help add a touch of modernity to the city to ensure that it does not become foreign to the rest of new Japan.

== Facilities ==
Kyoto Tower is split into two distinct structures. The primary structure is the steel spire that begins on the roof of the building below. Tourists may buy tickets and ascend one of the tower's nine elevators to visit the 100-metre (330 ft)-high, 500-person-capacity observation deck. This area is lined with game machines and free telescopes and provides a 360-degree view of the city. From here, nearly all of Kyoto can be seen. The mountains of Higashiyama and Arashiyama are visible on the east and west sides respectively, while Kitayama can be seen to the north. On a clear day, some buildings in Osaka are visible to the south.

The second structure that completely supports the 800-ton tower and gives it its first 30.8 meters of height is a nine-story building. The first four floors of the building house several commercial areas, including a souvenir shop, a 100 yen shop, a bookstore, and a dentist's office. In the basement of the building, there is a spa. Floors 5–9 are devoted to the 160-room, three-star Kyoto Tower Hotel. Atop the building and surrounding the tower is the circular, three-floor restaurant named Sky Lounge "空" KUU.

Adaptations such as a stair lift and ramps have been added to make the observation deck wheelchair accessible.

== Gallery ==
Video of several scenes around Kyoto Tower 2023

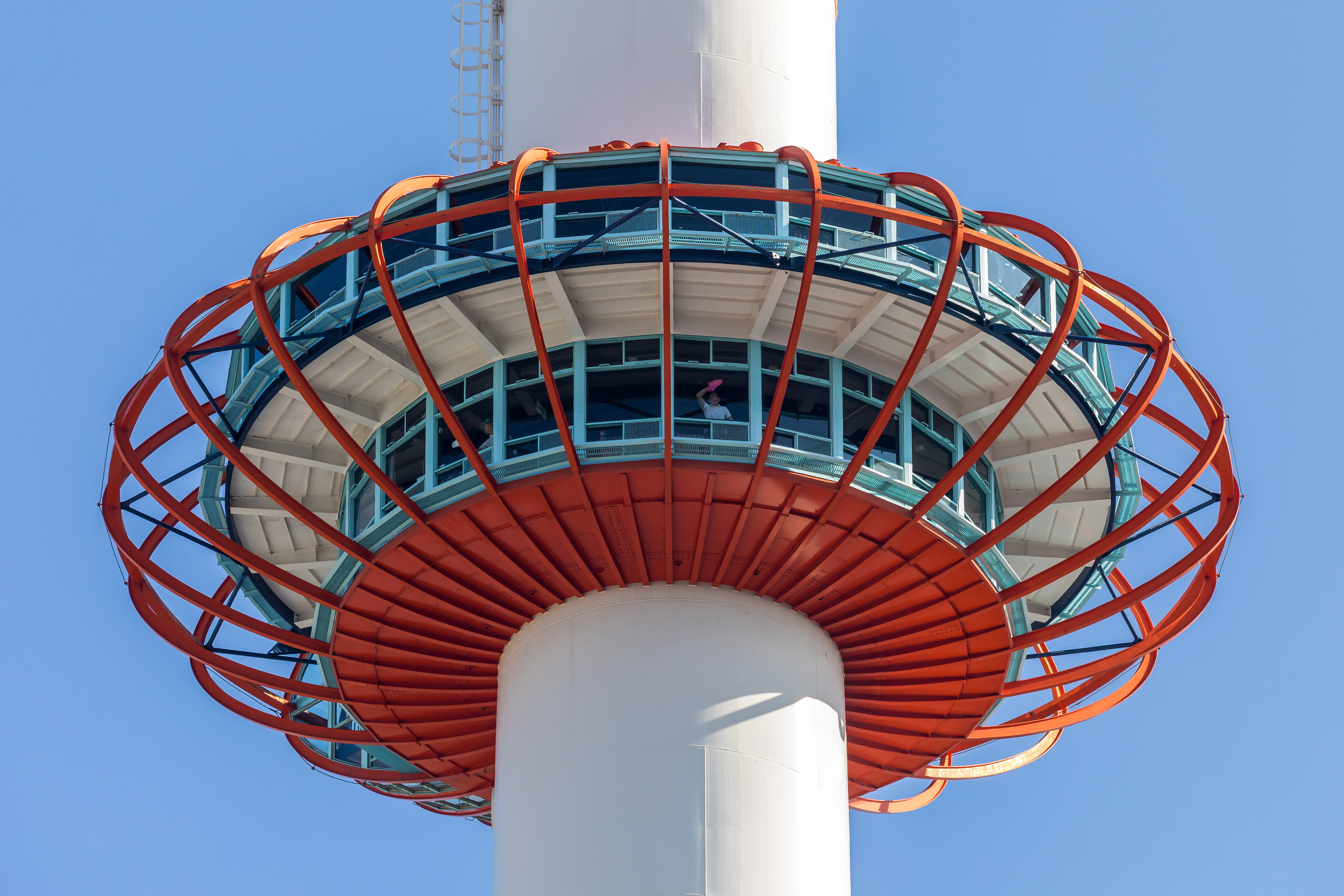
Observation deck with staff cleaning the windows October 2019

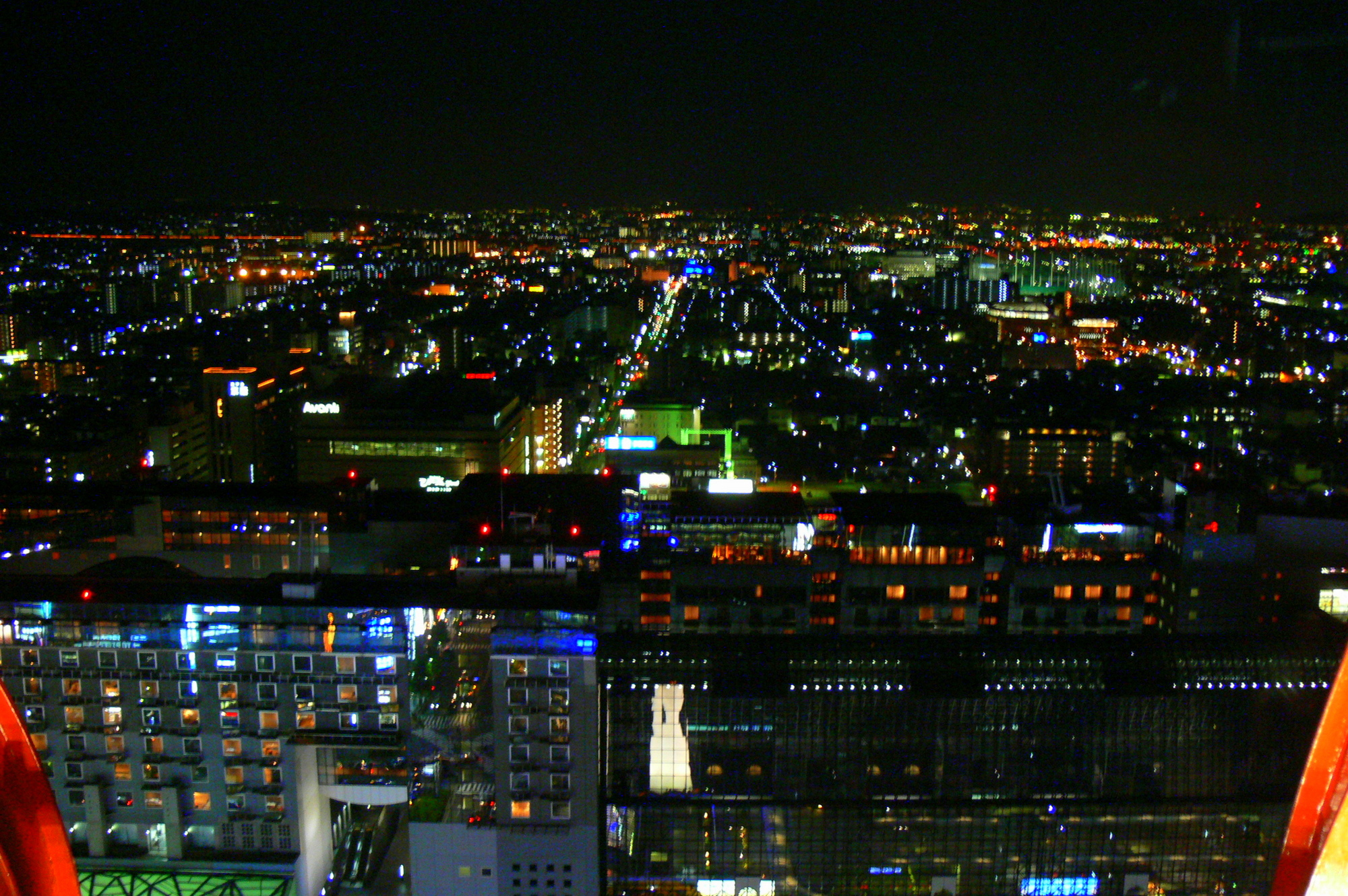
Night scene from Kyoto Tower, 2007

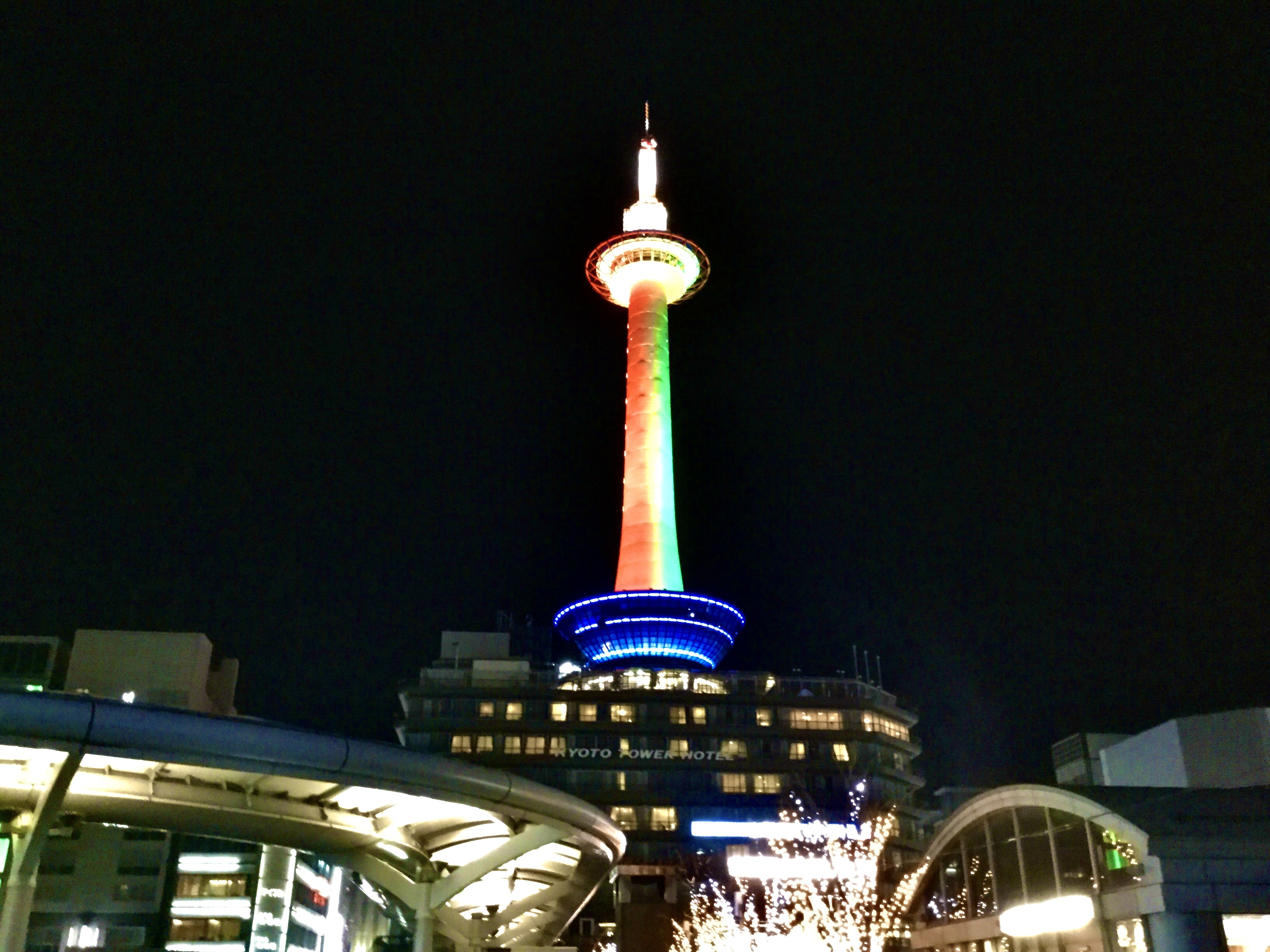
Kyoto Tower lit-up at night on December 24th, 2016

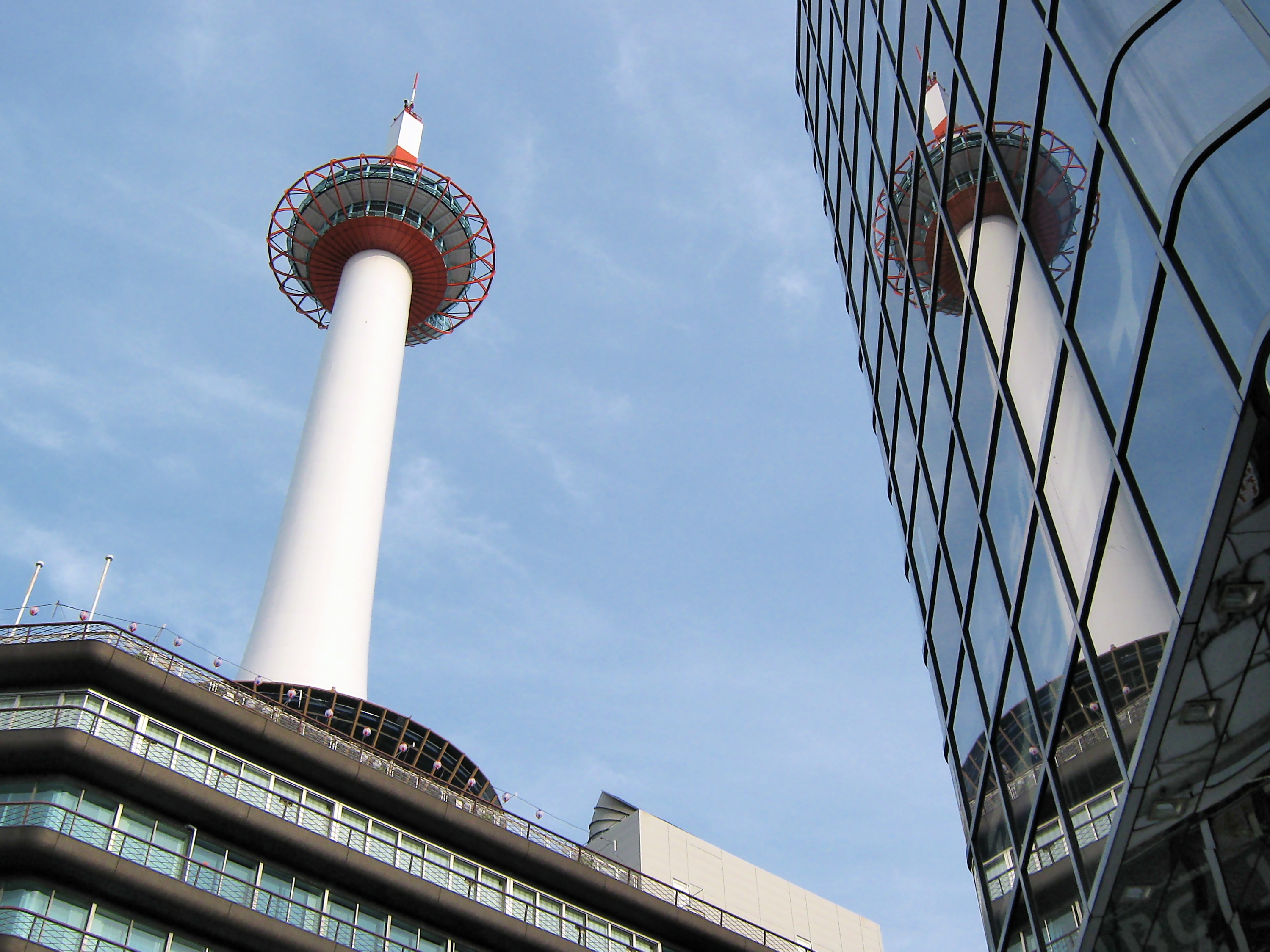
Kyoto Tower reflected in the north facade of Kyoto Station Apr/May 2009

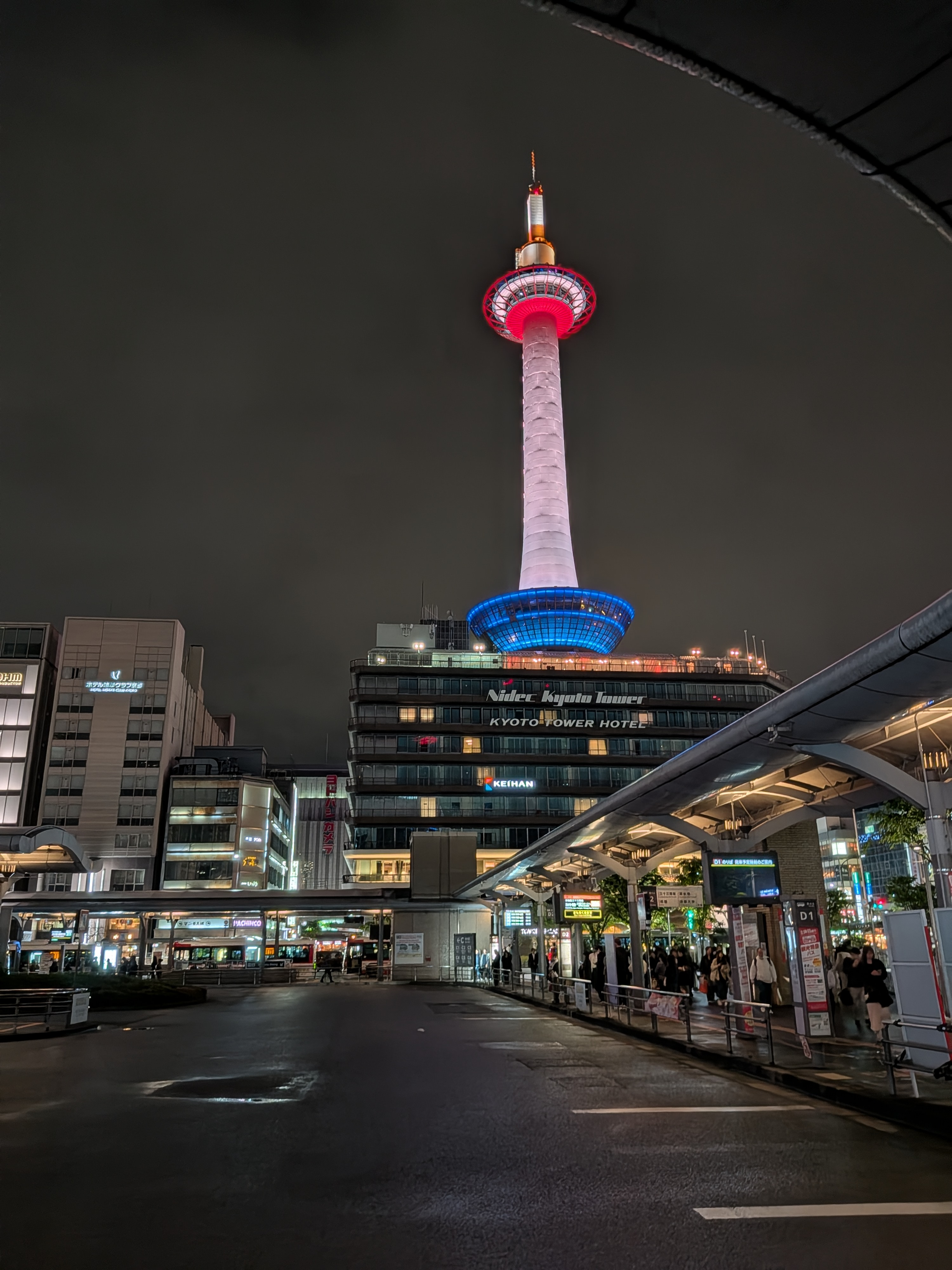
Night scene from Kyoto Station
April 2026

== See also ==
- List of towers
