= Valvrave the Liberator =

Japanese mecha anime and its franchise

- 革命機ヴァルヴレイヴ
- Genre: Mecha
- Created by: Sunrise
- Developed by: Ichirō Ōkouchi
- Directed by: Kō Matsuo
- Music by: Akira Senju
- Country of origin: Japan
- Original language: Japanese
- No. of seasons: 2
- No. of episodes: 24 (list of episodes)

Production
- Producers: Hiroomi Iketani; Toshihiro Maeda; Yōhei Shintaku
- Production companies: Sunrise; VVV Committee (Note: Label consisting of King Records, Aniplex, MBS, Sunrise, Bandai, Namco Bandai Games, Dentsu and Movic.); MBS

Original release
- Network: MBS, TBS, CBC TV, BS-TBS, HBC, RKB
- Release: April 12 – December 26, 2013

Related
Further information
Manga
| Written by | Karega Tsuchiya |
| Published by | Shueisha |
| Imprint | Jump Comics |
| Magazine | Jump SQ.19 |
| Original run | June 4, 2013 – December 19, 2013 |
| Volumes | 1 |
Light novel
| Written by | Yomoji Otono |
| Illustrated by | Yūgen |
| Published by | ASCII Media Works |
| Imprint | Dengeki Bunko |
| Magazine | Dengeki Hobby Magazine |
| Original run | August 2013 – March 2014 |
| Volumes | 3 |
Manga
Valvrave the Liberator: Uragiri no Rakuin
| Written by | Ichiya Sazanami |
| Published by | ASCII Media Works |
| Imprint | Sylph Comics |
| Magazine | Sylph |
| Original run | June 22, 2013 – January 22, 2014 |
| Volumes | 2 |
Manga
Valvrave the Liberator: Ryūsei no Valkyrie
| Written by | Yutaka Ōhori |
| Published by | ASCII Media Works |
| Imprint | Dengeki Comics Next |
| Magazine | Dengeki Daioh |
| Original run | June 27, 2013 – March 26, 2014 |
| Volumes | 2 |
Manga
Kakumei Club Valvra-bu
| Written by | Kanikama |
| Published by | ASCII Media Works |
| Imprint | Dengeki Comics EX |
| Magazine | Dengeki Daioh G |
| Original run | September 27, 2013 – April 28, 2014 |
| Volumes | 1 |
Light novel
Valvrave the Liberator: Undertaker
| Written by | Ryōji Kansai |
| Illustrated by | Sayaka Ono |
| Published by | ASCII Media Works |
| Magazine | Dengeki Hobby Magazine |
| Original run | November 2013 – March 2014 |
| Volumes | 7 |

Valvrave the Liberator (Japanese: 革命機ヴァルヴレイヴ, Hepburn: Kakumeiki Varuvureivu; lit. 'Revolution Machine Valvrave') is a Japanese mecha anime series produced by Sunrise. It is directed by Kō Matsuo and written by Ichirō Ōkouchi. The series is set in a futuristic date in which three factions divided from 70% of mankind are in war. It focuses on Haruto Tokishima, a high school student from the faction of JIOR who pilots one of the highly advanced weaponized mecha technology called the Valvrave to stop the Dorssian forces.

The series was broadcast for two seasons of twelve episodes each on MBS (Animeism block); the first season aired from April to June 2013, and the second season aired from October to December of the same year. The series was licensed in North America by Aniplex of America and was streamed with English subtitles by Crunchyroll and Hulu. The series has spawned four manga adaptations and two light novel series. Critical reception to the anime has been generally positive due to its delivery of conventional story elements often seen in the Gundam series alongside supernatural parts.

== Overview ==
=== Setting ===
The geopolitical status of the world during the era of Valvrave the Liberator

The story takes place in an unspecified future date, referred to as the 71st year of the True Era (真暦, Shinreki). Seventy percent of all human beings have migrated from Earth to other planets of the Solar System and a Dyson sphere, constructed around an artificial Sun. The world is divided between two superpowers called the Dorssia Military Pact Federation (ドルシア軍事盟約連邦, Dorushia Gunji Meiyaku Renpō) and the Atlantic Ring United States (環大西洋合衆国, Kan Taiseiyō Gasshūkoku) (ARUS), and a neutral nation called JIOR (ジオール, Jiōru), the Japan and Islands of Oceanian Republic, that has prospered economically. In the same year, the Dyson sphere, built by JIOR, is invaded by the Dorssian military forces.

=== Plot ===
Haruto Tokishima, a student from Sakimori High School living on the sphere's "Module 77", discovers a mysterious and powerful mecha called Valvrave (ヴァルヴレイヴ, Varuvureivu) and uses it to defend the module from a Dorssian invasion that takes over the rest of JIOR. However, after piloting it Haruto becomes an immortal who requires to feed on others. Once they learn that both Dorssia and the ARUS intend to claim the Valvrave for themselves, with no concern for their lives, the students of Sakimori High declare Module 77 an independent state and abandon JIOR territory. Soon after, several other Valvraves are found inside the school, and some of them are claimed by other students who join Haruto's fight to protect it. Once Haruto is approached by L-elf Karlstein, a Dorssian spy who claims to have the intentions to one day stage a revolution in his own country, both join forces in an unlikely alliance to secure the sovereignty of their new-found nation declared and officially recognized as New JIOR.

The commander of the Dorssia Military Pact Federation, Cain Dressel, eventually leads an invasion to Module 77 and steals the last Valvrave, being revealed as another immortal being like Haruto. Two months later, after Module 77 successfully arrives at the Moon, New JIOR starts receiving international support, albeit carefully overseen by the ARUS government. A group leaves the Moon en route to Earth, with Haruto resolving to locate the Valvrave creators and learn how to revert to becoming human once more before destroying the Valvraves himself. On Earth, Haruto learns the Valvrave absorbs the pilot's memories and will soon kill him. Nevertheless, he decides to keep piloting so that no other bears the burden. L-elf tries rescuing Dorssian princess Lieselotte, who explains to Haruto that a race known as Magius landed on Earth a few centuries ago and began possessing Earth's lifeforms in order to survive. As time passed they created an organization called the Council of One Hundred and One to conceal their existence from humanity while securing Runes for their survival.

After the group returns to Module 77 with the Valvrave's creators (but at the cost of Lieselotte's life) and the capture of Saki Rukino, the Council of One Hundred and One exposes the Valvrave's pilots' identities as immortals by using Saki. With this, ARUS starts gunning down the Module 77 students who expel Haruto from the Module so that the attacks will stop, resulting in Kyūma Inuzuka giving his life to save them and allow them to escape. However, Haruto, Saki, Raizō Yamada, Akira Renbōkoji and L-elf work with Dorssian agents A-drei, X-eins and royalist leader Kriemhild to reveal that the Dorssians are also immortals. In the aftermath, Haruto kills Cain in combat, but dies as a result of the Valvrave draining his memories. The series then moves to a future where the surviving Valvrave pilots are attempting to make peace with unknown life forms, while Haruto's childhood friend, Shōko Sashinami, becomes the pilot of Unit 1 to carry on Haruto's dream of coexistence.

== Production ==
In the making of the series, director Kō Matsuo wanted the mechas to look like strong human bodies. The team had difficulties in designing the Valvraves and were assisted by Nitroplus's Makoto Ishiwata. Each Valvrave also brought the team difficulties as they had to differentiate each. Cell animation was used to emphasize the 3D CG which helped make specific movements such as drawing a sword. The parts' size from the Valvrave's model data is regularly modified to emphasize more of their movements. Katsura Hoshino of D.Gray-man fame was hired as the character designer making it her first original work on an anime.

== Media ==
=== Anime ===
The anime series is produced by Sunrise. It is directed by Kō Matsuo, written by Ichirō Ōkouchi, and features original character designs by Katsura Hoshino. The series premiered on MBS (Animeism block) on April 12, 2013. The anime series has been licensed in North America by Aniplex of America and is Australia and New Zealand by Hanabee Entertainment. and is streamed with English subtitles by Crunchyroll and Hulu. The anime series ran for two seasons, with the second one having premiered in October 2013. Aniplex began releasing the series in Japan on Blu-ray and DVD volumes starting on June 26, 2013.

=== Manga ===
A manga adaptation of the series by Karega Tsuchiya premiered on June 4, 2013, in the July 2013 issue of Shueisha's Jump Square magazine and was serialized in Jump SQ.19 between June 19 and December 19, 2013. The series was collected in one volume, released on February 4, 2014.

A second manga authored by Ichiya Sazanami was serialized in ASCII Media Works' Sylph magazine between June 22, 2013, and January 11, 2014. Titled Uragiri no Rakuin (裏切りの烙印), the series focuses on Dorssia soldier A-drei. It has been collected in two tankōbon volumes, released on October 22, 2013, and February 22, 2014. Additionally, a manga focused on Valvrave pilot Saki Rukino, Ryūsei no Valkyrie (流星の乙女), written and illustrated by Yutaka Ōhori, was serialized ASCII Media Works' Dengeki Daioh magazine between June 27, 2013, and March 26, 2014. It has been collected in two tankōbon volumes, released on October 26, 2013, and May 27, 2014. A 4-panel manga spin-off by Kanikama, titled Kakumei Club Valvra-bu (革命倶楽部ヴァルヴレイ部) was serialized in ASCII Media Works' Dengeki Daioh G magazine between September 27, 2013, and April 28, 2014. The series has been collected in one tankōbon volume, released on May 27, 2014. A manga anthology was published by Square Enix on September 27, 2013.

=== Novels ===
A light novel adaptation started serialization in the July 2013 issue of ASCII Media Works' Dengeki Hobby Magazine. It is written by Yomoji Otono and illustrated by Yūgen. The series has also been published in three standalone volumes, released on August 10, 2013, November 9, 2013, and March 8, 2014. A second series, titled Valvrave the Liberator: Undertaker (革命機ヴァルヴレイヴ アンダー・テイカー), began serialization in Dengeki Hobby Magazine's November 2013 issue and ended in March 2014. The series is written by Ryōji Kansai and illustrated by Sayaka Ono.

== Reception ==
Valvrave the Liberator has received generally positive critical response by publications for anime and other media. The series has been remarked by Anime News Network's Theron Martin for its delivery of conventional story elements, life as seen from the point of view of teenagers, in a way not seen before. Martin also listed it as one of his guilty pleasures from 2013, comparing the execution of its story with Code Geass. While Valvrave has been compared with the Gundam franchise for its use of mechas and pilots by several writers, Kotaku's Richard Eisenbeis, it stands out for its "over-the-top" elements such as the Valvrave's curse which makes Haruto's act like a vampire as well as the multiple moves the mecha can perform. The second season has been noted for its darker episodes with Kestrel Swift from The Fandom Post addressing the multiple character deaths that gave the story a notable impact as well as the main cast going through major development after going through harsh events. The animation has also been praised for its presentation of violent scenes as well CGI during the Valvraves' fights. The character designs also received similar response.

On the other hand, the series has often received criticism. Dan Barnett from UK Anime Network that while the second episode onwards managed due to avoid making Valvrave similar to Gundam SEED as a result of its sci-fi elements, the series was so unpredictable it does not "seem to hold together particularly well as a whole." The series was also criticized for its lack of depth when examining several problems and early characterization. Moreover, Bamboo Dong from Anime News Network was highly critical to the way the plot explored a sexual assault on a character as if there were not negative implications to such act. Martin also commented on this and noted that while some viewers might find it intolerable, he praised the staff for not presenting it as a form of fanservice and that the consequences of such problem had yet to be seen.
