= Masahiro Yamada =

Masahiro Yamada may refer to:

- Masahiro Yamada (screenwriter) (山田 正弘, 1931–2005), Japanese screenwriter
- Masahiro Yamada (sociologist) (山田 昌弘, born 1957), Japanese sociologist
