= Kenji Yamada =

Kenji Yamada may refer to:

- Kenji Yamada (producer) (山田 兼司; born 1979), Japanese film and television producer
- Kenji Yamada (basketball) (山田 謙治; born 1983), Japanese basketball player
- Kenji Yamada (footballer) (山田 賢二; born 1989), Japanese footballer
- Kenji Yamada (judoka) (1924–2014), American judoka
- Kenji Yamada (politician) (山田 賢司; born 1966), Japanese Liberal Democratic representative for Hyōgo 7th district
