= Sachiko Yamada =

Sachiko Yamada may refer to:

- Sachiko Yamada (swimmer) (born 1982), Japanese Olympic swimmer
- Sachiko Yamada, pseudonym of Fusako Sano, a girl kidnapped in Niigata
