= Mamoru Yamada =

Japanese architect

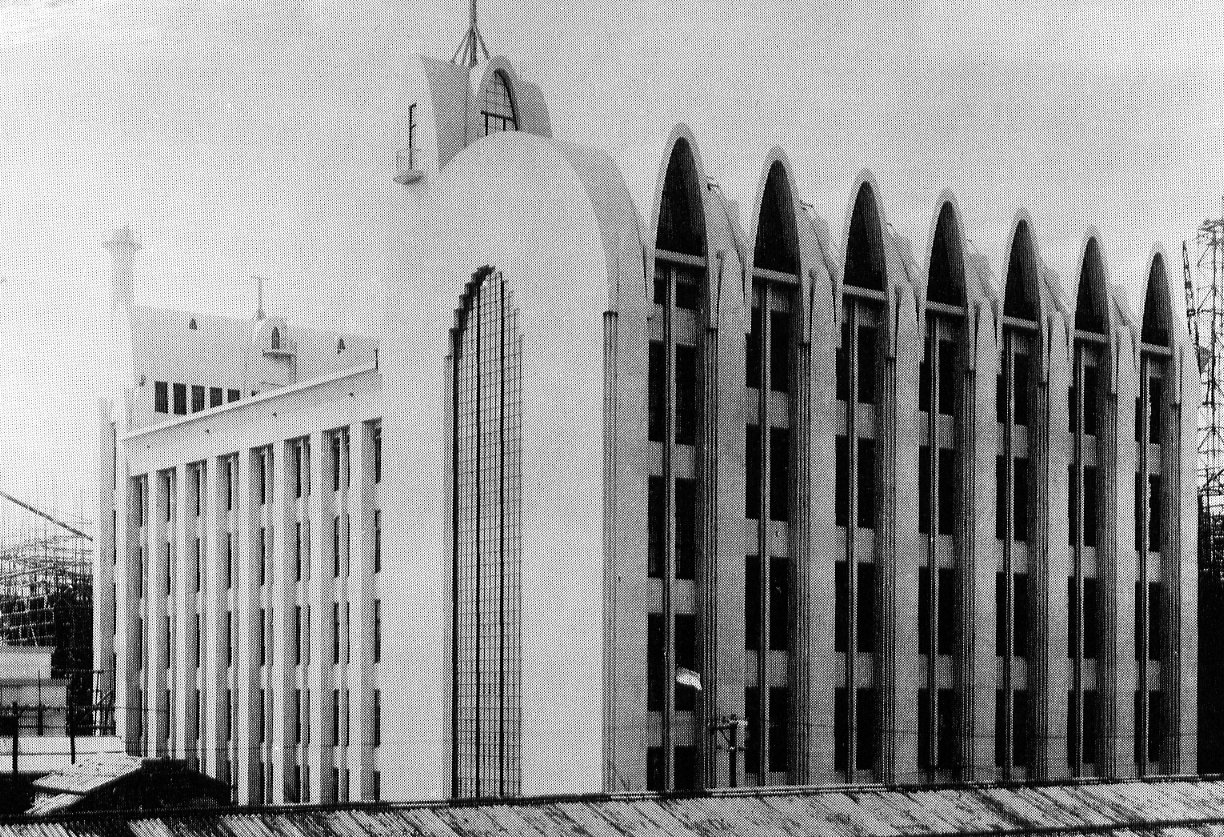
- Central Telegraph Office, Tokyo (destroyed)
- Born: 1894; Hashima, Gifu, Japan
- Died: 1966 (aged 71–72)
- Education: Tokyo Imperial University
- Occupation: Architect
- Buildings: Tokyo Central Telegraph Office Tokai University Shonan Building; Kyoto Tower Nippon Budokan

Mamoru Yamada (山田 守, Yamada Mamoru; 1894–1966) was a Japanese architect. He obtained an engineering degree from the Tokyo Imperial University school of architecture, and with other students formed the Japan Secession Group, the first promoters of modern architecture in Japan. Works included the 1926 Central Telegraph Office in Tokyo (destroyed). Later work included a number of structures associated with the 1964 Tokyo Olympics, including the Nippon Budokan (1964), Kyoto Tower (1964), as well as the Yamatokoriyama City Hall (1962)
