= Kenneth Yamada =

Kenneth Yamada is an American biologist at the National Institutes of Health and an Elected Fellow of the American Association for the Advancement of Science.

Dr. Yamada's research focuses on discovering novel mechanisms and regulators of cell interactions with the extracellular matrix and their roles in craniofacial development and disease.

Dr. Yamada has been elected a Fellow of the American Association for the Advancement of Science (AAAS) and the American Society for Cell Biology (ASCB). His contributions have earned him the inaugural Senior Investigator Award from the American Society for Matrix Biology and the British Society for Matrix Biology's gold medal.
