= Masaki Yamada =

Masaki Yamada may refer to:

- Masaki Yamada (musician) (山田 雅樹, born 1964), Japanese musician
- Masaki Yamada (writer) (山田 正紀, born 1950), Japanese writer
