= List of Valvrave the Liberator characters =

Some of the characters of the Valvrave the Liberator series. Clockwise from left: Haruto Tokishima, L-elf, Lieselotte W. Dorssia, A-drei, Q-vier, H-neun, X-eins, Kyūma Inuzuka, Raizo Yamada, Shoko Sashinami, Marie Nobi, Akira Renbokoji, and Saki Rukino.

Sunrise's anime series Valvrave the Liberator features several fictional characters designed by manga artist Katsura Hoshino. Set in the futuristic 71st Year of the True Calendar, the series follows Haruto Tokishima a high school student from the faction of JIOR who pilots an advanced mecha known as Valvrave 01 to defeat the hostile Dorssian forces invading his home. In order to defend themselves from the enemies who wish the Valvrave, Haruto's childhood friend Shoko Sashinami convinces her school mates to become an independent nation, the New JIOR. Across the fights against the Dorssia forces, Haruto gains new allies including the Dorssia agent L-elf who wishes to bring a revolution to his country, former idol Saki Rukino who becomes the Valvrave 04 pilot, school mates Kyūma Inuzuka and Raizo Yamada who wish to avenge their comrades using the Valvraves as well as the isolated girl Akira Renbokoji who becomes the final Valvrave pilot to protect Shoko.

== New JIOR ==
The New JIOR (新生ジオール, Shinsei Jiōru) is a nation composed of students from the former JIOR who are forced to become independent as the forces of Dorssia and ARUS are chasing them to obtain the mecha Valvrave. As the series progresses, it is revealed all the students were experimented from an early age to operate the machines and become immortals.

=== Haruto Tokishima ===
Haruto Tokishima (時縞 ハルト, Tokishima Haruto) is a high school student who always tries to avoid conflict, claiming that fighting is not the best way to deal with issues. He is thus displayed as an extremely kind hearted individual. During the Dorssian invasion, his friend Shoko presumably gets struck by a Dorssian mech, urging him to seek revenge with the mysterious humanoid weapon called the Valvrave. After learning that Shoko survived, he chooses not to declare his feelings for her, deeming himself unfit to be with her as a result of the Valvrave's effect on him. The Valvrave gives him a berserker state where he tries to bite other people and feed on their "Runes", their DNA. This curse also gives him special regenerative capabilities that allow him to survive wounds that could be fatal to ordinary humans, as well as the ability to transfer his consciousness into another person's body, by biting a person's bare skin, leaving his own body lying unconscious until he returns to it. The more Haruto pilots the Valvrave, the more memories he loses with the loss of all leading him to his death. Haruto's secret of his nature causes Shoko to sell him to Arus to negotiate for the lives of New JIOR students. Nevertheless, Haruto realizes he still cherishes mankind and agrees to work with L-elf to build a world where everyone including humans and Magius can live in peace. In revealing the truth behind the Magius, Haruto uses his last Runes in order to defeat Dorssia commander Cain Dressel. After L-elf admits that Haruto is his friend, he lightly taps L-elf's face, smiling to him as he dies. He is voiced by Ryōta Ōsaka in Japanese.

=== L-elf ===
L-elf (エルエルフ, Eruerufu; L11 in German), whose real name is Michael, is a secret agent of the Dorssian military. He is an excellent strategist and his innate ability to calculate possibilities has been referenced to be almost prophetic in nature. L-elf is known in ARUS as the "One Man Army" for having killed almost 5000 soldiers single-handedly. He always carries around a photo of the Dorssian Princess Lieselotte who had saved his life when he was younger, and has feelings for her. During Dorssia's invasion to Jior he tries to kill Haruto but the Valvrave's curse causes Haruto to possess his body. He is considered a traitor by Dorssia due to the actions Haruto commits while in control of his body, and is effectively stranded on Module 77. While claiming that he intends to bring about a revolution in Dorssia, he tries to convince Haruto to become his ally. Haruto accepts his offer and L-elf starts guiding the forces of New JIOR. When going to the Earth, L-elf tries to save Lieselotte from Dorssia but she dies in the fight against them. After learning Lieselotte was a Magius, L-elf agrees with Haruto to build a unified world where everyone including humans and Magius can live in peace. In the final episode, he admits that Haruto is his friend just before the latter dies, he is later seen in the epilogue during Satomi and Takahi's wedding party wearing an imperial cloth. He is voiced by Ryōhei Kimura in Japanese.

=== Shoko Sashinami ===
Shoko Sashinami (指南 ショーコ, Sashinami Shoko) is the daughter of the prime minister of JIOR, and is Haruto's childhood friend and crush. She is extremely kindhearted and loyal to her friends. She seems to reciprocate Haruto's feelings for her, but his confession to her is interrupted by the Dorssian invasion, and her presumed death is the reason for Haruto to pilot the Valvrave. With the rest of the country under Dorssia's control and following ARUS's betrayal, she convinces the other students to establish the Sakimori Academy's module as an independent state called New JIOR, using the Valvrave as leverage against both superpowers. She is elected as the first Prime Minister of New JIOR. After she finds out Haruto's secret, she sells L-Elf and him to ARUS to negotiate for their lives, as she no longer trusts him. However, she quickly learns from Pino that the reason Haruto turned into a Kamitsuki was to avenge her presumed death back in Episode 1, bursting into tears upon the revelation. She deeply grieves over Haruto's death, but still tries to look strong for the sake of her citizens. In the epilogue, she eventually becomes an immortal and replaces Haruto as the new pilot of Valvrave 01, and has had a 'Memorial Core' built, with statues of those who died to create their new home. She is voiced by Asami Seto in Japanese.

=== Saki Rukino ===
Saki Rukino (流木野 サキ, Rukino Saki) is a popular idol who has grown aloof due to her career being on hold, due to her being cold and that she hates dealing with other people. She develops feelings for Haruto but is jealous of his friendship with Shoko. After discovering the Valvrave hangar beneath Sakimori Academy, she excitedly pilots the Valvrave Four (coded VVVIV), to which she names "Carmilla", after being injected with the same substance as Haruto. 200 years in the future Saki is still a Valvrave pilot fighting an unknown enemy and remembers her promise with Haruto to not give up no matter what. During this time she is often seen talking with the young Prince, telling him stories about the Magius War. She is also the protagonist of the manga Ryūsei no Valkyrie which explores her role in the series as well as her backstory. She is voiced by Haruka Tomatsu in Japanese.

=== Kyūma Inuzuka ===
Kyūma Inuzuka (犬塚 キューマ, Inuzuka Kyūma) is a high school senior and a very dependable upperclassman for Haruto and his classmates. He is constantly thinking about ways to make money and hopes to become a very rich man in the future. Kyuma is one of Haruto's friends at school and one of the first to witness Haruto's power. After learning of Aina's death, he becomes a Valvrave pilot in order to avenge her. Later on, he dies by sacrificing himself to protect the escaping students during the massacre, even though they called him and his comrades monsters and tried to kill them. He is voiced by Yūki Ono in Japanese.

=== Aina Sakurai ===
Aina Sakurai (櫻井 アイナ, Sakurai Aina) is a very caring but extremely shy freshman at Sakimori Academy. She is able to connect with Saki, despite the latter normally isolating herself from the other students. Aina is another friend of Haruto's and one of the first to learn about his power. She is killed in the cross fire between Q-vier and L-elf, while hiding in the Valvrave hangar. She is voiced by Ai Kayano in Japanese.

=== Marie Nobi ===
Marie Nobi (野火 マリエ, Nobi Marie) is Shoko's best friend. Contrary to her childish appearance, Marie is very emotionally mature and is never afraid of letting others know her opinions. She suffers from amnesia and has no recall of any memories beyond two years in the past. Her amnesia is the direct result of the Pino AI consuming the Runes of her memories during the early stages of Project VVV where she had been used as a test pilot for the Valvrave I. Marie's Runes are capable of greatly amplifying the Valvrave I's abilities. She eventually dies after using too much Runes when using Valvrave I during a battle. She is voiced by Misato Fukuen in Japanese.

=== Yusuke Otamaya ===
Yusuke Otamaya (霊屋 ユウスケ, Otamaya Yūsuke) is the leader of the Boys' Cultural Club. He is extremely knowledgeable about the mechanics of machines and physics making others consider him a bit of a nerd. He and Raizo work together to fix the climate controls in Module 77. He is voiced by Hiroyuki Yoshino in Japanese.

=== Raizo Yamada ===
Raizo Yamada (山田 ライゾウ, Yamada Raizō) is the academy delinquent. He is nicknamed Thunder (サンダー, Sandā) by the gang of misfits that he leads. He has a short temper, but cares about his friends. He helps Yusuke fix the climate controls in Module 77. He becomes a Valvrave pilot in order to avenge his friend. During season 2, Yamada works with Haruto, Akira, Saki and L-elf to expose the nature of the Magius. Yamada is killed protecting Akira in a one-on-one duel with Dorssia soldier Q-vier. He is voiced by Yūichi Nakamura in Japanese.

=== Satomi Renbokoji ===
Satomi Renbokoji (連坊小路 サトミ, Renbōkoji Satomi) is the president of the student council of Sakimori Academy and brother of Akira. He demonstrates an elite disposition, but is usually helpless in crisis situations. He was pressured by his parents to pass an exam to get into one of the best national schools. When Akira was discovered to have hacked into the exam database and later suffered extensive bullying because of it, he distanced himself from her. Later in life, he tries to atone for this by being over-protective of Akira. He marries Takahi, as seen in the epilogue. He was believed to have appeared in the futuristic scenario, but this was later revealed to be his descendant. He is voiced by Daisuke Namikawa in Japanese.

=== Takahi Ninomiya ===
Takahi Ninomiya (二宮 タカヒ, Ninomiya Takahi) is a senior and the leader of the Girls' Sports Club at Sakimori Academy. She is very proud of being named Miss Sakimori for the last 2 school years. She can be an overbearing rich-girl at times. She is married to Satomi, as seen in the epilogue. She is voiced by Minako Kotobuki in Japanese.

=== Akira Renbokoji ===
Akira Renbokoji (連坊小路 アキラ, Renbōkoji Akira) is a shy but skilled hacker that operates several computers concealed by cardboard boxes in a hidden area in the academy and is essentially a hikikomori. In the past she was bullied in middle school after she was caught hacking the computer systems for the prestigious academy that her brother, Satomi took the entrance exam for so that he could be admitted. This led to her current lifestyle and fearing the outside world. She is the one that posts the video of Haruto initially piloting the Valvrave onto the WIRED Network. After overcoming her past fears and embracing her new friendship with Shoko, she becomes the pilot of Unit 6. In the epilogue, she is seen talking to the Prince and Saki. She is voiced by Aoi Yūki in Japanese.

=== Takumi Kibukawa ===
Takumi Kibukawa (貴生川 タクミ, Kibukawa Takumi) is a physics instructor at Sakimori Academy, but because of his aloof attitude towards everything and extremely casual tone, many find it difficult to see him as a member of the faculty. He seems to know one of the scientists who had worked on the Valvrave program. He later reveals that he and the rest of the staff at the academy (with the exception of Rion Nanami) and the adults of Module 77 were JIOR soldiers. He is voiced by Wataru Hatano in Japanese.

=== Rion Nanami ===
Rion Nanami (七海 リオン, Nanami Rion) is a teacher at Sakimori Academy. She is bit of an air-head at times and is the only member of the faculty not involved with the Valvrave project. Her sweet personality and attractive physical features makes her popular among the male students. She is voiced by Yui Horie in Japanese.

=== Others ===
- Iori Kitagawa (北川 イオリ, Kitagawa Iori) is the Sakimori Academy student council vice-president. She is voiced by Kiyono Yasuno in Japanese.
- Juto Banjo (番匠 ジュート, Banjo Jūto). He is voiced by Hiroyuki Takanaka in Japanese.
- Eri Watari (亘理 エリ, Watari Eri). She is voiced by Asami Sanada in Japanese.
- Lily Yamamoto (山元 リリィ, Yamamoto Ririi). She is voiced by Haruka Kimura in Japanese.
- Youhei Onai (女井 ヨウヘイ, Onai Youhei) is a Sakimori student. He was killed when Jeffery Anderson ordered the massacre of all of the Module 77 inhabitants. He is voiced by Ryota Asari in Japanese.
- Seiya Kamisugi (上杉 セイヤ, Kamisugi Seiya) is one of Yusuke's friends. He is voiced by Shigeyuki Susaki in Japanese.
- Toru Miyamachi (宮町 トオル, Miyamachi Tooru) is another of Yusuke's friends. He is voiced by Takuya Masumoto in Japanese.
- Midori Akaishi (赤石 ミドリ, Akaishi Midori). She is voiced by Chika Anzai in Japanese.
- Nobuteru Kazemoto (風本 ノブテル, Kazemoto Nobuteru). Raizo's deceased friend.

== JIOR ==
=== Ryuuji Sashinami ===
Ryuuji Sashinami (指南 リュージ, Sashinami Ryūji) is the Prime Minister of JIOR and Shoko's father. He is sentenced to death by the Dorssian 54th Military Tribunal for deceiving the nations on the JIOR's neutrality in the war, while covertly enabling the Valvrave Project. He is later threatened by Admiral Wartenberg in order for Shoko to turn over the Valvraves to the Dorssians and is subsequently killed when the Valvrave One destroys the Dorssian blockade on Module 77's way to the Moon. He was killed along with the Dorssian fleet from an attack by Haruto for the safety of Module 77, whom Shoko hesitated regarding his safety. He is voiced by Takaya Kuroda in Japanese.

=== Soichi Tokishima ===
Soichi Tokishima (時縞 ソウイチ, Tokishima Souichi) is Haruto's father and the leader of the VVV project. He has not been in contact with his son for a long time due to his experiments. Soichi grew a god complex while experimenting with his son to be the following step in human evolution causing great dismay to Haruto. He is voiced by Toshihiko Seki in Japanese.

=== Mitsutoshi Kitagawa ===
Mitsutoshi Kitagawa (北川 ミツトシ, Kitagawa Mitsutoshi) is Iori's father and one of the scientists working on the VVV Project. He was killed by the Magius after having his Runes extracted from his body inside a Phantom Ship. He is voiced by Susumu Chiba in Japanese.

== Dorssia Military Pact Federation ==
=== A-drei ===
A-drei (アードライ, Ādorai; A3 in German) is a Dorssian agent with a strong rivalry with L-elf. He loses his left eye after being shot by L-elf who had been possessed by Haruto at the time, and has it replaced with an artificial one. Despite appearing to have been betrayed by L-elf, A-drei still tries to understand L-elf's explanation for his actions. Although the two do not make up, A-drei holds respect for L-elf, remembering the lessons he taught him as a kid. In the Second Season, he returns to the Dorssia territory on the ground with Cain and his friends. He went to his former hometown of Karlstein in collaboration with the Army to search for Haruto and others who also landed on the ground, and discovered the operation of L-elf. After being caught in a cave-in, he works with a child soldier, K-zwölf (whose contents are Saki). Eventually, A-drei decides to join L-elf's revolution. He also appears as the protagonist of the manga Uragiri no Rakuin where the anime's story is seen from his point of view. He is voiced by Jun Fukuyama in Japanese.

=== H-neun ===
H-neun (ハーノイン, Hānoin; H9 in German) is a Dorssian agent. He has a bright and violent personality. He is a mood maker of troops, although he can be easily provoked. Across the series, he discovers Cain's true nature and decides to investigate him suspecting him not to be the man he used to serve. After Cain discovers him, the Dorssia soldiers are informed H-neun betrayed them and was executed. He has 4 earrings, each representing the color of the hair of his team. They are found by X-eins who betrays Cain when learning of the truth behind H-neun's death. He is voiced by Mamoru Miyano in Japanese.

=== X-eins ===
X-eins (イクスアイン, Ikusuain; X1 in German) is a Dorssian agent. He is highly respectful of his boss Cain. X-eins is a skilled tactician, able to find weaknesses in an enemy after only observing it in battle once developing countermeasures for future battles. He is good friends with H-neun and is visibly disturbed after hearing of his betrayal and death. Upon receiving H-neun's earring, he hears a recording of the moment when Cain was about to kill H-neun and learns of Cain's true nature. After A-drei frees Valvrave pilot Saki Rukino, X-eins joins him and L-elf in revealing the nature of the Magius. He dies while fighting his former superior Cain. He is voiced by Yoshimasa Hosoya in Japanese.

=== Q-vier ===
Q-vier (クーフィア, Kūfia; Q4 in German) is a Dorssian agent. He is a young, radical boy who enjoys war as if it were a game and does not hesitate to kill. He looks for any opportunity to fight or kill to the point that he would disobey his superior and even to the point he would kill members of his team as soon as they are shown to be betrayers. Unlike other Dorssia soldiers, he is overjoyed with L-elf's betrayal as he uses it as an excuse to kill him. During JIOR's mission to reveal the nature of the Magius, he kills Raizo in a one-on-one duel while attempting to kill Akira, but is finally killed by A-drei while trying to fight Unit 04. He is voiced by Yūki Kaji in Japanese.

=== Cain Dressel ===
Cain Dressel (カイン・ドレッセル, Kain Doresseru) is the commander of the Dorssia Military Pact Federation's space forces and the main antagonist of the series. He is L-Elf's trainer. When attacking New JIOR personally, it is revealed he has been an immortal Magius for 10 years, having a glowing mark on his neck identifying him as a Magius. He then later uses Prue in order to take and pilot the VVV-2. Due to his lack of values of companionship, his subordinate H-neun suspects he is not the real man based on his advice. He is killed in combat by Valvrave pilot Haruto Tokishima. He is voiced by Daisuke Ono in Japanese.

=== Kriemhild ===
Kriemhild (クリムヒルト, Kurimuhiruto) is Cain's aide. She has come to question Cain's actions after not reporting L-elf's defection. She and H-Nuen are shown to have a secret partnership. She is later revealed to be a royalist and assists L-elf and JIOR students on Earth. She later takes part in the royalists' coup during the finale. She is voiced by Nana Mizuki in Japanese.

=== Lieselotte W. Dorssia ===
Lieselotte W. Dorssia (リーゼロッテ・W・ドルシア, Rīzerotte Daburyū Dorushia) is the princess of Dorssia. She saved L-elf's life when he was a child. Despite L-elf's desire to save her, Lieselotte believes she does not belong with him as a result to the fact she is a Magius. Nevertheless, when L-elf goes to save her with the New JIOR members, she agrees to go with him. She dies by running out of Runes when she fixes rocket that was used by Haruto and his friends to escape from Dorssiana. She is voiced by Aki Toyosaki in Japanese.

=== Amadeus K. Dorssia ===
Amadeus K. Dorssia (アマデウス・K・ドルシア, Amadeusu Kei Dorushia) is the Führer of Dorssia. He is taken over by Mirko, a Magius member of the 101st Council, a group of Magiuses whose goal is to conceal the existence of the Magius from the world. He rules Dorssia by promoting its military strength and using underhand political maneuvers to manipulate the public perspective, such as the time when he presents the Phantom, a Dorssian vessel that drains the life force out of people to be used as Rune energy, as a secret laboratory for Module 77 while hiding in the hangar of Module 77. He is exposed to the world as a Magius which causes him to be interrogated and imprisoned or executed for his crimes. He is voiced by Takehito Koyasu in Japanese.

=== Others ===
- Manninger (マニンガー, Maningā). He is voiced by Kunpei Sakamoto in Japanese.
- Aurelia (アウレリア, Aureria) is Manninger's aide. She is voiced by Yūka Hirose in Japanese.
- Delius Wartenberg (デリウス・バーテンベルク, Deriusu Bātenberuku). He is voiced by Katsuyuki Konishi in Japanese.
- K-zwölf (カーツベルフ, Kātsuberufu). He is voiced by Michiko Kaiden in Japanese.
- F-sechs (エフゼクス, Efuzekusu). He is voiced by Daisuke Hirakawa in Japanese.

== Atlantic Ring United States — ARUS ==
=== Figaro ===
Figaro (フィガロ, Figaro) is a senator of ARUS. He claims that he would help the students evacuate but he is only interested in Valvrave and attempts to abandon the students of Sakimori in order to secure Valvrave. He is then forced to work alongside the Sakimori students when his plans are revealed. He is killed when his ship comes under attack by Q-Vier's Ideal Mecha. He is voiced by Koji Yusa in Japanese.

=== Jeffery Anderson ===
Jeffrey Anderson (ジェフリー・アンダーソン, Jefurī Andāson) is the president of the Atlantic Ring United States. He is aware of the Magius. Although there are plans for ARUS to accept the members from New JIOR, the revelation that its members are Magius-like beings results in him ordering the slaughter of them. During the battle with Cain, he exposes the Magius to the world, sparking uprisings against them and allowing humankind to regain control of their society. He is voiced by Taketora in Japanese.

=== Burnett ===
Burnett (バーネット, Bānetto) is a journalist of the Atlantic Ring United States. He is voiced by Shuhei Sakaguchi in Japanese.

=== Eileen ===
Eileen (アイリーン, Airīn) is Burnett's assistant. She is voiced by Naoko Sugiura in Japanese.

== Valvrave OS Avatar ==
=== Pino ===
Pino (ピノ, Pino) is the operating system of Valvrave 01. She is a cheerful looking girl, during the first season's finale, it is revealed that she has the ability to speak like a normal human while being mute during the majority of season one. It is revealed that she is the one who takes over Haruto's body to attack other people so he can consumes the Runes as the main power for the Valvraves. She is Prue's younger sister, the OS of Valvrave 02. She is voiced by Ai Kayano in Japanese.

=== Prue ===
Prue (プルー, Purū) is the operating system of Valvrave 02. Unlike his younger sister Pino, Prue can be easily provoked, he also seems to hate humans, who made him trapped in the Valvrave's engine. He is finally reunited with Pino after Valvrave 02 is destroyed by Haruto. He is voiced by Tsubasa Yonaga in Japanese.

== The Royal Family of the Third Galactic Empire ==
=== The Prince ===
The Prince (皇子, Ouji) is the royal Prince of the Third Galactic Empire and only so far appears in the futuristic scenes. A young boy, he is often seen with talking to Saki, telling him stories about the Magius War. His physical appearance is startlingly similar to Haruto and L-elf. It is hinted in the novels that he is the son of Shoko and L-elf . He is voiced by Yui Horie in Japanese.

== Valvrave the Liberator: Undertaker ==
The following characters appear in the spin-off light novel, Valvrave the Liberator: Undertaker.

- Jin Hinomoto (陽本 ジン, Hinomoto Jin) is the protagonist of the sidestory novel, Valvrave the Liberator: Undertaker. He feels jealousy towards his classmate Haruto for his ability to control the Valvrave. Becomes the pilot of a Kagerou, a unit based on Valvrave II, and later of Valvrave VII becoming a Kamitsuki.
- Nao Ota (於保多 ナオ, Oota Nao) is the heroine of Undertaker. A beautiful and popular second year student who lacks confidence in herself. Pilots a Kagerou, and later Valvrave II2 becoming a Kamitsuki.
- Goh Nijikawa (虹河 ゴウ, Nijikawa Gou) is Jin's childhood friend and part of the Valvrave maintenance crew.
- Infigal (インフィガール, Infigāru) is an Dorssian ensign. He leads the Freikugel (フライクーゲル, Furaikūgeru) squad and specializes in the assassination of ARUS VIPs. He pilots a custom WAFFE known as the "WAFFE GIGANT," and eventually of the Wurm Oben.
- Fadar (ファダー, Fadā) is brigadier general in the Dorssian army who has known Infigal for a long time. Pilots the Wurm Unten.

== Reception ==
The cast of Valvrave has been compared with the stereotypes often seen in other anime series with Anime News Network's Theron Martin noting that some could be breakouts such as Haruto who approves the death of enemy pilots. Similarly, while Kotaku writer Richard Einbens found the cast to be composed of stereotypes commonly seen in lighthearted series the way they experience harsh events such as wars makes the series entertaining to watch.
