= List of animated television series of 2011 =

This is a list of animated television series first aired in 2011.

Animated television series to air first in 2011
Title	Seasons	Episodes	Country	Year	Original channel	Technique
1001 Nights	2	52	Canada	2011–12	Teletoon	Flash
The 99	2	52	United Kingdom	2011–12	The Hub (planned)	CGI
Abadas	1	52	United Kingdom	2011–12	CBeebies (Target Ent. appointed exclusive global deals only)	Flash
ABC Monsters	1	26	Malaysia; Spain	2011	TV2	Flash
The Adventures of Abney & Teal	2	52	United Kingdom	2011–12	CBeebies	Flash/CGI
Allen Gregory	1	7	United States	2011	Fox	Flash
Almost Naked Animals	3	52	Canada	2011–13	YTV	Flash
The Amazing World of Gumball	6	240	United Kingdom; United States; Germany; Ireland (season 1)	2011–19	Cartoon Network	Flash; Traditional; CGI; Stop motion Live action
Ana la Rana			Uruguay	2011	TNU	Flash
Anima TV	1	17	Brazil	2011	TV Brasil	Flash
Anyuan Xiaozi	1	26	China	2011		
Art Odyssey	2	52	South Korea	2011–13	EBS	
Ask Lara	1	26	Spain	2011	Pakapaka	Flash
Baby Jake	2	52	United Kingdom	2011–12	CBeebies	Flash
Bananas in Pyjamas (2011)	3	156	Australia	2011–13	ABC2	CGI
The Barkers	15	247	Russia	2011–present	Russia-1, Carousel	CGI
The Basketeers	2	52	France	2011–14	M6	Traditional
Bob's Burgers	15	298	United States	2011–present	Fox	Flash (season 1)/Toon Boom (other seasons)
BoBoiBoy	3	52	Malaysia	2011–16	TV3	CGI
Bubble Guppies	6	129	Canada; United States	2011–23	Nickelodeon	CGI
Bummi	1	26	Germany	2011–14	KI.KA	Flash
Buru & Forest Friends	1	26	South Korea	2011	KBS2	
Canimals	2	109	South Korea	2011–15	EBS; ITV (CITV) (United Kingdom)	CGI/Live action
Carrapatos e Catapultas	3	39	Brazil	2011–18	TV Brasil	Flash
Chaplin & Co	1	104	France; India	2011–12	France 3	CGI
Chicken Town	1	39	France	2011	Canal+ Family	CGI
China, IL	3	30	United States	2011–15	Adult Swim	Flash
Chuck Vanderchuck's "Something Something" Explosion!			United States	2011	PBSKidsGo.org	Flash
Cille	5	66	Turkey	2011–19	TRT Çocuk	CGI
Clanners			Spain	2011–12	Clan	CGI
Los Colorados	1	13	Panama	2011	SerTV	Flash
Crash Canyon	2	26	Canada	2011–13	Teletoon at Night	Flash
Dan Vs.	3	53	United States	2011–13	The Hub	Flash
The DaVincibles	1	52	Australia; Italy; United States	2011	Seven Network; Rai 2	Flash
DC Nation Shorts		162	United States	2011–14	Cartoon Network	Flash
Detentionaire	4	53	Canada	2011–14	Teletoon	Flash
Dipdap	1	52	United Kingdom	2011	CBeebies	Flash
Dixiland	2	52	Italy	2011	Rai Yoyo	Flash
Dosis de Familia	4		Venezuela	2011–15		CGI
Dr. Raio X	1	13	Brazil	2011–12	TV Rá-Tim-Bum	Flash
Dr. W		78	Spain	2011	Super3	CGI
Dream Defenders	1	26	Singapore	2011	3net	CGI
Ella Bella Bingo	3	105	Singapore; Norway	2011–14	NRK Super	Flash
Eori	2	52	Malaysia; South Korea	2011–15	KBS2, KBS1	
Fish n' Chips	1	52	France	2011–12	Gulli	CGI
Fleabag Monkeyface	1	52	United Kingdom; Singapore	2011–12	CITV	CGI
FloopaLoo, Where Are You?	2	104	France	2011–14	Canal+ Family, Télétoon+, France 5	Flash
Franklin and Friends	2	52	Canada	2011–13	Treehouse TV	CGI
Gaspard and Lisa	2	51	France; United Kingdom	2011–13	CITV	CGI
Glumpers	2	104	Spain	2011	Super3	CGI
Good Vibes	1	12	United States	2011	MTV	Flash
Green Lantern: The Animated Series	1	26	United States	2011–13	Cartoon Network	CGI
The Green Squad	1	52	France	2011	France 5	Flash
Grenadine & Peppermint	3	78	France	2011	TF1	Flash
Guardians of the Power Masks	1	26	United States; China; South Korea	2011	KBS2	Traditional
Guess How Much I Love You	2	78	Singapore; Australia; Canada	2011–16	Disney Junior	Flash
Gustavs Welt	2	60	Germany	2011–12	Super RTL	
Hello Jadoo	5	95	South Korea	2011–23	SBS TV	Traditional
Hip-Hip and Hurrah	2	26	Poland	2011–13	Kino Polska	Flash
Hippothesis	1	20	Canada	2011	TVOKids; Knowledge KIds	Flash
Hostal Morrison	2	26	Chile	2011–13	Canal 13 (season 1); Chilevisión (season 2)	Flash
Iconicles	1	26	United Kingdom; United States	2011	CBeebies	Flash; CGI; Live action
L'Illa del far	1	13	Spain	2011	Super3	Flash
Inanimate Insanity	4	60	United States	2011–present	YouTube	Flash
Inner Ranger	1	3	South Korea	2011	EBS	CGI
Jack	3	39	Canada	2011–14	TVOKids	CGI
Jake and the Never Land Pirates	4	115	United States	2011–16	Disney Junior	Traditional (seasons 1-3), Flash (season 4)
Japanoschlampen		43	Germany	2011–21	einsfestival, YouTube	Flash
Jelly Jamm	2	78	Spain; United Kingdom	2011–13	Cartoonito (pan-European); Clan	CGI
Jokebox	1	13	Spain	2011–12	TV3	CGI
The Jungle Bunch: News Beat	1	26	France	2011	France 3	CGI
Justin Time	3	78	Canada	2011–16	Disney Junior; Netflix (Series 3)	CGI
Keymon Ache	1	164	India	2011	Nickelodeon	Flash
Der kleine Ritter Trenk	2	26	Germany	2011–12	KI.KA	Traditional
Köstebekgiller	1	13	Turkey	2011	TRT Çocuk	CGI
Kung Fu Panda: Legends of Awesomeness	3	80	United States	2011–16	Nickelodeon, Nicktoons	CGI
Larva	6	332	South Korea	2011–present	KBS1; JEI TV; Netflix	CGI
The LeBrons	3		United States	2011–14	YouTube	Traditional (season 1), CGI (seasons 2–3)
The Legend of Luo Xiaohei		40	China	2011–2021	Bilibili	Flash
Little Baby Bum			United Kingdom	2011–present	YouTube	CGI
Little Charley Bear	4	52	United Kingdom	2011–15	CBeebies	CGI
The Looney Tunes Show	2	52	United States	2011–13	Cartoon Network	Traditional/CGI
Lucky Fred	2	104	Spain, Italy (season 1), Philippines (season 1), Ireland (season 2), India (season 2)	2011–14	Disney Channel	Flash
Lucky!	1	68	Russia	2011	Tvidi, Carousel	Flash
Luzarii de pe Electrolizei	6	137	Romania	2011–present	Trilulilu, YouTube	
Magic Han War	2	52	South Korea	2011–15	MBC TV	CGI
La Mansión de los Políticos	2	36	Paraguay	2011–12	Trece	Flash
Marathon Prince	1	52	China	2011	CCTV	Traditional
Masameer			Saudi Arabia	2011	YouTube	Flash
Matt Hatter Chronicles	4	52	United Kingdom; Canada	2011–15	Nicktoons; CITV; Teletoon; TRTÉ (Ireland)	CGI
Mickey's Mousekersize	1	10	United States	2011	Disney Junior	CGI
Mickey's World Record Animals	1	10	Italy	2011	Disney Junior	CGI
Mike the Knight	3	130	Canada; United Kingdom	2011–17	Treehouse TV (Canada), CBeebies (UK)	CGI
Minnie's Bow-Toons	9	120	United States	2011–present	Disney Junior	CGI
Mole's World	3	156	China	2011–13		
Mongo Wrestling Alliance	1	10	United States	2011	Adult Swim	Flash/CGI
Mouk	2	104	France	2011	France 5	Flash
My Friend Grompf	1	52	France	2011	France 3	Flash
My Magic Pet Morphle	2	324	Netherlands, United Kingdom	2011–present	YouTube	Flash (2011–22)/Traditional (2021)/CGI (since 2022)
Ninjago	15	210	Canada, Denmark	2011–22	Cartoon Network	CGI
Novators	3	53	Russia	2011–15	Carousel	Traditional
Off the Air	14	52	United States	2011–24	Adult Swim	CGI
Oh Noah!	1	14	United States	2011–13	PBSKidsGo.org	Flash
Olive the Ostrich	1	17	United Kingdom	2011	Nick Jr.	Flash
Olly the Little White Van	6	78	United Kingdom	2011–13	CITV	CGI
Om Nom Stories	29	288	Russia; United Kingdom	2011–present	YouTube	Flash; Live action (seasons 1–2)
Ori-Princess	5	208	China	2011	CCTV-14	Traditional
Pada Zaman Dahulu	6	168	Malaysia	2011–present	TV Alhijrah	CGI
Pet Squad	1	52	United Kingdom; Canada	2011	CBBC	Flash
Pixi Wissen TV		27	Germany	2011–12	Nickelodeon	CGI
Plankton Invasion	1	78	France	2011–14	Canal+ Family	CGI
Plim Plim	3	60	Argentina	2011–16	Disney Junior	Flash
A Poem Is...	2	22	United States	2011–13	Disney Junior	Live action/Traditional/CGI
Pok & Mok	1	78	France	2011	Canal+	Flash
Pom Pom and Friends	1	78	South Korea	2011	EBS	CGI
PopPixie	1	52	Italy	2011	Rai 2	Flash/Traditional
Poppy Cat	2	104	United Kingdom	2011–16	Nick Jr.	Flash
The Problem Solverz	2	26	United States	2011–13	Cartoon Network (2011); Netflix (2013)	Flash
Punky	2	40	Ireland	2011–present	RTÉ Two	Flash
The Qpiz	1	52	Italy	2011	Rai 2, Rai Gulp	Flash
Quiz Time	1	52	France	2011–12	Disney Junior	Flash
Qumi-Qumi	3	21	Russia; Cyprus	2011–19	NTV; STS (2013–14); 2x2 (2011–14); Karusel (2012–present); Tlum HD (2016–19); Ryzhy; Multik HD (2017–19); Ani (2019–present); TiJi (2017–19)	Flash (season 1); CGI (seasons 2–3)
Raa Raa the Noisy Lion	3	78	United Kingdom	2011–18	CBeebies	Stop motion
Rainbow Sea	1	26	China	2011–12	CCTV-14	
Rastamouse	3	104	United Kingdom	2011–15	CBeebies	Stop motion
Rated A for Awesome	1	26	Canada	2011–12	YTV	CGI
Red Caps	1	26	Italy	2011	Rai Gulp	Traditional
Redakai: Conquer the Kairu	2	52	France; Canada	2011–13	Canal J Gulli; YTV	Traditional
Rekkit Rabbit	3	104	France	2011–13	TF1	Flash
Robocar Poli	5	120	South Korea	2011–22	EBS1	CGI
RObotzi	5	112	Romania	2011–present	YouTube	
Ronaldinho Gaucho's Team	1	52	Italy	2011	DeA Kids	Flash/Traditional
Rosie	2	180	France	2011–14	Gulli	Flash
Scaredy Squirrel	3	52	Canada	2011–13	YTV	Flash/Toon Boom
Secret Millionaires Club	1	26	United States; China	2011–14	The Hub	Flash
Secret Mountain Fort Awesome	2	26	United States	2011–12	Cartoon Network	Traditional
Shaktimaan: The Animated Series	2	26	India	2011	Nickelodeon Sonic	Flash
Sherlock Yack	1	52	France; Germany	2011–12	TF1; ZDF; KiKA	Flash
Silly Bitty Bunny	1	78	France; Canada; Singapore	2011	TiJi; Radio-Canada Télévision	Flash
Slash	1	26	Italy	2011	Rai 2	Traditional
Small Potatoes	1	27	United Kingdom United States	2011	CBeebies	Flash
Soul Quest Overdrive	1	6	United States	2011	Adult Swim	Flash
Space Dogs Family	2	104	Russia	2011–17	Russia-1	CGI
Special Agent Oso: Three Healthy Steps	1	15	United States	2011	Disney Junior	CGI; Live action
Superbook	5	68	United States; Japan	2011–21	CBN	CGI
Sweet Little Monsters	4	156	France	2011–22	Canal+ Family	Traditional (Seasons 1-2 and 4); Flash (Seasons 3-4)
T.R.EX.C.I	2	26	Brazil	2011–13	TV Rá-Tim-Bum	CGI
Thor & Loki: Blood Brothers	1	4	United States	2011		Motion comic
ThunderCats (2011)	1	26	United States; Japan	2011–12	Cartoon Network	Traditional
Toy Story Toons	1	3	United States	2011–12	Disney Channel	CGI
Traffic Safety with Poli	2	26	South Korea	2011–13	EBS1	CGI
Transformers: Rescue Bots	4	104	United States; Canada; Australia; Malaysia	2011–16	Hub Network (seasons 1–2); Discovery Family (seasons 3–4)	Traditional (season 1)/Flash (seasons 2–4)
Trunk Train	3	52	Brazil	2011–17	TV Brasil; TV Cultura; Cartoon Network	Flash
Uno, Dos, Tres... ¡A Jugar!	3	88	Chile	2011–12	UCTV	CGI
Vatalla	1	10	Indonesia	2011	Trans7	Traditional
Virus Attack	1	52	Italy	2011	Cartoon Network, Boing	Traditional
Voltron Force	1	26	Canada; United States	2011–12	Nicktoons	Traditional
Vulgarcito	2	16	Colombia	2011–18	MTV Latin America	Flash
Wild Kratts	7	174	United States; Canada	2011–present	TVOKids; Knowledge Kids; Télé-Québec; PBS Kids Go! (2011–13); PBS Kids (2013–present)	Flash/Live action
Yum Yum & You	1	78	Costa Rica	2011–12	Rocket Cartoons Jr, Kidstream	Flash
Zoobabu	1	104	Spain	2011	Canal Panda	CGI
Zootecnia, Descubriendo tu Lado Animal	1	26	Colombia	2011	Señal Colombia	Flash
Zooville	1	26	Canada	2011	TVOKids	Flash
Zumbastico Fantástico	1	20	Chile	2011–12	TVN; Cartoon Network	Flash

Anime television series first aired in 2011
Title	Episodes	Country	Year	Original channel	Technique
30-sai no Hoken Taiiku	12	Japan	2011		Traditional
A Channel	12	Japan	2011		Traditional
Anohana: The Flower We Saw That Day	11	Japan	2011		Traditional
Aria the Scarlet Ammo	12	Japan	2011		Traditional
Astarotte's Toy	12	Japan	2011		Traditional
B-Daman Crossfire	52	Japan	2011–12		Traditional
Baka and Test 2	13	Japan	2011		Traditional
Bakugan: Mechtanium Surge	46	Japan	2011–12	Teletoon	Traditional
Bakuman 2	25	Japan	2011–12		Traditional
Battle Girls: Time Paradox	13	Japan	2011		Traditional
Battle Spirits: Heroes	50	Japan	2011–12		Traditional
Beelzebub	60	Japan	2011–12		Traditional
Ben-To	12	Japan	2011		Traditional
Beyblade: Metal Fury	52	Japan	2011–12		Traditional
Blade	12	Japan	2011		Traditional
Blood-C	12	Japan	2011		Traditional
Blue Exorcist	25	Japan	2011		Traditional
Bunny Drop	11	Japan	2011		Traditional
C	11	Japan	2011		Traditional
C³	12	Japan	2011		Traditional
Cardfight!! Vanguard	65	Japan	2011–12		Traditional
Chibi Devi!	75	Japan	2011–14		Traditional
Chihayafuru	25	Japan	2011–12		Traditional
Croisée in a Foreign Labyrinth	12	Japan	2011		Traditional
A Dark Rabbit Has Seven Lives	12	Japan	2011		Traditional
DD Fist of the North Star	12	Japan	2011		Flash
Deadman Wonderland	12	Japan	2011		Traditional
Digimon Fusion: The Boy Hunters Who Leapt Through Time	25	Japan	2011–12	TV Asahi	Traditional
Digimon Fusion: The Evil Death Generals and the Seven Kingdoms	24	Japan	2011	TV Asahi	Traditional
Dog Days	13	Japan	2011		Traditional
Double-J	11	Japan	2011	NTV	Flash
Dragon Crisis!	12	Japan	2011		Traditional
Dream Eater Merry	13	Japan	2011		Traditional
Duel Masters Victory	52	Japan	2011–12		Traditional
The Everyday Tales of a Cat God	12	Japan	2011		Traditional
Fate/Zero	13	Japan	2011		Traditional
Fireball Charming	13	Japan	2011		CGI
Fractale	11	Japan	2011		Traditional
Freezing	12	Japan	2011		Traditional
Future Diary	26	Japan	2011–12		Traditional
Gdgd Fairies	12	Japan	2011	Tokyo MX	CGI
Ghastly Prince Enma Burning Up	12	Japan	2011		Traditional
Gintama'	51	Japan	2011–12		Traditional
Gosick	24	Japan	2011		Traditional
Ground Control to Psychoelectric Girl	12	Japan	2011		Traditional
Guilty Crown	22	Japan	2011–12		Traditional
Haganai	12	Japan	2011		Traditional
Hanasaku Iroha	26	Japan	2011		Traditional
Happy Kappy	25	Japan	2011		CGI
Heaven's Memo Pad	12	Japan	2011		Traditional
Hen Semi	13	Japan	2011		Traditional
Hidamari Sketch × SP	2	Japan	2011		Traditional
High Score	8	Japan	2011–12	Kids Station	
Horizon in the Middle of Nowhere	13	Japan	2011		Traditional
Hoshizora e Kakaru Hashi	12	Japan	2011		Traditional
Hunter × Hunter	148	Japan	2011–14		Traditional
Hyouge Mono	39	Japan	2011–12		Traditional
I Don't Like You at All, Big Brother!!	12	Japan	2011		Traditional
The Idolmaster	25	Japan	2011		Traditional
Inazuma Eleven GO	47	Japan	2011–12		Traditional
Infinite Stratos	12	Japan	2011		Traditional
Is This a Zombie?	12	Japan	2011		Traditional
Jewelpet Sunshine	52	Japan	2011–12		Traditional
Kaiji: Against All Rules	26	Japan	2011		Traditional
Kamisama Dolls	13	Japan	2011		Traditional
Kämpfer für die Liebe	2	Japan	2011		Traditional
Kimi ni Todoke 2	13	Japan	2011		Traditional
Kimi to Boku	13	Japan	2011		Traditional
Last Exile: Fam, the Silver Wing	21	Japan	2011–12		Traditional
Level E	13	Japan	2011		Traditional
Lilpri 2	51	Japan	2011–12		Traditional
Little Battlers eXperience	44	Japan	2011–12		Traditional
Majikoi: Oh! Samurai Girls	12	Japan	2011		Traditional
Maken-ki!	12	Japan	2011		Traditional
Manyū Hiken-chō	12	Japan	2011		Traditional
Maria Holic: Alive	12	Japan	2011		Traditional
Mashiroiro Symphony: The Color of Lovers	12	Japan	2011		Traditional
Mayo Chiki!	13	Japan	2011		Traditional
Mitsudomoe Zōryōchū!	8	Japan	2011		Traditional
Mobile Suit Gundam AGE	49	Japan	2011–12		Traditional
Morita-san wa Mukuchi	13	Japan	2011		Traditional
Morita-san wa Mukuchi 2	13	Japan	2011		Traditional
Moshidora	10	Japan	2011		Traditional
The Mystic Archives of Dantalian	12	Japan	2011		Traditional
Natsume's Book of Friends 3	13	Japan	2011	TV Tokyo	Traditional
Nichijou	26	Japan	2011		Traditional
No. 6	11	Japan	2011		Traditional
Nura: Rise of the Yokai Clan – Demon Capital	24	Japan	2011		Traditional
Nyanpire: The Animation	12	Japan	2011		
Ohayō Ninja-Tai Gatchaman	475	Japan	2011–13	NTV	Flash
Penguin no Mondai DX?	52	Japan	2011–12		
Penguindrum	24	Japan	2011		Traditional
Persona 4: The Animation	25	Japan	2011–12		Traditional
Phi Brain: Puzzle of God	25	Japan	2011–12		Traditional
Pretty Rhythm: Aurora Dream	51	Japan	2011–12		Traditional
Puella Magi Madoka Magica	12	Japan	2011		Traditional
The Qwaser of Stigmata II	12	Japan	2011		Traditional
R-15	12	Japan	2011		Traditional
Ring ni Kakero 1: Sekai Taikai-hen	6	Japan	2011		Traditional
Rio: Rainbow Gate!	13	Japan	2011		Traditional
Ro-Kyu-Bu!	12	Japan	2011		Traditional
Sacred Seven	12	Japan	2011		Traditional
Sekai Ichi Hatsukoi: The World's Greatest First Love	12	Japan	2011		Traditional
Sekai Ichi Hatsukoi: The World's Greatest First Love 2	12	Japan	2011		Traditional
Sengoku Paradise Kiwami	26	Japan	2011–12		
Shakugan no Shana Final	24	Japan	2011–12		Traditional
Shōwa Monogatari	13	Japan	2011		Traditional
Sket Dance	77	Japan	2011–12		Traditional
Softenni	12	Japan	2011		Traditional
Squid Girl 2	12	Japan	2011		Traditional
Steins;Gate	24	Japan	2011		Traditional
Suite PreCure	48	Japan	2011–12		Traditional
Tamayura: Hitotose	12	Japan	2011		Traditional
Tiger & Bunny	25	Japan	2011		Traditional
Tono to Issho: Gantai no Yabō	12	Japan	2011		Traditional
Toriko	147	Japan	2011–14	Fuji Television	Traditional
Tottoko Hamtarō Dechu	52	Japan	2011–12		Traditional
Twin Angel: Twinkle Paradise	12	Japan	2011		Traditional
Un-Go	11	Japan	2011		Traditional
Uta no Prince-sama: Maji Love 1000%	13	Japan	2011		Traditional
Wandering Son	11	Japan	2011		Traditional
We Without Wings	12	Japan	2011		Traditional
Wolverine	12	Japan	2011		Traditional
Working'!!	13	Japan	2011		Traditional
The World God Only Knows II	12	Japan	2011		Traditional
X-Men	12	Japan	2011		Traditional
You're Being Summoned, Azazel	13	Japan	2011		Traditional
Yu-Gi-Oh! Zexal	73	Japan	2011–12	TV Tokyo	Traditional
YuruYuri	12	Japan	2011		Traditional
Zoobles!	26	Japan, South Korea	2011	SBS	

== See also ==
- List of animated feature films of 2011
- List of Japanese animation television series of 2011
