= Köstebekgiller =

- Genre: Animated series Adventure; Comedy
- Written by: Arzu Yurtseven; Murat Ferhat
- Directed by: Birkan Uz
- Starring: İnci Türkay; Asena Keskinci; Yiğit Ege Yazar; Oğuz Oktay
- Country of origin: Turkey
- Original language: Turkish
- No. of seasons: 1
- No. of episodes: 13

Production
- Running time: 15 minutes

Original release
- Network: TRT Çocuk
- Release: May 8 – October 31, 2011

Köstebekgiller is a Turkish live-action/animated children's television series that airs on the TRT Çocuk broadcast channel.

== Premise ==
In the garden of a house in Istanbul lives a family of moles called the Köstelbeks. The family consisting of Dede the grandfather, Baba the father, Anne the mother, Boyo, Süslü and Bebi. One time, a human girl named Pelin first meets her neighbor Caner who is a naughty boy, he and Pelin don't get along from the first moment. Caner treats Pelin badly, so she wants to stay away from him.

== Cast ==
=== Real characters ===
- İnci Türkay
- Reyhan Asena Keskinci
- Yiğit Ege Yazar
- Oğuz Oktay
