= Anima TV =

- Genre: Animation
- Created by: Ministry of Culture (Brazil)
- Country of origin: Brazil
- Original language: Portuguese
- No. of seasons: 1
- No. of episodes: 17

Production
- Producer: TV Brasil

Original release
- Network: TV Brasil; YouTube
- Release: 2008 – 2010

Anima TV is a contest created by the Audiovisual Secretariat of the Ministry of Culture of the Brazilian government, in association with TV Cultura and TV Brasil, focusing on the production of Brazilian animated series. It began between 2008 and 2009, ending in 2010, when 17 short films were selected and broadcast simultaneously on TV Cultura and TV Brasil.

== History ==
As the first program to promote the production and broadcasting of Brazilian animated series, Anima TV received 257 pre-projects from 17 Brazilian states. Of these, 17 signed a co-production contract for the complete project and a pilot episode worth R$ 110,000. After the pilots aired on TV Cultura from January 25 to 30, 2010, two projects were selected to sign a new contract worth R$ 950,000, which provided for the production of 12 more episodes. The producers and authors also participated in workshops with consultants in the areas of Narrative, Art, Production, and Marketing.

== Winners ==
The two short films winners are Tromba Trem and Carrapatos e Catapultas, which were later produced as animated TV series, being broadcast by Cartoon Network and TV Brasil. However, other non-winning candidates also had their series produced after the contest ended, such as Historietas Assombradas (para Crianças Malcriadas), Zica e os Camaleões e Vivi Viravento.

Interestingly, the 17 short films are still being broadcast on the pay-TV channel TV Rá-Tim-Bum, alongside other animated series and original programs from the channel.

== Shorts ==
- A Princesa do Coração Gelado
- Abílio e sua traquitana
- Bolota e Chumbrega
- Carrapatos e Catapultas
- Hiperion
- Historietas Assombradas (para Crianças Malcriadas)
- Jajá, arara rara
- Miúda e Guarda-chuva
- Nave Sub D
- Piratas vs Ninjas vs Robôs vs Caubóis
- Platz na Cidade
- Scratch
- Tromba Trem
- Vai dar Samba
- Vivi Viravento
- Wilbor
- Zica e os Camaleões

== Producers ==
Anima TV had the following partnerships.

- Secretaria do Audiovisual (SAV) e Secretaria de Políticas Culturais (SPC) — both from Ministério da Cultura.
- Empresa Brasil de Comunicação — TV Brasil
- Fundação Padre Anchieta — TV Cultura
- Associação Brasileira das Emissoras Públicas Educativas e Culturais — ABEPEC
- Associação Brasileira de Cinema de Animação — ABCA
