= List of Hanasaku Iroha episodes =

The cover of the first DVD compilation for Hanasaku Iroha released by Pony Canyon on July 20, 2011

Hanasaku Iroha is a 2011 26-episode anime series produced by P.A. Works, which aired in Japan on Tokyo MX between April 3 and September 25, 2011, and was also simulcast on Crunchyroll. The story follows Ohana Matsumae who ends up moving away from the city to work at the Kissuiso hot spring inn in the country. The episodes were released on six DVD and Blu-ray volumes by Pony Canyon between July 20 and November 16, 2011.

For the first 13 episodes, the opening theme song is "Hana no Iro" (ハナノイロ; "The Color of a Flower") by Nano Ripe, and the main ending theme is "Hazy" by Sphere. For episodes 14 onwards, the opening theme is "Omokage Warp" (面影ワープ, Omokage Wāpu; "Trace Warp") by Nano Ripe, while the ending theme is "Hanasaku Iroha" (はなさくいろは; "Blooming Colors") by Clammbon. Nano Ripe provided several more ending theme songs: "Tsukikage to Buranko" (月影とブランコ; "Swing with the Moonlight") for episode 6, "Yumeji" for episodes 8 and 26, "Saibō Kioku" (細胞キオク; "Cellular Memories") for episode 11, and "High Leap" (ハイリープ, Hai Rīpu) for episode 22.

== Episode list ==
No.	Title	Original release date
1	"It's Spring, I'm 16, and I'm Still a Bud"; Transliteration: "Jū-Roku-sai, Haru, Mada Tsubomi" (Japanese: 十六歳、春、まだつぼみ)	April 3, 2011
Upon returning from school one day, Ohana Matsumae learns her mother is going on a moonlight flit with her boyfriend to escape from debt and they are sending her to live at her estranged grandmother's hot spring inn in the country. When her best friend, Kōichi Tanemura, hears of this, he confesses his love for Ohana before he ran off. As Ohana arrives at Kissuisō, she makes a bad first impression with one of the employees, Minko Tsurugi, before being informed by her grandmother, Sui Sujima, she is to work at the inn to earn her keep. She is shown around the inn by the head waitress, Tomoe Wajima, and another employee, Nako Oshimizu. When Ohana notices the hard work Minko has to do, she tries to do something nice for her by airing out her futon, but it ends up falling off a ledge and landing almost landing on some customers. After Minko is slapped by Sui for Ohana's mistake, Ohana demands she slapped even harder too, though Minko still tells her to 'die!'.
2	"Vengeance is a Staff Meal"; Transliteration: "Fukushū Suru wa, Makanai ni Ari" (Japanese: 復讐するは、まかないにあり)	April 10, 2011
Sui instructs Nako to train Ohana to become a housekeeper and server, though she is quite shy about it. When Nako has to attend to other duties, Ohana, having been taught to only rely on herself, cleans another room by herself, where the author Tarō Jirōmaru is staying. When the staff's breakfast is cancelled due to an error by Minko in the kitchen, Ohana makes breakfast for everyone, though this only serves to irritate Minko further. Afterwards, Tarō complains drafts for his story have gone missing from his room which Ohana had cleaned earlier, having not been informed by Nako beforehand. After Sui instructs the others to go to resume their duties rather than search for the draft, junior chef Tōru Miyagishi takes Ohana to pick up some luggage. As Tōru mocks Ohana's ability to take care of herself, Ohana inadvertently tells him to 'die' which nearly causes him to crash. Feeling guilty and taking a walk to reflect upon herself, Ohana decides to speak her mind against Minko and Nako, wanting to cook them their least favorite foods tomorrow as payback. The next day, Ohana finds Tarō's draft, which turn out to be erotic stories using her and the other employees as characters but is discovered by Tarō.
3	"Balut"; Transliteration: "Hobiron" (Japanese: ホビロン)	April 17, 2011
Minko and Nako discover Ohana has gone missing, as she has been confined, tied up and gagged by Tarō, who admits he was trying to come up with a sex novel to pay his hotel bill. When he is discovered by Nako and the others, he attempts to make a run for it by stealing one of the inn's vans, so all of the staff get in a car and give chase. They eventually find him at a seaside cliff where he jumps into the sea, but Nako dives in to save him from drowning. As Tarō laments his lack of talent, Ohana slaps him then tells him, even though his novel is perverted, they showed a side of Ohana she never knew about herself before. Afterwards, they arrange for Tarō to work at the inn to pay off his bill. Renji and Tōru cook up a meal with portable stoves from the back of the car. Their meal has plenty of spinach (Minko's least favorite food) and so Ohana takes the chance to serve Minko a bowl-full of it in place of the revenge meal Ohana had prepared for her earlier. Later at night, Ohana finds notes Minko wrote on devising an alternative insult to 'die', and also receives a text from Kōichi.
4	"Grey Heron Rhapsody"; Transliteration: "Aosagi Rapusodī" (Japanese: 蒼鷺ラプソディー)	April 24, 2011
The first day of the school trimester starts for Ohana, Minko and Nako, and Ohana soon finds herself popular with the other students in the class, including Yuina Wakura, who works at a rival hot springs inn, the Fukuya Inn. As Ohana tries to figure out how to respond to Kōichi's text, she and Nako go to the Fukuya Inn concerning the neighborhood watch where they encounter a grey heron, before visiting a temple, where Nako talks about how she wants to get rid of her timidness. Later, Ohana learns Minko actually has a crush on Tōru. As Ohana tries to apologies to Minko about it, they both witness Tōru picking up Yuina on his motorbike.
5	"A Tearful Chef Romance"; Transliteration: "Namida no Itamae Bojō" (Japanese: 涙の板前慕情)	May 1, 2011
As Minko continues to be downhearted from the other day, she overhears Ohana, Nako and Tomoe talking with Tarō, who claims Tōru had been scouted by Fukuya Inn. Tomoe reveals to Ohana it was Tōru who allowed Minko, who wanted to become a chef, to work at Kissuisō. After a failed attempt to get Minko to show her true feelings, Ohana goes by herself to the Fukuya Inn, where she learns from Yuina Tōru was simply filling in for an absent chef for the day, and she only wanted to have a ride on his motorbike. Afterward, Minko allows Ohana to call her by her nickname, while Ohana finally responds to her text from Kōichi.
6	"Nothing Venture Nothing Win"	May 8, 2011
Kissuisō is visited by a management consultant named Takako Kawajiri, wanting to revitalize the inn by having the waitresses wear new outfits. However, attempts to dress Ohana and Nako up in new outfits fares badly with the customers. After Takako takes her leave, Ohana's uncle, Enishi Shijima, feels depressed his efforts to help the inn are always rejected by Sui. As Ohana feels she should do something to help improve business, the janitor, Denroku Sukegawa, takes her to a secret room filled with old uniforms made by Sui over the years. Ohana and Nako decide to give these a try, which proves to be a hit with the customers.
7	"All Quiet on the Kissui Front"; Transliteration: "Kissui Sensen Ijō Nashi" (Japanese: 喜翆戦線異状なし)	May 15, 2011
Tomoe is pressured by her mother to attend a marriage interview in a week. Meanwhile, Kissuisō pays host to a group of rowdy 'survival gamers' who take their roleplay very seriously and cause various troubles for the employees. Planning to quit her job and return home, Tomoe decides to try to drive the gamers out and get fired. However, her attempts to irritate the gamers have the opposite effect, responding well to the gamers and making her appreciated by the other employees. As a result, Tomoe decides not to return home as she enjoys working at Kissuisō.
8	"Run"; Transliteration: "Hashiridasu" (Japanese: 走り出す)	May 22, 2011
Ohana learns from Yuina the Fukuya Inn is to be featured in a magazine, taking on a mystery guest. Meanwhile, Kissuisō gets a sudden surge of customers with Nako and Tōru on their day off, but as Sui prepares to put in her share of the work, she suddenly starts feeling pain and is taken into hospital. After Ohana is told to return to work, she gets a call from Kōichi, who tries to tell her he is on his way to visit her, but she is unable to hear it. Arriving back, the staff, along with Takako, suspect the inn may be hosting mystery guests from one of the magazines, suggesting they prioritize their service over the other customers. However, after finding Sui's accounting book, Ohana stands up against her, saying all customers need to be treated equally. Needing extra support to deal with the large number of customers, Ohana calls in Nako before going off to find Tōru, who is attending a wedding.
9	"The Longest Day at Kissuiso"; Transliteration: "Kissuisō no Ichiban Nagai Hi" (Japanese: 喜翆荘の一番長い日)	May 29, 2011
Ohana ends up finding Tōru with the encouragement from Kōichi. He tries to book a stay in order to see Ohana except the rooms were full and he went home. Tōru says if Ohana thinks he could solve the problem at Kissuisō, then he'll just have to fix it. While Tōru and Ohana travel back to Kissuisō, Kōichi passes by them in the train but does not realize it. During the journey back Ohana uses Tōru's helmet and wonders if all boys' hair smell like scent in the helmet. In the end, they pull through and tend to every customer. A woman and her mother were actually the people who were from the magazine and due to Ohana's motto every customer is equal, Kissuisō received a good rating. The Manager is discharged from the hospital and return to the inn. Ohana sends a text message to Kōichi, expressing her gratitude while Kōichi is working. After receiving it Kōichi gets called by one of the female workers to help look for something.
10	"Slight Fever"; Transliteration: "Binetsu" (Japanese: 微熱)	June 5, 2011
As a result of constantly getting up early to help clean, Ohana collapses with a fever and is told to rest for the day. Tōru makes her some rice porridge and becomes slightly enamored by her solemn appearance. Minko becomes jealous of the attention Tōru gives to Ohana. As various members visit Ohana and tell her to stay in bed, Ohana gets a strange dream where she is at the temple and Kōichi appears telling her to come bac since Kissuisō doesn't need her. There is a little girl and a young fox hiding while watching Ohana. This dream worries Ohana about whether the Kissuisō even needs her. However, just as she is writing out a text to Kōichi about possibly going home, Minko and Nako convince her she's still needed. She falls asleep and finds herself in the dream again where she tells Kōichi she wants to stay at Kissuisō. The little girl and the young fox can still be seen watching her during the dream.
11	"Bark at the Night"; Transliteration: "Yoru ni Hoeru" (Japanese: 夜に吼える)	June 12, 2011
After the Kissuisō gets a scathing review in a magazine, it becomes apparent all the hot spring inns in the area are receiving poor reviews whilst a newly constructed hotel is being praised. Wanting to get to the bottom of this, Ohana heads to Tokyo to find out who's responsible for the review, which turns out to be her mother, Satsuki. She reveals she wrote a poor reviews under orders from higher ups, which annoys Ohana, who had been bottling up her annoyances with her. When Satsuki refuses to go to Kissuisō to give her true opinion, Ohana decides to stage a protest. Whilst doing so, she decides to visit Kōichi, only to notice another girl seemingly attached to him. After hearing from Kōichi the girl, Igarashi, has an unrequited love for him, Ohana feels guilty and runs off into the rain in tears, but is found by Minko and Tōru.
12	"See ya." Transliteration: "Jaana." (Japanese: 『じゃあな。』)	June 19, 2011
After spending the night at a hotel with Minko and Tōru, Ohana suggests they kidnap Satsuki and force her to come to the Kissuisō, with Tōru only agreeing if they take Kōichi with them as well. Whilst Minko and Tōru visit Tokyo's various restaurants, Ohana runs into Igarashi, who tells her she needs to decide what her feelings for Kōichi are. After she gets a call back from Kōichi, who tells her about how he visited the Kissuisō whilst Ohana was searching for Tōru at the time, Ohana feels guilty and decides not to take Kōichi back to the Kissuisō with her. After joining up with Minko and Tōru, the group goes to see Satsuki, who decides by herself to go to the Kissuisō. When Tōru's asks Satsuki about why she changed her mind, she replies because Ohana reminded her of herself when she was younger.
13	"Shijima's Girl (Broken Heart MIX)"; Transliteration: "Shijima no Onna ~ Shōshin MIX ~" (Japanese: 四十万の女～傷心MIX～)	June 26, 2011
The staff members of Kissuisō wait and try to mentally prepare for Satsuki's arrival. Sui places Nako in charge of taking care of Satsuki, while the others speculate on whether or not that is a good idea. Arriving, Satsuki comments on how the inn hasn't changed at all from her years as a child, and criticizes constantly on how everything is done. However, Sui states in order to properly satisfy a customer one must observe the customer on their first stay to see what customer prefers. Adding even though it is Satsuki's first stay in the inn, it is not her first time being there. Sui and Ohana work together to make a list of what Satsuki likes. After a night of drinking, Satsuki, Ohana, and Sui all begin to understand each other a little better, and Satsuki leaves the next morning after writing a new, positive and praising review of Kissuisō. Ohana sorts out her feelings about Kōichi and, after a tearful realization, shouts her thanks to him for watching over her and says her farewells.
14	"This is My Way of Life"; Transliteration: "Kore ga Watashi no Ikiru Michi" (Japanese: これが私の生きる道)	July 3, 2011
Ohana's school goes on a field trip to another hot spring inn, managed by Yosuke Himawari, who is Yuina's distant relative and her alleged fiancé. They visit the beach, where a boy who was previously turned down by Minko before tries his luck again. Later at night, Ohana and Nako overhear Yosuke asking Yuina if she wanted to come work at his inn when she graduates. The next day, a group of part-timers working at the inn decide they want to quit. As Yosuke becomes irritated by this, Yuina tells him people will only do things they enjoy doing, declining Yosuke's offer of running his inn.
15	"Sunny With a Chance of Beans"; Transliteration: "Mame, Nochi, Hare" (Japanese: マメ、のち、晴れ)	July 10, 2011
The inn becomes troubled over becoming shorthanded but reject Ohana's offer to help out. However, she feels she needs to do something and, after the inn becomes unable to find replacement waitresses, they accept Ohana's help, with Minko and Nako deciding to help her out as well. However, the robotic system transporting dishes breaks down, Ohana suggests they send the customers to have a bath before dinner to give them extra time to set up the tables. As Ohana and the others work on the tables, getting help from the other students. Yuina visits Yosuke after hearing he might want to marry someone like Ohana, Yuina decides to break her habit of not working and help Yosuke clean the baths. After dinner, Yosuke allows the girls to use the hot springs. As the field trip comes to an end, Yosuke decides to rethink his training whilst Yuina decides to work harder herself.
16	"This Sky, That Sky"; Transliteration: "Ano Sora, Kono Sora" (Japanese: あの空、この空)	July 17, 2011
Enishi brings in Tetsuo Isami, a movie producer who wants to film in Yunosagi and use the Kissuiso as a locale for a movie, and to his surprise, Sui allows him to do as he pleases. The next day, the lead actresses are brought in, whilst camera tests are held and Ohana, Tomoe, and Nako are asked to clean a pool. As work progresses, Enishi laments how he always felt Satsuki was more suited to work at Kissuiso than he was.
17	"Pool on the Hill"; Transliteration: "Pūru on Za Hiru" (Japanese: プール・オン・ザ・ヒル)	July 24, 2011
Satsuki calls Sui, warning her there is something fishy about the film crew. The next day, they hear the project has been called off, putting Enishi in a tough spot as he had paid them a lot of money. Satsuki later calls him, telling him the producer was a scam artist trying to pay off his debts. As Enishi and Takako argue over the incident, they fall into the pool together and reconcile. After Sui explains her situation to the neighborhood association, she commends Enishi for his defense of Takako.
18	"A Mermaid Princess and a Shell Bra"; Transliteration: "Ningyo Hime to Kaigara Bura" (Japanese: 人魚姫と貝殻ブラ)	July 31, 2011
Nako has always been worried about her personality, which falters outside of her home. As Nako gets a larger bonus on payday, she becomes worried she needs to change in order to deserve the raise. Later in the day, she, Ohana, Minko and Yuina go shopping, where she ends up splashing out in the hopes of changing, though doesn't feel she has at the end of the day. The next day, Nako decides to go to work with the same attitude she has at home, but it ends up backfiring against her. When she asks Sui about why she got a big bonus, she explains it was as thanks from a customer who followed her advice, praising her for the personality she has at Kissuiso, which cheers Nako up.
19	"Sloppy Omelet Rice"; Transliteration: "Dorodoro Omuraisu" (Japanese: どろどろオムライス)	August 7, 2011
As a school festival approaches, Ohana's class decides to do a Princess Café, assigning Yuina and Minko as team leaders, whilst Nako's is put on the festival committee. Hearing Tōru is planning to visit, Minko decides to take her position in the cooking department seriously. However, Minko angers the other members of the food team when she rejects their request for omurice, so Minko decides to do everything herself.
20	"Love, Kōrin Festival"; Transliteration: "Ai Kōrinsai" (Japanese: 愛・香林祭)	August 14, 2011
It's the day before the school festival so Minko wakes up early to buy the ingredients, and to prep with the unwanted help of Ohana. When Nako asks to have omurice for lunch, Minko, unfazed, makes a perfect omurice dish. Adding Ohana's twist to the dish, they decide to also serve it on the menu of Class 2-A's princess cafe. Tōru arrives and Minko adds a big ketchup heart around his omurice. After they see from the class building the campfire was lit, Minko, Ohana, Yuina, Nako, and her classmate decide to go down and take a look.
21	"The Return of "Die""; Transliteration: "Yomigaeru Shine" (Japanese: 蘇る、死ね)	August 21, 2011
Enishi and Takako announce their engagement, with Sui insisting they hold a proper marriage ceremony. With high costs, Ohana suggests they hold the ceremony at the Kissuiso, with everyone else offering to pitch in. As Tōru takes Minko to the beach to calm her nerves, she becomes disheartened when he brings up Ohana out of the blue and starts lashing out again. With Takako concerned about the cost of the ring and willing to call off the wedding, Sui gives her old wedding ring, telling her about how she and her husband got married. She entrusts Enishi's happiness to Takako, but states she does not intend to pass down the inn to her.
22	"A Determined One-sided Crush"; Transliteration: "Ketsui no Kataomoi" (Japanese: 決意の片思い)	August 28, 2011
As ceremony preparation for Enishi and Takako continues, Ohana gets a call from Satsuki, who tells about the one-sided love she had for Ohana's late father, and decides to continue her own one-sided crush on Kōichi. Later, as Minko continues her antagonistic attitude towards Ohana, the two end up fighting, during which Tōru overhears about Minko's crush on him. He comforts her, admitting he has a liking for Ohana, but he still holds Minko's feelings in regard. Minko decides she won't give up on her crush on Tōru and makes up with Ohana, allowing Enishi and Takako's wedding to go smoothly. After the wedding, Sui announces Denroku is planning to retire from Kissuiso and his logs along with Kissuiso, will be sealed up.
23	"Compensation for a Dream"; Transliteration: "Yume no Otoshimae" (Japanese: 夢のおとしまえ)	September 4, 2011
As Ohana contemplates what she should do if the Kissuiso closes down, Sui asks her to go to Tokyo alongside Takako, who wants to try to reclaim the money Enishi lost. Meanwhile, Satsuki encounters Kōichi, who reveals he hasn't dumped Ohana and wants to know more about her. Satsuki takes him to her office where she shows him footage from the canceled film so he can see how she works at the Kissuiso. Upon arriving in Tokyo, Ohana and Takako manage to locate and apprehend Inashi. Afterwards, Ohana and Kōichi run into each other.
24	"Sui Shijima, The Last Boss"; Transliteration: "Rasu Bosu wa Shijima Sui" (Japanese: ラスボスは四十万スイ)	September 11, 2011
After spending some time with him, Ohana invites Kōichi to come to the Bonbori Festival before returning Tokyo. As Ohana returns to Kissuiso, they start getting a flood of reservations thanks to a positive review written by Satsuki. However, Sui insists she intends to close the Kissuiso down after the Bonbori Festival. The next day, Sui takes Ohana with her to visit her husband's grave, where Sui suddenly collapses. Sui explains she wanted to close Kissuiso down so the others could do whatever they want. Upon returning to the Kissuiso, the others are at odds with Sui, with only Ohana offering to help out with the Bonbori Festival preparations.
25	"My Beloved Kissuiso"; Transliteration: "Watashi no Suki na Kissuiso" (Japanese: 私の好きな喜翆荘)	September 18, 2011
With the increasing hotel reservations, Ohana grows concerned about the changes Kissuiso is making and the lack of sleep the employees are getting. She is finds herself at odds with some of the others for siding with Sui. Ohana tells Nako about what Sui told her, who tells her why her opinion differs. Things turn bad for the Kissuiso when Tomoe sprains her ankle on the day before the festival, but Sui and Satsuki arrive to fill in as waitresses and together they manage to make it through the day of the festival. Afterwards, everyone goes to the Bonbori festival.
26	"To Bloom One Day"; Transliteration: "Hanasaku Itsuka" (Japanese: 花咲くいつか)	September 25, 2011
As everyone explores the Bonbori festival, Ohana, who now dreams of being just like Sui goes to meet up with Kōichi, finally confessing her feelings for him. After the festival, a farewell party is held for Denroku, where Enishi announces he agrees to the Kissuiso being shut down until he feels he is talented enough to run it properly. As the Kissuiso closes down the next day and everyone parts ways, Sui sees off Ohana, who promises to return someday, giving her Denroku's log as a keepsake.
