= List of Kimi to Boku episodes =

This is a list of episodes of the anime series Kimi to Boku. The episodes in the anime are based from the manga series by Kiichi Hotta. An anime television adaption of Kimi to Boku was announced in the April 2011 issue of Monthly GFantasy. The series was produced by J.C. Staff under the direction of Mamoru Kanbe, with scripts supervised by Reiko Yoshida and music by Elements Garden; it began its broadcast run starting October 4, 2011. The series (also released in English under the title You and Me) was split into two 13-episode seasons.

For the first season, the opening theme "Bye Bye" (バイバイ) was performed by the Japanese rock band Seven Oops, while the ending "Nakimushi" (なきむし; lit. 'Crybaby') is by Miku Sawai.

A second season was announced on the main site and started airing on April 2, 2012. The opening song "Zutto" (ずっと) is performed by Tomohisa Sako.

== Episode list ==
=== Season 1 ===
No.	Title	Original airdate
1	"In Our 17th Spring"; Transliteration: "Bokura no 17-kai-me no Haru ni" (Japanese: ボクらの17回目の春に)	October 4, 2011
Shun is now a Second Year High School student, together with his childhood friends Yuuta, Yuuki and Kaname. During their break at the rooftop, Kaname and the rest agreed that Yuuki should join a club, but turns out to be a bit difficult for them to find him one.
2	"The Day the Tulips Bloomed"; Transliteration: "Chūrippu no Saita Hi" (Japanese: チューリップの咲いた日)	October 11, 2011
Shun, waiting for his friends to eat lunch together finds a girl with a scraped knee. He attempted to confront her, but she ran away. While the girl was stunned at the hallway, Shun succeeded in chasing her and gives her a bandage. The next day, Shun finds a letter that states that he will get cursed.
3	"The Boy With The Straw-Colored Hair"; Transliteration: "Mugiwarairo o Kabutta Shōnen" (Japanese: 麦藁色をかぶった少年)	October 18, 2011
A new student transferred to Yuuki and Kaname's class. His name is Chizuru Tachibana, a half-Japanese transfer student from Germany. He, seated next to Yuuki, stated that they played together when they were kids. However, Yuuki doesn't remember him at all.
4	"Noisy Medicine"	October 25, 2011
After an evening with his friends, Kaname catches a cold in which was not the worst of his troubles for today.
5	"Sometime During Summer"; Transliteration: "Itsuka no Natsu" (Japanese: いつかの夏)	November 1, 2011
It's the first day of summer. Chizuru decides to invite his friends to go out, but is rejected by all but Shun. Shun suggests inviting everyone, including Masaki, "Mary," to the summer festival.
6	"Glasses and Et Cetera"; Transliteration: "Megane to Etosetora" (Japanese: 眼鏡とエトセトラ)	November 8, 2011
At Kaname's house, the gang decided to cut Shun's hair short. While preparing to study for their exams, they talk about when Kaname started wearing glasses.
7	"Next to an Apple"; Transliteration: "Ringo no Tonari" (Japanese: りんごのとなり)	November 15, 2011
Chizuru, Kaname, Yuuki and Shun saw an unexpected confession of a quiet and shy girl to Yuuta. Even so, Yuuta does not tell any information regarding the incident to his friends. This results to the gang stalking Yuuta behind his back while he was on a supposed 'date' with her. In the end, it is revealed that Yuuta had known about the girl's situation all along; being bullied by her friends and wants to help her, even if it meant accepting her confession. The relationship between Yuuta and the girl, Takahashi-san is still unclear. However, at the end she and Yuuta broke up.
8	"Daily Wage Hero"; Transliteration: "Nikkyū Hīrō" (Japanese: 日給ヒーロー)	November 22, 2011
8	"Senpai and Me"; Transliteration: "Senpai to Boku" (Japanese: 先輩と僕。)	November 22, 2011
Yuuki has been asked by a first year student named Ryunosuke Matsushita, who is a member of the Manga Society of their school to draw a five-page manga for the club's anthology. After accepting this, Yuuki decides to divide his work with his friends namely: Yuuta working on the first page, Yuuki on second, Shun on third, Chizuru on fourth and Kaname on the last page. When they were all finished with their work, Chizuru asked Yuuki to make copies for everyone. Yuuki attempted to shred it to bits but was stopped by Chizuru and Kaname. On the side story of the episode, it reveals that Ryunosuke Matsushita admires Yuuki and thinks of him as his "hero".
9	"Naked King"	November 29, 2011
In a matter of days, the Homare High School Cultural Festival will start. Everyone is busy their preparations and also having fun in between. In this episode, we see how Kaname handles his day with his friends which frustrates him a lot and also his duties as a student council member.
10	"On your mark"	December 6, 2011
It's finally the day of the Cultural Festival and everyone prepares for their respective groups. Shun's class are doing a "cafe with a twist" and Kaname's class are doing a "stereotypical haunted house". In Masaki's class, they are going to play Cinderella on stage. Even if her role is a mouse, she is desperate to practice her dialogue. The gang watches her performance however, some of them are still wearing their costumes, which made Masaki to notice them easily, got nervous and accidentally mixed her lines up. Chizuru goes to comfort her after her performance.
11	"Crescent Moon Silhouette"; Transliteration: "Mikazuki Shiruetto" (Japanese: 三日月シルエット)	December 13, 2011
The gang decided to eat at the school cafeteria. It reveals that the cafeteria lady's daughter, Kayo is collecting stickers like Yuuki after he asked for the sticker she had on the plastic of her sandwich. The episode focuses on how the two collects 30 stickers in exchange for plates.
12	"Middle School Diary"; Transliteration: "Chūgakusei Nikki" (Japanese: 中学生日記)	December 20, 2011
After class, Shun gets an incoming call from his little brother, Fuyuki stating that they accidentally got their English notebooks mixed up and wants him to give it to him as soon as he can. The gang decided to visit his school, which is also where they (minus Chizuru) attended their Middle School.
13	"The Sunshine Song"; Transliteration: "Hidamari no Uta" (Japanese: 陽だまりの詩)	December 27, 2011
Shun proposes to the rest of the gang to conduct a work experience at their old school, Hidamari Kindergarten. Almost everyone were excited except for a pouting Chizuru who attended a different kindergarten. Shun cheers the gloomy Chizuru up and they went on to their plan. Once they arrived, they end to up see some quirky pupils around and a certain pupil who is a bit troublesome especially for Kaname. The episode ends with Shun exposing Kaname's feelings for his past teacher, Kaori-sensei, thus making Chizuru laugh and embarrassing Kaname.

=== Season 2 ===
No.	Title	Original airdate
1	"The Rabbit in the Moon Hops All Night Long"; Transliteration: "Tsuki no Usagi wa Yoru o Haneru" (Japanese: 月のうさぎは夜を跳ねる)	April 3, 2012
The gang goes over to Kaname's house to deliver tangerines and much to Kaname's chagrin they stay for dinner and invite themselves to sleepover. Hijinks ensue as they reminisce about the past and joke about each other's idiosyncrasies.
2	"Mary's Christmas"	April 10, 2012
Chizuru begins to openly show his feelings for Masaki and decides to prepare a Christmas gift for her despite knowing her feelings.
3	"Very Christmas"	April 17, 2012
On Christmas Eve the gang runs into Azuma-sensei and his childhood friend, Akira. While trying to help a little girl Chizuru accidentally knocks over a Christmas tree forcing all of them to dress up and work with Akira as Santa Claus.
4	"In the Steam"; Transliteration: "Yuge no naka ni" (Japanese: ゆげのなかに)	April 24, 2012
On New Year's Eve, the Asaba twins have a fight.
5	"The Hem of the Sky"; Transliteration: "Ano sora no suso" (Japanese: あの空の裾)	May 1, 2012
On New Year's Day, the gang visits a shrine to pray for good luck, but things happen to derail their plan.
6	"Colorless Blue"	May 8, 2012
Kayo is quitting her job in the cafeteria to pursue a career in a salon, and Yuuki is unsure of how to think of it.
7	"Sweet, Sweet, Bitter"	May 15, 2012
For Valentine's day Masaki spies a girl from another school confessing to Shun, leading to a realization of Masaki's feelings of hopelessness and Chizuru's own feelings.
8	"Us Boys"; Transliteration: "Bokutachi Otoko no Ko" (Japanese: ぼくたち男の子)	May 22, 2012
Shun worries about how fast his little brother's relationship is progressing - he thinks kissing is too early for middle schoolers. He calls over the gang to discuss the "emergency" which only worsens his anxieties. As a result the gang spies on his hormonal brother's date.
9	"Mix Juice"	May 29, 2012
Reminiscent of the first episode of the first season, the boys complain about how Kaname wastes money on buying tea, which leads to the gang persuading Yuuki to get a part-time job. Lazy Yuuki eventually folds for the sake of buying a new video game and lands a job as a waiter. The gang visits him on the first day of work leading to a messy situation and Yuuki losing his first kiss.
10	"Cherry"	June 5, 2012
Masaki and Chizuru have been avoiding each other since Chizuru's confession that he likes her.
11	"Sugar Baby, Fly Baby"	June 12, 2012
As the gang's third year begins, the sports festival is on the way.
12	"Stripped Bare"; Transliteration: "Seki Rara" (Japanese: 赤裸々)	June 19, 2012
Kaname spends dinner with his neighbor who he likes, only to find out she is getting married.
13	"Navel and Dignity"	June 26, 2012
Shun is troubled about his future as everyone else seems to be more prepared than him. Also, Chizuru, Yukki, and Kaname visit the Tea club with Shun and Yuta.
