= List of Gosick episodes =

Gosick
- The cover of the first Blu-ray volume.
- No. of episodes: 24

Release
- Original network: TV Tokyo
- Original release: January 8 – July 2, 2011

Gosick is a Japanese anime television series based on the light novel series of the same name written by Kazuki Sakuraba, with illustrations by Hinata Takeda. The anime was produced by Bones under the direction of Hitoshi Nanba and script supervision by Mari Okada. The series aired on TV Tokyo between January 8 and July 2, 2011. However, the broadcast of episode 11 and afterward was affected by the 2011 Tōhoku earthquake and tsunami. The series was simulcast by Crunchyroll with English subtitles. The opening theme is "Destin Histoire" by Risa Yoshiki and was released on March 2, 2011. For the first 12 episodes, the ending theme is "Resuscitated Hope" by Lisa Komine and was released on April 27, 2011. From episodes 13–24, the ending theme is "Unity", also by Lisa Komine. Bandai Entertainment had licensed the anime, but later cancelled the release of Gosick. Madman Entertainment have licensed the series in Australia and New Zealand and are releasing subtitled-only DVDs until a dubbed version becomes available. Funimation has licensed the series in North America and released the first half of the series on a Blu-ray and DVD combo pack on May 30, 2017, with an English dub. Following Sony's acquisition of Crunchyroll, the series was moved to Crunchyroll.

== Episode list ==
| No. | Title | Original release date |
|---|---|---|
| 1 | "The Dark Reaper Finds the Golden Fairy"; Transliteration: "Kuroi Shinigami wa Kin'iro no Yōsei wo Mitsukeru" (Japanese: 黒い死神は金色の妖精を見つける) | January 8, 2011 |
In the fictional European country of Sauville, Japanese exchange-student Kazuya Kujo has a fateful encounter with Victorique de Blois, a mysterious and intelligent girl that could easily solve a case of murder when fed by the police on the details of the crime. Kujo is overcome by Victorique's doll-like appearance and surprising wit. He is amazed to learn of her deductive powers when they are caught up in a murder investigation.
| 2 | "The Souls of the Dead Raise a Shipwreck"; Transliteration: "Shisha no Tamashii ga Nampasen wo Oshiageru" (Japanese: 死者の魂が難破船をおしあげる) | January 15, 2011 |
Figuring about a greater scheme behind a murder, Victorique and Kujo end up infiltrating an exclusive party at a huge luxury ship and get themselves trapped into a mortal game. One by one all the passengers on the ship begin to die, leaving only a few survivors. It is up to the duo to solve the mystery and leave the ship alive.
| 3 | "The Hares Break a Promise Under the Morning Sun"; Transliteration: "Nousagi-tachi wa Asahi no Shita de Yakusoku wo Kawasu" (Japanese: 野兎達は朝陽の下で約束をかわす) | January 22, 2011 |
After surviving the events at the ship along with Kujo, Victorique uncovers the truth behind what happened there, and about a similar incident that occurred ten years before. Her deductive reasoning astonishes her audience as she reveals the reasons behind both incidents.
| 4 | "The Golden Thread Cuts Through a Passing Moment"; Transliteration: "Konjiki no Ito wa Tsuka no Ma wo Kirisaku" (Japanese: 金色の糸はつかのまを切り裂く) | January 29, 2011 |
Kujo becomes the suspect of a bizarre murder in which he witnesses a biker's head flying off. Victorique manages to quickly clear his name and guide Grevil to the real culprit. Later at the school, Kujo is introduced to Avril Bradley, a beautiful student from England who soon becomes his friend in spite of the school rumors about him being a 'reaper', but it does not take long for him to figure out that there is something wrong with her.
| 5 | "There's a Mysterious Ghost in the Abandoned Storehouse"; Transliteration: "Haisōko ni wa Nazo no Yūrei ga Iru" (Japanese: 廃倉庫には謎の幽霊がいる) | February 5, 2011 |
Kujo is still puzzling over Avril and cannot understand what is bothering him about her character. He begs Victorique to find him a book in hope that it would give him a clue to Avril's mystery. Instead, Kujo is knocked unconscious and the book disappears. Victorique reveals to Kujo that the Avril Bradley he knows is actually an impostor and the successor of the legendary thief, Kuiaran. After Kujo rescues the real Avril Bradley, the duo confronts Kuiaran the Second on top of the library tower who came looking for the book.
| 6 | "The Gray Wolves Summon Their Brethren"; Transliteration: "Haiiro no Ōkami wa Dōhō wo Yobi Yoseru" (Japanese: 灰色の狼は同胞を呼びよせる) | February 12, 2011 |
Just after reading an article on a newspaper brought by Kujo, Victorique flees from the academy and sets with him for the small town of Horovitz. After arriving there, she explains to him that her mother, Cordelia Gallo, was falsely accused of murder, and she refuses to return home before proving her innocence.
| 7 | "A Divine Revelation is Given at the Summer Solstice Festival"; Transliteration: "Geshi-sai ni Shintaku wa Kudasareru" (Japanese: 夏至祭に神託はくだされる) | February 19, 2011 |
Victorique and Kujo explore the "Village of the Gray Wolves" where her mother lived in search for clues to prove her innocence, but Victorique gets disappointed when she uncovers the truth and figures that she lacks the means to clear her name. To complicate matters, two of the tourists who were visiting the village with them are killed among strange circumstances.
| 8 | "Howling Echoes from the Kingdom of the Past"; Transliteration: "Kako no Ōkoku ni Tōboe ga Kodama Suru" (Japanese: 過去の王国に遠吠えがこだまする) | February 26, 2011 |
Victorique manages to find the culprit behind the recent deaths at the village and to clear her mother's name by exposing the woman who framed her. However, when the woman attempts to escape, she starts torching the entire village, and Kujo must confront her while protecting Victorique with his life.
| 9 | "Blue Roses Bloom in the Cannibal Department Store"; Transliteration: "Hito-kui Depāto ni Aobara wa Saku" (Japanese: 人食いデパートに青薔薇は咲く) | March 5, 2011 |
Victorique gets a fever as Kujo sets out alone for some errands in Saubreme. While searching for a souvenir for his sister, he meets a girl among a pile of mannequins. The girl asks for help, but when he gets back to the department store with the Inspector, she is nowhere to be found. Kujo calls Victorique by phone to ask her help, but the call is cut short as he is taken away.
| 10 | "Girl with a Cold Dreams of Her Stubborn Friend"; Transliteration: "Kazehiki wa Ganko na Yūjin no Yume wo Miru" (Japanese: 風邪ひきは頑固な友人の夢をみる) | March 12, 2011 |
Kujo encounters the same girl he met at the department store, and with the help of hers and a bright homeless boy, he manages to put the police back on the case. Kujo and Grevil then ask Victorique's opinion about the store, just to find that she already had made some research about it, and she comes with a plan to expose the culprits.
| Special | Transliteration: "Haru kitaru GOSICK Supesharu – Utsukushiki Kaibutsu wa Konton no Saki wo Miru -" (Japanese: 春来たるGOSICKスペシャル-美しき怪物は混沌の先を視る-) | March 26, 2011 |
A recap episode with interviews with the cast.
| 11 | "That Drill Eloquently Speaks of Love"; Transliteration: "Sono Doriru wa Yūben ni ai wo Kataru" (Japanese: そのドリルは雄弁に愛を語る) | April 2, 2011 |
Jaqueline, an old friend of Grevil's, pays a visit to the Academy to make a donation and has a sudden encounter with Victorique at the Library Tower. There, she tells the story of a mysterious incident from the past where she was falsely accused of murder, unaware about its connection with both Victorique and the reason why Grevil has started bearing his unusual hairstyle.
| 12 | "The Cicadas are Heard on Summer Afternoons"; Transliteration: "Natsu no Gogo ni Semi no Koe wo Kiku" (Japanese: 夏の午後に蝉の声を聞く) | April 9, 2011 |
Everybody in school is preparing for their summer vacation. Kujo has turned down his vacation trip with Avril to stay with Victorique. During his quiet days with her, Kujo has a flash back of his childhood and his reasons to leave Japan to study abroad.
| 13 | "A Fool Designates His Own Mouthpiece"; Transliteration: "Gusha wa Onore no Daiben-sha wo Shimei Suru" (Japanese: 愚者は己の代弁者を指名する) | April 16, 2011 |
Kujo and Avril explore one of the school's towers and Avril figures that it is related to the legend of Leviathan, an alchemist who lived there decades before. Victorique stumbles on a pop-up book containing a cryptic message allegedly from Leviathan himself and when a death occurs at the top of the tower, she decides to investigate by herself.
| 14 | "A Malicious Frill Denounces a Farting Newt"; Transliteration: "Ijiwaru Furiru wa Hekokiimori wo Kyūdan Suru" (Japanese: 意地悪フリルは屁こきいもりを糾弾する) | April 23, 2011 |
Victorique is dragged by her teacher to her classroom and is introduced to the rest of her classmates. Avril tries to bring her attention but she gets angry on her instead. Kujo demands Victorique to apologize to her, and when she refuses, he sets with Avril to keep investigating the Leviathan case without her help. Meanwhile Victorique has an encounter with Brian Roscoe, a friend of the victim's, on the top of the clock tower.
| 15 | "Two Monsters See Eye to Eye"; Transliteration: "Nihiki no Kaibutsu wa Kokoro wo Kayowaseru" (Japanese: 二匹の怪物は心をかよわせる) | April 30, 2011 |
Kujo inquires Brian Roscoe regarding his connection to Victorique and her mother, but he only warns him to beware of her father instead. Meanwhile, Victorique succeeds to unlock the secrets behind Leviathan, the clock tower and the truth about her own origin.
| 16 | "The Felling Maria has a Fly's Head"; Transliteration: "Rakka Saseru Maria wa Hae no Atama wo Motsu" (Japanese: 落下させるマリアは蠅の頭をもつ) | May 7, 2011 |
Victorique's father has her taken from the academy to a convent known as "Beelzebub's Skull" in Lithuania. Kujo learns about her whereabouts from Grevil and takes a train going there to look for her. Guided by a woman who resembles a lot like her, Kujo manages to find where Victorique is held and learns from her that the woman is most likely her mother, Cordelia.
| 17 | "The Box Lies in the Spiral Labyrinth"; Transliteration: "Rasen no Meikyū ni Sono Hako wa Nemuru" (Japanese: 螺旋の迷宮にその箱はねむる) | May 14, 2011 |
Victorique reveals to Kujo that her father brought her to the convent in order to bait out Cordelia and Brian. As the two escape, they become separated by an illusion. Victorique encounters Brian, who reveals that he is planning to stop her father and the Academy. Meanwhile, Kujo runs into Cordelia, who entrusts him with a ring and some words of encouragement for her daughter, then Marquis Albert de Blois himself. Albert attempts to force Kujo to surrender Victorique to him, but Kujo refuses and leaves. The floodgates shielding the convent are opened by a time-release trap set by Albert, flooding the entire area, and Kujo barely escapes with Victorique.
| 18 | "The Jet-Black Train Carries Several Lies"; Transliteration: "Shikkoku no Ressha wa Ikutsu ka no Uso wo Hakobu" (Japanese: 漆黒の列車はいくつかの嘘を運ぶ) | May 21, 2011 |
Having escaped from the flood, Victorique, Kujo and the rest of the passengers of the Masquerade Express find themselves involved into a bloody contest for an elusive item that can shake the balance of power between the Science Academy and the Ministry of Occult.
| 19 | "The Rose Colored Life is Buried Under Fresh Snow"; Transliteration: "Barairo no Jinsei wa Shinsetsu ni Uzumoreru" (Japanese: 薔薇色の人生は新雪に埋もれる) | May 28, 2011 |
Kujo leaves to the capital to find a present to Victorique's birthday which coincidentally is on Christmas day. Meanwhile, Victorique receives a message from her mother and starts looking for Kujo without success until she is summoned by her father and taken by Grevil to the capital to solve the greatest mystery of the country, which involves its previous queen, Coco Rose, whose life is being reenacted in a play at the Phantom Theater.
| 20 | "Guided by the Phantom's Ghost"; Transliteration: "Fantomu no Yūrei ni Michibika Reru" (Japanese: ファントムの幽霊に導かれる) | June 4, 2011 |
Finding out that Victorique has been summoned yet again by her father, Kujo races to catch up with her, only for her to disappear again. The Inspector reveals to Kujo that Victorique might not be able to leave, unless she figures the real truth about Coco Rose's death, and thus he starts searching the city for more clues regarding the case.
| 21 | "The Bells of Christmas Eve Toll at the Heels of Time"; Transliteration: "Sēya no Kane wa Toki wo Oitateru" (Japanese: 聖夜の鐘は刻を追いたてる) | June 11, 2011 |
Upon investigating the grave of a woman, Nicole Lulu, with a striking resemblance to Queen Coco Rose, Victorique manages to put together the truth behind the woman's mysterious demise. The truth behind the Coco Rose case and the disappearance of Nicole Lulu is made clear, and Albert frees Victorique when she is unable to conclusively identify the murderer. On the way home to the Academy, Victorique and Kujo encounter a seemingly ordinary couple who are actually the still-living Coco Rose and her son fathered by Leviathan. Cordelia watches over them as they arrive home, and is soon joined by Brian who is revealed not to be one single person, but a pair of identical twins.
| 22 | "A Christmas Carol Decorates the Windowsill's Happiness"; Transliteration: "Kurisumasu Kyaroru wa Madobe no Saiwai wo Kazaru" (Japanese: クリスマス・キャロルは窓辺の幸いを飾る) | June 18, 2011 |
Kujo is enjoying Christmas together with Victorique when he is suddenly taken by force from the Academy since King Rupert declared that all foreign citizens should be sent back to their home countries because of imminent conflict in Sauville. However, Kujo manages to escape and returns to the Academy eager to meet Victorique again, unaware that he became a hostage in Albert's hands as a means to ensure her cooperation with his plan.
| 23 | "Call Checkmate on an Ash-Colored Chessboard"; Transliteration: "Haizome no Chesu ni Chekkumeito wo Tsugeru" (Japanese: 灰染めのチェスにチェックメイトを告げる) | June 25, 2011 |
All the pieces of Albert's plan have fallen into place. Kujo has been deported and Victorique has been imprisoned in the Sauville royal palace. Using her wisdom, Albert exposes Jupiter Roget's identity as a Gray Wolf to the other nobility and runs him out, then persuades King Rupert to make an alliance with the rising power of Germany. Kujo has been enlisted into the Japanese military, Albert is soon to be named the new Prime Minister of Sauville and has Grevil bring Victorique out during the ceremony to show off his power. However, sometime before the ceremony Cordelia switched places with Victorique, and confronts Albert, revealing his crimes to the entire country. When one of the Brian Roscoe twins stages a terrorist attack on the ceremony, Cordelia engages Albert in a sword fight using a pair of short swords as weapons and successfully kills him, but is slain herself by one of Albert's minions. Meanwhile, the other Brian, who has taken Victorique away in a stagecoach, attempts to kill her to erase Cordelia's "pain" as he sees it.
| 24 | "Looking at Infinity over the Grim Reaper's Shoulder"; Transliteration: "Shinigami no Katagoshi ni Eien wo Miru" (Japanese: 死神の肩越しに永遠をみる) | July 2, 2011 |
After trying to kill Victorique, the Brian Roscoe who was with her fell from a cliff and was seriously injured, while his brother died with Cordelia in Sauville. Victorique saved him and took him to the port where they were found by Grevil who had orders to capture them, but lets them escape instead. In a boat leaving the country, Brian states to Victorique that Cordelia was the kind of mother he and his brother always wanted, and was envious of Cordelia's love for her. Begging her to keep living for her mother's sake, he passes on. She is then approached by Jupiter Roget, who was bringing with him Kujo's letters to her. After the war ends, the academy is reopened, Grevil, who had now paid his debt to Victorique, sports his old hairstyle again, and Kujo returns safely to a war-torn Japan to meet with his family where Victorique, who made use of the letters to find her way to his home and lived there since then was also waiting for him. Once again reunited, Kujo and Victorique state that no matter how the world changes, they will always be together. The story ends with Victorique, wearing a wedding gown, walking hand in hand with Kujo.
