= List of Tamayura episodes =

Tamayura is a Japanese anime series directed by Junichi Sato. The series revolves around Fū "Potte" Sawatari, a photography-loving girl who moves to the town where she grew up with her late father and spends time hanging with her friends. Hal Film Maker produced four original video animation (OVA) episodes which aired on AT-X between September 6 and December 6, 2010, before receiving release on DVD and Blu-ray Disc (BD) in two volumes released on November 26 and December 23, 2010, respectively. This was followed by a twelve-episode anime television series titled Tamayura: Hitotose and produced by TYO Animations, which aired in Japan between October 3 and December 19, 2011. The series was released on DVD and Blu-ray Disc between December 21, 2011, and June 27, 2012, the last volume of which included a bonus OVA episode. A second television season, Tamayura: More Aggressive, aired in Japan between July 3, 2013, and September 18, 2013, with an OVA episode released on June 14, 2014. A four-part film series, Tamayura: Sotsugyō Shashin, was released between April 4, 2015, and April 2, 2016.

The OVAs have four pieces of theme music: one opening theme, two ending themes, and one insert song. The opening theme is "Yasashisa ni Tsutsumareta nara" (やさしさに包まれたなら) by Maaya Sakamoto. The first ending theme is "Melody" (メロディ), and the second ending theme is "Natsudori" (夏鳥); both songs are sung by Megumi Nakajima. "Melody" was used for episode two in the BD/DVD version, and for episodes one through three for the TV broadcast. "Natsudori" was used for episode four for both the BD/DVD version and TV broadcast version. The insert song "Naisho no Hanashi" (ナイショのはなし), also by Nakajima, was featured in episode three. The opening theme single was released on October 20, 2010. The single containing the ending themes and insert song was released on November 24, 2010. The OVA's original soundtrack was released on December 22, 2010. For Hitotose, the opening theme is "Okaerinasai" (おかえりなさい, Welcome Home) by Toshiyuki Mori, whilst the main ending theme is "Kamisama no Itazura" (神様のいたずら, God's Mischief) by Nakajima. For More Aggressive, the opening theme is "Hajimari no Umi" (はじまりの海, The Sea of Beginnings) by Sakamoto whilst the ending theme is "Arigatō" (ありがとう, Thank You) by Nakajima. For the movie, Sotsugyō Shashin, the theme song is Kore Kara (これから, From Here On Out) by Sakamoto.

== Episode list ==
=== Tamayura (2010 OVA series) ===
No.	Title	Original release date
1	"The Town Full of Things I Love"; Transliteration: "Daisuki ga Ippai no Machi, na no de" (Japanese: 大好きがいっぱいの町、なので)	September 6, 2010 (AT-X); November 26, 2010 (BD/DVD)
As Fū Sawatari and her friend Kaoru Hanawa go to a camera shop to retrieve her late father's camera which needed to be fixed, they spot a pair of girls, Maon Sakurada and Norie Okazaki, taking an interest of a photo Fū once took of her father. They decide to hang out together and become friends.
2	"The Small, Light Blue Ticket"; Transliteration: "Mizuiro no Chissana Kippu, na no de" (Japanese: 水色のちっさな切符、なので)	October 4, 2010 (AT-X); November 26, 2010 (BD/DVD)
Fū and her friends visit her mother and grandmother's cafe, where she receives a letter from her photographer idol, Riho Shihomi, containing a ticket to a photo exhibit. At the exhibit, Fū finally gets to meet Riho, who explains the meaning of the destination-less ticket she had previously given her.
3	"I'm Happy When We All Walk Together"; Transliteration: "Minna de Arukeba Happī, na no de" (Japanese: みんなで歩けばハッピー、なので)	November 8, 2010 (AT-X); December 23, 2010 (BD/DVD)
As Fū becomes curious about where one of her old photos were taken, Kaoru's sister, Sayomi, decides to take her and her friends on a hiking trip to that location, though the journey turns out longer than expected. Though they don't find the place where the photo was taken, they enjoy the place they arrive at.
4	"About That Day"; Transliteration: "Sore wa Ano Hi no Koto, na no de" (Japanese: それはあの日のこと、なので)	December 6, 2010 (AT-X); December 23, 2010 (BD/DVD)
Riho decides to visit Fū's home to look at the photos. Later, Sayomi takes everyone on another trip to another potential candidate for the place where Fū took her photo. Fū ends up spraining her ankle, but gets help from the camera shop owner, who helps her realize that this was the place she took the photo.

=== Tamayura: Hitotose (2011 TV series) ===
No.	Title	Original air date
1	"It's The Town Where I Grew Up"; Transliteration: "Watashi no Hajimari no Machi, na no de" (Japanese: わたしのはじまりの町、なので)	October 3, 2011
In her final year of middle school, Fū is a middle school student who had previously locked away her feelings following the death of her father. She returns home one day to find her brother, Kou, had taken out all the old photos their father had taken. Fū comes to understand the warmth of these photos and takes an interest in photography, asking to use her father's old camera. After taking a few photos, mainly with her friend Chihiro Miyoshi, she sends some to Riho who responds with positive feedback and a train ticket with no destination. After deciding that she'd like to go to high school in Takehara, where her father was brought up, the whole family decides to move there. After saying her goodbyes to Chihiro, Fū travels to Takehara where she meets with Kaoru.
2	"A Day Wrapped in Scents"; Transliteration: "Yasashii Kaori ni Tsutsumareta Nichi, na no de" (Japanese: やさしい香りに包まれた日、なので)	October 10, 2011
It's been a month since Fū moved to Takehara, and she and her friends feel a bit bemused by the antics of her homeroom teacher, Mr. Dougou. After hearing Sayomi is going to be out of the house, Fū suggests a sleepover at her place. However, on the day of the sleepover, Dougou asks Kaoru to help out with making bamboo figures to impresse the Hoboro okonomiyaki shop manager, so Fū and the others decide to help. As the girls finally resume their sleepover, Sayomi appears, telling him that Dougou had Kaoru's loneliness in mind when he asked her for help. As everyone else sleeps, Sayomi gives Fū her thanks for returning to this town.
3	"Arrival! Battling Girls"; Transliteration: "Hitsugen! Tatakau Onna no ko, na no de" (Japanese: 出現！たたかう女の子、なので)	October 17, 2011
As Norie decides to try to learn to make sweets from Fū's grandmother, she is pestered by Kou's classmate, Komachi, who challenges her to see who can make the tastiest dessert with Kou acting as judge. Though Komachi struggles at first, Fū's grandmother helps her realise the most important thing about cooking; thinking about making the person who will eat it smile. After Kou tries both Norie and Komachi's dishes, the contest is declared a tie. Afterwards, Norie reveals it was her older brother who inspired her to aim to become a patissiere.
4	"The Sounds of Shiomachi Island"; Transliteration: "Shiomachi shima ni Kikoeru oto, na no de" (Japanese: 潮待ち島に聞こえる音、なので)	October 24, 2011
Fū and her friends decide to have their summer vacation in Mitarai, where Maon's family runs an inn. While exploring the town, they visit a theatre which seems to hold some symbolism for Maon. After the gang visits Fū's grandfather, Maon explains that a guitar concert she once saw at that theatre inspired her to aim to try and perform on that stage at some point.
5	"Chihiro-chan Comes to Visit"; Transliteration: "Chihiro-chan ga Kitekuruta yo! Na no de" (Japanese: ちひろちゃんがきてくれたよ! なので)	October 31, 2011
Chihiro comes to Takehara to visit Fū, though ends up getting off a station too early. As Fū's mother goes to pick her up, Fū hears from her biker friends about how she once was a motorcyclist. The next day, Fū takes Chihiro to meet the others, visiting various place to get along. Later, Sayomi takes everyone on a lengthy expedition to Kurotaki Hill, where everyone becomes friends with Chihiro and exchanges e-mail addresses.
6	"That's Something That'll Happen One Day"; Transliteration: "Sore wa Itsuka no Hi no koto, na no de" (Japanese: それはいつかの日のこと、なので)	November 7, 2011
6	"Something That Happened One Day"; Transliteration: "Soshite Aru Hi no koto, na no de" (Japanese: そしてある日のこと、なので)	November 7, 2011
Back in Autumn 1999, Fū meets Maon at the top of a hill after hearing her read out a story she is writing. When an incident between Kaoru and Norie, who also arrive at the top of the hill, causes everyone to start crying, Maon manages to calm everyone down with her whistling. After Fū returns to her father, Maon is able to come up with an ending to her story. Ten years later, Maon, who is now in middle school but is having trouble making friends, encounters Norie, who became depressed after a boy rejected her offer of sweets. As the two discuss their ambitions, they find something nostalgic about Maon's whistling and they become friends.
7	"Promise of the Bamboo Lights"; Transliteration: "Takeakari no Yakusoku, na no de" (Japanese: 竹灯りの約束、なので)	November 14, 2011
As the town makes preparations for a bamboo light festival, Riho comes around to visit Fū. As they visit Hoboro, Dougo asks for the girls' help so he can confess to the owner. As rain starts to fall, Fū and Kaoru become worried that the Road of Aspiration they were looking forward to might be cancelled. While writing wishes, they meet Shouko Hirono, who played with Kaoru and Fū once during their childhood. Luckily, the rain stops in time and Fū and Kaoru are able to enjoy the festival for the first time since Fū moved.
8	"Unchanging People in Changing Times"; Transliteration: "Kawaranai Nin Kawariyuku Toki, na no de" (Japanese: かわらない人かわりゆく時、なので)	November 21, 2011
After Fū learns Riho is staying with Hoboro's owner and becomes curious about the relationship between the two. Meanwhile, Komachi also takes up traditional photography. As Fū and the others learn the owner's real name, Chimo Yakusa, she becomes concerned after hearing Riho had stopped taking pictures of the sky. Later, Fū accompanies Riho and Chimo to a restaurant to meet Chimo's senpai, Misano Fuji. After the trip, Riho assures Fū of her worries.
9	"The Melancholy of Momoneko-sama"; Transliteration: "Momoneko-sama no Yuuutsu, na no de" (Japanese: ももねこさまの憂鬱、なので)	November 28, 2011
9	"A Broken-hearted Camera"; Transliteration: "Shitsunen Camera, na no de" (Japanese: 失恋カメラ、なので)	November 28, 2011
Momoneko, the pink cat who wanders around the city, has trouble dealing with a wild boar who's been eating people's vegetables. However, after some invigorating words from Fū and co, Momoneko manages to get rid of the boar with help from Kou. Later, a woman named Shimako Tobita goes on a food binge after being rejected by a boy she liked and ends up having to spend the night at Fū's place. Sayomi decides to cheer her up by taking her and the others on another expedition, where her best friend Manami Hoshi helps her let out her feelings.
10	"What Will the Me of Tomorrow Be Like?"; Transliteration: "Ashita no Watashi wa Donna Watashi, na no de" (Japanese: 明日のわたしはどんなわたし、なので)	December 5, 2011
Kaoru feels a bit downhearted when the others have plans for Sunday, as she is unsure what she wants to be in the future. The others try to invite her to their plans, but she rejects them, leading everyone to become worried. Come Sunday, as the girls send texts to Kaoru, Sayomi arranges a little gettogether in the afternoon, where everyone gives their support for Kaoru. Having read the texts earlier, Kaoru decides she wants to set up an exhibition at the end of the year which makes use of everyone's talents.
11	"A Christmas Eve Story♪"; Transliteration: "Seiya no Monogatari♪, na no de" (Japanese: 聖夜のものがたり♪ なので)	December 12, 2011
As the girls prepare for the upcoming exhibition, Maon decides she wants to do a play recital. Despite deciding she wants to do an original story, she hasn't been able to come up with anything. As she struggles to come up with something, she feels pressured by all the people planning to attend. On the day of the exhibition, Maon still doesn't have an ending for her story, and becomes more anxious when she learns that is to perform her recital in the theatre she hoped to perform in due to the increasing number of attendees. Seeing her parents in the audience, Maon decides to perform anyway and, with encouragement from her friends and family, manages to make up an ending on the spot. Afterwards, the girls spend their Christmas at the spot where they unknowingly assembled back in 1999.
12	"A Brand New Year"; Transliteration: "Atarashī Hitotose, na no de" (Japanese: 新しいひととせ, なので)	December 19, 2011
The day of the exhibition comes and soon gathers a large audience. After the exhibition, the girls look over the surveys the guests filled in before seeing in the New Year together, where Fū also gets a call from Chihiro. On New Year's Day, Sayomi takes the girls on an expedition which comes to a halt when her car goes off the road. While waiting for their rescue, they get to see a special view brought on by the first sunrise of the year. As Fū takes a photo of everyone, she is reminded of her father.
5.5 (OVA)	"Memories of a Warm Breeze"; Transliteration: "Attakai Kaze no Omoide, na no de" (Japanese: あったかい風の想い出、なので)	June 27, 2012
As Fū is asked about needing a yukata for a fireworks festival, she recalls when she was younger and had her grandmother make a yukata for her. However, due to her father's death soon afterwards, she never got the chance to wear it. Back in the present, Chihiro invites Fū to come to a fireworks festival next year in Yokosuka, where she lived before moving to Takehara. Meanwhile, Fū's grandfather comes to visit, bringing all the failed photographs Fū took that her father had kept for her, along with an undeveloped roll of failed photos her father took. As Fū brings up needing a yukata, her grandmother reveals she had finished the one she asked for before, saving it for a time when Fū was ready to smile again. As the fireworks festival comes, Fū and the others receive a message from Sayomi saying the best place to view firework's is from Fū's house. After the firework's, Fū's mother explains to her how she got her name before everyone sends some photos to Chihiro. The next day, Fū receives the prints of her father's photos, revealed to be blurry photos of fireworks like hers.

=== Tamayura: More Aggressive (2013 TV series) ===
No.	Title	Original air date
1 (13)	"A Year Since I Was Welcomed Home"; Transliteration: "Okaerinasai no Ichinen ni, na no de" (Japanese: おかえりなさいの一年に、なので)	July 3, 2013
A year has passed since Fū moved to Takehara, and Fū and Kaoru reminisce about their reunion at that time and all the things that have happened since. As Fū becomes determined to be more aggressive this year, she receives an encouraging text from Chihiro. The next day, Fū states that she wants to start up a photography club when the new school year begins, receiving support from her friends, including Chihiro's classmate, Tomo.
2 (14)	"An Exciting New Step"; Transliteration: "Dokidoki no Atarashii Ippo, na no de" (Japanese: ドキドキの新しい一歩、なので)	July 10, 2013
As Fū worries about becoming a club president, Komachi brings in a magazine featuring a picture of Fū, submitted by a girl named Kanae Mitani. Dougou helps Fū get her photography club approved, assigning new teacher Mutsuko Shimokamiyama as the club's advisor. After eventually finding their new club room, Mutsuko informs Fū that Kanae is a student at their school. Following a congratularoty party held by the others and an awkward meeting with the other club presidents, Fū hears from the photo shop owner about how her father entered a lot of photo contests in his high school days, encouraging Fū to try her hardest. The next day, Kanae herself briefly appears before Fū at her clubroom.
3 (15)	"The Photography Club Truly Starts"; Transliteration: "Sashinbu Honkaku Shidō, na no de" (Japanese: 写真部 本格始動、なので)	July 17, 2013
After Kanae has hurriedly left the clubroom the other day, Fū's nervousness gets the better of her when she tries to promote the photography club to the freshmen. Meanwhile, Kaoru and the others encounter Kanae again, noticing that she has a camera. After receiving some encouragement from Sayomi and her mother, Fū decides she should try and convince Kanae to join the photography club. The next day, after Dougou asks Fū to help out with an upcoming cherry blossom festival, Fū chases after Kanae and invites her to the clubroom. Kanae explains that she had wanted to form her own photography club, but didn't have the confidence to start one herself. Moved by Fū's confidence and pictures, Kanae decides to join the photography club as an official member.
4 (16)	"A Special Place with Special Memories"; Transliteration: "Tokubetsu na Bashō, Tokubetsu na Omoi, na no de" (Japanese: 特別な場所, 特別な想い, なので)	July 24, 2013
Fū and Kanae are struggling to come up with a theme for their festival presentation, Dougou has plans to turn it into a musical performance. To give them some inspiration, the gang visit some cherry blossom trees that were planted for Kaori and Sayomi when they were little. As the festival gets underway, Fū searches for a tree from one of her father's photos. However, Dougou ends up injuring his hands, leaving him unable to perform for Fū's presentation. Despite this, Fū and Kanae work of the courage to perform by themselves. After the festival, Kou leads Fū to the trees planted in their names, having been led there by Momoneko, where Fū finds the exact spot her father took that photo from.
5 (17)	"For Tomorrow's Sake, Let's Photo!"; Transliteration: "Ashita no Tame ni Rettsu Foto, na no de" (Japanese: 明日のためにレッツフォト, なので)	July 31, 2013
Following a suggestion from Mutsuko, Fū and Kanae decide to enter a cherry blossom photography contest, but struggle to find any cherry blossom trees they can photograph. Hearing this, Sayomi takes the group on yet another trip. Whilst stopping to eat, Kanae talks about how she got into photography which led to that photo of Fū she took. Although they eventually come across a group of cherry blossom trees, Sayomi takes them even further to an even bigger cherry blossom tree. Despite Mutsuko inevitably forgetting to enter them into the contest, Fū and Kanae are proud with the photos they've managed to take.
6 (18)	"Looking for a Smile that Won't Come Again"; Transliteration: "Mō Todokanai Egao o Tazunete, na no de" (Japanese: もう届かない笑顔を訪ねて、なので)	August 7, 2013
Fū is visited by Riho, who brings along a travel planner named Harumi Kawai, who was an old acquaintance of Fū's father from before Fū was born. Wanting to learn more about her father, Fū goes with Harumi and Shihomi to Onmochi to help take pictures for a tour guide. Along the way, Fū hears from Harumi about how her father would always deviate from her plans and find fun things by going with the wind. They later stop at a bed & breakfast inn run by an old couple who tell Fū more about her father, who gave them advice about turning their house into a B&B. Later that night, as Harumi gives Fū a much belated congratulation of being born, Fū thanks her for helping her connect more with her father, inspiring Harumi that she should be more open and connected with her tours.
7 (19)	"Finally, Everyone's Together!"; Transliteration: "Tsuini, Minna de Kita yo! Na no de" (Japanese: ついに, みんなで来たよ! なので)	August 14, 2013
Fū and the others travel to her hometown of Shioiri, where they meet up with Chihiro and are introduced to Tomo, who is excited to finally meet Fū. Whilst taking a tour around Shioiri, Fū is filled with memories of her father. Later that night, the girls attend a summer festival where Fū recalls entering a sparkler contest when she was younger, prompting the group to enter themselves. As Fū makes it as far as the finals, she is reminded more of her father as Sayomi takes a picture of her.
8 (20)	"The Distant Promise Made That Day"; Transliteration: "Ano Hi no Tōi Yakusoku, na no de" (Japanese: あの日の遠い約束, なので)	August 21, 2013
Chihiro comes by to Takehara so she can watch their fireworks festival, swinging by the Photography Club to meet Kanae and Mutsuko. Whilst thinking about what to do for the festival, Fū and Chihiro recall a secret place Fū's father told them about when they were younger. The next day, Riho offers Fū and Kanae to have their photos shown in an exhibit. After Fū takes various photos of the festival preparations, Sayomi leads everyone to an ideal viewing spot, which Chihiro believes to be the secret place Fū's father talked about.
9 (21)	"The Bamboo Lantern in my Heart"; Transliteration: "Kokoro ni Tomosu Takeakari, na no de" (Japanese: 心に灯す竹あかり、なので)	August 28, 2013
As the town prepares for the bamboo festival, Fū meets a man named Nozomu Natsume, who was one of her father's classmates. Upon hearing Nozomu give some harsh critique on Fū's photos, Kanae can't help but express her love for Fū's photos. Later that day, Fū and Kanae run into Riho, who gives them advice on how the technical skills of photography shouldn't affect what's most important to the photographer. After encountering Nozomu again at the okonomiyaki shop, the girls take him to see the bamboo lanterns, where he talks about how Fū's father always put showing love in photographs over any technical prowess. Before he leaves, Nozomu asks Fū to take a picture of him.
10 (22)	"Until That Day Comes"; Transliteration: "Itsuka Kuru Sono Hi Made, na no de" (Japanese: いつかくるその日まで、なので)	September 4, 2013
Whilst preparing photos for Riho's exhibit, Kanae comes to realise it may very well be the last big event she'll do with the photography club before she graduates. Wanting to make as many memories as possible, Kanae suggests they all go on a photography trip, which conveniently ties in with Kaori's plans to hold another "We Exhibition" like last year and Maon's parents inviting them to Mitarai to attend a concert. Whilst exploring Mitarai with Fū, Kanae meets a woman, becoming awed by her singing. Curious about what she should do after graduation, Kanae asks Fū and the others about the turning points that got them interested in their career paths, worrying that she doesn't have a turning point of her own. Later at the concert, the woman Kanae saw before takes to the stage, who is revealed to be part of a band that inspired Maon to become an entertainer. This helps Kanae realise she already had a turning point; the day she joined the photography club.
11 (23)	"Thank You For Another Year"; Transliteration: "Kotoshi mo Arigatou, na no de" (Japanese: 今年もありがとう、なので)	September 11, 2013
The girls prepare for their We Exhibition on New Year's Eve, also the last day Kanae can be part of the photography club before she has to study for her exams. After receiving a special collage made by Chihiro and Tomo, Fū decides to have the photo Kanae took of her as the first photo people see upon entering the exhibit. The exhibit soon opens and draws in a large crowd, resulting in a great success. After seeing the new year in, Fū and Kanae emotionally reminiscing their time together in the photography club. Later, Sayomi takes everyone to the beach to watch the first sunrise of the new year, where Kanae lets out all of her feelings.
12 (24)	"And Thus, the Season of Departures Has Come"; Transliteration: "Soshite Tabidachi no Kisetsu, na no de" (Japanese: そして旅立ちの季節、なので)	September 18, 2013
After celebrating her father's birthday with her family, Fū discovers the shutter on her camera has stopped working and takes it in for repairs. Left without her camera for the day, Fū starts to worry that, someday, she will have to part ways with everyone. Noticing Fū feeling down, Tamae takes her for a motorcycle drive to where Fū's father proposed to her, telling her how her strength in coming to Takehara and taking up photography gave herself strength too. After getting her camera back, Fū and the others attend Kanae's graduation, where Fū gives her thanks to Kanae for a wonderful year spent with the photography club. Looking back over the past year, Fū gives her thoughtful thanks to everyone who made it possible.
8.5 (OVA)	"A School Trip For Just One Day"; Transliteration: "Tsuitachi Dake no Shūgakuryokō, na no de" (Japanese: 一日だけの修学旅行、なので)	June 14, 2014
Maon comes down with a fever, resulting in her missing the opportunity to go on a school trip to Okinawa with Fū and the others. When the girls pay her a visit once they return, Norie discovers a sketchbook that Maon was hoping to fill with memories of the school trip, crying when she notices it is completely blank. Noticing Maon also becoming upset over not being able to go, Fū suggests that everyone take her on another school trip just for them. The girls decide to go to Onomichi, where they participate in all the local tourist activities whilst Maon starts filling up her sketchbook. By the end of the day, Maon manages to completely fill in her sketchbook, thanking Norie for crying for her that time.

=== Tamayura: Sotsugyō Shashin (2015 Film series) ===
No.	Title	Release date
1	"Signs"; Transliteration: "Kizashi" (Japanese: 芽 -きざし-)	April 4, 2015
As Fu and her friends begin their third and final year of high school, the photography club gets two new members; freshman Takumi Shindou and sophomore Suzune Maekawa. Thinking about what to do after graduation, Fu decides she wants to pursue a career combining photography and travelling. Afterwards, Fu's family tell Fu about the time she took a picture of her father and first learned about "tamayura" from him. Later, as Chihiro and Tomo pay a visit for the Bamboo Festival, announcing that they plan to study abroad after graduation, Fu is shocked to learn that Riho is planning to leave town. During the festival the next day, as the girls get to see Kanae as part of Sayomi's explorer's club, Fu is approached by Riho, who explains she is going to Tokyo to open a gallery with her friend. Thankful for everything Riho has done for her, Fu promises the carry on her torch in pursuit of a career in photography.
2	"Echoes"; Transliteration: "Hibiki" (Japanese: 響 -ひびき-)	August 29, 2015
Norie swears off making sweets after her older brother Masanori doubts her ability to become a world famous patissiére, deciding to pursue another career. Wanting to express their love of Norie's sweets, Fu and the others decide to hold a fair as a farewell to Norie's sweet-making. Realizing how much she enjoys both making sweets and seeing people eaying them, as well as hearing Masanori's apology, Norie returns to doing what she loves. Later, as Kaoru has still yet to decide what career to pursue, Chimo announces she is getting married and asks girls for ideas for her reception. The girls pay a visit to a wedding the Maestro is doing photography for, where Kaoru becomes awed by the efforts of the wedding planner. After receiving some advice from Sayomi, who recalls how Kaoru once tried to walk all the way to Fu's house to cheer her up, Kaoru comes up with the perfect wedding plan for Chimo, who reveals that Dougou is to be her groom, deciding to aim for a job like a wedding planner that brings people happiness.
3	"Longing"; Transliteration: "Akogare" (Japanese: 憧-あこがれ-)	November 28, 2015
While discussing future careers, Maon becomes shocked when her father tells her she will not be allowed to take over their family's inn as he plans to close it down once he retires. Hoping to change his mind, the girls accompany Maon back to her home. Finding that Maon's father had broken his foot, Maon and the others help Maon's mother run the inn. That night, Maon overhears her parents talking and assumes that inn is in heavy debt. Thinking over this, Maon decides she wants to study economics in order to support the inn while still pursuing all of her other dreams. Although her parents soon reveal they aren't actually in debt, they stand by and support Maon's decision. Later at the bamboo lighting festival, as Fu sends her camera in for repairs again and worries about her future, she and the others meet up with Kanae and some of her college friends. Afterwards, Fu meets up with Natsume, who suggests that it is fine to accept help from others, though finds her camera is still being repaired. Worried that Fu has been acting strangely, Kaoru asks Chihiro for advice before confronting Fu, who expresses her true feelings in that she wants to be with Riho in Tokyo, but is scared of losing her camera and becoming separated from her friends.
4	"Tomorrow"; Transliteration: "Ashita" (Japanese: 朝-あした-)	April 2, 2016
Once Fu's camera is repaired, the other girls have a go with it, assuring Fu of new experiences that await and encouraging her to talk with both her family and Riho about studying in Tokyo. During the Christmas season, Kanae helps the girls study for their entrance exams before Sayomi takes everyone on a hiking trip to watch the first sunrise of the new year. Come January, Fu comes to stay with Chihiro as before taking her exams in Tokyo, after which she stops by Riho's gallery, where Riho offers to let Fu live with her if she passes. As everyone manages to pass their exams and together to hike up Mt. Asahi, Fu's camera permanently breaks after taking one last photo. Receiving a new digital camera from Natsume the same day, Fu brings all of her friends together to appear in its first photograph. Following graduation, everyone sees Fu off as she sets off for Tokyo. As everyone settles into their new routines, Fu keeps with her the last photo from her old camera and the first photo of her new one, both of which have tamayura.
