= İnci Türkay =

Turkish actress

- Born: July 15, 1972 (age 53); İzmir, Turkey
- Occupation: Actress
- Spouses: Ahmet Eroğlu (m. 2004; div. 2009) Atilla Saral (m. 2019)
- Children: 1

İnci Türkay (born July 15, 1972) is a Turkish actress and acting teacher. She is best known for playing "Betüş" in hit fantasy child series Sihirli Annem (2003-2012) and franchise animated child films "Köstebekgiller".

She completed her education in the theatre program at Hacettepe University Ankara State Conservatory, and later worked in the Trabzon State Theatre.

In 2001, she began her television career with "Dünya Varmış". Then, she acted the leading role in Sihirli Annem. She starred together with Nevra Serezli in this television series.

In 2004, she married a businessman named Ahmet Eroglu. She has a son named Ali. At the beginning of 2009, she established a toy store called "Tayga Toys". She divorced her husband in 2009. In September 2019, she married Atilla Saral, with whom she had been in a relationship for 11 years.

== Filmography ==
Film
Year	Title	Role	Notes
2013	Arkadaşım Max	Suna	The film was released in Turkey on June 7, 2013.
2013	Kızım İçin	Banu	The film was released in Turkey on December 6, 2013.
2015	Köstebekgiller: Perili Orman	Ceyda	The film was released in Turkey on January 23, 2015.
2016	Köstebekgiller 2: Gölge'nin Tılsımı	Ceyda	The film was released in Turkey on January 22, 2016.

Television
Year	Title	Role	Notes
1993	Ferhunde Hanımlar	Baby-sitter	Little role
2001	Dünya Varmış	Hülya	
2002	İki Oda Bir Sinan	Aslı	
2003–2006	Sihirli Annem	Betüş	Main cast
2009	Teyzanne	Eda - Zehra	
2010	Cuma'ya Kalsa	Şebnem	
2011–2012	Sihirli Annem	Betüş	Main cast
2012–2014	Köstebekgiller	Ceyda	
2016	Rengarenk	Zerrin	
