= List of Traffic Safety with Poli episodes =

Traffic Safety with Poli (Korean: 폴리와 함께하는 교통안전 이야기) is a spin-off of the South Korean Robocar Poli series. As part of Hyundai Motors' global corporate social responsibility project with RoiVisual and EBS, the series was produced for educating children on the importance of traffic safety, and has aired for two seasons. The first season of the spin-off was shown as six 11-minute episodes, in each of which two segments were combined into one episode.

== Series overview ==
Season	Episodes	Originally released	
Season	Episodes	First released	Last released
1	12	December 5, 2011	December 20, 2011
2	14	March 1, 2013	May 31, 2013

== Episodes ==
=== Season 1 (2011) ===
This season began on December 5 (with "Don't Imitate Jaywalking!"), and ended on December 20, 2011 (with "Making a Traffic Safety Map of Our Town"). The season contains 12 episodes.

No. overall	No. in season	Title	Original release date
1	1	"Don't Imitate Jaywalking!" (Korean: 무단횡단, 따라하면 안 돼요)	December 5, 2011
There is a half price sale on brand new robot toys in Brooms Town. The toy store is crowded with people. Kevin (Grey Griffin) happens to pass by with his mom, Sally (Lisa Ortiz) and his sister, Susie (Cristina Vee), and see people in the toy store from across the street. Kevin becomes impatient after he finds out that there are only a few robots left. Just then, Kevin sees an adult (Dan Green) jaywalking and tries to follow him to the store, letting go of his mom's hand and running into the road. Poli and Amber happen to be on patrol around the area and see Kevin in danger. Will Kevin be saved?
2	2	"Do This Way When Crossing at the Crosswalk" (Korean: 횡단보도를 건널 때는 이렇게)	December 5, 2011
Doug (Collin Dean) buys a stage beetle and Kevin buys a dinosaur toy for their friend Jenny's birthday. They start arguing about whose gift Jenny (Liliana Mumy) will like better. Finally, they decide to give their presents to Jenny and see for themselves which one she prefers. Kevin and Doug run towards Jenny's house to show her their presents as soon as possible. Meanwhile, Whooper (Kevin Michael Richardson) gets angry at Posty because she keeps blocking his way and gets even more angry after he gets a warning for a stop line violation from Poli. Whooper angrily speeds from a distance while Kevin and Doug wait for the green light to cross the street. Kevin and Doug run into the crosswalk right after the light changes, putting them right in Whooper's path! What will happen and will Kevin and Doug make it to the party?
3	3	"Getting On and Off the Bus Safely" (Korean: 승합차, 안전하게 타고 내리기)	December 6, 2011
Kevin and Doug are messing around and playing rough inside of SchoolB. Even though SchoolB asks them to remain seated, they keep playing and even start running around inside. Kevin gets off in a hurry because he is late for Tae Kwon Do and runs right into the road in his haste. Just then, Poli sees that Kevin is in trouble and moves to rescue him. Can Poli rescue Kevin this time?
4	4	"When You Face Cars in Alleys" (Korean: 골목길에서 자동차를 만나면)	December 6, 2011
Sally has made a strawberry pie for Mrs. Rora's birthday. She asks Kevin and Susie to deliver it to her because Cap has broken down and can't make it on time. Even though their mom tells them to go through Main Street to Mrs. Rora's house, Kevin and Susie decide to go through the alley because it will be faster. Kevin panics after he realizes that the road is so narrow that there is no clear line between the sidewalk and the car lanes. Meanwhile, Cap is fixed and rushes towards Kevin's house to supposedly run the same errand. He goes into the same alley and almost runs into Kevin and Susie, who are unable too see him because of another car in their way. Cap hits the basket in Susie's hand and the pie goes flying and gets ruined. Will Kevin and Susie get another pie for Mrs. Rora? Poli and Amber are moving into action!
5	5	"Blind Spots, the Invisible Danger" (Korean: 사각지대, 보이지 않는 위험)	December 12, 2011
Kevin, Susie, and Doug are playing hide and seek at the park. Doug is the seeker, so Kevin and Susie look for places to hide. Kevin hides behind the flowerbeds. When Susie tries to hide with him, Kevin tells her to go hide someplace else. Susie then makes a bad decision to hide under Titan while he's sleeping. Doug finds Kevin quickly, but is having a hard time finding Susie. Doug and Kevin desperately yell Susie's name, and Kevin eventually finds her. However, Titan wakes up from his nap and doesn't see Kevin and Susie as they're directly behind him. He starts his engine, scaring the children. Doug immediately calls for Poli's help. Will Poli save Kevin and Susie?
6	6	"Safety Tips on a Rainy Day" (Korean: 비 오는 날 안전수칙)	December 12, 2011
On a rainy afternoon after school, Kevin and Doug are playing with their umbrellas and Doug's gets broken by accident. They have no choice but to share Kevin's umbrella and have a hard time walking home because of the harsh weather. In front of a pedestrian crossing, Kevin and Doug are trying hard to cover themselves from rain by putting down the umbrella in front of their eyes. Because of this, Spooky is unable to see the children and loses control on the wet road. And Kevin and Doug don't see him either! At this critical moment, Poli shows up from nowhere. Can he save everyone?
7	7	"When You're with Your Family in a Car" (Korean: 가족이 함께 타는 차에서는)	December 13, 2011
Kevin's family are all excited about going on a trip to the amusement park in their car (Hyundai Sonata). However, they soon become tired after being stuck in the traffic caused by a car accident. Susie starts to nag because of being in a child restraint chair. Kevin, on the other hand, needs the restroom so urgently he opens the car door and runs into the road, where he is almost hit by Terry. Helly, patrolling over the accident scene in the sky, spots Kevin about to get hit, but fortunately Poli and Roy help Terry stop in time. Kevin and his family finally arrive at the park safely.
8	8	"My Ball Rolled into the Street!" (Korean: 공이 차도로 굴러 가 버렸어요)	December 13, 2011
Kevin is so excited about his new soccer ball. While playing a fun game of soccer with Doug, the ball accidentally rolls into the road and gets run over by Dump, causing it to pop. Kevin cries his eyes out and Dump feels terrible over what he did. He asks Poli for help and Poli gives advice. Kevin and Doug once again goes to play with the patched up ball as Sally warns them not to play near the road in an attempt to keep the ball intact. On their way to the park, they accidentally drop the ball and it rolls into the road again. Kevin panics and runs into the road to get the ball. Poli saves him right before he gets hit by Cap and teaches the boys a good lesson about safety. Although the ball is completely destroyed, Dump arrives with a new one, much to Kevin's delight.
9	9	"How to Ride a Bike Safely" (Korean: 자전거를 안전하게 타려면)	December 19, 2011
Sally gets Kevin a new bicycle with a basket, but it is not the type of bicycle he likes. Kevin, bitterly jealous of Doug's bicycle, challenges him to a race. However, Kevin's bicycle has not been adjusted yet and he has a hard time riding it. Kevin goes into the road in order to catch up with Doug but Titan comes speeding up behind him. Will Poli and Helly save Kevin from danger?
10	10	"Wear Bright Clothes When It's Dark" (Korean: 어두울 땐 밝은 옷을 입어요)	December 19, 2011
Kevin, Doug and Jenny decide to go into Owl Woods to watch the fireflies, but they find it rather hard and dangerous to find their way at night. On the other hand, Kevin's family finds out that he is missing and they panic. Poli finds a trace of Kevin and follows the kids into the woods. The kids get very excited when they get into a part of the woods where its easy to find fireflies. But Spooky, who's also in the woods, mistakes the children for a monster due to his headlights going out and tries to hit them. Poli fortunately gets there in time to save everyone. Poli and the Rescue Team teach the kids the safety tips about traveling at night and show them the fireflies before taking them home to their parents.
11	11	"Things to Do in Accidents" (Korean: 교통사고가 났을 때의 대처 방법)	December 20, 2011
Jenny is baking cupcakes for Kevin and Doug, who are coming over to her house to do homework. Doug doesn't want to miss the sweet treats, but he runs late due to guiding Mr. Musty to the hospital and helping get a kitten out of a tree. Doug is frantic and runs into the crosswalk when the light is flashing. Doug is lightly hit by a car and trips, hurting his knee, but is still in a hurry to get a cupcake, so he leaves the scene. The car looks for Doug, but he is nowhere to be found. Doug arrives at Jenny's late and is disappointed the cupcakes won't be served until their homework is done. Things get worse for him when Jenny discovers his injury. At that moment, Poli finds them after putting out a search for Doug and takes him to the hospital, while pointing out what he did wrong and telling him the correct procedure for the situation. Mr. Musty and the kitten's owner arrive to thank Doug for helping them.
12	12	"Making a Traffic Safety Map of Our Town" (Korean: 우리 마을 교통안전 지도 만들기)	December 20, 2011
Kevin, Doug and Jenny are doing their homework together. However, they are having trouble completing the assignment. They try asking their moms, the neighbor cars and the adult cars to help them finish, but no one knows how. Poli shows up in front of the disappointed kids and they ask him to help. The homework is to draw a traffic map of the town. Poli agrees and decides to help the kids with his Rescue Team members. They all go around the town learning about different safety tips with the help of flashbacks from previous episodes. They mark the dangerous places on the map and finish the map!

=== Season 2 (2013) ===
Season 2 began on March 1 (with "The Secret of Street Corners"), and ended on May 31, 2013 (with "I'm the Traffic Safety Quiz Champion!"). It contains 14 episodes.

No. overall	No. in season	Title	Original release date
13	1	"The Secret of Street Corners" (Korean: 길모퉁이의 비밀)	March 1, 2013
Kevin and Doug almost knock over a trash can until SchoolB alerts them
14	2	"Don't Play in the Parking Lot!" (Korean: 주차장에서 장난을 치면 안 돼요)	March 8, 2013
15	3	"Going on the Rides Safely" (Korean: 놀이기구 안전하게 타기)	March 15, 2013
16	4	"Don't Retrace Your Steps When Crossing the Street!" (Korean: 길을 건널 땐 되돌아가지 말아요)	March 22, 2013
17	5	"Pay Attention When You Walk" (Korean: 걸어갈 땐 한눈 팔지 말아요)	March 29, 2013
18	6	"Taking Bicycle Safety Tests" (Korean: 자전거 안전 시험)	April 5, 2013
19	7	"Safety Tips on a Snowy Day" (Korean: 눈 오는 날의 안전 수칙)	April 12, 2013
20	8	"It's Dangerous to Run Between Cars" (Korean: 차 사이로 뛰어가면 위험해요)	April 19, 2013
21	9	"Car Stories from My Dad" (Korean: 아빠가 알려 주는 자동차 이야기)	April 26, 2013
22	10	"Watch Out for Motorcycles!" (Korean: 오토바이를 조심해)	May 3, 2013
23	11	"When You Have to Pass by Construction Sites" (Korean: 공사장을 지나야 할 때에는)	May 10, 2013
24	12	"Be Sure to Fasten Your Seat Belt When Riding in a Car" (Korean: 차를 탈 땐 안전벨트를 꼭 매요)	May 17, 2013
25	13	"School Ways with Two Faces" (Korean: 두 얼굴의 학교길)	May 24, 2013
26	14	"I'm the Traffic Safety Quiz Champion!" (Korean: 내가 바로 교통안전 퀴즈왕)	May 31, 2013
