= List of B-Daman Crossfire episodes =

B-Daman Crossfire, known in Japan as Cross Fight B-Daman (クロスファイトビーダマン), is the first B-Daman anime of the Cross Fight series and the seventh B-Daman anime series, overall. Premiering on October 2, 2011, in Japan, it became the first B-Daman anime to air in almost five years, following the finale of Crash B-Daman on December 25, 2006. The series began airing on TV Tokyo in Japan starting October 2, 2011, and ended September 30, 2012.

The anime only takes up half an average time slot for a TV show in Japan, meaning that they only last around 11 minutes in a whole episode; however, in international airings two back-to-back episodes were connected to make an average time slot of 30 minutes.

== Episode list ==
No.	Translated English Title/English Dub Title Japanese Title	Original air date	English air date
1	"Did You Say ... B-Daman? (Part 1)" / "This is B-Daman?!"; Transliteration: "Kore ga bīdaman!?" (Japanese: これがビーダマン！？)	October 2, 2011	August 17, 2013
During class, Riki Ryugasaki looks over a book filled with world mysteries like valleys and pyramids, finding them quite interesting. His teacher, however, is not fond and takes away Riki's book as he is not paying attention in class. Riki offers his teacher to read it from page 95 but she declines and most of his classmates laugh at him although Riki does not understand. Riki later plays on the school playground "training" to one day embark on an adventure. He tells this to his only friend, Sumi Inaba, but she is actually interested in B-Daman. She shows her B-Daman to Riki and explains how it works. She inserts a B-Dama in the back of the figure's head and pushes the included Trigger to fire it. This fascinates Riki as Sumi then wants him to do something for her.They take a train to the toy shop, Miracle Shoot where Riki will voluntarily help out its owner, Akira Saiga as Sumi instead enters the "B-Daman Tournament". Akira notices Riki does whatever Sumi tells him to and likes it. He is glad Riki is here despite his former part-time employee suddenly leaving. Riki is also glad and plans on doing an amazing job with Akira. While Riki is busy retrieving stock for customers, Sumi enters the tournament as the sixth entrant in a challenge to knock six EZ Targets with her B-Daman, Lightning Rabbit - and she knocks all but one.
2	"Did You Say ... B-Daman? (Part 2)" / "This is Cross Fight!?"; Transliteration: "Kore ga kurosufaito!?" (Japanese: これがクロスファイト！？)	October 9, 2011	August 17, 2013
After hearing Thunder Dracyan speak, Riki Ryugasaki startles in confusion which alerts nearby B-Shots in the Crossfire facility. The girl who entered before confronts Riki and assures him they will not hurt him and introduces herself as Rury Takakura. She asks who he is and Riki introduces himself, while Dracyan also edges his own introduction in, proving to Riki he really was the one speaking. Riki then allows her to check Thunder Dracyan for a B-Animal, which she confirms as the Blue Dragon.
3	"Wait a Minute! He's the Champion!? (Part 1)" / "He's the Champion!?"; Transliteration: "Aitsu ga chanpion!?" (Japanese: あいつがチャンピオン！？)	October 16, 2011	August 24, 2013
After creating a hole in the field gate, Rury Takakura grants Riki Ryugasaki his gear, officially making him a Crossfire player. Rury warns Riki that Crossfire is a "secret tournament" and those who tell other people have their ID revoked which he understands.The next day at school when the bell rings, Riki looks at his Crossfire gear in class until Sumi Inaba pops in and asks where he has been lately. Sumi offers he go with her to Miracle Shoot as she wants new B-Daman parts but Riki declines and leaves. As a result, Sumi senses something odd going on.Back home, Riki is anxious for the next Crossfire tournament to begin as he wants to improve his sluggish score last time. Just then, his mother pops in to give him a snack but takes the food and pushes her out of his room; not wanting to tell her about the Crossfire secret. Thunder Dracyan tells Riki that he has questions for certain things. He does not know anything else, why he has a will or the meaning behind Crossfire. Riki assures him that they will solve this together and begin investigating.
4	"Wait a Minute! He's the Champion!? (Part 2)" / "Eh? First Record!?"; Transliteration: "E? Fāsutorekōdo!?" (Japanese: え？ファーストレコード！？)	October 23, 2011	August 24, 2013
Riki Ryugasaki asks Takakura why he created Crossfire and why his B-Daman, Thunder Dracyan can talk. Despite acknowledging his questions, Takakura tells Riki how he must become stronger to know the answers. Should he win a tournament one day, he will be answered. He wishes Riki good luck in this and ends his transmission. Soon, the remaining Crossfire competitors arrive as Rury announces their event.Giving each B-Shot their Crossfire gear, the goal is to accumulate the most points in this point-base event. First place is 100 points, second place is 50 points, third place is 30 points, fourth place is 20 points and fifth place is 10 points. Only these winners will earn points and shows a leaderboard depicting the B-Damans with the most points until now. Strike Avian is first, Lightning Fin second, Thunder Bearga third, Lightning Scorpio fourth and a brown Thunder Bearga fifth. Being in first place, he is Yuki Washimura who owns Strike Avian and introduces himself to Riki. He is subsequently called to play and bids him farewell.
5	"B-Animals? What Are Those? (Part 1)" / "Howl, B-Animal! " Transliteration: "Hoero B - animaru!" (Japanese: ほえろ B－アニマル！)	October 30, 2011	August 31, 2013
Takeru, Gouichiro, Shumon, Kaito, Yukihide went to Yukihide's family restaurant to discuss the secret of B-Animal.
6	"B-Animals? What Are Those? (Part 2)" / "Finish with a Triple Shot!!!"; Transliteration: "Kimero toripurushotto!!!" (Japanese: きめろトリプルショット！！！)	November 6, 2011	August 31, 2013
Takeru, Gouichiro, Shumon, Kaito, Yukihide went to an amusement park. Takeru discovered Shumon's fear of girls when Natsumi met the East Block B-Shots in amusement park. After Natsumi and the East Block B-Shots were stuck in a coffee cup ride, Takeru, Shumon, Gouichiro must find a way for the B-Daman work together to stop the ride.
7	"West City, Here We Come! (Part 1)" / "Go! West City!!"; Transliteration: "GO! Uesutoshiti!!" (Japanese: GO！ ウェストシティ！！)	November 13, 2011	September 7, 2013
The East Block B-Shots try to compete for the 2 spots for the inter-block tournament organized by WBMA chief. Although Kaito defeated Takeru for the number 2 position, Takeru was chosen as Yukihide's teammate. Meanwhile, Subaru and Reiji became the West Block team members.
8	"West City, Here We Come! (Part 2)" / "3...2...1... Cross Tag Fight!"; Transliteration: "3 2 1, Kurosutaggufaito!" (Japanese: 3・・・2・・・1、クロスタッグファイト！)	November 20, 2011	September 7, 2013
In the East Block vs West Block match, East Block team was defeated by the West Block team. After the match, Dracyan asked Dravise about B-Animal. Elsewhere, Ouga issues challenge against East Block Dracyan B-Shot after defeating Kaito in a B-Daman match.
9	"The Name's Leo! Thunder Leo! (Part 1)" / "Its Name is Leohjya!"; Transliteration: "Sononaha reōja!" (Japanese: その名はレオージャ！)	November 27, 2011	September 14, 2013
Ouga issues a challenge against East Block Dracyan B-Shot after defeating Kaito in a B-Daman match. Kakeru enters a park with B-Daman courses designed by Ouga. During Ouga vs. Kakeru's match, Ouga completed a course with all pins knocked out. In Kakeru's turn, he was unable to fire spin shot to hit pins hiding behind obstacles, so he moved around Dracyan to compensate. However, Kakeru's strategy broke Dracyan's core after knocked down the last pin. After the match, Yukihide challenges Ouga, but Ouga chooses to escape. In Saiga's shop, Saiga gives Kakeru and Natsumi new B-Daman parts, with a replacement core for Kakeru's Dracyan. Meanwhile, after Ouga uses a B-Daman terminal with Spin=Leohjya, Spin=Leohjya begins to talk.
10	"The Name's Leo! Thunder Leo! (Part 2)" / "Roar, Break Shot!"; Transliteration: "Unare bureikushotto!" (Japanese: うなれブレイクショット！)	December 4, 2011	September 14, 2013
After Spin=Leohjya began to talk, Ouga believes his passion turns Spin=Leohjya into a talking B-Daman. Meanwhile, Saneatsu asks Ruri to prepare Ouga for the Cross Fight tournament. At a secret meeting place, East Block B-Shots discovered Ouga also entered the Cross Fight tournament. In Seven Shots match, nobody from the East Block was able to knock down the 7th pin, including Yukihide and Gouichiro. When it is Kakeru's turn with replacement Break core, the glove charge was weakened before firing at the 7th pin, causing the marble to bounce off the 7th pin. While Kakeru moaned about the loss, Ouga was competing in Seven Shots match with enthusiasm with Spin=Leohjya. Kakeru remembered his past Cross Fight experience with Dracyan, then Kakeru apologized to Dracyan, followed by Dracyan apologizing to Kakeru. In a re-match, Kakeru and Dracyan knocked down the 7th pin with super shot. Ouga became desperate for fighting against B-Shot with dragon type B-Daman and challenged Subaru for B-Daman match, but Kakeru challenged Ouga for B-Daman match. Saneatsu decided to host a tournament between East Block and West Block members.
11	"Tune Up! Thunder Dracyan! (Part 1)" / "Here We Go! Metal Accele!!"; Transliteration: "Iku zo! Metaruakuseru!!" (Japanese: いくぞ！メタルアクセル！！)	December 11, 2011	September 21, 2013
Saneatsu announces the EW-Crossfire tournament, featuring all players from East and West blocks. In school, Kakeru submits a video to Yamashiro. Yamashiro suspected Kakeru found a different interest. Kakeru thought about the broken B-Daman core. Natsumi said there is someone who can fix the core. In Akira's shop, Akira unveiled a B-Daman repairing machine, and insisted on Kakeru repair the core with the machine. Kakeru, Shumon, Gouichiro, Yukihide, Kaito gathered in a street waiting for Ruri. Ruri appears in a limousine to deliver the B-Shots to World B-Daman Association. In World B-Daman Association, the B-Shots enter the EW-Crossfire Preliminary Arena, where each player has one chance to try each of the Power, Rapid Fire, and Control lanes, with the first 5 players completing all 3 games able to advance to the second round. Kakeru enters the match with the repaired core. Ouga enters the Power Lane.
12	"Tune Up! Thunder Dracyan! (Part 2)" / "Go! W-Super Shot!!"; Transliteration: "Ike! W sūpāshotto!!" (Japanese: いけ！Wスーパーショット！！)	December 18, 2011	September 21, 2013
In the 1st round of EW-Crossfire tournament, Kakeru reached Power Lane. Subaru completed the course first, followed by Ouga and Yukihide. Gouichiro completed the course after switching to rapid fire core. Kaito and Kakeru both finished 3 games and try to push the remaining button, but Kakeru narrowly pushed the last button earlier and entered the second round. In the Extreme Rush game, players were instructed to win by destroying 500 archer statue targets. Yukihide was ejected early for failing to destroy enough targets in time, followed by Gouichiro. After 30 seconds, Ouga realized he could not complete the game and stopped attacking, then he was ejected. After 50 seconds, Kakeru and Subaru tried to win the game using super shots. However, after the game ended with 60-second time limit, the match ended with Subaru with 497 points, followed by Kakeru with 493 points. After the tournament, Naoya and Force=Dragren entered the Extreme Rush game and got 853 points.
13	"Red Dragon? Who Is That Guy? (Part 1)" / "Who Is It? The Mysterious Red Dragon User..."; Transliteration: "Dareda? Nazo no reddo doragon tsukai…" (Japanese: 誰だ？ 謎のレッドドラゴン使い…)	December 25, 2011	September 28, 2013
14	"Red Dragon? Who Is That Guy? (Part 2)" / "Eh!? That Guy is a Transfer Student?" (Japanese: え！？アイツが転校生？)	January 8, 2012	September 28, 2013
15	"Dragon Tiger Combo! Mighty Dragren! (Part 1)" / "Dragon Tiger Combo: Perfect Dragren!" (Japanese: 龍虎合体 パーフェクト = ドラグレン！)	January 15, 2012	October 5, 2013
16	"Dragon Tiger Combo! Mighty Dragren! (Part 2)" / "The Strongest Control Type..." (Japanese: 最強のコントロールタイプ・・・)	January 22, 2012	October 5, 2013
17	"This is Break Bomber!? (Part 1)" / "This is Break Bomber!?" (Japanese: これがブレイクボンバー！？)	January 29, 2012	October 12, 2013
18	"This is Break Bomber!? (Part 2)" / "East VS West!" (Japanese: イースト VS ウェスト！)	February 5, 2012	October 12, 2013
19	"Camping, B-Shot Style! (Part 1)" / "Fun, B-Dacamp!" (Japanese: 楽しいビーダキャンプ！)	February 12, 2012	October 19, 2013
20	"Camping, B-Shot Style! (Part 2)" / "The Crimson Dragon's True Identity!" (Japanese: 赤き龍の正体！)	February 19, 2012	October 19, 2013
21	"Friendship Break Bomber! (Part 1)" / "The Break Bomber of Friendship!" (Japanese: 友情のブレイクボンバー！)	February 26, 2012	October 26, 2013
Subaru fired a super shot to destroy the block in the field where a match between Yukihide, Kakeru, Naoya, Daiki is taking place. Saneatsu said he ordered to Subaru to interrupt the match, and ordered to remove Naoya's Crossfire certification. Naoya threatened to reveal the secret of the WBMA operation. Saneatsu decided to settle the dispute with a Break Bomber game take place 3 days later, where Naoya would be banished from Crossfire if he loses. However, Naoya said if he wins, he would take control WBMA's Crossfire operation, and would confiscate all B-Daman from East Block players. At match day, Yukihide called Reiji under the guise of Daiki. When Reiji arrived at the arena, Yukihide challenged Reiji for a Break Bomber match. During the match, Yukihide asked why would Reiji follow Naoya. Reiji said he had already known Naoya's scheme, but Naoya had made him realize he could become stronger by hating everyone. Yukihide said the only way to become strong is not by hatred. After both players scored 2 points, Yukihide said he did not hate Reiji. After both players fired super shots, Yukihide lost the match. Reiji said he did not hate Yukihide. When Kakeru, Shumon, Kaito, Gouichirou went towards Yukihide and Reiji, Daiki appeared at the arena from behind. Yukihide discovered his B-Daman was cracked. Kaito said it would not be possible to repair it Steer=Eagle. Subaru volunteered to replace Yukihide. Saneatsu said a replacement can be made if opposing team does not object. Naoya approved the replacement.
22	"Friendship Break Bomber! (Part 2)" / "The Unbeatable Dragon Tag!!" (Japanese: 無敵のドラゴンタッグ！！)	March 4, 2012	October 26, 2013
23	"The East Champ is Revealed! (Part 1)" / "Who is it? East Champion!" (Japanese: 誰だ？イーストチャンピオン！)	March 11, 2012	November 2, 2013
The final match of the Crossfire season is approaching, so Riki and his friends start training very hard. The West Block champion is decided first and then it is time for the East Block championship to be held. Can Riki earn the chance to compete for the title of Overall Crossfire Champ?
24	"The East Champ is Revealed! (Part 2)" / "3, 2, 1...B-Final!" (Japanese: 3、2、1…B-ファイナル！)	March 18, 2012	November 2, 2013
25	"Crowning the Overall Champ! (Part 1)" / "Hold! Unified Championship" (Japanese: 開催！統一チャンピオン決定戦)	March 25, 2012	November 9, 2013
In a snow-covered city, Basara heard the voice of Twin=Drazeros. Basara entered a place where Twin=Drazeros lies. Twin=Drazeros said it was waiting. Basara if Twin=Drazeros was calling for him. Twin=Drazeros said they both possess great power, and they were always alone as a result. Basara picked up Twin=Drazeros. Twin=Drazeros fired super shot, shooting 2 marbles at once. In Miracle Shot, Kakeru was choosing a loader for Dracyan. Akira said Kakeru has become a veteran B-Shot. Kakeru said he should practice more and focus on faster reload, with a magazine holding lots of marbles. Dracyan agreed. Kakeru was surprised. Natsumi and Akira heard Dracyan speaking. Kakeru said he had frog in his throat, then he left shop. In a meeting at a street corner outside shop, Kakeru said Dracyan was uncharacteristically speaking in front of Natsumi and Saiga. Dracyan said he was thinking about the match, and had forgotten where it was. Kakeru said he had done the same. Kakeru said he was preoccupied with the championship match, and he got into trouble with teacher and his mother. Dracyan said Riki felt the same way as Dracyan. Behind Kakeru, Natsumi discovered Dracyan can speak. Dracyan said they should do their best so they have no regrets. In the championship match arena, Ruri said North and South blocks could not hold competitions, so the championship match would be between East and West leagues. Kakeru, Thunder?=Dracyan, Subaru, Rev?=Dravise entered arena. A Break Bomber table was lifted from stage. Saneatsu announced a 3-round Break Bomber game where the first player winning 2 rounds wins the match, but the game was different from before. Ruri fired at 5 middle column bombs with Steer=Swallow, but the yellow bombs stay intact. Ruri said the bomb on the field can be removed by hitting it with a marble. Yukihide said Kakeru had played the Break Bomber game with intact bombs. Saneastsu said the winner can face the B-Crystal that controls the source of all B-Daman. Gouichirou asked what did Saneatsu mean by facing. Saneastsu said the detail would be given after choosing a winner. Dravise and Dracyan were each attached to a funnel and rail loaders respectively. In round 1, Subaru fired marbles in horizontal formations, knocking 2 rows of 5 yellow bombs to Kakeru's side. Dracyan said Subaru and Dravise seemed to have a special bond. Dracyan fired a super shot to knock out the yellow bombs. Kakeru fired 2 shots, then Subaru fired 2 shots. Kakeru's marble knocked yellow bombs to Subaru side, then 2 more shots were fired by Subaru. After the yellow bombs were cleared, 2 marbles from Subaru knocked 2 red bombs to Kakeru side. Subaru fired 2 more shots to knock 1 yellow and 1 red bombs from middle column to Kakeru side, defeating Kakeru. Subaru told Dravise not to underestimate Kakeru's strength. In round 2, Subaru fired marbles in horizontal formation, knocking 1 row of 5 yellow bombs to Kakeru's side. Kakeru fired back in horizontal formation to remove the bombs in his side. Subaru fired marbles in horizontal formation, knocking another row of 5 yellow bombs to Kakeru's side. Kakeru fired back in horizontal formation to remove the bombs in his side. Dravise said Kakeru and Dracyan had a plan. Subaru said Kakeru lost some time after removing a bomb. After Subaru firing 5 shots to knock 4th row of 5 yellow bombs to Kakeru's side, Kakeru fired 2 shots to remove 4 yellow bombs in Kakeru's field, leaving only 1 yellow bomb in the middle, then the marbles bounced backward. Subaru fired 2 shots, then the marbles fired by Kakeru rolled forward, with each marble knocking 2 red bombs to Subaru's side, defeating Subaru. Dravise said Kakeru used a drive shot to hit 2 at once. Dravise said Dracyan's new core seemed extremely powerful and steady, so the drive rotation was highly increased. Subaru said the nature of the B-Shot was also very important for drawing out B-Daman's abilities. Subaru said Kakeru seemed to have grown into a completely different person. Basara and Twin=Drazeros appeared outside WBMA building. Basara said they had not exchanged names yet. Kurofuchi Basara and Twin=Drazeros introduced each other.
26	"Crowning the Overall Champ! (Part 2)" / "End of the Fierce Battle..." (Japanese: 激闘の果てに…)	April 1, 2012	November 9, 2013
B-Da RYU said both Kakeru and Subaru had each won 1 round, and the winner of 3rd round would become the overall champion. Ruri told the audience say the starting call. Kakeru fired 1 shot to knock 1 row of 2 yellow bombs to Subaru's side. Subaru fired 3 shots to knock a row 3 yellow bombs to Kakeru's side. Kakeru fired 1 shot to knock 1 yellow bomb in the middle to Subaru's side, then the marble bounce back to the middle bomb of the 3 yellow bombs at Kakeru's side, then the marble knock 2 yellow bombs to Subaru's side. Subaru moved left and fired 2 shots to knock a row of 2 yellow bombs to Kakeru's side. Subaru fired 4 shots to knock a row of 2 yellow bombs and a row of 2 red bombs to Kakeru's side with 1 marble hitting 1 bomb, while Kakeru fired 2 shots to knock a row of 2 yellow bombs and a row of 2 red bombs to Kakeru's side with 1 marble hitting a row of 2 bombs. B-Da RYU said both competitors got 2 points at the same time. Subaru fired 1 shot to knock a yellow bomb to Kakeru's side, leaving only 1 red bomb in the middle column, then 1 marble from each side hit the red bomb simultaneously, leaving the red bomb in place. Subaru and Kakeru were panting. Kakeru told Dracyan to use a new move. Dravise said Kakeru and Dracyan still have a new unseen special move. Kakeru used the new super shot at the red bomb. Subaru fired at the red bomb in quick successions, but the red bomb stayed in place. After Kakeru's super shot hit rebound and hit the red bomb the 3rd time, the red bomb stayed in place. Kakeru discovered the new move was not working. After Kakeru's shot hit the red bomb the 4th time, Subaru's rapid fire began to nudge the red bomb towards Kakeru's side. Kakeru managed to move the red bomb back to neutral position with successive shots. B-Crystal started to glow, then Dravise and Dracyan started glowing. Dracyan said B-Crystal is responding to the battle. Kakeru remembered Saneatsu had mentioned the winner's reward. Kakeru thought the greatest B-Daman mystery depended on this match. Kakeru started to glow. Dracyan said Kakeru and Dracyan were one heart and mind, so Kakeru can turn his spirit into power. Kakeru fired the old super shot, then Subaru fired super shot. The red bomb stayed in place. Subaru fired 5 shots, then the marble fired by Kakeru bounced back and roll towards the red bomb. The red block knocked toward Subaru's side. Ruri announced Kakeru as winner. Kaito, Yukihide, Shumon, Gouichirou ran towards Kakeru. B-Da RYU announced the winners of the match and overall champions as Kakeru and Thunder? Dracyan. Kaito, Yukihide, Shumon, Gouichirou threw Kakeru into the air. Subaru asked why had they lost. Dravise said they had only paid attention to Kakeru and Dracyan, but Kakeru saw also looked at what was beyond end of the fight. Dravise said the strength of Kakeru's spirit, which needs to know the secret of the B-Crystal, gave him that power. At the podium, Kakeru and Subaru were at 1st and 2nd ranks respectively. Kakeru said since he had won, Subaru would accept him as a rival. Subaru said the one in the lead should act like a leader and not hesitate. Dracyan said it seems things would not really change between Kakeru and Subaru. An emergency announcement said an intruder is in the secret underground area, and B-Crystal was under attack. In SB floor, Basara and Twin=Drazeros hovered around B-Crystal on a gyro-balancer. Basara fired at B-Crystal with Twin=Drazeros. Saneatsu asked what happened and the security system. Emergency announcer said the security guard were defeated by an unknown boy, and the unknown boy's B-Daman took out the security system. Ruri said someone was facing B-Crystal. Subaru and Kakeru ran off. After Basara had reloaded marbles, Subaru and Kakeru appeared from behind on a bridge under Basara. Basara asked what did Subaru and Kakeru want. Twin=Drazeros said they were not worth the attention. Basara aimed at B-Crystal, then Subaru aimed at the gyro-balancer. Dravise said breaking the gyro-balancer would cause it to enter emergency landing mode. Subaru said only Kakeru is worthy to face the B-Crystal. Kakeru aimed at the gyro-balancer. ? said Saneatsu must implement the system. Ruri said the system was to be used after solving the mystery of B-Crystal. Kakeru and Subaru each fired 1 shot, but missed Basara. Basara fired 2 marbles at B-Crystal. Twin=Drazeros told Basara to use special move. Basara tried to reload Twin=Drazeros, but Basara ran out of marbles. Dravise said Basara was out of marbles, but Dracyan discovered there are marbles on Twin=Drazeros. Basara reloaded Twin=Drazeros with the 2 marbles on Twin=Drazeros. Twin=Drazeros fired super shot with 2 marbles at B-Crystal. B-Crystal started to pulsate. ? said the dragon king would awake, and be entrusted to the true hero who faces it. Saneatsu it was already too late, and ordered to activate super-speed elevator. Dracyan said it had felt B-Crystal's anger. Twin=Drazeros said their work is done. Basara and Twin=Drazeros escaped. WBMA building started to glow upwards, then the roof cracked and shattered. The B-Crystal emerged from the ceiling and shoot a beam upwards, with streams of light scattered from B-Crystal to its surroundings. A scattered light stream entered a B-Daman, then the B-Daman glowed. Elsewhere, B-Damans started to glow. In Miracle Shot, Natsumi said it must just be her imagination. Akira agreed, and said it was impossible for Dracyan to speak. Natsumi said she knew. Light streams entered a case with B-Damans, then the B-Damans started to glow and speak. Akira said the B-Daman just spoke. Natsumi remembered her prior encounter with Dracyan. ? said it continued to grow out of control. Saneatsu decided to make the existence of Crossfire public. A growing dragon flew into planetary orbit and fell. Dragren asked if Naoya know where it fell. Naoya said he know the location by calculating its precise point of impact that the time came to wake up Drazeros. Naoya and Dragren appeared at a cliff. A stream of light appeared at above from the sky in front of Naoya and Dragren. Naoya said this is a whole new story, and it is just the beginning.
27	"Crossfire is... Can it be true? (Part 1)" / "Eh? It's Cross Fight!" (Japanese: え？まさかクロスファイトが！)	April 8, 2012	November 16, 2013
28	"Crossfire is... Can it be true? (Part 2)" / "A New Opening! B-Daman from Warring States Era" (Japanese: 新たな開幕！ビーダマン戦国時代)	April 15, 2012	November 16, 2013
29	"The Incomparable Jaku! (Part 1)" / "The Unmatched Jacker!" (Japanese: 比類なきジャッカー！)	April 22, 2012	November 23, 2013
30	"The Incomparable Jaku! (Part 2)" / "Fierce Fight! East GP" (Japanese: 激闘！イーストGP)	April 29, 2012	November 23, 2013
31	"Calling All New B-Shots! (Part 1)" / "Assemble! The Future of B-Daman" (Japanese: 集まれ！未来のビーダーたち)	May 6, 2012	November 30, 2013
32	"Calling All New B-Shots! (Part 2)" / "Compete with Asuka!! Break Bomber" (Japanese: アスカと勝負!!ブレイクボンバー)	May 13, 2012	November 30, 2013
33	"The Wild Wild West GP! (Part 1)" / "Burst! The Opening of West GP" (Japanese: ボンバー！勝つのはどっちだ!?)	May 20, 2012	December 7, 2013
34	"The Wild Wild West GP! (Part 2)" / "Bomber! Who will be the Winner?" (Japanese: ボンバー！勝つのはどっちだ!?)	May 27, 2012	December 7, 2013
35	"Brutal Bitter Blizzard Battle! (Part 1)" / "Duel in the Blizzard..." (Japanese: ブリザードの決闘…)	June 3, 2012	December 14, 2013
36	"Brutal Bitter Blizzard Battle! (Part 2)" / "Confrontation on a Snowy Evening! Jacker VS Drazeros" (Japanese: 雪の夜の対決！ジャッカーVSドラゼロス)	June 10, 2012	December 14, 2013
37	"The Mystery Of The Ruins (Part 1)" / "Mystery in the Ruins... " (Japanese: 遺跡の中はミステリー…)	June 17, 2012	December 21, 2013
38	"The Mystery Of The Ruins (Part 2)" / "The Legendary Dragon Type!" (Japanese: 伝説のドラゴンタイプ！)	June 24, 2012	December 21, 2013
39	"Enter Dragold! The North Grand Prix! (Part 1)" / "Dragold's Participation! North GP" (Japanese: ドラゴルド参戦！ノースGP)	July 1, 2012	January 9, 2014 (online)
40	"Enter Dragold! The North Grand Prix! (Part 2)" / "Terrifying! The Power of the Golden Dragon" (Japanese: 戦慄！ゴールドドラゴンの力)	July 8, 2012	January 9, 2014 (online)
41	"Smash Dragold! (Part 1)" / "Defeat! Smash=Dragold" (Japanese: 打倒！スマッシュ・ドラゴルド)	July 15, 2012	January 9, 2014 (online)
42	"Smash Dragold! (Part 2)" / "Bond of the Double-Shot!!" (Japanese: 絆のダブル・ショット!!)	July 22, 2012	January 9, 2014 (online)
43	"The Search for the Mysterious B-Daman! (Part 1)" / "Hunt! The Mystery of B-Daman's Secluded Region" (Japanese: 追え！謎の秘境ビーダマン)	July 29, 2012	January 9, 2014 (online)
44	"The Search for the Mysterious B-Daman! (Part 2)" / "Mystery! The Enigmatic Ancient B-Daman" (Japanese: ミステリー！超古代ビーダマンの謎)	August 5, 2012	January 9, 2014 (online)
45	"The Ultimate Hammer Smash! (Part 1)" / "The Deadly Dragonic Hammer!" (Japanese: 必殺のドラゴニック・ハンマー！)	August 12, 2012	December 28, 2013
46	"The Ultimate Hammer Smash! (Part 2)" / "St. Naruchikara's Miraculous Call" (Japanese: 聖ナルチカラが呼ぶ奇跡)	August 19, 2012	December 28, 2013
47	"Watch Out! Rudy's Run Amok! (Part 1)" / "Heat Up! Ryuji's Rampage" (Japanese: ヒートアップ！リュウジ暴走!!)	August 26, 2012	January 4, 2014
48	"Watch Out! Rudy's Run Amok! (Part 2)" / "Extreme Fight! Novu VS Ryuji" (Japanese: 激ファイト！ナオヤVSリュウジ)	September 2, 2012	January 4, 2014
49	"The Complete Dragon King! (Part 1)" / "The Perfect Dragon King!" (Japanese: 完全なる龍王！)	September 9, 2012	January 11, 2014
50	"The Complete Dragon King! (Part 2)" / "Head-On Match! Dracyan VS Dragren!!" (Japanese: 真っ向勝負！ドラシアンVSドラグレン!!)	September 16, 2012	January 11, 2014
51	"This is it, The Final Match! (Part 1)" / "Here We Go! Final Match"; Transliteration: "Iku zo! Fainarumatchi" (Japanese: いくぞ！ ファイナルマッチ)	September 23, 2012	January 18, 2014
52	"This is it, The Final Match! (Part 2)" / "Conclusion! Cross Fight's New Era"; Transliteration: "Ketchaku! Kurosufaito shinseki" (Japanese: 決着！クロスファイト新世紀)	September 30, 2012	January 18, 2014
