= Cille (TV series) =

- Genre: Animated series Comedy; Adventure
- Developed by: Çağrı Cem Bayraklı
- Written by: Ali Hakan Kaya; Arif Sağlam; Mecit Güven; Murat Özyer
- Directed by: Çağrı Cem Bayraklı
- Voices of: Ahmet Taşar; Savaş Pat; Ali Hekimoğlu; Elif Erdal; Pelin Gülmez; Gizem Gülen; Gazanfer Ündüz; Osman Gidişoğlu; Alayça Gidişoğlu; Didem Atlıhan; Emre Törün; Mustafa Oral; Barış Kozan
- Narrated by: Emrullah Uzun
- Theme music composer: Barış Kırımşelioğlu
- Country of origin: Turkey
- Original language: Turkish
- No. of seasons: 5
- No. of episodes: 66 (list of episodes)

Production
- Running time: 25-26 minutes
- Production company: CORDOBA

Original release
- Network: TRT Çocuk
- Release: 1 January 2011 – 4 September 2019

Cille is a Turkish animated series that airs on the TRT Çocuk broadcast channel.

The plot of Cille revolves around a group of young friends who discover an old mystery in their little town. They find surprising ties to their own past and hidden secrets as they delve deeper. They get closer to cracking the mystery with every episode, picking up insightful lessons about bravery, friendship, and cooperation in the process.

The 12 Legendary Cilles are (with Character first followed by the element):

- Behmut - Water and secret power of space
- Alşimist - Water
- Harkas - Water
- Buzor - Earth
- Dessas - Earth
- Nirumend - Earth
- Semender - Fire
- Anka - Air
- Aydakar - Fire
- Senmurv - Fire
- Peleng - Air
- Umay - Air

Non Legendary Cilles

- Akper - Air
- Lenduha - Earth
- Sureta - Water and Copy
- Mazmaza - Water
- Anut - Earth
- Sebenta - Earth
- Cariha -Earth and Air (Lightning)
- Kabkaba - Fire (Darkness)
- Suban - Fire (Darkness)
- Akuran - Earth
- Şarkan - Earth
- Susmar - Air and Earth (Lightning)
- Murassa - Earth
