= Zumbastico Fantástico =

- Genre: Black comedy Slapstick; Surreal comedy
- Developed by: TVN
- Country of origin: Chile
- No. of seasons: 1
- No. of episodes: 20

Production
- Running time: 30 minutes (3 7 minutes segments)
- Production company: Zumbastico Studios

Original release
- Network: TVN (Chile); Cartoon Network (Latin America); Canal 22 (Mexico); Netflix (Latin America)
- Release: November 1, 2011 – February 24, 2012

Zumbastico Fantastico is a Chilean animation series broadcast by TVN and Cartoon Network Latin America. A showcase style show (as Cartoon Network's What A Cartoon Show), it contains different original animated shorts in every episode. Created and developed by Zumbastico Studios, co-produced with TVN and directed by Alvaro Ceppi. The series premiered on Cartoon Network Latin America from November 1, 2011.

5 different shows (with 6 shorts each) were showcase in the series:

- "Piggy-Doggy" ("Chanchiperri"), created by Bernardita Ojeda: It is about a cross between a pig and a dog that lives in the town of Goodness together with his assistant Perrichan, they will try to end the love of their town.
- "The League of Semi-Heroes" ("La liga de los semi-heroes"), created by Claudio "Guayi" Mas: A group of three pre-adolescents who seek to be superheroes, follow the orders of General Cochijunti, who always gives them simple and not dangerous missions.
- "Edgar's Amazing Navel" ("El sorprendente ombligo de Edgar"), created by Pablo Castillo: Edgar, a boy who by not washing his navel has created a strange world within himself.
- "Telonio and his Demons" ("Telonio y sus demonios"), created by Sol Díaz: Telonio is a boy who is good at playing Jazz, he is in love with his partner Melodia and the demons that live in his head commonly lower his self-esteem.
- "Pepe, a square in a round world" ("Pepe, un cuadrado en un mundo redondo"), created by Alvaro Ceppi: Pepe is a square who lives in a circular city, so he has to deal with the circle people.
