= Carrapatos e Catapultas =

Brazilian animated cartoon

Carrapatos e Catapultas, sometimes translated as Duck-Ticks and Catapults, is a Brazilian animated cartoon series produced by the project Anima TV.

The program is a co-production of Elephant Zoom Studio with TV Brasil and the TV Cultura. It was one of two winners of a contest organized to support the creation of Brazilian series.

Series creator and writer Almir Correia, has as his main influences cartoon surrealist comedy such as Rocko's Modern Life and SpongeBob SquarePants, as well as science-fiction series.

The first season of Ticks and Catapults had 14 episodes, made for children aged 8 to 12. Through a mood based on innocent language, the series aims to make young people enjoy and think about issues relevant to their day-to-day lives.

== Synopsis ==
Ticks and Catapults presents the adventures of ticks with duck beaks named Bum, Bod, Sweepstake and Quietly, who are all friends. On their planet, ticks are born with parachutes and they travel by catapult.

== Characters ==
- Bum - The main character, a yellow tick. Different from other ticks. He has a calm personality and his best friends are Bum and Sweepstake. He is also responsible for Quietly, his younger cousin. At the end of each episode Bum gets a call from his parents.
- Bod - A green tick, best friend of Bum. Unlike him Bod has a sportier and hectic personality. His catchphrase is “Oh, oh, oh, ticks don't have fathers.”
- Sweepstake - A huge purple tick, friend of Bum and Bod. He is not very smart and often ends up doing the wrong thing.
- Quietly - A small beige tick, Bum's cousin. He is very busy and full of energy, and causes big problems. He went to live with Bum after his parents exploded. His favorite hobby is jumping from catapults, saying "I want to!"

=== Secondary ===
- Mother Bum - Bum's mother now in the afterlife. She often calls home at the end of episode commenting on the achievements made by Bum and his friends.
- Bonaparte - The boss of Bum, Bod and Sweepstake. Short and very nervous. It is a reference to Napoleón Bonaparte, wearing a similar hat.
- Paty - A passionate tick by Bum, works in Suganete. Several ticks are in love with her, though she is interested only in Bum. In one episode two aliens shoot a ray leaving all ticks in love with her.
- Thick Severino - A singer tick baião who lives in a floating stone. Always talking in rhymes, singing, playing accordion, and wearing a bandit hat with sunglasses. He is always in the company of Raimundinho, his triangle-playing assistant. It is a reference to Luiz Gonzaga.
- Doctor Froide (crazy doctor);
- Mrs. Anna (old tick);
- Leonard tick (the inventor);
- Splash (surfer tick);
- Tic and Tac (mobsters, conjoined twins, work for Gift Corleone);
- Gift Corleone (tick archenemy of Bonaparte);
- Super Hyper Mega Tick (superhero ticks);
- Pedracules (archenemy-friend) Super hyper mega tick.

== Dubbing ==
character	Dubber
Bum	Fábio Silvestre
Doctor Froide	Fábio Silvestre
Bod	Cyro Ridal
Sweepstake	Marccão Freire
Quietly	Enemar Passos
Gift Corleone	Enemar Passos
Mrs. Anna	Enemar Passos
Mother Bum	Priscilla Miquilussi
Bonaparte	João Batista de Lara
Pedráculos	João Batista de Lara
Paty	Kely Varela
Severino	Vadeco
Splash	Vadeco
Super Hyper Mega Tick	Vadeco
Leonard Tick	Fernando Kadlu
Tic and Tac	Fernando Kadlu

== Episodes ==
Season	Episodes	Original airing	
Season	Episodes	Debut	Ending
1	14	August 4, 2011	April 15, 2012
2	13	July 8, 2015	February 1, 2016
3	13	January 1, 2018	March 7, 2018

== Streaming ==
Nation	Station	Title	Primeira Transmissão
Brazil	TV Brasil	Carrapatos e Catapultas	April 17, 2010
Brazil	TV Cultura	Carrapatos e Catapultas	April 23, 2010
Brazil	Cartoon Network	Carrapatos e Catapultas	February 18, 2012
Brazil	Tooncast	Carrapatos e Catapultas	June 2013
Argentina	Tooncast	Garrapatas y Catapultas	June 2013
Paraguay	Tooncast	Garrapatas y Catapultas	June 2013
Venezuela	Tooncast	Garrapatas y Catapultas	June 2013
Uruguay	Tooncast	Garrapatas y Catapultas	June 2013
Panama	Tooncast	Garrapatas y Catapultas	June 2013
Mexico	Tooncast	Garrapatas y Catapultas	June 2013
Bolivia	Tooncast	Garrapatas y Catapultas	June 2013
Peru	Tooncast	Garrapatas y Catapultas	June 2013
Puerto Rico	Tooncast	Garrapatas y Catapultas	June 2013
Colombia	Tooncast	Garrapatas y Catapultas	June 2013
Honduras	Tooncast	Garrapatas y Catapultas	June 2013
Ecuador	Tooncast	Garrapatas y Catapultas	June 2013
Chile	Tooncast	Garrapatas y Catapultas	June 2013
Costa Rica	Tooncast	Garrapatas y Catapultas	June 2013
