= Minami Tsuda =

Japanese voice actress

- 津田 美波
- Born: Kanagawa Prefecture, Japan
- Education: Aoni Juku
- Occupation: Voice actress
- Years active: 2009–present
- Agent: Aoni Production
- Notable work: YuruYuri as Yui Funami; Citrus as Mei Aihara; Shinkansen Henkei Robo Shinkalion Z as Shin Arata; Aikatsu Stars! as Hime Shiratori; Amagi Brilliant Park as Salama; Guilty Crown as Shū Ouma; Pretty Rhythm: Dear My Future as Karin Shijimi; ID-0 as Maya Mikuri; Xenoblade Chronicles 3 as Mio
- Height: 156 cm (5 ft 1 in)
- Spouse: Tatsumaru Tachibana (m. 2024)

Minami Tsuda (津田 美波, Tsuda Minami) is a Japanese voice actress from Kanagawa Prefecture, Japan. She is affiliated with Aoni Production.

== Early life and career ==
Since she was eight years old, Minami Tsuda was fascinated with voice acting as she was influenced by her sister and grew from watching Sailor Moon and Pokémon. At the age of 10, she joined a choir, where she met actress and singer Eri Itō as her instructor for the next eight years. After graduating from high school, Tsuda quit the choir and attended Aoni Juku, the voice acting school of the talent agency Aoni Production, in Tokyo upon the recommendation of voice actress Michie Tomizawa.

Tsuda's first voice role was recorded incoming voices on mobile phones. In 2009, she took the role of Shige in Nintama Rantarō Musical, a musical theater performance based on the anime series of the same name.

== Filmography ==
=== Anime TV series ===
List of voice performances in anime TV series
Year	Title	Role	Notes	Ref.
2010	Rainbow: Nisha Rokubō no Shichinin	Shigeo	Episodes 18–19	
2010	Pocket Monsters: Best Wishes!	Iris' Axew	Also voiced Erina (episode 51) and Momotchi (episode 80)	
2011	Fractale	Phryne		
2011	A Channel	Middle Schoolgirl A	Episode 5	
2011	YuruYuri	Yui Funami		
2011	Guilty Crown	Shū Ōma (child)	Also voiced Jun Samukawa (episode 9) and Ritsu Takarada (episodes 16–18)	
2011	Sket Dance	Sakiko Takashima	Episode 33	
2012	Inu x Boku SS	Kotarō Kawasumi		
2012	High School DxD	Siris	Episodes 5, 8, 11	
2012	Smile PreCure!	Kiyomi Onōshiro		
2012	Pretty Rhythm: Dear My Future	Karin Shijimi		
2012	Saki Achiga-hen episode of Side-A	Hatsuse Okahashi	Episodes 2–3, 6	
2012	Accel World	Michiru Mita	Episode 4	
2012	Eureka Seven AO	Shokuin Josei	Episode 5 (credited as "Female Staff")	
2012	Pocket Monsters: Best Wishes! Season 2	Iris' Axew		
2012	YuruYuri♪♪	Yui Funami		
2013	Pocket Monsters: Best Wishes! Season 2: Episode N	Iris' Axew		
2013	Yuyushiki	Yui Ichī		
2013	A Certain Scientific Railgun S	Junko Hokaze	Episode 1 (credited as "Female Student A")	
2013	Pocket Monsters: Best Wishes! Season 2: Decolora Adventure	Iris' Axew		
2013	Ro-Kyu-Bu! SS	Tsubaki Takenaka		
2013	Fantasista Doll	Sasara		
2013	Arpeggio of Blue Steel -Ars Nova-	Iori Watanuki		
2014	Wake Up, Girls!	Megumi Yoshikawa		
2014	Strike the Blood	Moegi Akatsuki	Episode 24	
2014	Hero Bank	Nanten Minami		
2014	M3: The Dark Metal	Minashi Maki (child)		
2014	Locodol	Misato Mizumoto		
2014	Himegoto	Servant No. 1		
2014	Momo Kyun Sword	Onihime		
2014	Amagi Brilliant Park	Salama		
2014	Denkigai no Honya-san	Sensei		
2014	Girl Friend Beta	Mutsumi Shigino		
2015	The Idolmaster Cinderella Girls (season 1)	Miho Kohinata		
2015	Classroom Crisis	Makoto Ryōke		
2015	My Wife is the Student Council President	Rin Misumi		
2015	The Idolmaster Cinderella Girls (season 2)	Miho Kohinata		
2015	YuruYuri San Hai!	Yui Funami		
2016	Pandora in the Crimson Shell: Ghost Urn	Proserpina		
2016	Nijiiro Days	Anna Kobayakawa	Also voiced a senior student (episode 18)	
2016	Aikatsu Stars!	Hime Shiratori		
2016	My Wife is the Student Council President!+!	Rin Misumi		
2017	Kemono Friends	Jaguar		
2017	ID-0	Maya Mikuri		
2017	Wake Up, Girls! New Chapter	Megumi Yoshikawa		
2018	Citrus	Mei Aihara		
2018	Death March to the Parallel World Rhapsody	Liza		
2018	Black Clover (season 1)	Sally		
2018	Tachibanakan To Lie Angle	Hanabi Natsuno		
2018	Comic Girls	Mayu Amisawa		
2018	Real Girl	Arisa Ishino		
2019	Boogiepop and Others	Sakiko Michimoto		
2019	Real Girl (season 2)	Arisa Ishino		
2019	Black Clover (season 2)	Sally	Episode 66	
2019	Aikatsu on Parade!	Hime Shiratori		
2020	A Certain Scientific Railgun T	Junko Hokaze		
2020	Assauly Lily Bouquet	Soraha Amano	Episodes 1–3	
2021	Suppose a Kid from the Last Dungeon Boonies Moved to a Starter Town	Riho Flavin		
2021	Redo of Healer	Norn Clatalissa Jioral		
2021	Shinkansen Henkei Robo Shinkalion Z	Shin Arata		
2021	Sakugan	Linda		
2022	Delicious Party Pretty Cure	Cerfeuil		
2022	Me & Roboco	Bondo Taira		
2023	Onimai: I'm Now Your Sister!	Momiji Hozuki		
2023	Skip and Loafer	Tokiko Takamine		
2023	The Ancient Magus' Bride (season 2)	Lucy Webster		
2024	Gushing over Magical Girls	Nemo Anemo/Leberblume		
2024	Metallic Rouge	Ace/Alice Machias		
2025	Even Given the Worthless "Appraiser" Class, I'm Actually the Strongest	Kurohime		
2025	I Was Reincarnated as the 7th Prince so I Can Take My Time Perfecting My Magical Ability (season 2)	Saria		
2025	With Vengeance, Sincerely, Your Broken Saintess	Diana Peridot		
2025	Hotel Inhumans	Ringo Ader		
2025	Spy × Family	Loid Forger (young)		
2026	I Made Friends with the Second Prettiest Girl in My Class	Miki Yagisawa		
2026	Nippon Sangoku	Ōga Wajima		
2026	Dara-san of Reiwa	Hinata Misogiya		
2026	Goodbye, Lara	Lisa		
2026	The Frontier Lord Begins with Zero Subjects	Canise		
2026	My Stepmother and Stepsisters Aren't Wicked	Chiyo Mitsunaka		
2026	Magical Explorer	Hatsumi Hanamura		

=== Original video animation (OVA) ===
List of voice performances in OVAs
Year	Title	Role	Ref.
2011	Toradora!: "The True Meaning of Bento"	Student A	
2014	YuruYuri Nachuyachumi!	Yui Funami	

=== Original net animation (ONA) ===
List of voice performances in ONAs
Year	Title	Role	Ref.
2016	Girl Friend Note	Mutsumi Shigino	
2019	Super Dragon Ball Heroes	Kamin	
2019	Squishy! Black Clover	Sally	

=== Anime films ===
List of voice performances in anime films
Year	Title	Role	Ref.
2010	Book Girl	Maika Inōe	
2011	Pokémon the Movie: Black—Victini and Reshiram	Iris' Axew	
2011	Pokémon the Movie: White—Victini and Zekrom	Iris' Axew	
2012	Pokémon the Movie: Kyurem vs. the Sword of Justice	Iris' Axew	
2012	Meloetta's Moonlight Serenade	Iris' Axew	
2014	Wake Up, Girls! - Seven Idols	Megumi Yoshikawa	
2015	Arpeggio of Blue Steel -Ars Nova DC-	Iori Watanuki	
2017	Girls und Panzer das Finale: Part 1	Ando	
2019	Girls und Panzer das Finale: Part 2	Ando	

=== Video games ===
List of voice performances in video games
Year	Title	Role	Ref.
2009	Kamen Rider: Climax Heroes	Kamen Rider Femme	
2009	Kamen Rider: Climax Heroes W	Kamen Rider Femme	
2010	Kamen Rider: Climax Heroes OOO	Kamen Rider Femme	
2011	Valkyria Chronicles III	Amy Apple, Frederica Lipps	
2011	Kamen Rider: Climax Heroes Fourze	Kamen Rider Femme	
2012	Kamen Rider: Super Climax Heroes	Kamen Rider Femme	
2014	Toukiden: Kiwami	Reki	
2015	Closers	Mistilteinn	
2016	Dynasty Warriors: Godseekers	Li Xia	
2017	Dead or Alive Xtreme Venus Vacation	Misaki	
2018	Girls' Frontline	PKP	
2018	Girls' Frontline	AEK-999	
2018	God Eater 3	Amy Chrysanthemum	
2019	Azur Lane	USS Vincennes	
2019	Azur Lane	USS Quincy	
2019	Azur Lane	SMS Seydlitz	
2019	Azur Lane	Misaki	
2021	A Certain Magical Index: Imaginary Fest	Junko Hokaze	
2021	Counter: Side	Sylvia Lena Cooper	
2021	Umamusume: Pretty Derby	Air Shakur	
2022	Triangle Strategy	Frederica	
2022	Xenoblade Chronicles 3	Mio	
2024	Echocalypse	Lyra	
2024	Fire Emblem Heroes	Baldr	
2025	Venus Vacation Prism: Dead or Alive Xtreme	Misaki	

=== Dubbing ===
==== Animated TV series ====
List of voice performances in foreign animated TV series
Year	Title	Role	Original performer	Ref.
2011	Jake and the Never Land Pirates	Cubby	Jonathan Morgan Heit (seasons 1–3), Jadon Sand (seasons 3–4)	
2019	Moominvalley	Snorkmaiden	Akiya Henry (English), Alina Tomnikov (Finnish)	

==== Live-action TV series ====
- Game of Thrones (2013), Sansa Stark – Originally performed by Sophie Turner

=== Audio dramas ===
- Citrus (2015), Mei Aihara
