= List of Kin-iro Mosaic episodes =

Kin-iro Mosaic is an anime television series produced by Studio Gokumi, based on the 4-panel manga series written and illustrated by Yui Hara and published in Houbunsha's Manga Time Kirara Max magazine. The story follows Shinobu Omiya and her friends as she is joined by her friend from England, Alice Cartelet. The first season aired in Japan on AT-X between July 6, 2013, and September 21, 2013. The respective opening and ending themes are "Jumping!!" and "Your Voice", both performed by Rhodanthe* (Asuka Nishi, Manami Tanaka, Risa Taneda, Nao Tōyama and Yumi Uchiyama). A second season, Hello!! Kin-iro Mosaic, aired between April 5, 2015, and June 21, 2015. The respective opening and ending themes are "Yumeiro Parade" (夢色パレード, Dream-colored Parade) and "My Best Friends", both performed by Rhodanthe*. Both series were simulcast by Crunchyroll and are licensed in North America by Sentai Filmworks under the title Kinmoza!. An original video animation episode, titled Kin-iro Mosaic: Pretty Days, aired in Japanese theaters on November 12, 2016, and was released on Blu-ray Disc and DVD on March 3, 2017.

== Episode list ==
=== Kin-iro Mosaic (2013) ===
No.	Title	Original release date
1	"...in Wonderland"; Transliteration: "Fushigi no Kuni no" (Japanese: ふしぎの国の)	July 6, 2013
A ten-year-old Japanese schoolgirl named Shinobu Omiya has a homestay visit in England, where she spends time living with a British girl named Alice Cartelet. Alice initially has trouble getting along with Shinobu due to the language barrier, but they soon get along swimmingly. As Shinobu's homestay comes to an end, Alice hopes that she will one day come to Japan. Five years later, Shinobu, who is now in high school, receives a letter from Alice, allegedly saying that she is coming to Japan. Surely enough, Alice appears at Shinobu's school, revealing she has transferred to her class and will be staying at her house.
2	"Even If I'm Small"; Transliteration: "Chitchakutatte" (Japanese: ちっちゃくたって)	July 13, 2013
Alice spends the day at school lamenting her short height whilst also developing a one-sided rivalry with their English teacher, Sakura Karasuma. Later, Alice goes on an outing with Shinobu and her friends Aya Komichi and Yoko Inokuma, before they try to figure out what to do for their future careers. Some awkwardness follows as Shinobu and the others assume Alice is homesick and try to help her out.
3	"What Kind of Friends Will I Make?"; Transliteration: "Donna Tomodachi Dekiru kana" (Japanese: どんなトモダチできるかな)	July 20, 2013
Whilst looking through an old photo album, Alice tells the others about her half-Japanese friend from England, Karen Kujo, who helped teach her Japanese. The next day, they actually come face to face with Karen herself, who had moved to Japan so she could study at Shinobu and Alice's school in the neighbouring class. As Karen gets along with the others, Alice feels a little jealous as Shinobu takes more interest in her. Whilst easily fitting into Shinobu's group, Karen has trouble making friends in her own class as they are intimidated by her foreign appearance. Asking the others for advice, Karen hears from the others about how Aya became friends with Shinobu and Yoko after transferring into middle school. Thanks to everyone's advice, Karen manages to speak clearly with her classmates and make lots of friends.
4	"Aya Nervous in the Rain"; Transliteration: "Ame Dokidoki Aya" (Japanese: あめどきどきあや)	July 27, 2013
Despite it being her birthday, Shinobu feels a little downhearted following a remark from her sister, Isami. Later, Alice gets irritated when people see her more as Karen's little sister as opposed to a big sister. Whilst initially having some jealousy when Shinobu shows favoritism toward's Karen's present for her, Alice comes to realise that she loves Shinobu and Karen equally. Later, as Shinobu is off sick with a cold, Aya becomes anxious when Yoko receives an alleged 'love letter' in her locker, though Yoko assures her she would've turned down any admirers anyway. The letter turns out to be a letter Shinobu wrote for Alice's parents that she wanted Alice to translate.
5	"Together With Onee-chan"; Transliteration: "Onee-chan to Issho" (Japanese: おねえちゃんといっしょ)	August 3, 2013
After Shinobu embarrasses herself a little, Yoko explains how she often had to look after Shinobu in elementary school during times she was apart from Isami. Later, everyone gathers at Shinobu's home for a study session, before heading to the park so Isami can take pictures of everyone. The next day, Yoko gets relied on a lot and ponders if she is just a tsukkomi character, whilst also pondering how she views Shinobu as something of a little sister.
6	"Golden Alice, Golden Karen"; Transliteration: "Kin no Arisu, Kin no Karen" (Japanese: 金のアリス, 金のカレン)	August 10, 2013
As summer vacation rolls in, the girls go on a trip to the mountains where they do some fishing and play about in the stream. Later, the girls attend a local summer festival, where they play at the stands. Whilst the others play with some fireworks, Yoko treats Aya's foot that had gotten sore from her sandals.
7	"Hungry Karen"; Transliteration: "Harapeko Karen" (Japanese: はらぺこカレン)	August 17, 2013
Alice has an exhausting P.E. lesson, not helped by her forgetting her tracksuit. Noticing Karen has gained weight since coming to Japan, the others suggest she go on a diet, only for Aya to get upset when she finds she weighs more than Karen. Later as tests come up, Shinobu gets Alice to help her study English and she manages to get an uncharacteristically good grade.
8	"What Day is Today?"; Transliteration: "Kyou wa Nanno Hi?" (Japanese: 今日はなんの日?)	August 24, 2013
As the school festival approaches, Shinobu's class decides to do a Japanese/Western maid café whilst Karen's class is putting on a play. On the day of the festival, Alice reminds Shinobu that it is also the anniversary of the day she came to England, but can't find the opportunity to give her a present for the occasion. After serving various guests, including Isami, Shinobu's group go to see Karen's class' unique take on Snow White. After the festival comes to an end, Alice eventually manages to give Shinobu her present, a ribbon, as thanks for the hairpin she received from her.
9	"Who Isn't Sleeping?"; Transliteration: "Nenai Ko Dare da" (Japanese: ねないこだれだ)	August 31, 2013
With her parents away for the night, Aya invites the other girls over for a sleepover, during which she ends up smacking away Yoko when she tries to touch her hair. Lacking the confidence to apologise to Yoko, Aya asks Karen to let her become her pupil so she can learn her energetic traits, but these don't suit her at all. After working up the courage to apologise, Yoko states she didn't think anything of the incident and buys some matching notebooks. Later, the girls play hide-and-seek in the school.
10	"The Wonderful Five"; Transliteration: "Suteki na Gonin-gumi" (Japanese: すてきな五にんぐみ)	September 7, 2013
Sakura grows concerned over Alice's jealously towards her over Shinobu. Later, as Alice gets hung up over horoscopes, the girls play some baseball and visit a bookstore. On the weekend, everyone gets up to their own thing, coincidentally meeting up along the way.
11	"Try and Guess How Much I Like You"; Transliteration: "Donna ni Kimi ga Suki daka Atete Goran" (Japanese: どんなにきみがすきだかあててごらん)	September 14, 2013
Shinobu invites everyone over for a Christmas party, with Alice happy to spend Christmas with Shinobu. After having a nightmare on New Year's Day, Alice comes to school speaking nothing but nonsensical English, worrying Shinobu. Alice eventually confesses that she was anxious about Shinobu losing interest in her because she was growing too accustomed to Japanese.
12	"Golden Moment"; Transliteration: "Kin'iro no Toki" (Japanese: きんいろのとき)	September 21, 2013
Upon the start of a new school year, both Alice and Aya become downhearted when they are put in separate classes from Shinobu and Yoko. However, Shinobu reassures her that the distance between them isn't any longer. After the credits, back to when the group were first year students, Karen starts to imitate a manga protagonist, prompting Shinobu to come up with her own story, in which she and Alice are princesses, Karen is a pirate, Aya is a mermaid and Yoko is a prince.

=== Hello!! Kin-iro Mosaic (2015) ===
No.	Title	Original release date
1	"Spring is Here"; Transliteration: "Haru ga Kita" (Japanese: はるがきたっ)	April 5, 2015
With their second year in full swing, both Shinobu and Aya are having trouble getting used to not being in the same class as Alice and Yoko, while Karen is intimidated by her classroom's strict homeroom teacher, Akari Kuzehashi. In reality, Akari wants to get along with her students but always seems to end up scaring them. Later, the girls try to learn more about Shinobu, later learning a little about how she got interested in foreign countries.
2	"Present For You"; Transliteration: "Purezento Fō Yū" (Japanese: プレゼント・フォー・ユー)	April 12, 2015
Akari continues to struggle with getting her students to like her. Meanwhile, the girls get together at Shino's house to make sweets for an afternoon tea party, though all manner of problems put them off their 'afternoon' schedule. Later, as Shinobu's class work on making some happis, Akari receives encouragement from the friendly Karen, managing to give off a sincere smile.
3	"You're So Bright"; Transliteration: "Anata ga Tottemo Mabushikute" (Japanese: あなたがとってもまぶしくて)	April 17, 2015
Yoko's younger siblings Kota and Mitsuki show up at school, inadvertently upsetting Yoko with a lie. Aya helps them be more honest and apologise, but has trouble putting her own advice into practise. Later, Alice starts to miss her pet dog back home, so the girls try to help her find a substitute.
4	"Rain or Shine"; Transliteration: "Ame nimo Makezu" (Japanese: 雨にもまけず)	April 24, 2015
Alice and Aya try their hand at being delinquents in order to appear more grown up, but this leads to Shinobu and Alice getting into a small fight, though they soon manage to make up. Later, Aya ends up trimming her bangs too short, becoming ashamed of her exposed forehead, while Alice worries about some flowers she planted a few months ago.
5	"Come Play with Your Big Sister"; Transliteration: "Onee-chan to Asobō" (Japanese: おねえちゃんとあそぼう)	May 3, 2015
Noticing that Isami appears to be more spaced out than usual, the girls invite her to hang out with them on a photo-snapping day out to try and cheer her up. While depressed for most of the day, Isami soon returns to her usual self after saving Shinobu from getting hurt. Later, Alice, inspired by the tale of the Straw Millionaire, goes on a trading quest, eventually receiving a valuable ring from Karen, which she ends up trading with Isami for the one thing she considers more valuable, Shinobu.
6	"The Girl on My Mind"; Transliteration: "Kininaru Ano Ko" (Japanese: きになるあの子)	May 10, 2015
The girls pay a visit to a restaurant, run by the family of Karen's classmate Honoka Matsubara, so that Yoko can attempt a giant parfait challenge. Later, after Shinobu and Honoka bond over their love of blonde hair, Honoka tries to work up the courage to ask Karen for her e-mail address. The next day, Akari reminisces about her high school days, when she first met an airheaded upperclassman that she eventually realises was Sakura.
7	"My Dear Hero"; Transliteration: "Mai Dia Hīrō" (Japanese: マイ・ディア・ヒーロー)	May 17, 2015
Karen gets into a fight with her father and runs away from home, deciding to spend the night at Shinobu's house while she calms down. The next day, after Alice helps her make up with her father, Karen tells the others about how Alice was like following Shinobu's homestay. One day, as Karen tried to find some way to catch the attention of Alice, who was too focused on learning Japanese, she ended up falling off a bridge and twisting her ankle. Just as she was losing hope, Karen noticed Alice, who had been searching for her all evening, and managed to use some Japanese she taught her to get her attention. Ever since, Karen has regarded Alice as her hero.
8	"Almost Summer Vacation"; Transliteration: "Mō Sugu Natsuyasumi" (Japanese: もうすぐ夏休み)	May 24, 2015
With summer vacation approaching, the girls make plans to go to the beach, but have to prepare for their final exams first. As the girls stop by a fast food restaurant, Shinobu suggests that Alice join Karen on her vacation to England to visit her parents. Later, after the students tidy up the classrooms for the end of term, Shinobu, Alice, and Aya go shopping for swimsuits together.
9	"A Special Day"; Transliteration: "Totteoki no Ichinichi" (Japanese: とっておきの一日)	May 31, 2015
As summer vacation begins, Aya goes over to Yoko's house to help get her homework sorted ahead of schedule, leading to various mishaps. Meanwhile, Shinobu goes to the salon to get her hair cut while Karen and Alice invite Honoka to hang out with them. Afterwards, Karen gives Honoka some motivation for her tennis match, which takes place while the others visit the beach.
10	"Seaside Promise"; Transliteration: "Umibe no Yakusoku" (Japanese: 海べのやくそく)	June 7, 2015
The girls arrive at the beach, where Sakura and Akira are also paying a visit. After a day of swimming, misunderstandings, and embarrassments, the girls check out an undersea park before making their way home.
11	"A Slightly Long Night"; Transliteration: "Hon'no Sukoshi no Nagai Yoru" (Japanese: ほんのすこしの長い夜)	June 14, 2015
Following the beach trip, Karen spends the day together with Honoka. Later, Shinobu starts feeling lonely after Alice and Karen go off on their trip to England, so Aya and Yoko spend the night together with her.
12	"Because I Love You More Than Anything"; Transliteration: "Naniyori Tobikiri Suki Dakara" (Japanese: なによりとびきり好きだから)	June 21, 2015
As Alice and Karen approach the end of their time in England, Alice and Shinobu get to have a long awaited phone conversation with each other. The pair soon arrive back in Japan with some souvenirs and video memories. When the new term begins, Shinobu discovers a talent she is good at but wants to focus more on her dream of becoming an interpreter, so the others give her their support.

=== Kin-iro Mosaic: Pretty Days (2017 OVA) ===
No.	Title	Original release date
OVA	"Kin-iro Mosaic: Pretty Days"; Transliteration: "Kin'iro Mozaiku Puriti Deizu" (Japanese: きんいろモザイク Pretty Days)	November 12, 2016 (theaters); March 3, 2017 (BD/DVD)
As Shinobu's class prepares to put on a play for the upcoming culture festival, Aya starts to feel distanced from Shinobu as she doesn't share any elementary school memories with her. While preparing outfits with everyone, Aya recalls her third year of middle school, when she, Shinobu, and Yoko were preparing for high school entrance exams. After being given of Moegi High School tour by Sakura, Shinobu became determined to go there despite her generally bad grades, receiving studying help from both Aya and Yoko. Despite already passing an exam for a more prominent high school, Aya ultimately decided to apply to Moegi alongside Shinobu and Yoko, with all three girls managing to pass. On the day of the festival, Aya ends up having to fill in as the princess in Shinobu's play, which gets out of hand when stage fright and ad-libbing get thrown into the mix. With Shinobu's impromptu writing and the support of their friends, however, the play becomes a huge success, leaving Aya thankful that she came to the same school as Shinobu.
