= List of YuruYuri episodes =

YuruYuri is a Japanese anime series based on the comedy manga series by Namori, which is published in Comic Yuri Hime. The series follows the everyday lives of Akari, Kyoko, Yui and Chinatsu who make up the Amusement Club at their school. The first series aired AT-X between July 5 and September 20, 2011, and was simulcast on Crunchyroll. A second season, titled YuruYuri♪♪, aired in Japan between July 2, 2012, and September 17, 2012, and was also simulcast by Crunchyroll. An original video animation by TYO Animations, YuruYuri Nachuyachumi!, was released on Blu-ray Disc and DVD on February 18, 2015. It was followed by two specials, titled YuruYuri Nachuyachumi!+, which aired in August and September 2015. A third season titled YuruYuri San☆Hai!, also by TYO Animations, aired between October 5, 2015, and December 21, 2015. A new OVA, titled YuruYuri, (pronounced "YuruYuri Ten"), was announced on April 22, 2018, to celebrate the manga's tenth anniversary. The OVA is animated by Lay-duce instead of TYO Animations, with Daigo Yamagishi as director, Takahiro as scriptwriter, and Kazutoshi Inoue serving as character designer and chief animation designer. The new OVA was crowdfunded and completed its goal in February 2019. It was released on November 13, 2019 and had its television premiere on AT-X on February 23, 2020.

The opening theme is "The Great YuriYurarararaYuruYuri Incident" (ゆりゆららららゆるゆり大事件, Yuriyurarararayuruyuri Daijiken) by Nanamori Middle School Amusement Club (Minami Tsuda, Rumi Ōkubo, Shiori Mikami and Yuka Ōtsubo), while the ending theme is "Let's Go at My Pace" (マイペースでいきましょう, Mai Pēsu de Ikimashō) by Nanamori Middle School Amusement Club. For the second season, the opening theme is "Yes! YuYuYu☆YuruYuri♪♪" (いぇす！ゆゆゆ☆ゆるゆり♪♪, Yesu! YuYuYu☆YuruYuri♪♪) by Nanamori Middle School Amusement Club while the ending theme is "100% Middle Schooler" (100%ちゅ～学生, Hyakku Pāsento Chu~ Gakusei) by Nanamori Middle School Amusement Club. The opening theme for episode six of the second season is "Yonde Mirakurun" (よんでミラクるん!) by Ayana Taketatsu while the ending theme for episode eight is "Girl's Power" (ガールズパワーで, Gāruzu Pawā de) by Tsuda and Ōkubo. The anime has been licensed in North America by NIS America. For the OVA, the opening and ending themes are "YuruYurinrinrinrinrin" (ゆるゆりんりんりんりんりん) and "After School Days" (アフタースクールデイズ, Afutā Sukūru Deizu), both performed by the Nanamori Middle School Amusement Club. For Nachuyachumi!+, the opening and ending themes are "YuriShuraShuShuShu" (ゆりしゅらしゅしゅしゅ) and "Naptime Universe" (おひるねゆにばーす, Ohirune Yunibāsu). For the third season, the main opening and ending themes are "Chochocho! YuruYuri Capriccio!!!" (ちょちょちょ!ゆるゆり☆かぷりっちょ!!!, Chochocho! YuruYuri Kapuriccho!!!) and "Atchu~ma Seishun!" (あっちゅ〜ま青春！) by the Nanamori Middle School Amusement Club. The ending theme for episode 12 is "The Shiny Story You Gave Me" (きみがくれたシャイニーストーリー, Kimi ga Kureta Shiny Story) by the Nanamori Middle School Amusement Club. For the 10th anniversary OVA, the opening and ending themes are "YuruYuri Tenya Wanya☆" (ゆるゆり、てんやわんや☆, YuruYuri Tenya Wanya☆) and "Ribitte Chime♪" (リピってチャイム♪, Ribitte Chime♪), both performed by the Nanamori Middle School Amusement Club.

A four-episode original net animation series produced by DMM.Futureworks and W-Toon Studio, titled MiniYuri, began streaming on Pony Canyon's YouTube channel from September 25, 2019. The series is directed by Seiya Miyajima, with Takahiro as scriptwriter, and Yasuhiro Misawa composing the music.

== Episode list ==
=== YuruYuri (2011) ===
| No. | Title | Written by | Original release date |
|---|---|---|---|
| 1 | "Middle School Debut!"; Transliteration: "Chūgaku Debyū!" (Japanese: 中学デビュー!) | Takashi Aoshima | July 5, 2011 |
As Akari Akaza enters middle school, she decides to join the Amusement Club alongside her friends, Kyōko Toshinō and Yui Funami. They are later joined by Akari's classmate, Chinatsu Yoshikawa, who originally intended to join the now-defunct tea ceremony club, but is convinced to join the Amusement Club. Noticing Akari's lack of presence, the girls try to come up with ways of improving her personality.
| 2 | "Me and You and the Student Council"; Transliteration: "Watashi to Anata to Seitokai" (Japanese: 私とあなたと生徒会) | Hideaki Koyasu | July 12, 2011 |
The student council vice president, Ayano Sugiura, shows her annoyance at always placing behind Kyōko in tests, while her assistant Chitose Ikeda fantasizes about the yuri potential between the two. Meanwhile, two classmates, Himawari Furutani and Sakurako Ōmuro, are at war with each other as they are both vying for vice-president position. Ayano later gets a cold so the others pay her a visit.
| 3 | "You Wanna Come Visit?!...Yeah, Let's Go!"; Transliteration: "Uchi Kuru!? … Iku Iku!" (Japanese: ウチくる!? …いくいくっ!) | Kenji Sugihara | July 19, 2011 |
With Yui now living alone in her own apartment, she invites the others over for lunch. After Akari and Chinatsu leave, Kyōko decides to spend the night, only to remember she hasn't finished her homework.
| 4 | "The Great Summer Harvest"; Transliteration: "Natsu no Dai-shūkaku-sai" (Japanese: 夏の大収穫祭) | Takamitsu Kouno | July 26, 2011 |
The girls write Tanabata wishes, with Kyōko becoming annoyed at how Chinatsu's wish is responded to by Yui. Ayano studies fiercely to reach the top of the final exams, only to become disappointed to find Kyōko hadn't studied due to the exams conflicting with a doujin deadline. Later, everyone heads to the beach, where Ayano's attempts to be more friendly with Kyōko prove to be near fatal for Chitose's imagination.
| 5 | "When Akari and the Cicadas Cry"; Transliteration: "Akari to ka Minminzemi to ka Naku Koro ni" (Japanese: あかりとかミンミンゼミとかなく頃に) | Takashi Aoshima | August 2, 2011 |
Ayano unwittingly gets dragged along by Kyōko, Yui and Chitose to a doujinshi convention in Tokyo to help Kyōko sell her doujin. Himawari and Sakurako work on their summer homework, where Sakurako talks about why she joined the student council. Meanwhile, Akari and Chinatsu have a confusing conversation about the latter's feelings towards Yui, which leads to Chinatsu practicing "kissing" on Akari against her will just as Yui and Kyōko walk in.
| 6 | "Art☆Arter☆Artist"; Transliteration: "Āto☆Ātā☆Āchisuto" (Japanese: あーと☆あーたー☆あーちすと) | Hideaki Koyasu | August 9, 2011 |
A visit by a first year student inspires Kyōko to draw a doujin about her and Yui, prompting Chinatsu to respond with her own story, presented in a fearsome art style. Later, everyone meets Yui's relative's child, Mari, prompting Chinatsu to dress up as her favorite anime heroine, Mirakurun, only to completely destroy her image.
| 7 | "Christmasery"; Transliteration: "Kuri Sumaseri" (Japanese: くり済ませり) | Kenji Sugihara | August 16, 2011 |
With Christmas coming up, Kyōko holds a lottery to arrange the girls into pretend couples for mock dates. Kyōko and Chinatsu go to the movies and the arcade, Akari and Chitose visit some cafés, and Himawari and Sakurako go to a restaurant, while Ayano and Yui just sit around talking about their friends. Later, the girls spend New Year's at home where they check their greeting cards from each other.
| 8 | "April's Fool"; Transliteration: "Eipuriru Fūru" (Japanese: エイプリルフール) | Takamitsu Kouno | August 23, 2011 |
On April's Fools Day, Chitose decides to play a lying game with Ayano, who later discovers that all of her supposed lies were actually true. Later, Kyōko tries to get the attention of Chitose, only to discover it to be her twin sister, Chizuru, who doesn't particularly take too kindly to Kyōko.
| 9 | "I'm Not Scared of This Summer"; Transliteration: "Kotoshi no Natsu wa Kowakunai" (Japanese: 今年の夏はこわくない) | Hideaki Koyasu | August 30, 2011 |
The girls try to find way to distract themselves from the summer heat. While visiting the student council room for some cooling comfort, they meet the silent student council president, Rise Matsumoto, who they initially mistake for a spirit. Meanwhile, the science teacher, Nana Nishigaki, decides to do her experiments in the student council room.
| 10 | "It's a School Trip, But What Are We Here to Learn, I Wonder?"; Transliteration: "Shūgaku Ryokō to Iu ga, Watashi-tachi wa Ittai Nani o Manabi Osameta no Darō" (Japanese: 修学旅行というが、私たちは一体何を学び修めたのだろう) | Kenji Sugihara | September 6, 2011 |
Kyōko and Yui, along with Ayano and Chitose, go on a school trip to Kyoto, where they explore Kiyomizu-dera, have a bath together, and engage in a pillow fight.
| 11 | "Our Amusement Club"; Transliteration: "Watashi-tachi no Goraku-bu" (Japanese: わたしたちのごらく部) | Takashi Aoshima | September 13, 2011 |
Akari, Kyōko and Yui reminisce their childhood days when they were fighting a certain pink-haired girl implied to be Chinatsu. Later, a bump on the head causes Kyōko to become uncharacteristically polite. The others soon begin to miss the old Kyōko, especially when Kyōko plans to disband the Amusement Club, so they decide to hit her on the head again to return her to normal.
| 12 | "Warm Slumber Party With Everyone"; Transliteration: "Min'na de Pokapoka Gas'shuku he" (Japanese: みんなでポカポカ合宿へ) | Takamitsu Kouno | September 20, 2011 |
Everyone decides to have a sleepover at the clubroom during the summer, where Kyōko arranges a contest between the Amusement Club and the student council. After everyone has some barrel baths (during which Akari's barrel comes loose and rolls downhill), Chitose goes on a kissing rampage as a result of eating chocolate.

=== YuruYuri♪♪ (2012) ===
| No. | Title | Written by | Original release date |
|---|---|---|---|
| 1 | "The Protagonist Returns"; Transliteration: "Kaette Kita Shujinkō" (Japanese: 帰って来た主人公) | Takashi Aoshima | July 2, 2012 |
As the girls travel to a hot spring inn, Akari dreams of being the popular and well admired main protagonist that she always desired to be. Once at the inn, the girls play some ping pong and discover something about Chinatsu's hair. After that, they relax in the baths before watching a Mirakurun movie.
| 2 | "YuruYuri Everyday"; Transliteration: "YuruYuri Naru Hibi Naru Nari" (Japanese: ゆるゆりなる日々なるなり) | Hideaki Koyasu | July 9, 2012 |
Yui has a tough time getting Kyōko to concentrate on her homework. Later, the gang tries to come up with nicknames for each other. Meanwhile, Sakurako attempts to catch a snake that is loose in the Student Council room. Later, the girls discuss how to prevent getting a cold, though Kyōko ends up getting a cold regardless.
| 3 | "Chocolate and Tears and Girls and Girls and Isobe Fries"; Transliteration: "Choko to Namida to Onna to Onna to Isobeage" (Japanese: チョコと涙と女と女と磯辺揚げ) | Kenji Sugihara | July 16, 2012 |
Akari, Chinatsu, Sakurako and Himawari try to think of ways to pass time in class. Later, Himawari agrees to help teach Chinatsu to knit a scarf, which leaves Sakurako feeling lonely without her. As Valentine's Day comes and the girls give each other chocolates, Himawari gives Sakurako some Valentine gifts.
| 4 | "Achoo"; Transliteration: "Hitchu" (Japanese: ひっちゅ) | Takamitsu Kouno | July 23, 2012 |
After Ayano becomes bothered by allergies during a high pollen season, the student council clean up their room, with Ayano having trouble keeping her special pudding away from Sakurako. Later, Nana ends up making various zany inventions when the student council just want their clock fixed. Meanwhile, the Amusement Club try to find ways to pass the time while waiting for the rain to pass.
| 5 | "Lazy Japanese Summer"; Transliteration: "Nippon no Natsu Yurume no Natsu" (Japanese: 日本の夏 ゆるめの夏) | Hideaki Koyasu | July 30, 2012 |
As Kyōko realizes she needs to buy new batteries for her air conditioner, she gets distracted and ends up visiting everyone's homes, only to end up buying the wrong batteries after all. As she decides to have everyone go to the pool instead, Akari misses her train and tries to pass the time til the next one comes. Later, Kyōko visits Yui while she has a cold while Sakurako and Himawari follow Akari around.
| 6 | "[Announcement] YuruYuri Sold Out"; Transliteration: "[Sokuhō] YuruYuri Kanbai" (Japanese: 【速報】ゆるゆり完売) | Takashi Aoshima | August 6, 2012 |
The girls come to Comuket to help Kyōko run her doujin table, which is showing off a fan-made anime of Majokko Mirakurun in which Mirakurun fights against Team Giga Giga after they steal all the balls in the world. After selling out their stock, the girls go around in cosplay, where Chinatsu once again ruins the image of Mirakurun for young children. After Comiket, Kyōko brings up a box of conversation topics, including some weird ones.
| 7 | "Sisterly Relations and Such"; Transliteration: "Shimai Jijō Are Kore Sore Dore" (Japanese: 姉妹事情あれこれそれどれ) | Takamitsu Kouno | August 13, 2012 |
Sakurako gets pushed around a bit by her sisters Nadeshiko and Hanako while Himawari's little sister Kaede is a bit too inquisitive. Meanwhile, Chizuru decides to clean up Chitose's room while she is out, but has to take extreme measures to stop picturing her and Ayano together and drooling all over the place. Later, Himawari worries that she's gained weight and comes to Sakurako for some exercise advice. Elsewhere, Chinatsu talks with her older sister, Tomoko, who has a crush on Akari's older sister, Akane, who, at that moment, is doing perverted things with Akari's belongings while she is away.
| 8 | "Chinatsu Unrivalled"; Transliteration: "Chinatsu Musō" (Japanese: ちなつ無双) | Kenji Sugihara | August 20, 2012 |
As Kyōko asks the others to help finish her doujin for a deadline, they are reluctant to let Chinatsu assist in anything artistic. Later around Christmas time, everyone goes to a karaoke place, where Chinatsu fails to get a duet with Yui. As a consolation, Yui takes Chinatsu to the movies, where Chinatsu's plan to cling onto Yui during a scary movie causes Yui even greater scares.
| 9 | "A Day Something May or May Not Happen"; Transliteration: "Nani ka Arisō de Nani mo Nasasō na Hi" (Japanese: 何かありそうで何もなさそうな日) | Takamitsu Kouno | August 27, 2012 |
As the first years try to study for their exams, Sakurako has a hard time keeping focused. Later, Chinatsu ends up inadvertently hiding from the others and can't find a good opportunity to reemerge. During a sleepover at Akari's house, Chinatsu has trouble sleeping after watching a scary movie. Later, each of the first years end up encountering one of their seniors, resulting in some curious conversations.
| 10 | "School Trip R"; Transliteration: "Shūgaku Ryokō Āru" (Japanese: 修学旅行R) | Kenji Sugihara | September 3, 2012 |
As the second years are going on a school trip to Kyoto which brings up all sorts of déjà vu, Sakurako decides to go on her own 'trip' with Himawari, only to wind up getting lost. Meanwhile, Akari tries to cheer up Chinatsu as she becomes depressed over missing Yui and winds up in another dangerous situation. Later, as Himawari visits Sakurako's house, Nadeshiko recalls how the two used to be much closer in their childhood.
| 11 | "The Akari Who Leapt Through Time"; Transliteration: "Toki o Kakeru Akari" (Japanese: 時をかけるあかり) | Masahiko Ohta | September 10, 2012 |
While clearing out the closet, the Amusement Club finds a time machine which accidentally sends Akari back to the day before she started middle school. Stuck in the past until she can figure out how to fix the time machine, Akari decides to try to rectify the mistakes her past self made so she'll have a bigger presence. She ends up being spotted by Akane, who remains supportive of her. After failing her attempts to rectify her embarrassing middle school debut, Akari goes to Nana to ask for help in fixing the time machine. As Akari spends the next week hiding out in Akane's room, Akane warns her that changing her past might replace her old memories. As Nana manages to fix the time machine, Akari spots one more opportunity to save the presence by delaying Ayano from interrupting her, but stops when she thinks about losing her old memories. As Akari returns to the present, she finds everyone has been worried about her since she had disappeared for a week. After an explosive finale, the whole thing is revealed to be a story Kyōko came up with after being inspired by a certain movie.
| 12 | "Farewell Protagonist, Until We Meet Again"; Transliteration: "Saraba Shujinkō, Mata Au Hi Made" (Japanese: さらば主人公、また会う日まで) | Takashi Aoshima | September 17, 2012 |
Kyōko brings a bunch of old toys to the clubroom for everyone to play with. Later, the school holds a culture festival in which the Amusement Club and School Council put on a bizarre production of Snow White, with Kyōko in the lead role.

=== YuruYuri Nachuyachumi! (2015 OVA + TV specials) ===
| No. | Title | Written by | Release date |
|---|---|---|---|
| OVA | "YuruYuri Summer Vacation!"; Transliteration: "YuruYuri Nachuyachumi!" (Japanese: ゆるゆり なちゅやちゅみ!) | Michiko Yokote | February 18, 2015 |
Upon finding some camping equipment in the clubroom, the Amusement Club decide to go camping together for summer vacation, with the student council deciding to tag along. After spending the day making curry, the girls form pairs to go on a test of courage before hitting a bathhouse together.
| +1 | "YuruYuri Summer Vacation!+ +1"; Transliteration: "YuruYuri Nachuyachumi! Purasu - Purasu Wan" (Japanese: ゆるゆり なちゅやちゅみ！+ +1) | Hiroyuki Hata | August 20, 2015 |
The girls get together for a water balloon fight, after which they inadvertently spark a ghost rumor. Later, the girls take turns taking pictures of each other before looking over pictures from their camping trip with the student council.
| +2 | "YuruYuri Summer Vacation!+ +2"; Transliteration: "YuruYuri Nachuyachumi! Purasu - Purasu Tsū" (Japanese: ゆるゆり なちゅやちゅみ！+ +2) | Makoto Fukami | September 17, 2015 |
The Amusement Club have a sleepover at Yui's house, where they end up playing video games. Meanwhile, the student council have a sleepover of their own, with Sakurako trying hard to show her appreciation towards Ayano for always helping her out. Later that night, the girls attempt to take a picture of Kyōko's sleeping face as revenge for the ones she took of everyone during the trip.

=== YuruYuri San☆Hai! (2015) ===
| No. | Title | Written by | Original release date |
|---|---|---|---|
| 1 | "It is The Beginning of Amusement"; Transliteration: "Sore wa, Sunawachi, Goraku no Hajimari" (Japanese: それは、すなわち、娯楽の始まり) | Makoto Fukami | October 5, 2015 |
The Amusement Club play the King Game, where Kyōko gives out ludicrous commands while Chinatsu hopes to become King in order to give Yui a command. However, her chances quickly dwindle when the student council join in the game. Later, the second years have cooking class, where Kyōko challenges the others to arm wrestling, only to lose to everyone. Meanwhile, Akari comes across Hanako on her way to Sakurako's house, becoming shocked that she appears to be more mature than she is.
| 2 | "Tremble in Fear"; Transliteration: "Saa, Obierugaii" (Japanese: さぁおびえるがいい) | Renji Takigawa; Makoto Fukami | October 12, 2015 |
Yui asks the other girls to help get rid of a spider in her apartment before they all make some pancakes together, while Himawari and Sakurako misunderstand what the other is worrying about. Later, Ayano tries on some cute clothes, which she soon discovers used to belong to Kyoko, who spends some time with her at the park. Meanwhile, Akane finds herself in a pinch when she leaves an Akari body pillow-cover on the laundry line, rushing to hide it before Akari gets back home.
| 3 | "No Self-Awareness"; Transliteration: "Jikaku nashi" (Japanese: 自覚なし) | Renji Takigawa; Hiroyuki Hata | October 19, 2015 |
The first years do paintings of each of other for art class, with Chinatsu doing a terrifying representation of Akari while Himawari and Sakurako end up doing drawings that make fun of the other. The next day, Sakurako tries impersonating Ayano to seem like a more refined woman, only to wind up stressing out the real thing. Later, Kyōko comes over to Chinatsu's house, where Tomoko ends up mistaking her for Yui.
| 4 | "The Night Will Connect Their Thoughts."; Transliteration: "Sono Yoru wa, Minna no Omoi o Tsunaideyuku." (Japanese: その夜は、みんなの思いを繋いでゆく。) | Hiroyuki Hata | October 26, 2015 |
Kyōko, Ayano, and Chitose have a sleepover at Yui's place, while Chinatsu, Sakurako, and Himawari spend the night at Akari's, where Tomoko is also spending the night with Akane. Sakurako and the others try to surprise Akari, while Tomoko gets some special attention from Akane. The next day, Sakurako comes up with a way to pass the boredom during PE, exposing her poor kanji writing skills.
| 5 | "The Girl Falls Into Darkness"; Transliteration: "Shōjo wa, Yami ni Ochiru" (Japanese: 少女は、闇に落ちる) | Makoto Fukami | November 2, 2015 |
Kyōko, Yui, Ayano, and Chitose help teach Himawari how to do back hip circles in time for a test the next day. Later, Ayano becomes distressed when she accidentally takes off Kyōko's signature ribbon without her knowing, but Chitose helps her to return it. The next day, Ayano and Chitose go shopping together, where they help pick out clothes for each other, while Yui and Kyōko meet Hanako and Nadeshiko while studying at a family restaurant.
| 6 | "The Invisible Face is There."; Transliteration: "Mienai Kao wa, Soko ni Aru." (Japanese: 見えない顔は、其処にある。) | Makoto Fukami | November 9, 2015 |
Kyōko does all sorts of things to try to get Yui's attention before everyone tries their hand at apple peeling. Later, the girls find themselves in the middle of a blackout, where they have to deal with more of Kyōko's antics.
| 7 | "It Will Be an Unforgettable Day"; Transliteration: "Wasurerarenai Ichinichi ni Naru" (Japanese: 忘れられない一日になる) | Yukio Kado | November 16, 2015 |
Ayano tries to work up the courage to invite Kyōko to the movies with her, only to wind up invited by her instead. Meanwhile, Chinatsu asks Akari to be her pretend girlfriend in preparation for a sleepover with Yui. The next day, Chinatsu tries her best to appeal to Yui during their sleepover together.
| 8 | "It Is the Piece of a Smile Everyone Acquires."; Transliteration: "Sore wa, Daremo ga Te ni suru Egao no Kakera." (Japanese: それは、誰もが手にする笑顔のカケラ。) | Hiroyuki Hata | November 23, 2015 |
Rise returns a dropped notebook to Akari, who gives her a cough drop in return, setting her on a Straw Millionaire-style series of exchanges as she helps out the other students. Later, Sakurako acts coldly towards Himawari after having a weird dream about her. Afterwards, Chizuru meets Kaede in the park, managing to show a side of herself she doesn't usually show her friends, while Kyōko goes to the arcade with Sakurako to help her win some pajamas for Hanako.
| 9 | "This is the Story of a Little Love and Courage"; Transliteration: "Sore wa, Chīsana Koi to, Sukoshi no Yūki no Monogatari." (Japanese: それは, 小さな恋と, 少しの勇気の物語。) | Hiroyuki Hata | November 30, 2015 |
Following her encounter with Kaede, Chizuru decides to try to better herself in order to become friends with her classmates Dezaki and Koyama. Later, Yui and Kyōko follow Mari as she goes on her first errand, where she is joined by Kaede, who is being followed by Sakurako and Himawari. Afterwards, Ayano has a sleepover with Chitose, hearing about how Chizuru was like as a kid.
| 10 | "With You, Forever"; Transliteration: "Kimi to Nara Itsudemo" (Japanese: 君とならいつでも) | Hiroyuki Hata | December 7, 2015 |
Akari helps Yui to shovel snow in Mari's yard before everyone uses what is left to try to build a snow hut. While keeping Kyōko warm from the cold, Akari recalls how they once played hide-and-seek with Yui. Later, after Kyōko becomes sick with a cold from working to finish Mari's snow hut, Yui is scouted by the track-and-field club, which Kyōko isn't pleased to hear about. She is soon relieved to hear that Yui had always planned to turn them down.
| 11 | "Terrible No Matter How Much You Struggle"; Transliteration: "Dō Agaitemo Dotsubo" (Japanese: どうあがいても土壺) | Makoto Fukami | December 14, 2015 |
Yui and Ayano awkwardly try to make conversation while waiting for Kyōko and Chitose, constantly misunderstanding each other's reactions to their puns. The next day, Chinatsu comes to school with a fever, which somehow improves her talents during class, while Ayano stumbles across Yui crying, believing her to be suffering through some trouble when she really just stubbed her toe while skipping. Later, the girls split into groups to prepare for a flower viewing party.
| 12 | "Cherry Blossoms in Full Bloom and a Romantic Storm"; Transliteration: "Mankai Sakura ni Roman no Arashi" (Japanese: 満開桜に浪漫の嵐) | Makoto Fukami | December 21, 2015 |
The girls enjoy their flower viewing party, putting on skits and playing games, before being treated to a wonderful view of the falling flowers. Later, the girls stay in the clubroom overnight to help Kyōko finish her doujin, where they collaborate on a drawing of a robot that struggles to stay robot-like. That night, Yui tells Akari about how she and Kyōko created the Amusement Club, waiting for Akari to join them.

=== MiniYuri (2019 ONA) ===
| No. | Title | Release date |
|---|---|---|
| 1 | "Beginner's Introduction to YuruYuri"; Transliteration: "Hajimete no YuruYuri Nyūmon" (Japanese: はじめてのゆるゆり入門) | September 25, 2019 |
Kyōko gives an inaccurate description of YuruYuri for new viewers.
| 2 | "YuriTuber"; Transliteration: "YuriChūbā" (Japanese: ゆりTuber) | October 2, 2019 |
The Amusement Club set up their own YuriTube channel and upload videos of them doing various activities.
| 3 | "YuruYurympics"; Transliteration: "YuruYurinpikku" (Japanese: ゆるゆりんぴっく) | October 9, 2019 |
In honor of the upcoming Olympic Games, Kyōko hosts her own sports tournament titled the YuruYurympics.
| 4 | "YuruYuri Murder Mystery"; Transliteration: "YuruYuri Satsujin Jiken" (Japanese: ゆるゆり殺人事件) | October 16, 2019 |
Kyōko and Chinatsu find Akari unconscious in the clubroom and try to figure out the mystery of what happened to her.

=== YuruYuri, (2019 OVA) ===
| No. | Title | Written by | Release date |
|---|---|---|---|
| OVA | "YuruYuri,"; Transliteration: "YuruYuri Ten" (Japanese: ゆるゆり、) | Takahiro | November 13, 2019 |
