= ID-0 =

2017 Japanese anime television series

- Poster for ID-0

アイディー・ゼロ (Aidī Zero)
- Genre: Science fiction Mecha
- Anime television series
- Directed by: Gorō Taniguchi
- Produced by: Yōichi Sekine; Toshikazu Sugimoto; Hirofumi Nishikōji
- Written by: Yōsuke Kuroda
- Music by: Takayuki Hattori
- Studio: Sanzigen
- Licensed by: Netflix (streaming rights)
- Original network: Tokyo MX, Sun TV, KBS, BS 11
- Original run: April 9, 2017 – June 25, 2017
- Episodes: 12

ID-0 (Japanese: アイディー・ゼロ, Hepburn: Aidī Zero) is a 2017 cyberpunk Japanese anime television series produced by Sanzigen. The anime was announced through a teaser video on August 7, 2016. followed by the official website on January 26, 2017. The series is produced by Sanzigen and directed by Goro Taniguchi, and aired from April 9, 2017, to June 25, 2017. The series is set when humanity has developed I-Machines, robots that can operate in extreme environments in space, in which the human pilot's consciousness can be transferred into the robot's operating system. An astrogeology student named Maya Mikuri joins the Excavate Company, a crew who illegally mine for the new mineral Orichalt, which is used for interstellar travel. However, Maya soon learns about a crew member with no identity named Ido, and his connection to a little girl named Alice found inside an Orichalt deposit within the core of the wandering planet known as Rajeev.

== Plot ==
In the distant future, the discovery of the new mineral Orichalt (オリハルト, Oriharuto) has allowed humanity to expand beyond the Sol System. On the constant lookout for Orichalt, humanity has developed I-Machines (Iマシン, I mashin), giant robots that can operate in extreme environments. I-Machines function by using Orichalt to transfer the human pilot's consciousness into the robot's operating system; in that sense, the human becomes the machine. While Alliance Academy student Maya Mikuri is in the middle of operating an I-Machine, she gets involved in an incident with mining pirates, and ends up serving as a crew member on their mining spaceship. Soon after, she and the rest of the crew begin to discover that the government has been hiding secrets about destructive forces concerning Orichalt. Worse, these same forces are on the verge of destroying human civilization, and the crew might be the only ones who can stop them.

== Characters ==
=== Excavate Company ===
The Excavate Company (エスカベイト社, Esukabeito-Sha) is a band of Orichalt miners who often act illegally, being compared to space pirates. Their base of operations is the mining ship Stulti (ストゥルティー号, Sutourutī-gō) (Latin for "foolish"), which is built to accommodate I-Machines and is equipped with four large manipulator arms featuring various tools. The ship is capable of utilizing Orichalt chunks to achieve faster than light warp-based travel through a process known as Miguel Jumping (probably referencing the Alcubierre Drive proposed by Mexican Physicist Miguel Alcubierre). Aside from Maya Mikuri and Clair Hojo, Stulti's entire crew consists of Evertrancers (エバートランサー, Ebātoransā), people whose consciousness permanently resides within an I-Machine, having lost or discarded their flesh-and-blood bodies in the past. Existing as an Evertrancer, willingly or otherwise, is noted to be illegal and highly unethical within galactic society.

Maya Mikuri (ミクリ・マヤ, Mikuri Maya)
Voiced by: Minami Tsuda (Japanese); Cherami Leigh (English)
A student at the Planet Alliance Academy with a knack for astrogeology. After an accident, she finds herself working with the members of Excavate. Keen and sharp-witted, but also a little timid and willing to let events unfold around her. Having been framed for illegally sharing information about a large Orichalt deposit, she is forced to sign on with Excavate until she is able to clear her name. Her personal I-Machine is a generic civilian model, painted yellow, with no special features or weaponry. After the Rajeev incident is resolved, the charges against Maya are dropped and she returns to the Academy, occasionally helping Excavate with jobs.
Ido (イド, Ido)
Voiced by: Kazuyuki Okitsu (Japanese); Todd Haberkorn (English)
A stoic and serious individual with a bold and reckless streak. His blue custom I-Machine body is armed with exploding throwing knives and is modeled after a ninja. His virtual avatar is identical to his I-Machine body. It is noted that Ido has no official records, from machine number to consciousness map, meaning he legally does not exist. Ido also suffers from amnesia, with no recollection of his true identity before becoming an Evertrancer. His first concrete memory is as a prisoner on an "exile ship", where highly dangerous criminals are imprisoned in immobile and unconscious I-Machine bodies. He inexplicably awakened with no memory or identity data and was alone with his mind for several years, only escaping when he suddenly Mind Tranced into his current body, which drifted in a capsule near the ship. Ido figures he was a prisoner for at least 20 years and has inhabited his current I-Machine body for seven years. Having no memories before awakening on the prison ship and thus no leads, he had since given up on trying to discover who he really is until Alice arrives. He initially experiences intense feelings of fear and guilt as well as fragments of memories whenever he is in Alice's presence for reasons he is unable to explain until he recalls a memory and recognizes her. From then on, he becomes highly protective of her, as she is the only known link to his past. Searching for Kain Arisugawa to demand answers, Ido encounters Addams, who reveals Ido is in fact Kain Arisugawa himself, stripped of his memories as part of Addams' plans to take his place using a clone body. Addams soon forces Ido into the clone body and returns his memories. Despite having his true identity and past returned to him, Ido rejects the name Kain Arisugawa and insists that he is now "Excavator Ido." While inhabiting the Kain clone body, Ido is shot by Addams. He reaches a Mind Trance pod and returns to his I-Machine body just as the clone dies, regarding the I-Machine as his "true" self and vowing that as Ido, he would stop Addams. Grayman gave him the name Ido from the designation "ID-0," referring to his lack of identity and memories.
Rick Ayer (リック・エイヤー, Rikku Eiyā)
Voiced by: Masaya Matsukaze (Japanese); Douglas Cavum (English)
A boisterous hotshot and womanizer, Rick was once a professional asteroid racing champion nicknamed the "Speed Star" before being paralyzed in an accident. Befitting his past and personality, his I-Machine body is a custom red model designed for speed and able to assume a jet-like configuration. He eventually reveals to Amanza that his consciousness is a virtual copy of the real Rick Ayer, who was declared brain dead and whose body was disposed of after the accident. He exists because of a backup system installed in asteroid racing vehicles, which allows a racer to calculate and react twice as fast as normal, essentially acting as their own copilot. Because he considers himself little more than a copy and struggles with wondering if he is even truly alive, Rick appears as his I-Machine body in a virtual space. In the aftermath of the Rajeev incident, it is implied that Rick begins a relationship with Amanza.
Karla Milla-Foden (Kāra Mira Fōden)
Voiced by: Sayaka Ōhara (Japanese); Cristina Vee (English)
The group liaison and information broker, Karla inhabits a purple and white custom I-Machine modeled after the female form, featuring molded breasts and powerful scanning and data-gathering systems. Her avatar in a virtual space is that of her former human body, a mature blonde woman. Before joining Excavate, Karla was once a talented but arrogant fund manager in the space resources market and has been an Evertrancer for ten years. Two years prior to joining Excavate, Karla lost her human body in a partial warp event, where it is suddenly Miguel Jumped to an unknown location. Her body somehow ends up in Addams' possession in suspended animation, where he uses it as a bargaining chip to bring Ido and Alice to him. Addams returns her to her human body as promised, but she Mind Trances into her I-Machine one last time to protect Maya and Alice from Addams, where it is soon destroyed. In the final assault against the Rajeev, Karla uses a pink-hued civilian I-Machine, but it is quickly destroyed, returning her to her human body. After the Rajeev incident, Karla becomes the CEO of MT Industries and uses her wealth to help society.
Grayman (グレイマン, Gureiman)
Voiced by: Rikiya Koyama (Japanese); Keith Silverstein (English)
The boss of Excavate and Stulti's captain, Grayman's I-Machine is a custom green and gray model with four extra sub-arms hidden in the shoulder armor. His avatar in a virtual space resembles his former human body, a tanned, well-built man. Grayman is a former United Planets Force captain who lost 740 crew members and a state of the art ship in an unknown incident. His real name is Jake Hojo (ジェイク・ホウジョウ, Jeiku Hōjō). He gave himself the name "Grayman" because he considers "Jake Hojo" to be dead.
Clair Hojo (クレア・ホウジョウ, Kurea Hōjō)
Voiced by: Hisako Kanemoto (Japanese); Christine Marie Cabanos (English)
Part of the Excavate company and Grayman's daughter, she serves as an operator. She is the only crew member to have a human body and does not seem to have a personal I-Machine.
Fa-Loser (ファルザ, Faruza)
Voiced by: Ari Ozawa (Japanese); Cristina Vee (English)
A member of an endangered species of small quadrupeds from an unknown planet in the Cetus Constellation, Fa-Loser inhabits a pink, rabbit-like I-Machine and behaves much like a dog. Before becoming an Evertrancer, it was used as an experimental animal by Kain Arisugawa. Its virtual avatar resembles its I-Machine body. Fa-Loser dislikes Rick for undisclosed reasons, but they seem to have reconciled in the wake of the Rajeev incident.

=== United Planets Force ===
Amanza Volchkova (アマンザ・ボルチコワ, Amanza Boruchikowa)
Voiced by: Junko Minagawa (Japanese); Anne Yatco (English)
A lieutenant in the United Planets Force Army stationed on the battleship Marito (マリトー, Maritō) and assigned to the "83rd Reconnaissance-in-Force Company" with the call sign "Recon Zero One," Amanza participates in a shakedown intending to detain Excavate after they recover a peculiar Orichalt deposit. During Stulti's escape via a "Miguel Out" while in the Miguel Line, her I-Machine is caught in the area of effect and is separated from Marito. Maya manages to recover the pod containing her human body, which is also taken along in the jump, and brings it on board Stulti. Amanza reluctantly decides to cooperate with Excavate after a brief period of distrust, drawn to the many mysteries that surround them. According to Sam Taylor of the organization Observer, Amanza is wanted for desertion by the United Planets Force military because of the circumstances that led to her allying with Excavate. Amanza's personal I-Machine is a variant of a standard military model, colored purple and armed with a beam rifle. This body is destroyed during the final push to the Rajeev core, but is replaced by an identical model some time afterward. Amanza leaves the Army and remains with Excavate after the Rajeev incident, mostly because of her newfound relationship with Rick.
Cecilia Ginney (チェチリア・ギニー, Chechiria Ginī)
Voiced by: Masako Katsuki (Japanese); Cindy Robinson (English)
An admiral in the United Planets Force Army who leads the assault on the Rajeev.
Anai (アナイ, Anai)
Voiced by: Akeno Watanabe (Japanese); Johanna Luis (English)

=== Planet Alliance Academy ===
Attomy Kinsberg (アットミー・キンズバーグ, Attomī Kinzubāgu)
Voiced by: Katsuhisa Hōki (Japanese); Jason Palmer (credited as Michael Chapman) (English)
A professor of astrogeology and Maya Mikuri's former instructor. He betrays Maya and leaves her for dead when an excavation mission goes wrong and Excavate Company arrives, later framing her for illegally sharing information about the dig site.
Romanov (ロマノフ, Romanofu)
Voiced by: Wataru Hatano (Japanese); Tony Azzolino (English)
Kinsberg's assistant, Romanov assists Kinsberg's plans when they abandon Maya and frame her.

=== Others ===
Kain Arisugawa (ケイン・アリスガワ, Kein Arisugawa)
Voiced by: Hikaru Midorikawa (Japanese); Kyle McCarley (English)
The creator of the Mind Trance system that allows for the use of I-Machines. It is later revealed that Addams Forte Chevalier took on Kain Arisugawa's identity several years ago and that Ido is the true Kain Arisugawa. Kain was an arrogant and egotistical man obsessed with gathering data, willing to intentionally sacrifice 90% of humanity for the sake of researching and controlling Orichalt and the wandering planets known as Rajeev, which are ancient alien constructs that hunt down Orichalt. He secretly uses Alice, the terminally ill daughter of colleague Jennifer Record, as a test subject in order to create an "Orillian" as part of this plan. Kain's utter lack of regard for human life and the revelation that Alice's fate was intentional causes his longtime friend Addams to snap and force him into an intentionally flawed Mind Trance, stripping his memories and imprisoning him in an immobile I-Machine body. However, Kain had a contingency plan in place to deliver a specially designed I-Machine that completely lacked identification data specifically to recover his consciousness with the designation "ID-0." As Ido many years later, he encounters Addams again, who returns his memories, though Ido rejects his past life as Kain Arisugawa. Through Kain's memories, Ido realizes that the Rajeev adapt and evolve, making it impossible to permanently defeat them and that the true solution is mutual understanding.
Addams Forte Chevalier (アダムス・フォルテ・シュヴァリエ, Adamusu Forute Shuvarie)
Voiced by: Takehito Koyasu (Japanese); Christopher Corey Smith (English)
A man with albinism wearing a golden mask who is often seen observing the events surrounding Excavate and the wandering planet Rajeev. His body is actually the third clone of Kain Arisugawa's body, which he refers to as "Triwaker," and he has taken Kain's identity for his own, occasionally transferring his mind to clones of Kain to remain young. He possesses a custom white and gold I-Machine modeled after a knight, featuring an energy cape and human-like face and armed with a scepter-like weapon. Addams' mask is a state-of-the-art portable Mind Trance device, which allows him to Mind Trance without needing to use a standard pod. Addams was once Kain Arisugawa's closest friend and colleague, but the incident that led to Alice becoming an Orillian drove him to madness. He intends to use Alice to stop or control the Rajeev and force Kain, now Ido, to atone for his sins. He enacts his plan by creating multiple artificial Orillian clones of himself and using them as warheads, injecting his consciousness like a virus into the Rajeev, not realizing they are capable of adapting. Addams also possesses his original body, which he transfers to after being defeated in battle with Ido. He also possesses another portable MT System device in the shape of a pistol which is aimed at the head and fired, killing his human body at the moment of transfer. In a last-ditch effort to control the amassed Rajeev, Addams Mind Trances with the Orichalt core, reuniting with both Alice and Jennifer. He has one last conversation with Ido before fully merging with the Rajeev consciousness, acknowledging that Kain Arisugawa is truly gone and addressing Ido by name for the first time, thanking him for everything.
Alice (アリス, Arisu)
Voiced by: Reina Ueda (Japanese); Cassandra Lee Morris (English)
A young girl who suddenly appeared out of a peculiar Orichalt deposit brought on board Stulti. She appears as a human girl around four years of age wearing catgirl accessories and possessing a playful, curious demeanor. Alice also loves playing the ball. She is, however, apparently incapable of speech and her body chemistry is noted to contain more silicon than a normal human's. Ido initially experiences intense feelings of fear and guilt as well as flashes of fragmented memories whenever in her presence. After saving her from being spaced and captured by a Rajeev within an Orichalt cloud, Ido recalls a memory and identifies her as Alice, a young girl he apparently knew in the past. She is constantly surrounded by a self-repairing crystalline film of Orichalt, enclosing her body in an airtight layer that allows her to survive in a vacuum. She possesses the ability to control this film, able to extend it to partially cover another person. It is later revealed that Alice is a being known as an "Orillian," a human form shaped from Orichalt and inhabited by a human consciousness. Alice is the daughter of Jennifer Record, a colleague of Kain Arisugawa and Addams Forte Chevalier. As a human, she was afflicted with a terminal illness which made her physically weak. Kain developed a plan to permanently transfer her mind to an I-Machine to allow her to survive, but intentionally botched the Mind Trance process to fuse her consciousness with Orichalt, intending to use the resulting being to control the Rajeev. The new being Miguel Jumped to an unknown location, remaining undiscovered until Excavate recovers her years later. Alice's fragmented consciousness is eventually reunited within the Rajeev core, restoring her full personality and reuniting her with her mother.
Urakuo Hakubi (白眉 有楽翁, Hakubi Urakuō)
Voiced by: Mugihito (Japanese); Lucien Dodge (English)
An old man who frequently converses with Addams about various events. He believes the Rajeev wandering planets and Alice's appearance are because of Amatsu-Mikaboshi, the Shinto god of chaos. He is revealed to be part of a society of elites who achieve virtual immortality by transferring to young clone bodies just before death with the side-effect of losing a percentage of memories with each transfer. His organization wished to achieve true immortality by becoming Orillians. He is killed in an explosion just after transferring to a new body.
Sam Taylor (サム・テイラー, Samu Teirā)
Voiced by: Isshin Chiba (Japanese); Bryce Papenbrook (English)
A member of the group Observer (オブザーバー, Obuzābā), tasked with ensuring various space-faring organizations adhere to galactic treaties. He approaches Excavate promising to get them pardoned for all of their various crimes and clear Maya's name. This, however, is only a front to distract the crew long enough to attempt to kidnap Alice, intending to experiment on her. He possesses the strange ability to read someone's mind simply by making eye contact with them, even if they are operating an I-Machine. Through this ability, he is able to identify Ido as an "enemy of humanity" and seems to recognize him. He is killed by Rajeev fragments before Ido is able to get more information out of him. The crew of Excavate later determine that because of the physical similarities, Sam Taylor is potentially a clone of Kain Arisugawa, the creator of the Mind Trance system, a fact Addams later confirms.
Jennifer Record (ジェニファー・レコード, Jenifā Rekōdo)
Voiced by: Kikuko Inoue (Japanese); Reba Buhr (English)
Alice's mother and a former colleague of Kain Arisugawa and Addams Forte Chevalier. Alice's apparent death and disappearance during a Mind Trance experiment mentally and emotionally breaks her. Kain hints that Addams had some romantic attraction to Jennifer after Alice's disappearance, though Addams later reveals to Ido that Jennifer was attracted to Kain. Consumed by anguish, Jennifer Mind Trances in the same manner as Alice, merging her consciousness with Orichalt in order to search for her daughter within the Rajeev's collective consciousness. To this end, she connects with Alice's body, using it at a catalyst to restore her daughter's fragmented consciousness and joining together with her and Addams within the Rajeev.
Zephyr (ゼファ, Zefa)
Voiced by: Taishi Murata
An information broker who Karla often contacts for information regarding Orichalt locations.
Kicho (奇蝶, Kichō)
Voiced by: Mami Koyama
An acquaintance of Urakuo Hakubi who briefly speaks with him after he transfers to a young clone body. She is killed in an explosion shortly after they converse.

== Episode list ==
No.	Title	Original release date
1	"Mind Trance"; Transliteration: "Konpaku Seni" (Japanese: 魂魄遷移)	April 9, 2017
Maya Mikuri, a young astrogeology student, studies under Professor Attomy Kinsberg and Romanov of the Planet Alliance Academy, as they mine for Orichalt ore on a remote asteroid. The three enter the Mind Trance (MT) System Units, which transfer their consciousness into I-Machines and allow them to operate in space without life support. While at the mining site, an explosion occurs, and Maya's I-Machine is blasted into space. Kinsberg and Romanov escape the blast and leave the asteroid. They desert Maya's I-Machine, but take her body in the MT System Unit with them. Her I-Machine is rescued by the Excavate Company, Orichalt pirating miners led by Grayman. The Excavate Company extract the ore and take Maya's I-Machine with them in their mining ship, the Stulti. Using her astrogeology knowledge, Maya helps the Excavate Company retrieve ore from another asteroid, which is being illegally mined by the Fujima Group. Suddenly, a fleet known as the Seventh Squadron of the Planet Alliance arrives to apprehend the Fujima Group. The Excavate Company retreat, but they later retrieve Maya's MT System Unit and return her consciousness to her body.
2	"Formless Minerals"; Transliteration: "Jikū Kessetsu" (Japanese: 時空結節)	April 16, 2017
Addams Forte Chevalier remembers when creator Kain Arisugawa explained the Mind Trance System, enabling humans to transfer their consciousness into I-Machines and work in dangerous or inhospitable conditions for a huge reduction in risk and cost. Aboard the Stulti, Clair Hojo researches that Kinsberg has shifted blame on Maya for illegally divulging information to the Fujima Group. Maya agrees to become part of the Excavate Company until she can repay them for rescuing her. Information broker Zephyr contacts Karla Milla-Foden, concerning a large Orichalt deposit on a new planet. Karla shares this data received from Planet Works, who wants to engage the Excavate Company as subcontractors. The operation is risky due to a surrounding Miguel Storm and a dense asteroid belt. Using I-Machines, Maya and Ido land on the planet, but they are caught in a Miguel Storm burst. After Ido is injured, Maya learns that Ido is an Evertrancer, an I-Machine without a human body. Maya downloads her memory archives into Ido, so that they can operate in a joined mode. As Maya guides Ido to the deposit, he successfully extracts the core. Upon returning to the Stulti, it is revealed that a young girl is inside the Orichalt.
3	"Miguel Line"; Transliteration: "Kūbaku Kairō" (Japanese: 空漠回廊)	April 23, 2017
The Excavate Company try to understand the phenomenon of the young girl, later recognized as Alice, existing inside the Orichalt. Meanwhile, a military battleship called the Marito appears looking for the Orichalt. The United Planets Force led by Lieutenant Amanza Volchkova seize the Stulti and the Excavate Company, discovering that most of the crew are composed of Evertrancers. The United Planets Force then confiscate the Orichalt and capture Alice. However, before the Excavate Company can be taken into custody, a meteor shower hits the Marito. During the confusion, the Excavate Company lay charges for a series of explosions to free the Stulti. When Maya distracts their captors, the crew manage to make a Miguel Jump and escape the Marito. This action confirms Maya's status as a full-fledged fugitive. During the Miguel Jump, Amanza's I-Machine is caught within the area of effect and is transported along with the Stulti. Maya manages to recover the MT System Unit containing Amanza's human body, which was taken along in the Miguel Jump with fragments of the Marito, and brings it aboard the Stulti.
4	"Singular Tactics"; Transliteration: "Teni Kishū" (Japanese: 転移奇襲)	April 30, 2017
Addams reviews the recent information about the Excavate Company and their escape from the Marito. Aboard the Stulti, the Excavate Company interrogate Amanza using their avatars and discuss the sudden appearance of the meteor shower that hit the Marito. During the discussion, she manages to escape, capturing Maya and Alice. After a gravitational wave soon appears, one of the two satellite moons from the planet materializes and sends a meteor shower toward the Stulti. The Excavate Company head out to intercept the meteor shower before it hits the Stulti. Amanza agrees to free Maya, and they activate their I-Machines to assist in the defense. Ido risks his life to explode one of the larger meteoroids to create a collision chain. He tells Amanza that he does not know his name and has no memory of the past, impressing Amanza with his selflessness. She suspects that his previous existence may have been erased on purpose.
5	"Ore with Free Will"; Transliteration: "Kesshō Yōjo" (Japanese: 結晶幼女)	May 7, 2017
The Stulti warps back into normal space, but the threatening moon appears to be following the Excavate Company. They think that it may be linked to Alice, to whom they have given the code name "Ore". Maya suggests that someone's memories are also contained within the Orichalt that they retrieved from the planet. Amanza questions Ido about his past, but he only knows of being an escaped criminal from an exile ship, where he had been held for about twenty years. The Excavate Company then encounter a red molecular cloud which seems harmless, but it displays characteristics of the same moon as the Stulti passes through. Some of the sand particles penetrate the ship and approaches Alice. As Maya and Amanza grab Alice and head for an escape shuttle, the sand particles pursue them, changing from a gaseous to a solid state and eventually dragging Alice out into space. However, Alice is able to survive in space, and Ido saves her. As his I-Machine holds her, memories containing images of Alice and sounds of his voice flood his consciousness, suggesting that there was some connection between them in the past.
6	"The Observer"; Transliteration: "Sekai Kakuran" (Japanese: 世界攪乱)	May 14, 2017
Ido fights a losing battle against the barrage of meteoroids until he is assisted by the crew, who are also overwhelmed. With minutes left before the Stulti can Miguel Jump, some military-type I-Machines appear and fire towards the ship, but their TTS warp weapons clear a path through the meteoroids. The Stulti performs a Miguel Jump to coordinates provided by the I-Machines and meet an Observer ship there. Observer supervisor Sam Taylor boards the Stulti, investigating the motive of a fleet battleship trying to seize both the Stulti and the Orichalt as well as the suspicious behavior of the satellite moon connected with the planet. The Excavate Company and Maya are cleared of any wrongdoing, as Taylor wants to figure out who within the United Planets Force initiated the action. While the crew debate their options, Taylor kidnaps Alice and tries to escape, but is stopped first by Amanza, then Maya and finally Ido. The meteoroids appear to attack the Observer I-Machines, and Taylor is caught in an explosion. His final message is that he recognized Ido, and that Ido must be exterminated as an "enemy of humanity". Maya, Ido and Alice become trapped within a large mass of meteoroids.
7	"Overstepping"; Transliteration: "Seizon Chūiki" (Japanese: 生存宙域)	May 21, 2017
The time is shown when Ido joined the Excavate Company three years ago. In the present, the remaining crew members try to rescue Maya, Ido and Alice, but the large mass that encases them warps out, taking Rick Ayer and Amanza as well. Ido and Maya investigate a wrecked probe plane inside, while Rick and Amanza fail to attach a drilling rig outside. Ido plays an audio recording that Maya found, indicating that earlier humanity already knew about Orichalt and its necessity for space travel as well as the existence of wandering planets. This explains the now restricted zone of the Miguel Net for interplanetary travel. Ido believes that this is why the United Planets Force and the Observers were so interested in them. Meanwhile, Rick and Amanza try to blast a hole into the large mass without success. At the last minute, just when Maya's life support shuts down, the Stulti arrive to retrieve them all. Back aboard the Stulti, they send the Orichalt packed with explosives towards the large mass in an attempt to destroy it. Ido speculates that a "Doctor Arisugawa" mentioned in the audio recording may be a clue to the mystery.
8	"Cracking the Flair"; Transliteration: "Kaden funryū" (Japanese: 荷電噴流)	May 28, 2017
Addams discusses information with Urakuo Hakubi about Alice and her connection to Orichalt. The Excavate Company review the audio recording from the wrecked probe plane, which suggests that the wandering planets are Orichalt collection devices constructed by an unknown civilization, possibly a secret kept by the United Planets Force. Ido proposes that the Excavate Company should find out more about the relationship between Orichalt and the wandering planet Rajeev as well as the true identity of Alice. They carefully take two months to return to the Miguel Net, minimizing usage of Orichalt to avoid pursuit by Rajeev. Later on, Amanza approaches a United Planets Force battleship, pretending that she escaped from the Excavate Company. She takes Rick as a prisoner so Karla can access information about Arisugawa in the United Planets Force data system. However, Addams detects the intrusion and only allows Karla to retrieve selective data that he authorizes, promising to give her back her human body. Meanwhile, remnants of Rajeev appear at colonized planet Fifth, populated with over 100 billion people, and proceed to consume it.
9	"Seeking the Truth"; Transliteration: "Shinsei Tankyū" (Japanese: 真誠探求)	June 4, 2017
Ten years earlier, Karla supervised assessment of an Orichalt sample held in a research facility. In the present, Addams tries to contain a report about the destruction of Fifth, discussing with Urakuo about the possible link between Rajeev and "The God of Chaos". The Excavate Company, believing that Taylor may be a clone of Arisugawa because of their physical similarities, prepare to travel to colonized planet Sixth in order to talk to Arisugawa. Amanza discovers that not only Rick's home planet is Sixth, but also that he is a copy created from backup data. The crew arrive at an MT Industries facility to get Arisagawa. When Ido and Karla enter the facility with Maya and Alice, Karla sides with the security forces instead, honoring her agreement with Addams. However, Ido disables the security I-Machines and confronts Addams, who has Karla's secured human body. Addams touches his MT mask to transfer his consciousness to an I-Machine, then asserts that Ido is the original Kain Arisugawa.
10	"Compressed Sin"; Transliteration: "Shukutai Rireki" (Japanese: 縮退履歴)	June 11, 2017
Addams reveals that his human body is "Triwaker", the third of the Arisugawa clones, and he attacks Ido with his I-Machine. Karla intercedes, demanding that he should return her human body as per their agreement. Although Addams obliges, her human body is weak after being inactive for ten years, and she has trouble standing. Addams forces Ido's consciousness back into Triwaker, and then shows a vision of the past when Kain transferred the consciousness of a dying Alice to save her. However, as part of Kain's original plan, Alice became embedded in the Orichalt, becoming an "Orillian". At the time, Addams was so horrified that he forced Kain's mind into an I-Machine, which was then exiled. Because the process was rushed, Kain lost all of his memory data. Back in the present, Addams attacks Ido again to exact his vengeance for Kain's actions in the past, but Ido destroys Addams's I-Machine. As Maya, Ido and Karla are reunited in their human bodies, Addams returns, shoots Ido in the back and escapes with Alice. Maya pursues them, but Addams forces Alice to initiate a Miguel Jump.
11	"Innocent Orbit"; Transliteration: "Muku Kidō" (Japanese: 無垢軌道)	June 18, 2017
The remaining crew members arrive and retrieve Ido, whose consciousness is now trapped inside Triwaker. Meanwhile, fleets of the United Planets Force have started confiscating all of the Orichalt within the Miguel Net in a master plan to destroy Rajeev. Maya is shocked when Grayman refuses to take part in the master plan. However, she helps Ido back inside his MT System Unit, with his resolve to return to his I-Machine and rescue Alice from Addams. The Excavate Company plot a course for L2 near Earth, where the United Planets Force have stockpiled their Orichalt to entrap Rajeev, shown as wandering planets. After initial success, the United Planets Force fight a losing battle against Rajeev. Addams arrives in his I-Machine from an MT battleship and destroys Rajeev, firing artificial Orillian clones into the wandering planets and declaring himself the savior of humanity. Ido confronts Addams by saying that he learned through Kain's memories that Rajeev is capable of learning and evolving. As they speak, the wandering planets reform like antibodies reacting to a virus. Just as Ido and Addams are about to attack each other, Alice speaks for the first time, pleading for them to stop.
12	"Still Here"; Transliteration: "Jitsuzon Jinkaku" (Japanese: 実存人格)	June 25, 2017
Alice's body holds the consciousness of her mother Jennifer Record, who previously entered into the Orichalt to look for Alice. Jennifer believes that Alice's consciousness is contained within the Orichalt collected by Rajeev. Faced with this new knowledge, Ido grabs Jennifer and leaves with the Stulti. The United Planets Force decide to jettison the Orichalt to create an escape route for humanity, but Addams disagrees and attempts to transfer into Rajeev. At that moment, the Stulti appears before the fleet, and Grayman asks Admiral Cecilia Ginney of the United Planets Force to agree to a plan proposed by Ido. Cecilia approves after listening to the inspiring words of Clair and Maya. With assistance from the fleet's missiles, the Excavate Company blast their way into the center of Rajeev, where Ido and Jennifer then enter into its core. Jennifer reunites with Alice, while Ido and Addams eventually reconcile. Ido exits out of the core, surrounded by the rest of the crew members. Rajeev leaves, learning that there are other civilizations within the universe and no longer becoming a threat to humanity. The Excavate Company are recognized for their contribution to humanity and go on to pursue their own futures.
