= List of The Idolmaster Cinderella Girls episodes =

The Idolmaster Cinderella Girls is a 2015 anime series based on the simulation social network game of the same name as part of Bandai Namco Entertainment's The Idolmaster franchise. The series follows a group of rookie idols as they are recruited by 346 Production's Cinderella Project and aspire to become top idols. The anime is produced by A-1 Pictures and directed by Noriko Takao. Takao and writer Tatsuya Takahashi share supervision duty for the series screenplay, and Yūsuke Matsuo based the character designs on designs provided by illustrator Annin Dōfu; the music was composed by Hidekazu Tanaka of Monaca. The series aired in two separate seasons, alternating between reruns of the first The Idolmaster anime series. The first half aired on BS11 via satellite, and Tokyo MX and nine other local independent terrestrial stations between January 10 and April 11, 2015, and was simulcast by Daisuki. The second half aired from July 17 to October 17, 2015.

The opening theme for the first season is "Star!!" by Cinderella Project (Ayaka Ōhashi, Ayaka Fukuhara, Sayuri Hara, Tomoyo Kurosawa, Sumire Uesaka, Naomi Ōzora, Maaya Uchida, Nozomi Yamamoto, Ruriko Aoki, Aya Suzaki, Hiromi Igarashi, Natsumi Takamori, Yuka Ōtsubo, and Rei Matsuzaki). The second season's opening theme is "Shine!!" by Cinderella Project.

An anime adaptation of Kuma-Jet's Cinderella Girls Theater spin-off manga, produced by Gathering and directed by Mankyū, was announced on November 28, 2016, as part of the game's 5th anniversary via a 3-minute short film distributed online and premiered its first season which ran from April 4 to June 27, 2017. The series has since been renewed for three more seasons, with the second season premiering on October 3, 2017, the third running from July 3 to September 25, 2018 and the fourth, titled Climax Season, from April 2 to June 25, 2019.

== Cinderella Girls episodes ==
No.	Title	Original release date
1	"Who is in the pumpkin carriage?"	January 10, 2015
A young aspiring idol named Uzuki Shimamura is approached by the producer of the 346 Production talent agency to become an idol through its Cinderella Project. As Uzuki accepts the offer and begins training, the Producer sets his sights on recruiting another girl, Rin Shibuya, who shows little interest in becoming an idol and finds the Producer's constant advances a little creepy. However, after getting to know Uzuki and hearing how she desired to become an idol, Rin eventually gives in and joins the Cinderella Project with her.
2	"I never seen such a beautiful castle"	January 17, 2015
Uzuki and Rin arrive at 364 Pro's offices, where they meet the Cinderella Project's third new recruit, Mio Honda. While exploring the premises, the girls get to know the other members of the Cinderella Project. Later, veteran idol Mika Jougasaki asks Uzuki, Rin, and Mio to be her backup dancers for her next concert.
3	"A ball is resplendent, enjoyable, and..."	January 24, 2015
Uzuki, Rin, and Mio prepare for Mika's concert, and, despite some heavy nerves, manage to pull it off.
4	"Everyday life, really full of joy!"	January 31, 2015
Uzuki, Rin, and Mio are requested by the Producer to film a PR video of the entire group, interviewing each of the members. However, they run into trouble trying to get footage of the final member, Anzu Futaba, who does whatever she can to avoid being filmed. Afterwards, the Producer announces that Uzuki, Rin, and Mio, along with fellow members Anastasia and Minami Nitta, will form units that will make their debut CD.
5	"I don't want to become a wallflower"	February 7, 2015
While the chosen idols are both excited and nervous about their impending CD debuts, asked to come up with names for their units, the other idols, particularly Miku Maekawa, are less than happy that they are not making their debut. Despite making multiple requests to the Producer, they are simply told not to expect anything. Angered, Miku and some of the other idols hold a strike in the cafeteria demanding they get their debuts, which the Producer manages to calm down by explaining they all the idols will get their debuts eventually. Meanwhile, Anastasia and Minami name their unit Love Laika, while Uzuki's group settle with the unit name the Producer decided on, New Generations.
6	"Finally, our day has come!"	February 14, 2015
With both New Generations and Love Laika about to make their CD debut, they are due to hold a mini-concert at a shopping mall to promote the release. In the run-up to the concert, Mio mentions various queries to the Producer, which he does not think much of at the time. Although Love Laika manage to hold their own during their performance, New Generations struggle as, among other things, Mio appears shocked over something. Afterwards, Mio vents her frustration that, compared to the audience she experienced at Mika's concert, the turnout was far lower than her high expectations. When the Producer bluntly states that this was to be expected, Mio gets angry and claims that she will quit being an idol.
7	"I wonder where I find the light I shine..."	February 21, 2015
As Mio stops coming to the studio, the Producer tries to sort things out with her himself but is turned away. The next day, as Uzuki comes down with a fever, Rin confronts the Producer on his passive attitude, feeling he has betrayed her trust and storming out as well. After hearing Love Laika's thoughts on the other day's performance, the Producer pays a visit to Uzuki, who states that even though she has regrets about the mini-event, she is still optimistic about what the future holds for her as an idol. Spurred on by her positive attitude, the Producer becomes determined to shake off his cowardly behavior and bring Mio and Rin back. He first talks to Mio, showing her that even though her concert had few people in the audience, they were all filled with smiles. Realising the error of her ways, Mio apologises to Rin, stating her desire to still be idols again, with the Producer also apologising for his actions. With both Rin and Mio returning to the studio, New Generations reunite and set their sights on bigger stages.
7.5	"Special Program"	February 28, 2015
A recap episode hosted by the show's voice actors.
8	"I want you to know my hidden heart"	March 7, 2015
As Mio suggests that everyone each bring in a personal belonging to brighten up the office space, the Producer announces that goth lolita Ranko Kanzaki is going to make her solo CD debut. However, Ranko does not appear to be happy with the project being heavily focused on her dark persona, and the Producer has too much trouble deciphering her roleplay speak to understand why. With Ranko struggling to work up the courage to present her own pitch for the project, Rin encourages the Producer to try and understand Ranko better, helping her to ease up and convey her ideas properly, resulting in her debut becoming a success.
9	""Sweet" is a magical word to make you happy!"	March 14, 2015
After making their debut, Candy Island, a group formed of Kanako Mimura, Chieri Ogata, and Anzu Futaba, are nervous about making their first TV appearance on an idol game show. After receiving some training from Mio about how to be funny, the girls are shocked to find that the show's format has changed from a quiz show to an action-based variety show at the last minute. Despite the difficulties of the challenges, the girls manage to do well in portraying their personalities and appealing to the audience. After the teams learn that whoever loses will have to face a bungee jump, Chieri briefly faints, but is encouraged by her friends to try her hardest and make a comeback during the final quiz segment, in which Anzu shows off her surprising knowledge, with Chieri providing the winning answer. With the game ending in a tie, both teams end up receiving both self-promotion time and the bungee punishment.
10	"Our world is full of joy!!"	March 21, 2015
The next group Dekoration, formed of Kirari Moroboshi, Rika Jougasaki, and Miria Akagi, are set to appear at several events as part of a collaboration with the Pika Pika Pop clothes brand. After their first event, Mika, who was watching in disguise, gives the girls some advice on how to better captivate the audience, expressing some concern about the Producer letting them have too much freedom. Before their next event, the girls decide to stop for crépes, inspiring the Producer to take photos of them for the project's homepage. However, the girls become separated from the Producer when he gets taken in by a policeman after being mistaken for a pervert. After being bailed out by fellow staff member Chihiro Senkawa, the Producer, the girls, and Mika all end up going on a frantic search for each other. As Kirari blames herself for what happened, Rika and Miria encourage her to head towards their venue in costume, attracting everyone they come across to follow them and reuniting with the others in the process.
11	"Can you hear my voice from the heart?"	March 28, 2015
Miku, who enjoys cats and cute pop, and Riina Tada, who is obsessed with rock music, are reluctantly put into a unit together and struggle to get along with each other due to their clashing personalities and tastes. As Rika and Miria go to ask the Producer about why he put those two together, they learn about an Idol Festival that is in the planning stages, word of which soon spreads to the other idols. With the pair believing they will not be able to participate if they cannot get along, the others suggest that Riina move into Miku's dorm for a week so they can learn more about each other. Despite some bickering, they soon start to warm up to each other. Later, when a client comes to request a singing idol for a short-notice event, Miku immediately takes up the offer, despite the fact she and Riina have yet to sing together, feeling she wants to discover why the Producer chose them. With two days until the event, Miku and Riina work together to write some lyrics, eventually managing to combine their two different traits into something unique. Following a successful unit, Miku and Riina decide to remain in their unit, which they decide to name Asterisk after the Producer's placeholder name.
12	"The magic needed for a flower to bloom."	April 4, 2015
With the Producer needing to go away on business, Minami is put in charge of getting everyone prepared to perform as a group for the festival. This proves to be tough for a lot of the girls, who are having enough trouble with their unit songs. Noticing everyone's worries, including her own, Minami decides to change up the usual training routine by holding a variety of contests between the units, including racing, water gun fights, and jump rope. This helps to put everyone at ease and get in sync with each other, getting them excited for what lies ahead of them in their next concert. Impressed by her leadership skills, the group unanimously vote Minami to be their leader for the group performance.
13	"It's about time to become Cinderella girls!"	April 11, 2015
On the day of the idol festival, Minami overworks herself trying to help the group and develops a fever from anxiety, becoming distraught when the Producer tells her not to perform in her condition. With Minami not wanting Anya to perform by herself, Ranko steps up to take her place for Love Laika's performance. Both Ranko's and Love Laika's performances go well, but then a sudden thunderstorm causes a blackout at the arena just before the other acts are due to appear. Despite learning that most of the audience has left due to the rain, Mio and the rest of New Generations remain calm, manage to learn from the mistakes of the previous incident, and perform with smiles on their faces. After the other units finish their performances, Minami manages to recover from her fever and join the others for the group performance. As news of their performance spreads, the girls read letters and questionnaires from their fans, adding to the joy of their idol experience.
14	"Who is the lady in the castle?"	July 18, 2015
A woman named Mishiro is assigned as the new general executive producer of 346 Pro's idol division. Meanwhile, the Producer and the other idols become wary of a shadowy presence observing them from behind. As the girls keep their eyes peeled for what could potentially be a stalker, Rin is approached by Karen Hojo and Nao Kamiya, a pair of recently debuted 346 idols who attended her old middle school. As Riika meets guitarist and fellow rock idol named Natsuki Kimura, Mika spots Mayu Sakuma peeking on the Producer, suspecting she might be the stalker in question. Mayu later asks the girls to pass a letter onto the Producer, leaving them curious as to if a love confession is inbound. This soon turns out not to be true, as she is actually interested in another producer and just wanted to ask some information. A few days later, Mishiro announces her plans to disband all current idol projects and start anew.
15	"When the spell is broken..."	July 25, 2015
With the idols reeling from Mishiro's decisions, their futures left uncertain, the Producer becomes determined to figure out an alternative plan to save the Cinderella Project. As many of the idols are either downsized to smaller offices or forced to relocate, word spreads about top idol Kaede Takagaki turning down a big job offer from Mishiro, encouraging the other idols to try to help the Producer as much as they can. As Uzuki, Rin, and Mion help Kaede out at a local concert, which she had turned down the bigger job for, learning that she did what she did as the smaller venue is important to both her and her fans. As the girls feel inspired by Kaede's connection with her fans, the other idols present their own proposal, which the Producer presents to Mishiro.
16	"The light shines in my heart."	August 1, 2015
Mishiro allows the Producer to go ahead with his "Cinderella's Ball" proposal, stating that the results will determine whether the Cinderella Project will be allowed to continue. Meanwhile, Nana Abe, an idol Miku admires for her bunny persona, has her regular weather segment cut when Mishiro's decisions lead to changes to their division's approach to variety show work, steering away from character idols. Learning about this from Riina and the Producer, she goes to see Nana, becoming upset when she chooses to drop her bunny image for her promotional event. Asked by the Producer to think of what best brings out smiles, Miku encourages Nana to once again bring out her bunny persona, which makes both herself and her fans happy. Afterwards, the Producer approaches Nana's division, inviting their idols to collaborate with the Cinderella Project.
17	"Where does this road lead to?"	August 8, 2015
Mika feels frustrated as Mishiro has her promoting high-class adult makeup, which clashes with her usual gyaru style. Meanwhile, Rika and Miria are chosen to appear in a weekly classroom TV show in order to increase recognition for the Cinderella's Ball. As Rika struggles with playing the role of a kindergartner, fearing ridicule from her male classmates, she is snapped at by Mika for wanting to wear different clothes. The next day, Mika spends time with Miria, who has been feeling downhearted about her mother paying more attention to her new baby sister, and receives a little support from her. Meanwhile, Rika learns from her fellow idols to remain true to herself no matter what she wears, which in turn encourages Mika to do the same.
18	"A little bit of courage shows your way."	August 15, 2015
Anzu and Kirari are given their own segment on the TV show, with Kanako and Chieri, who are struggling with their shyness, also chosen to host recorded interviews for the segment. As Kanako and Chieri work hard to try and rectify their earlier mistakes, Kanako ends up collapsing from overtraining herself on a diet. Noticing their struggles, the Producer uses some candy given to him by Kirari while another idol unit encourages them to smile more. Meanwhile, Anzu asks Kirari about how she honestly feels about working with her.
19	"If you're lost, let's sing aloud!"	August 22, 2015
Mishiro decides to put Natsuki into an idol rock band, holding in-house auditions for other members. After speaking with Natsuki, Riina starts focusing more into exposing herself into rock, leading Miku to become concerned when she starts spacing out during idol work. Later, as Natsuki learns that she and her new bandmates have no control over the direction their band goes, she takes Riina on a ride, where she brings up the thought of having Riina join her band. After a mishap during their concert, Miku voices her concerns over whether Riina would rather join Natsuki's more rock-focused band, but Riina assures her that Asterisk is the unit she wants to be with. Understanding Riina's feelings, Natsuki accepts her resolve and invites her and Miku up on her stage for a one-off performance together. The next day, Natsuki pulls out of Mishiro's planned band and instead joins up with the Cinderella Project.
20	"Which way should I go to get to the castle?"	August 29, 2015
With an upcoming Autumn Festival serving as an assessment of the departments prior to the winter ball, Mishiro reveals her own "Project Krone", Mishio invites Rin to join a new unit called Triad Primus alongside Nao and Karen while suggesting Anastasia make her solo debut. As both girls, and the Producer, feel conflicted over what to do, Anastasia meets some of Project Krone's idols, Yui Otsuki and Fumika Sagisawa, while Rin talks with Nao and Karen, with each pairing giving the girls something to think about. Wanting to challenge herself, Anastasia ultimately decides to accept the offer, receiving support from both the Producer and Minami, while Rin talks to Uzuki and Mio about joining Triad Primus. After becoming shocked by this, Mio announces the next day that she'll also be making her solo debut.
21	"Crown for each."	September 5, 2015
As Mio begins doing solo drama work, making Rin uneasy, Minami reveals she'll be doing a solo for the Cinderella Project, putting further pressure on the others, as they have no time to practise together for the Autumn Festival. Meanwhile, it is revealed that Mio's decision to go solo was from a desire to see things from Rin's point of view. The next day, as the other idols decide it is best to discuss things as a group, they see how hard Minami is working to both succeed on her own and make the festival a success, while Mio shows Uzuki and Rin the efforts of her drama training, encouraging Rin to join Triad Primus so she can shine as well. With both New Generations and Love Laika taken out of the festival's lineup as a result, the Producer approaches Uzuki with forming a unit with Miho Kohinata so she can expand her potential too.
22	"The best place to see the stars."	September 12, 2015
The Autumn Festival gets underway, with Anya managing to give a successful solo performance. Meanwhile, Mio pays a visit to Rin to give her support, while Uzuki seems to be concerned about something. As the Cinderella Project's units give out great performances, Fumika Sagisawa, one of Project Krone's members, suddenly has a panic attack before her performance, pushing Triad Primus' performance ahead of schedule. Wanting to help, Mio and Uzuki rally the other girls to help appease the crowd and relieve the pressure placed on Triad Primus, allowing them to give their all in their performance. With Cinderella Project and Project Krone's combined efforts making the festival a success, Mishiro allows the Cinderella Project to continue based on how the division handled themselves. Later, as Rin and the Producer check up on Uzuki, they notice something seems to be wrong with her.
23	"Glass Slippers."	September 19, 2015
Wanting to not hold Rin and Mio back, Uzuki decides to take a break from work to return to training school and focus on the basics. Despite being told that she's doing fine, Rin and Mio, along with the Producer, become concerned for Uzuki, particularly when she turns down a New Generations event due to a lack of self-confidence. Believing that this change in Uzuki was the result of them taking on other projects, Rin and Mio go to try and convince her to perform with them. After being forced to face her problems instead of running away from them, Uzuki eventually reveals that she is scared of the prospect of never being able to shine like her fellow idols. As Rin and Mio assure Uzuki that it is because of her they were able to stay as idols, the Producer defends Uzuki as Mishiro pressures him into cutting her loose, choosing to have faith and wait for her.
24	"Barefoot Girl."	October 3, 2015
Although still unsure of herself, Uzuki returns to 346 Pro to train with the other idols, who reflect on everything that's happened in the six months since they joined the Cinderella Project with Uzuki. As Mio and Rin gather wishes from the other idols for their Christmas concert, the Producer remains firm in his stance to not fire Uzuki. The next day, the Producer takes Uzuki to a venue where she had attended a concert before, where he hears about all her fears and encourages her to believe in possibilities. Wanting to believe that she can shine, Uzuki joins Rin and Mio on stage, where the support of her friends and fans help her regain her natural smile.
25	"Cinderella Girls at the Ball."	October 17, 2015
The Cinderella's Ball finally begins, with the Cinderella Project girls encouraged by the Producer to smile as they do each of their routines. As Mishiro goes on site to observe the proceedings, the Producer states how they both have the ability to realise an idol's potential in ways the other cannot, showing there is more than one possibility. The time soon comes for Cinderella Project's turn, with each of the units giving performances filled with smiles before climaxing with a joint performance while Mishiro watches amongst the audience. Following the event, the Cinderella Project takes on new members, while all the current members continue to work hard with smiles on their faces.
26	"Anytime, Anywhere with Cinderella."	February 25, 2016

== Theater episodes ==
=== TV series ===
No.	Title (Note: All English episode titles are taken from Crunchyroll.)	Original release date
1	"Our Derella G Guest"; Transliteration: "Dereraji Gesuto Da Nya" (Japanese: デレラジゲストだにゃ)	April 4, 2017
2	"Splash Panic"; Transliteration: "Supurasshu Panikku" (Japanese: スプラッシュ★パニック)	April 11, 2017
3	"Dere-Radi...Guest...H-Hello..."; Transliteration: "Dereraji...Gesuto...Fuhi..." (Japanese: デレラジ…ゲスト…フヒ…)	April 18, 2017
4	"I'll Keep Asking Until It's All Gone"; Transliteration: "Nakunaru Made Tsudzukimasu" (Japanese: 無くなるまで続きます)	April 25, 2017
5	"Flower-Viewing in the Off Season"; Transliteration: "Kisetsuhazure no Ohanami" (Japanese: 季節外れのお花見)	May 2, 2017
6	"Cleanse My Wings"; Transliteration: "Dereraji Gesuto Da Nya" (Japanese: 我が翼を浄化せよ！)	May 9, 2017
7	"My Exciting Room"; Transliteration: "TOKIMEKI Mai Rūmu" (Japanese: TOKIMEKIマイルーム)	May 16, 2017
8	"Isn't This What Maids Do?"; Transliteration: "Meidotte Kō Desho?" (Japanese: メイドってこうでしょ？)	May 23, 2017
9	"Three Sister Detectives!"; Transliteration: "Sanshimai Keiji Dai 4 Wa: Sekushī & Girutī" (Japanese: 三姉妹刑事 第4話 SEXY&GUiLTY)	May 30, 2017
10	"When I Grow Up"; Transliteration: "Otona ni Nattara" (Japanese: 大人になったら)	June 6, 2017
11	"Theater Version Kirarin Robot's Steely Performance -Final Battle of the Glassy Empire!- Preview"; Transliteration: "Gekijō-ban Kōtetsu Kōen Kirarin Robo -Kessen! Gurasshī Teikoku- Yokoku-hen" (Japanese: 劇場版 鋼鉄公演きらりんロボ-決戦！グラッシー帝国- 予告篇)	June 13, 2017
12	"Can't Hide My Cuteness"; Transliteration: "Kawaii wa Kakusenai" (Japanese: カワイイは隠せない)	June 20, 2017
13	"Infinite Possibilities"; Transliteration: "Mugen no Kanōsei" (Japanese: 無限の可能性)	June 27, 2017
14	"My Precious..."; Transliteration: "Watashi no Taisetsu na..." (Japanese: 私の大切な…)	October 3, 2017
15	"The Trick Is To..."; Transliteration: "Pointo wa... Koko Da yo" (Japanese: ポイントは… ここだよ)	October 10, 2017
16	"I'm Confident in My Teeth"; Transliteration: "Ha ni wa Jishin ga Arimasu" (Japanese: 歯には自信があります)	October 17, 2017
17	"Trick or NEET"; Transliteration: "Torikku Oa Nīto" (Japanese: トリック オア ニート)	October 26, 2017
18	"Showing Off Ninja Arts"; Transliteration: "Misemasu Ninpō" (Japanese: 見せます忍法)	October 31, 2017
19	"Ranko Quest"; Transliteration: "Ranko Kuesuto" (Japanese: 蘭子クエスト)	November 7, 2017
20	"Touch..."; Transliteration: "Pitō..." (Japanese: ピトォ…)	November 14, 2017
21	"Everyone's Feelings"; Transliteration: "Minna no Kimochi ni" (Japanese: みんなのきもちに)	November 21, 2017
22	"Achoo!"; Transliteration: "Hakuchui!" (Japanese: はくちゅい!)	November 28, 2017
23	"Munakata Atsumi: Tallest Mountains Challenge! Three-Bout Battle!"; Transliteration: "Munakata Atsumi: Saikōhō ni Idome! 3 Ban Shōbu!" (Japanese: 棟方愛海 最高峰に挑め! 3番勝負!)	December 5, 2017
24	"Chomp!"; Transliteration: "Paku!" (Japanese: ぱくっ)	December 12, 2017
25	"Aiko Santa's Merry Problem"; Transliteration: "Santa Aiko no Tanoshī Nayami" (Japanese: サンタ藍子の楽しい悩み)	December 19, 2017
26	"Late-night Slumber Party"; Transliteration: "Yofukashi o Tomari-Kai" (Japanese: 夜ふかしお泊り会)	December 26, 2017
Arisu, Kaoru, Chie, Miria and Nina have a sleepover at Momoka's house.
27	"It's A Serious Game!"; Transliteration: "Honki no Shōbuda! No Kai!" (Japanese: 本気の勝負だ!の回)	July 3, 2018
28	"!! & !?"	July 10, 2018
29	"Win-Win?"	July 17, 2018
30	"Heated Warm-Up!"; Transliteration: "Nekketsu Junbi Undō!" (Japanese: 熱血準備運動!)	July 24, 2018
31	"Yoshino Shubababa"; Transliteration: "Yoshino Shubababa" (Japanese: 芳乃しゅばばば)	July 31, 2018
32	"Even If I'm the Audience!"; Transliteration: "Miru Gawa ni Natte Mo!" (Japanese: 見る側になっても！)	August 7, 2018
33	"Welcome to Oikawa Ranch"; Transliteration: "Yōkoso Oikawa Bokujō e" (Japanese: ようこそおいかわ牧場へ)	August 14, 2018
34	"The Summer's Night Sky and the Maiden's Cry"; Transliteration: "Natsu no Yozora to Otome no Himei" (Japanese: 夏の夜空と乙女の悲鳴)	August 21, 2018
35	"I Do Like Dirt, After All"; Transliteration: "Yappari Tsuchi ga Suki" (Japanese: やっぱり土が好き)	August 28, 2018
36	"I Didn't Run Away!"; Transliteration: "Nigeta Wake Janai Nya" (Japanese: 逃げたわけじゃないにゃ)	September 4, 2018
37	"Kanako and Kaede's Wandering Hot Springs Trip"; Transliteration: "Kanako to Kaede no Burari Onsen Tabi" (Japanese: かな子と楓のぶらり温泉旅)	September 11, 2018
38	"Chieri Round and Round"; Transliteration: "Chieri Guruguru" (Japanese: ちえりぐるぐる)	September 18, 2018
39	"Flower Fairies Mage Floral Yumi"; Transliteration: "Ohana no Yōsei Tsukai Furōraru Yumi" (Japanese: お花の妖精使い フローラル夕美)	September 25, 2018
40	"On the Rooftop"; Transliteration: "Okujōnite" (Japanese: 屋上にて)	April 2, 2019
41	"Thank You for Your Hard Work"; Transliteration: "Otsukaresama desu" (Japanese: おつかれさまです)	April 9, 2019
42	"Let Me Show You an Example"; Transliteration: "Otehon desu" (Japanese: お手本です)	April 16, 2019
43	"Who'll Be the Silly One?"; Transliteration: "Dare ga Bokemasu?" (Japanese: 誰がボケます?)	April 23, 2019
44	"I'll Do It for You"; Transliteration: "Yatte Ageru ne" (Japanese: やってあげるね)	April 30, 2019
45	"Munakator"	May 7, 2019
A parody of Predator featuring Munakata Atsumi as the main antagonist.
46	"Petting Miria"; Transliteration: "Nadenade Miria" (Japanese: なでなでみりあ)	May 14, 2019
47	"Teach Us, Sachiko-sensei!"; Transliteration: "Oshiete! Sachiko sensei!" (Japanese: 教えて!幸子先生)	May 21, 2019
48	"Fure Fure Mayu"; Transliteration: "Fure Fure Mayu" (Japanese: ふれふれまゆ)	May 28, 2019
49	"Out Of Control"; Transliteration: "Bōsō!? Tennen Meido" (Japanese: 暴走!?天然メイド)	June 4, 2019
50	"Beyond the Wind"; Transliteration: "Sono-saki no Kaze o" (Japanese: その先の風を)	June 11, 2019
51	"Playfulness at Its Peak"; Transliteration: "Asobigokoro ga Masaru o Toshigoro" (Japanese: 遊び心が勝るお年頃)	June 18, 2019
52	"Welcome, Newcomers!"; Transliteration: "Shinjin-san Irasshai!" (Japanese: 新人さんいらっしゃ～い!)	June 25, 2019
An episode featuring four of the seven new idols (the Hisakawa twins, Nagi and Hayate, as Miroir, and Chiyo Shirayuki and Chitose Kurosaki as VelvetRose) introduced to the Cinderella Girls franchise in early 2019 participating in a reality competition show hosted by New Generations (Uzuki Shimamura, Mio Honda and Run Shibuya) with the judges being Hikaru Nanjo, Hinako Kita, Hotaru Shiragiku (who arrives late at the end) and Kako Takafuji.

=== Web series ===
No.	Title (Note: All English episode titles are taken from Crunchyroll.)	Original release date
1	"Live Performance at Morn"; Transliteration: "Pikunikku Raibu" (Japanese: ピクニックライブ)	April 4, 2017
2	"What Will I Wear?"; Transliteration: "Don'na Ishō ka nā" (Japanese: どんな衣装かなぁ)	April 11, 2017
3	"We're Sleeping Together"; Transliteration: "Issho ni Netemasu" (Japanese: いっしょに寝てます)	April 18, 2017
4	"Expressions are Part of Your Glasses too" Transliteration: "Hyōjō mo Megane no Ichibu desu!" (Japanese: 表情も眼鏡の一部です！)	April 25, 2017
5	"Tell Me...Scary Stories"; Transliteration: "Nanafushigi...Oshiete" (Japanese: 七不思議…教えて)	May 2, 2017
6	"Gazing at the Sea and Dreaming"; Transliteration: "Umi o Mite Omou" (Japanese: 海を見て思う)	May 9, 2017
7	"Innocent Invitation"; Transliteration: "Tenshinranman na Ohanashii" (Japanese: 天真爛漫なお話い)	May 16, 2017
8	"Sleep with a Nice Scent"; Transliteration: "Ii Nioi de Nemurō" (Japanese: いい匂いで眠ろう)	May 23, 2017
9	"Producer Anzu"; Transliteration: "Anzu Purodyūsā" (Japanese: 杏プロデューサー)	May 30, 2017
10	"Karen's Slight Fever"; Transliteration: "Karen no Binetsu" (Japanese: 加蓮の微熱)	June 6, 2017
11	"I Feel Like I Can Do Anything!"; Transliteration: "Nandemo Dekichai sō!" (Japanese: なんでもできちゃいそう！)	June 13, 2017
12	"Giving and Receiving"; Transliteration: "Agete Moratte" (Japanese: あげて・もらって)	June 20, 2017
13	"Will You Indulge Me?"; Transliteration: "Amaete Ii desu ka" (Japanese: 甘えていいですか)	June 27, 2017
14	"A Zvezda I Don't Know?"; Transliteration: "Watashi no Shiranai Zvezda?" (Japanese: 私の知らないズヴェズダ?)	October 3, 2017
15	"Karin VS..."; Transliteration: "Karin Bāsasu..." (Japanese: 歌鈴VS…)	October 10, 2017
16	"Twilight Premonition"; Transliteration: "Tasogare no Yokan" (Japanese: 誰そ彼の予感)	October 17, 2017
17	"Miracle Pitch?"; Transliteration: "Makyū?" (Japanese: 魔球?)	October 26, 2017
18	"Communicating from the Heart"; Transliteration: "Kokoro no Koe wo Tsutaeyō" (Japanese: 心の声を伝えよう)	October 31, 2017
19	"Youthful Attractions"; Transliteration: "Seishun Atorakushon" (Japanese: 青春アトラクション)	November 7, 2017
20	"Those Old Track Team Habits..."; Transliteration: "Rikujō no Toki no Kuse de..." (Japanese: 陸上の時のクセで…)	November 14, 2017
21	"Rockin' Place, Right?"; Transliteration: "Koko wa "Atsui" Daro?" (Japanese: ここは「あつい」だろ?)	November 28, 2017
22	"6th Anniversary Cinderella Quiz"; Transliteration: "6 Shūnen Da yo Cinderella Quiz" (Japanese: 6周年だよシンデレラクイズ)	November 21, 2017
23	"Photograph Me, Producer!"; Transliteration: "Pī-kun Totte" (Japanese: Pくん撮って☆)	December 5, 2017
24	"We Jest, Mistress"; Transliteration: "Otawamure wo Ojou-sama" (Japanese: お戯れをお嬢様♪)	December 12, 2017
25	"Camouflage?"; Transliteration: "Ka Mo Fura ̄Jiyu?" (Japanese: かもふらーじゅ?)	December 19, 2017
26	"Uzuki's Present"; Transliteration: "Uzuki no Purezento" (Japanese: 卯月のプレゼント)	December 26, 2017
27	"Pinky Swear Gently"; Transliteration: "Yubikiri o Yasashiku" (Japanese: ゆびきりを優しく)	July 3, 2018
28	"Where Used Articles Go"; Transliteration: "Ofuru no Yukue" (Japanese: お古のゆくえ)	July 17, 2018
29	"I Sometimes Forget"; Transliteration: "Tamani Wasureru" (Japanese: たまに忘れる)	July 31, 2018
30	"Do You Want to Hear Me Out?"; Transliteration: "Atashi no Hanashi Kikitai?" (Japanese: アタシの話聞きたい?)	August 14, 2018
31	"What Are You Talking About?"; Transliteration: "Nani no Hanashi?" (Japanese: 何の話?)	August 28, 2018
32	"Fre-song Special Version"; Transliteration: "Furesongu SPver" (Japanese: フレソングSPver)	September 11, 2018
33	"Rin-chan Has Talent"; Transliteration: "Rin-chan Soshitsu Ari" (Japanese: 凛ちゃん素質アリ)	September 25, 2018
34	"In Daydreams and In Reality"; Transliteration: "Mōsō Demo Genjitsu Demo!" (Japanese: 妄想でも現実でも!)	April 2, 2019
35	"Choose with My Gut!"; Transliteration: "Watashirashiku Erabu!" (Japanese: 私らしく選ぶ!)	April 16, 2019
36	"Putting Everything Into this One Kick"; Transliteration: "Kono Isshū ni Subetewo!" (Japanese: この一蹴に全てを!)	April 30, 2019
37	"I Felt a Gaze"; Transliteration: "Shisen o Kanjita" (Japanese: 視線を感じた)	May 14, 2019
38	"Noriko's Fuel"; Transliteration: "Noriko no Nenryō" (Japanese: 法子の燃料)	May 28, 2019
39	"Something...for Relief!"; Transliteration: "Rirīfu wa...Kore!" (Japanese: リリーフは…これ!)	June 11, 2019
40	"I Didn't Slip Up!"; Transliteration: "Subettoranshi!" (Japanese: スベっとらんし!)	June 25, 2019

=== Blu-ray specials ===
No.	Title	Original release date
1	"Be Careful"; Transliteration: "Ki wo Tsukete ne" (Japanese: 気をつけてね)	June 28, 2017
2	"Drawing Time"; Transliteration: "Minna de Oekaki" (Japanese: みんなでお絵描き)	July 26, 2017
3	"Clattering Vacancy"; Transliteration: "Gattsuri Bakansu" (Japanese: がっつりバカンス)	November 29, 2017
4	"The Fragrance of Romance is" Transliteration: "Roman no Kaori wa" (Japanese: ロマンの香りは)	December 22, 2017
