= Straw Millionaire =

Japanese folk tale

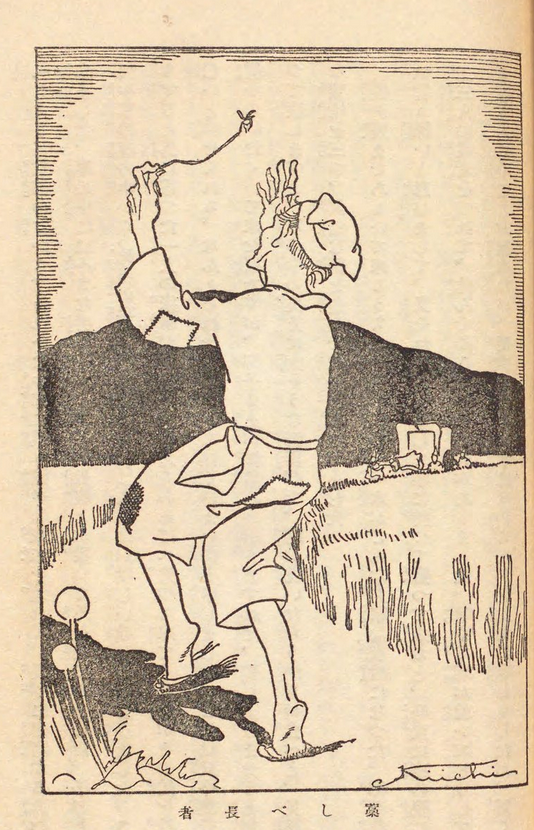
Straw Millionaire by Kiichi Okamoto in Kunio Yanagita's Nihon Mukashibanashi-Shu

The legend of the Straw Millionaire (わらしべ長者, Warashibe Chōja), also known as Daietsu or the Daikokumai, is a Japanese Buddhist folk tale about a poor man who becomes wealthy through a series of successive trades, starting with a single piece of straw. It was likely written during the Heian period and was later collected into Konjaku Monogatarishū and Uji Shūi Monogatari. It became popular during the Muromachi period. It has become a common anecdote in Japanese popular culture.

== Plot ==
A hard-working but unlucky peasant named Daietsu-no-suke prays to Kannon, the goddess of mercy, to help him escape poverty. Kannon tells him to take the first thing he touches on the ground with him and travel west. He stumbles on his way out of the temple and grabs a piece of straw. While traveling, he catches a horsefly that was bothering him and ties it to the straw. In the next town, the buzzing horsefly calms a crying baby and the thankful mother exchanges it for three oranges. Taking the oranges, he continues on his journey and encounters a dehydrated woman. He gives her the oranges and she thanks him by giving him a rich (silk) cloth. The peasant meets a samurai with a weak horse. The samurai demands the silk cloth in exchange for his horse. The peasant nurses the horse back to health and continues west. A millionaire is impressed by his horse and invites him to his home. The millionaire's daughter turns out to be the same woman he saved with his oranges. Seeing this as a sign, the millionaire insists that the peasant marry his daughter, making him a millionaire.

As part of oral tradition, the details of the story have changed over time and there are several competing accounts of the tale. Some versions portray the peasant as a soldier who trades the horse for rice fields and becomes a successful farmer, omitting the millionaire's daughter.

== In popular culture ==
- One red paperclip, a project in which a paperclip was traded up to a house, was inspired by this story.
- In many The Legend of Zelda games, the player follows a long trading quest which ultimately results in a unique weapon or item. Developers cite this legend as inspiration.
- Similarly to the above example, the Japanese game Gloria Union features an optional trading quest in which the hero Ishut trades a series of flags emblazoned with different fish, finally exchanging the last flag for a manta ray cape. The manta ray is a holy animal in the game's culture, and completing the trading quest for the cape unlocks the game's best ending.
- Junji Kinoshita, a Japanese author and playwright, published a collection of adapted Japanese folk tales under the title Straw Millionaire.
- In the Hyouka anime and series of light novels, protagonist Hōtarō trades several items with customers at his school club's cultural festival booth, referencing the story by name.
- In Suikoden, to obtain a Star of Destiny called Sarah, the hero has to obtain a bar of soap and has to go through a series of trades for it.
- In an episode of Star Trek: Deep Space Nine called Progress, Jake and Nog acquire surplus sauce that Quark has been unable to sell. The two make a succession of trades, eventually ending up with a strip of land on Bajor.
- In an episode of The Office called Garage Sale, Dwight attempts to walk away with the most expensive item by trading smaller items with his office mates, beginning with a thumbtack and continuously trading up from table to table. One item on Jim and Pam's table that piques his interest is a packet of "miracle legumes", for which he eventually trades a $150 telescope.
- In the manga and anime series The Disastrous Life of Saiki K., Saiki performs a series of psychic exchanges in order to retrieve enough money to pay for a meal at a restaurant, in a story inspired by this legend.
- In YuruYuri season 3, episode 8, Rise Matsumoto stars in a short, silent film in a Straw Millionaire-style series of fortuitous exchanges.
- In Kiniro Mosaic, Alice Cartelet performs a similar series of exchanges after reading the tale.
- In the third episode of the anime This Art Club Has a Problem!, the tale is referenced.
- In Fire Emblem: Three Houses, the player has the ability to complete an optional quest for Catherine or Shamir that involves a series of trades to obtain a two-toned whetstone. The player can give this to Catherine or Shamir for a Silver Sword or a Silver Bow respectively.
- In BanG Dream!'s mobile rhythm game BanG Dream! Girls Band Party!, in the event story Smile Patrol! Reporting for Duty!!, Hello, Happy World! accidentally goes through a series of trades while out one day and helps the people they traded with smile. All the while, Misaki comments that this unlikely series of trades sounds like this tale.
- In Dead or Alive Xtreme Venus Vacation, during Koharu's Dolce birthday event, the story entailed the Owner leaving a spoon for Koharu to find as a set up for the character's birthday party in an explicit reference to the plot of the Straw Millionaire.
- In Perfect World International, a quest given out by an NPC named Li Mengpai is titled "Paperclip for Villa", which is a reference to this tale in concept.
- Japanese VTubers from Nijisanji, Tsukino Mito and Kenmochi Toya uploaded two-part video of them compete using this method in July 2025. The plan was to exchange with fellow Nijisanji members: Tsukino started with a furikake and Kenmochi with 3 character cards featuring himself. Tsukino ended up with two Louis Vuitton earrings which costs about 900,000yen in total, and Kenmochi with an earphones and a high quality mic that values up to 860,000 yen.
- The American reality show Barter Kings is about two men who go around trading items of lesser value for valuable items, similar to the premise of this folk tale.

== See also ==
- Gudbrand on the Hill-side, a Norwegian folk tale about the reverse situation: A man makes a series of ever-worse trades.
