= List of A Channel episodes =

A Channel is a Japanese anime television series produced by Studio Gokumi based on the 4-panel manga series by bb Kuroda. It follows the daily lives of four friends, Tōru, Run, Yūko and Nagi. The twelve-episode series aired in Japan between April 8, 2011, and June 24, 2011. Bonus +A Channel mini episodes were included on Blu-ray Disc and DVD volumes released between May 25, 2011, and October 26, 2011. Sentai Filmworks have licensed the series in North America. An original video animation titled A Channel + smile was released on March 21, 2012.

The opening theme is "Morning Arch" by Marina Kawano while the ending theme is "Humming Girl" (ハミングガール, Hamingu Gāru) by Aoi Yūki, Kaori Fukuhara, Minako Kotobuki and Yumi Uchiyama. Each episode also features an insert song sung by the voice cast. For the OVA, the opening theme is "Balloon Theatre" (バルーンシアター, Barūn Shiatā) by Kawano while the ending theme is "Smile Equation" (スマイル方程式, Sumairu Hōteishiki) by Yūki, Fukuhara, Kotobuki and Uchiyama.

== Episode list ==
=== A Channel ===
No.	Title	Original air date
1	"Love - An April Day"; Transliteration: "Suki - An April Day" (Japanese: 好き - An April Day)	April 8, 2011
Upon visiting her friend, Run Momoki, to tell her she managed to get into her high school, Tōru Ichii finds her in a compromising position with one of her classmates, Yūko Nishi, who Tōru takes an instant disliking to. School soon begins, with Tōru showing hostility to anyone who gets too close to Run, and Yūko and their other friend, Nagisa "Nagi" Tennōji, making sure Run doesn't hurt herself with her aloofness. After school, Tōru admits she feels lonely being in a separate class from Run, but Run assures her that nothing's changed between them.
2	"A Bath on a Rainy Day - As rain fell" Transliteration: "Ame no Hi wa Ofuro - As rain fell" (Japanese: 雨の日はお風呂 - As rain fell)	April 15, 2011
Run gets into a little trouble when she forgets to put on her panties in the morning. Yūko goes into a little panic when Run collapses, though it turns out to be just a bit of sleep deprivation. After having to deal with heavy rain, the girls spend the evening at Nagi's house to dry off. While Run and Nagi take a bath, Tōru forces Yūko to sit through a scary movie before continuing to tease her during their bath time. A little while later, the girls leave with some umbrellas they borrowed, but soon return after Yūko gets herself dirty again.
3	"Classmates - All good to go" Transliteration: "Dōkyūsei - All good to go" (Japanese: 同級生 - All good to go)	April 22, 2011
In her first year class, a classmate named Yutaka Imai becomes overly friendly towards Tōru, which bothers her a bit. Meanwhile, a new health teacher, Sachiyo Satō, becomes attracted towards Run due to her forehead, which naturally bothers Tōru. It is later revealed that Satō is physically weak himself. As Yutaka becomes increasingly clingy to Tōru, her friend Miho Noyama tries to keep her in check, though this admittedly makes Tōru feel lonely.
4	"Kilogram - Attention to your weight" Transliteration: "Kiroguramu - Attention to your weight" (Japanese: きろぐらむ - Attention to your weight)	April 29, 2011
As the students clean the school up, Miho gets to know Tōru, much to Yutaka's chagrin, while the other girls have some fun cleaning the pool. Later, Nagi becomes concerned that she's gaining weight and goes on a diet, but is later convinced that she shouldn't force herself to do so.
5	"Sea - An ocean far away" Transliteration: "Umi - An ocean far away" (Japanese: 海 - An ocean far away)	May 6, 2011
After noticing the first years hanging around the pool, Run suggests a trip to the beach for summer vacation. Yūko and Nagi go swimsuit shopping, while Run gives Tōru her swimsuit from elementary school, due to Tōru's small stature. They soon arrive at the beach, where they have fun playing in the sea and sand.
6	"A Midsummer Night's... - A school in summer" Transliteration: "Manatsu no Yoru no... - A school in summer" (Japanese: 真夏の夜の… - A school in summer)	May 13, 2011
Run ends up giving Tōru an undesirable haircut, but manages to fix it into something she appreciates. Tōru has trouble dealing with her erratic teachers while Yūko mistakes Yutaka's way of dusting out her neckerchief as a cry for help. When Yūko forgets a form she needs to fill in at school, the gang decide to sneak into the school at night to retrieve it, as well as do some exploring. As Nagi and Yūko go to the bathroom, they spot a strange glow outside, which they later discover to be Satō who then collapses, forcing the others to carry him to the nurse's office. At the end of the day, Yūko still forgets to collect her form.
7	"Summer Festival - August's End"; Transliteration: "Natsu Matsuri - August's end" (Japanese: 夏祭り - August's end)	May 20, 2011
The girls go to a karaoke bar, where Tōru is nervous about singing in front of Run, but Run helps her out by singing a duet with her. Later, the girls go to a matsuri festival, where they become so engrossed in one of the stalls that they almost miss the fireworks.
8	"New Term - Abnormal circumstance" Transliteration: "Shin-Gakki - Abnormal circumstance" (Japanese: 新学期 - Abnormal circumstance)	May 27, 2011
As summer vacation ends and school resumes, Tōru's homeroom teacher, Kimiko Kito, is unusually energetic. Meanwhile, Yutaka continues to harass Tōru, with Miho explaining why they became such fans of her. Later, Tōru and Run end up having an argument, which lead their respective friends to become concerned for them the next day. As Run notices that Tōru had anonymously bought her a drink, she finds her on the roof where they make up with each other.
9	"Present - Abstract art" Transliteration: "Purezento - Abstract art" (Japanese: プレゼント - Abstract art)	June 3, 2011
As Halloween approaches, the girls decide to hold a small get-together. Nagi receives a strange plush doll from Run, which she has trouble identifying. While Run and Yūko attempt to make food for the party, with messy results, Tōru and Nagi go to buy some snacks, where they find a dirty manga with a heroine that looks like Yūko. After Run's failure at trying to make hotcakes from a mix, the girls decide to make some together from scratch.
10	"Fizzy - Act up" Transliteration: "Tansan - Act up" (Japanese: 炭酸 - Act up)	June 10, 2011
As Winter settles in, Tōru finds an abandoned kitten and decides to take care of it. After showing the cat to the others, Tōru goes with Run to visit a pet shop and a family restaurant, where Run comes with a name for the cat, Tansan. The next day, snow falls at school and the students have fun playing in the snow, except for Nagi who is noticeably bothered by the cold. By the next day, however, everyone but Nagi catches colds.
11	"Birthday - Allow me" Transliteration: "Tanjōbi - Allow me" (Japanese: たんじょうび - Allow me)	June 17, 2011
As Tōru's birthday approaches, Run remembers how Tōru helped her study for her high school entrance exams two years ago. Run brings in some cake into school for Tōru's birthday, some of which she spikes with wasabi. As they go home that day, Tōru starts to worry that at the end of the next school year, Run will graduate.
12	"Alien - Anytime"; Transliteration: "Uchūjin - Anytime" (Japanese: 宇宙人 - Anytime)	June 24, 2011
Tōru is worried about the prospect of being left alone after Run and the others eventually graduate. While cleaning up leaves, Yutaka attempts to rescue a cat stuck up a tree. Later, Yūko collects point cards at a fast food restaurant for a free prize, while everyone does impressions of each other. After having a weird dream about Run, Tōru becomes more worried about her fears until she spots Run outside her apartment building, feeling happy that she hasn't changed.

=== +A Channel ===
No.	Title	Original release date
1	"Uniform"; Transliteration: "Seifuku" (Japanese: 制服)	May 25, 2011
Tōru comes over to Run's house to try on her new school uniform.
2	"Noooo!"; Transliteration: "Iyaya" (Japanese: いやや)	May 25, 2011
Tōru tricks Yūko into coming with her and the others to a scary movie, which scares her so much that she tries to force it out of her memory.
3	"Participation"; Transliteration: "Sanka" (Japanese: 参加)	June 22, 2011
Kimiko becomes annoyed when Satō interrupts her class.
4	"Right now" Transliteration: "Imashita" (Japanese: いました)	June 22, 2011
Run comes home and is surprised to find Tōru spring out of her bed.
5	"Show me" Transliteration: "Misete" (Japanese: 見せて)	July 27, 2011
When asked by Yūko if she would be willing to change her image, Nagi demonstrates why she hasn't really done so.
6	"Exploring"; Transliteration: "Tanken" (Japanese: 探検)	July 27, 2011
Yūko shows how bad she is at video games before having to deal with a cockroach in her house.
7	"Such a Day"; Transliteration: "Konna Hi Kurai wa" (Japanese: こんな日くらいは)	August 24, 2011
While preparing for the summer festival, Nagi experiments with her hairstyle.
8	"It came" Transliteration: "Kimashita" (Japanese: きました)	August 24, 2011
When Yūko misplaces her recorder, the resulting conversation leads to another misunderstanding between her and Tōru.
9	"Scary"; Transliteration: "Kowai" (Japanese: 怖い)	September 21, 2011
Yūko becomes scared one night when she believes she's being followed.
10	"Mr. Genzō"; Transliteration: "Genzō-san" (Japanese: 源三さん)	September 21, 2011
On a cold day, Run and Nagi discuss what could make sitting in the classroom warmer.
11	"Character Bento"; Transliteration: "Kyara-ben" (Japanese: キャラ弁)	October 26, 2011
The girls split into teams and compete with each other to make the best home-made bento lunch.

=== A Channel + smile ===
No.	Title	Original release date
EX01	"Mountain of Pancakes - An accident" Transliteration: "Yamamori Pankeki - An accident" (Japanese: やまもりパンケーキ - An accident)	March 21, 2012
Kimiko injures her hand during class and has to deal with it while Tōru brings Tansan to school with her to meet Yutaka and Miho. Later, the girls decide to get pancakes at a café where Miho happens to be working, facing trouble when Yutaka shows up out of the blue.
EX02	"A Picture of a Wish - A Happy new year" Transliteration: "Ema ni Onegai - A Happy new year" (Japanese: 絵馬にお願い - A Happy new year)	March 21, 2012
Yūko catches a cold so the others pay her a visit and help look after her. Later, the girls get together for the New Year's shrine visit.
EX03	"Let's have hot pot - Alexandrite in the pot" Transliteration: "Nabe o tabeyō - Alexandrite in the pot" (Japanese: 鍋を食べよう - Alexandrite in the pot)	September 27, 2017
Tōru goes to great lengths to find Run, who has been away from her classroom during breaks all morning. Later, the girls gather at Tōru's house to have a hot pot party.
