= List of animated television series of 2013 =

This is a list of animated television series first aired in 2013.

Animated television series first aired in 2013
Title	Seasons	Episodes	Country	Year	Original channel	Technique
ADHD Shorts	1	13	United States	2013–16	Fox	Flash
The Adventures of Napkin Man!	3	60	Canada; United States	2013–17	Kids' CBC	Flash/Live action
The Adventures of Noko Mashaba			South Africa	2013	YouTube	Flash
The Adventures of the Young Marco Polo	2	52	Canada; Germany; Ireland; Luxembourg	2013–19	KiKa	Flash
Alisa Knows What to Do!	1	24	Russia	2013–16	STS; Carousel	CGI
Angry Birds Toons	3	104	Finland	2013–16	Toons.TV	Flash/Traditional
Animanimals	2	52	Germany	2013–22	KiKa	Flash
Animism	2	26	Canada	2013–14	APTN Kids	Flash
Aroha Bridge	3	22	New Zealand	2013–19	The New Zealand Herald (season 1); Māori Television, Stuff (season 3)	Flash
A.R.T. Investigation	1	52	France	2013	France 3	Flash
Avengers Assemble	5	127	United States	2013–19	Disney XD	Traditional
The Awesomes	3	30	United States	2013–15	Hulu	Flash
Axe Cop	2	22	United States	2013–15	Fox (2013); FXX (2015)	Traditional
Baby U		26	United States	2013	BabyFirstTV	Flash
Balloopo	2	78	South Korea	2013–14	EBS	CGI
Bellbug Popo	1	52	South Korea	2013	KBS1	CGI
Beware the Batman	1	26	United States	2013–14	Cartoon Network	CGI
La Bitácora de Nando	3	52	Venezuela	2013–16	ConCiencia TV	Flash
Boing the Play Ranger	2	52	South Korea	2013–16	EBS	CGI
Boris	3	79	France	2013–19	France 5	Flash
Bounty Hunters	1	13	Canada; United States	2013	CMT	Flash
Brawl of the Objects	1	13	United States	2013–18	YouTube	Flash
Brinken: Skate Revolution	1	40	China	2013–15		Traditional
Bubble Cook Expedition	2	52	South Korea	2013–15	MBC	Flash
Burka Avenger	4	52	Pakistan	2013–16	Geo Tez (season 1); Nickelodeon Pakistan (seasons 2–4)	CGI
Camp Lakebottom	3	65	Canada	2013–17	Teletoon; Disney XD (United States)	Flash
Carotina Super Bip	4	78	Italy	2013–17	Nick Jr.	
Charley Goes to School	2	104	France	2013–16	France 5	CGI
Clay Kids	2	52	Spain	2013–15	Gloob	Stop motion
Code Lyoko: Evolution	1	26	France	2013	France 4 Canal J	CGI/Live action
Color Crew	2	52	United States, Germany	2013–15	BabyFirstTV	Flash
Copy Cut	1	52	France	2013–15	Canal+ Family	Flash
Creative Galaxy	3	36	United States; Canada	2013–19	Amazon Prime Video	CGI/Flash
The Crumpets	4	105	France	2013–21	Canal+ Family (seasons 1–3); Télétoon+ (season 4)	Flash
The Day My Butt Went Psycho!	2	40	Australia; Canada	2013–15	Nine Network; Teletoon; Netflix	Flash/Toon Boom
The Deerskins	2	26	Canada	2013–14	APTN	Flash
Dobi Dobi Mansion	1	52	South Korea	2013–14	MBC TV	Flash
Dofus: The Treasures of Kerubim	1	52	France	2013–14	France 3	Flash
Doki	3	76	Canada, Latin America	2013–19	Discovery Kids	Flash
The Doozers	2	72	Canada, United States	2013–18	Hulu	CGI
Duda & Dada	3	78	South Korea	2013–21	EBS1	CGI
Dude, That's My Ghost!	1	52	France; United Kingdom	2013	Orange Cinema Series; Disney XD	Flash
Ella the Elephant	1	52	Canada	2013–14	TVOKids	CGI; Traditional
Entong	2	33	Indonesia	2013	MNCTV	CGI
Eu e o Quarteto Apavorante	2	26	Brazil	2013–14	TV Rá-Tim-Bum	Flash
Ever After High	5	68	United States	2013–16	YouTube	Flash
La Familia del Barrio	5	94	Mexico	2013	MTV	Flash
Fırıldak Ailesi	3	80	Turkey	2013–16	Star TV (2013); YouTube Channel (2013–16) teve2 (2014); TV8 (2015–16)	Flash
Flapper and Friends	2	26	Poland	2013–14	MiniMini+	Stop motion
Golan the Insatiable	2	12	United States	2013–15	Fox	Flash
Good Morning Today	1	20	United States	2013–14	Fusion TV	CGI
Grojband	1	26	Canada	2013–15	Teletoon; Cartoon Network (United States)	Flash
Haunted Tales for Wicked Kids	2	40	Brazil	2013–16	Cartoon Network Brazil	Flash
Henry Hugglemonster	2	49	United States; Ireland	2013–15	Disney Junior	CGI
High School USA!	1	12	United States	2013–15	Fox; FXX (episode 6)	Flash
Hoodies Squad	6	291	Poland	2013–present	YouTube; Comedy Central	Flash
Horatio & the Plasticines			Chile	2013	TVN	Stop motion/Live action
Hubert & Takako	1	78	France	2013–15	Gulli; Canal+ Canal J	Flash
Hulk and the Agents of S.M.A.S.H.	2	52	United States	2013–15	Disney XD	Traditional
It's a Small World: The Animated Series	1	9	United States	2013–14	Disney.com	Flash
Jar Dwellers SOS	2	52	Australia, Canada, Colombia	2013–18	Eleven, ICI Radio-Canada, Telemedellín	Flash
Juliette, Generation 7.0	1	20	France	2013	Arte	Traditional
Julius Jr.	2	52	United States	2013–15	Nick Jr.	Flash
The Jungle Bunch to the Rescue	3	158	France	2013–20	France 3	CGI
JV: The Extraordinary Adventures of Jules Verne	1	26	Italy	2013	Rai 2	Traditional
Kainar	2	52	China	2013–14		CGI
Kara the Animation	1	5	South Korea	2013		Traditional
Keluarga Somat		26	Indonesia	2013–17	Indosiar	CGI
Kiwi	3	130	France	2013	France 5	Stop motion
Knight Rusty	2	52	Germany	2013–14	KiKa	CGI
Kukuli			Turkey	2013	YouTube	CGI
Lalaloopsy	2	52	United States	2013–15	Nickelodeon; Nick Jr. Channel	Flash
Lanfeust Quest	1	26	France	2013–14	M6	CGI
Legends of Chima	3	41	Denmark	2013–14	Cartoon Network	CGI
Lego Star Wars: The Yoda Chronicles	2	7	Denmark	2013–14	Cartoon Network, Disney XD	CGI
Leliko	2	65	Turkey	2013–17	Planet Çocuk	CGI
Little Groom Koong	2	52	South Korea	2013–14	KBS2	Traditional
The Little Train Choo Choo	2		South Korea	2013–15	KBS2	CGI
Llan-ar-goll-en	2	51	United Kingdom	2013–16	S4C	Flash/Live action
Lucas Bros. Moving Co.	2	17	United States	2013–15	Fox, FXX	Flash
Mademoiselle Zazie	1	13	France, Singapore	2013–14	France 5	CGI
Mansour	5	105	United Arab Emirates	2013–19	Abu Dhabi TV, Sama Dubai TV	CGI
Mask Masters	1	26	South Korea	2013	KBS1	CGI
Max Steel (2013)	2	52	Canada, United States, United Kingdom	2013–14	Cartoon Network, Disney XD, Netflix	CGI
Me and My Robot	1	52	France; South Korea	2013	EBS (South Korea), France 3 (France)	CGI
Mickey Mouse	5	96	United States	2013–19	Disney Channel	Flash
Mily Miss Questions	2	130	France	2013	France 5	
Mimi & Líza			Slovakia	2013	RTVS	
The Misfortune of Being Ned	2	20	United States	2013–14	YouTube	Flash
Mofy	3	78	Japan; Italy	2013–17	Rai 2 Rai Yoyo; NHK	Stop motion
Monica Toy	13	344	Brazil	2013–present	YouTube	Flash
Monsters vs. Aliens	1	26	United States	2013–14	Nickelodeon	CGI
Mother Up!	1	13	Canada; United States	2013–14	Hulu; City	Flash
Mr. Trance	3	52	Colombia	2013–19	Señal Colombia	Flash
El Mundo de Ania y Kin			Peru	2013	América Televisión	Flash
Nina Sahabatku		26	Indonesia	2013	Indosiar	CGI
Ninoo's Speaking	1	39	France	2013	Canal+ Family	Flash
Noob & Nerd	1	8	Germany	2013	einsfestival	
Oddbods	4	216	Singapore	2013–24	Disney Channel, CITV, Boomerang, Netflix (season 3), YouTube (season 4 and specials)	CGI
Oh No! It's an Alien Invasion	2	40	Canada	2013–15	YTV (season 1); Teletoon (season 2)	CGI
Old Folks' Tales			Colombia, Spain	2013	Señal Colombia	
Osmar: The Heel of the Loaf	2	52	Brazil	2013–15	Gloob	Flash
Out There	1	10	United States	2013	IFC	Flash
The Owl & Co	2	156	France	2013	France 3, Boomerang	CGI
Pac-Man and the Ghostly Adventures	3	52	United States; Japan; Canada	2013–15	Disney XD; Tokyo MX	CGI
Packages from Planet X	1	52	Canada; United States	2013–14	Teletoon; Disney XD	Flash
Paint Me a Story	2	30	Israel; United Kingdom	2013	BabyTV	Flash
Patchwork Pals	2	52	Germany	2013–20	KiKa	Flash
Paw Patrol	12	289	Canada	2013–present	TVOKids; Nickelodeon/Nick Jr. Channel	CGI
Peg + Cat	2	63	United States; Canada	2013–18	PBS Kids; Treehouse TV	Flash
Pipo, My Imaginary Friend	3	39	Colombia	2013–15	Señal Colombia	Flash
Planet Cosmo	1	15	Ireland	2013	RTÉ Two	Flash
Power Top Plate	2	39	South Korea	2013–14	SBS	Traditional
Q Pootle 5	1	52	United Kingdom	2013	CBeebies	CGI
Quaid Say Baatein	2		Pakistan	2013–present		CGI
Rabbids Invasion; Les Lapins Crétins : Invasion	4	104	France, United States	2013–18	Nickelodeon, France 3, Nicktoons, Netflix	CGI
Rat-A-Tat	14	741	India	2013–2026	Nickelodeon India; Nickelodeon Sonic	Flash
Red Bicycle	2	281	South Korea	2013–15	KBS1	
Rick and Morty	9	91	United States	2013–present	Adult Swim	Flash
Rita & Crocodile	2	26	Denmark	2013–18	Filmstriben	Flash
Rocket Monkeys	3	66	Canada	2013–16	Teletoon	Flash
RWBY	9	117	United States	2013–present	Rooster Teeth, Crunchyroll	CGI
Sabrina: Secrets of a Teenage Witch	1	26	United States	2013–14	Hub Network	CGI
Samufly		26	Indonesia	2013	Indosiar	Traditional
Sanjay and Craig	3	60	United States	2013–16	Nickelodeon	Traditional
Sarah & Duck	3	120	United Kingdom	2013–17	CBeebies	Flash
School Land			South Korea	2013	EBS	
Sendokai Champions	3	53	Spain	2013–present	Clan	CGI
Smosh Babies	5	56	United States	2013–17	YouTube	Flash
Socks	1	26	Germany, Spain	2013	KiKa	CGI
Sofia the First	4	109	United States	2013–18	Disney Junior	CGI
Steven Universe	5	160	United States	2013–19	Cartoon Network	Traditional
Taka & Maka	1	40	France	2013	Antenne Réunion	CGI
Tayo's Sing Along Show	2	26	South Korea	2013–15	EBS	CGI
Teen Titans Go!	9	447	United States	2013–present	Cartoon Network	Flash
Too Cool! Cartoons	1	11	United States	2013–14	YouTube	Traditional/Flash
Trolls of Troy	1	78	France	2013–14	Canal+ Family	
Turbo Fast	3	52	United States	2013–16	Netflix	Flash
Uncle Grandpa	5	153	United States	2013–17	Cartoon Network	Traditional
Vic the Viking	2	78	France; Germany; Austria; Netherlands; Australia	2013–14	TF1; ZDF; Network Ten (season 1); Eleven (season 2); ABC3	CGI
ViR: The Robot Boy	3	81	India	2013–16	Hungama TV	CGI
Vuelta por el Universo	1	26	Argentina	2013	Pakapaka	Flash
The Wakos	8	129	France	2013–present	YouTube	Traditional/Flash
Wander Over Yonder	2	43	United States	2013–16	Disney Channel; Disney XD	Traditional (season 1); Flash (season 2)
Wendy	1	26	Germany, United Kingdom	2013	KiKa	CGI
What's the Big Idea?	1	52	France	2013	France 5	CGI
Xiaolin Chronicles	1	26	France, United States	2013–15	Disney XD	Traditional/CGI
YOUniverse	2	26	Canada	2013	TVOKids	Flash
Yup Yups	1	50	Canada	2013	Disney Junior	CGI
Zinba	1	52	China	2013		Traditional
ZuZu & the Supernuffs	1	8	Australia	2013	KidsCo	Flash

Anime television series first aired in 2013
Title	Episodes	Country	Year	Original channel	Technique
Ace of Diamond	75	Japan	2013–15		Traditional
Ai-Mai-Mi	13	Japan	2013	KBS	Traditional
Aiura	12	Japan	2013		Traditional
AKB0048: Next Stage	13	Japan	2013		Traditional
Amnesia	12	Japan	2013		Traditional
Arata: The Legend	12	Japan	2013		Traditional
Arpeggio of Blue Steel -Ars Nova-	12	Japan	2013		CGI
Attack on Titan	25	Japan	2013	MBS	Traditional
Baku Tech! Bakugan Gachi	39	Japan	2013		CGI
Bakumatsu Gijinden Roman	12	Japan	2013	TV Tokyo	Traditional
Battle Spirits: Saikyou Ginga Ultimate Zero	49	Japan	2013–14		Traditional
Battle Spirits: Sword Eyes Gekitōden	21	Japan	2013		Traditional
Beast Saga	38	Japan	2013		Traditional
Beyond the Boundary	12	Japan	2013		Traditional
BlazBlue Alter Memory	12	Japan	2013		Traditional
Blood Lad	10	Japan	2013		Traditional
Brothers Conflict	12	Japan	2013		Traditional
Calimero	104	Japan	2013–15	TF1, TXN	Traditional/CGI
Cardfight!! Vanguard: Link Joker	59	Japan	2013–14		Traditional
A Certain Scientific Railgun S	24	Japan	2013		Traditional
Chihayafuru 2	25	Japan	2013		Traditional
Chronicles of the Going Home Club	12	Japan	2013		Traditional
Coppelion	13	Japan	2013		Traditional
Cuticle Detective Inaba	12	Japan	2013		Traditional
Da Capo III	13	Japan	2013		Traditional
Danchi Tomoo	78	Japan	2013–15		CGI
Danganronpa: The Animation	13	Japan	2013		Traditional
Date A Live	12	Japan	2013		Traditional
Day Break Illusion	13	Japan	2013		Traditional
DD Fist of the North Star	13	Japan	2013		
The Devil Is a Part-Timer!	13	Japan	2013	Tokyo MX	Traditional
Devil Survivor 2: The Animation	13	Japan	2013	MBS	Traditional
Devils and Realist	12	Japan	2013		Traditional
Diabolik Lovers	12	Japan	2013		Traditional
Dog & Scissors	12	Japan	2013		Traditional
DokiDoki! PreCure	49	Japan	2013–14		Traditional
Duel Masters Victory V3	51	Japan	2013–14		
Eagle Talon Max	38	Japan	2013–14	NHK E	Flash
The Eccentric Family	13	Japan	2013		Traditional
Encouragement of Climb	12	Japan	2013		Traditional
Fantasista Doll	12	Japan	2013		Traditional
Fate/kaleid liner Prisma Illya	10	Japan	2013		Traditional
The Flowers of Evil	13	Japan	2013		
Free! - Iwatobi Swim Club	12	Japan	2013		Traditional
Freezing Vibration	12	Japan	2013		Traditional
Futari wa Milky Holmes	12	Japan	2013		Traditional
Gaist Crusher	51	Japan	2013–14		Traditional
Galilei Donna	11	Japan	2013		Traditional
Gargantia on the Verdurous Planet	13	Japan	2013		Traditional
Gatchaman Crowds	12	Japan	2013		Traditional
gdgd Fairies 2	12	Japan	2013		CGI
Genshiken: Second Generation	13	Japan	2013		Traditional
Gifū Dōdō!! Kanetsugu to Keiji	25	Japan	2013		Traditional
Gingitsune	12	Japan	2013		Traditional
GJ Club	12	Japan	2013	NTV	Traditional
Glass no Kamen Desu ga	17	Japan	2013		Flash
Golden Time	24	Japan	2013–14		Traditional
Gundam Build Fighters	25	Japan	2013–14		Traditional
Haganai NEXT	12	Japan	2013		Traditional
Haitai Nanafa 2	13	Japan	2013	QAB	Traditional
Hajime no Ippo: Rising	25	Japan	2013–14		Traditional
Hakkenden: Eight Dogs of the East	13	Japan	2013		Traditional
Hakkenden: Eight Dogs of the East 2	13	Japan	2013		Traditional
Hayate the Combat Butler: Cuties	12	Japan	2013		Traditional
The "Hentai" Prince and the Stony Cat.	12	Japan	2013		Traditional
High School DxD New	12	Japan	2013		Traditional
Hyakka Ryōran: Samurai Bride	12	Japan	2013		Traditional
Hyperdimension Neptunia: The Animation	12	Japan	2013		Traditional
I Couldn't Become a Hero, So I Reluctantly Decided to Get a Job	12	Japan	2013		Traditional
Inazuma Eleven GO: Galaxy	43	Japan	2013–14		Traditional
Infinite Stratos 2	12	Japan	2013		Traditional
Ishida & Asakura	12	Japan	2013		Traditional
Jewelpet Happiness	52	Japan	2013–14		Traditional
Karneval	13	Japan	2013		Traditional
Kill la Kill	24	Japan	2013–14		Traditional
Kin-iro Mosaic	12	Japan	2013		Traditional
Kingdom 2	39	Japan	2013–14		Traditional
Kotoura-san	12	Japan	2013		Traditional
Kuroko's Basketball 2	25	Japan	2013–14		Traditional
Kyousougiga	10	Japan	2013		Traditional
Leviathan: The Last Defense	13	Japan	2013	TXN	Traditional
Little Battlers eXperience Wars	37	Japan	2013		Traditional
Little Busters! Refrain	13	Japan	2013		Traditional
Log Horizon	25	Japan	2013–14	NHK E	Traditional
Love Lab	13	Japan	2013		Traditional
Love Live! School Idol Project	13	Japan	2013		Traditional
Lovely Movie: Lovely Muuuuuuuco!	21	Japan	2013		
Magi: The Kingdom of Magic	25	Japan	2013–14		Traditional
Majestic Prince	24	Japan	2013		Traditional
Mangirl!	13	Japan	2013	Tokyo MX, Sun TV, AT-X	Traditional
Maoyu	12	Japan	2013		Traditional
Meganebu!	12	Japan	2013		Traditional
Minami-ke: Tadaima	13	Japan	2013		Traditional
Mini Van	37	Japan	2013		Flash
Miss Monochrome: The Animation	13	Japan	2013		Traditional
Monogatari Series Second Season	26	Japan	2013		Traditional
Muromi-san	13	Japan	2013	Tokyo MX, MBS, TVS, Chiba TV, TVK	Traditional
Mushibugyō	26	Japan	2013	TXN	Traditional
My Teen Romantic Comedy SNAFU	13	Japan	2013	TBS	Traditional
Nagi-Asu: A Lull in the Sea	26	Japan	2013–14		Traditional
No Matter How I Look at It, It's You Guys' Fault I'm Not Popular!	12	Japan	2013		Traditional
Non Non Biyori	12	Japan	2013		Traditional
Noucome	10	Japan	2013		Traditional
Nyarko-san: Another Crawling Chaos W	12	Japan	2013		Traditional
Oreimo 2	13	Japan	2013		Traditional
Oreshura	13	Japan	2013		Traditional
Oshiri Kajiri Mushi 2	32	Japan	2013–14	NHK BSP	
Outbreak Company	12	Japan	2013		Traditional
Phi Brain: Puzzle of God 3	25	Japan	2013–14		Traditional
Photo Kano	13	Japan	2013		Traditional
Pretty Rhythm: Rainbow Live	51	Japan	2013–14		Traditional
Problem Children Are Coming from Another World, Aren't They?	10	Japan	2013		Traditional
Pupipō!	15	Japan	2013–14		Traditional
Recorder and Randsell Mi	12	Japan	2013		Traditional
Red Data Girl	12	Japan	2013		Traditional
Ro-Kyu-Bu! SS	12	Japan	2013		Traditional
Rozen Maiden: Zurückspulen	13	Japan	2013		Traditional
Samurai Flamenco	22	Japan	2013–14		Traditional
Sasami-san@Ganbaranai	12	Japan	2013	TBS	Traditional
Senran Kagura: Ninja Flash!	12	Japan	2013	AT-X	Traditional
Senyu	13	Japan	2013		Traditional
Senyu 2	13	Japan	2013		Traditional
Servant × Service	13	Japan	2013		Traditional
The Severing Crime Edge	13	Japan	2013		Traditional
Silver Spoon	11	Japan	2013		Traditional
A Simple Thinking About Blood Type	12	Japan	2013	Tokyo MX	
Sparrow's Hotel	12	Japan	2013	AT-X, KBS	Traditional
Stella Women's Academy, High School Division Class C3	13	Japan	2013	TBS	Traditional
Straight Title Robot Anime	12	Japan	2013		CGI
Strike the Blood	24	Japan	2013–14		Traditional
Sunday Without God	12	Japan	2013		Traditional
Super Seisyun Brothers	14	Japan	2013	TV Tokyo	Traditional
Symphogear G	13	Japan	2013		Traditional
Tamagotchi! Miracle Friends	29	Japan	2013–14		Traditional
Tamako Market	12	Japan	2013		Traditional
Tamayura: More Aggressive	12	Japan	2013		Traditional
Tanken Driland: Sennen no Mahō	51	Japan	2013–14		Traditional
Teekyu 2	12	Japan	2013		Traditional
Teekyu 3	12	Japan	2013		Traditional
Tenkai Knights	52	Japan, Canada	2013–14	Cartoon Network	Traditional
Tesagure! Bukatsu-mono	12	Japan	2013	NTV	CGI
Tetsujin 28-go Gao!	151	Japan	2013–16	Fuji TV	
Tokyo Ravens	24	Japan	2013–14		Traditional
A Town Where You Live	12	Japan	2013		Traditional
Unbreakable Machine-Doll	12	Japan	2013		Traditional
Unlimited Psychic Squad	12	Japan	2013		Traditional
Uta no Prince-sama: Maji Love 2000%	13	Japan	2013		Traditional
Valvrave the Liberator	12	Japan	2013	MBS	Traditional
Valvrave the Liberator 2	12	Japan	2013	MBS	Traditional
Vividred Operation	12	Japan	2013		Traditional
Walkure Romanze	12	Japan	2013		Traditional
Wanna Be the Strongest in the World	12	Japan	2013		Traditional
White Album 2	13	Japan	2013		Traditional
The World God Only Knows: Goddesses	12	Japan	2013		Traditional
Yamishibai: Japanese Ghost Stories	13	Japan	2013		
You're Being Summoned, Azazel Z	13	Japan	2013		Traditional
Yowamushi Pedal	38	Japan	2013–14		Traditional
Yozakura Quartet ~Hana no Uta~	13	Japan	2013		Traditional
Yuyushiki	12	Japan	2013		Traditional

== See also ==
- List of animated feature films of 2013
- List of Japanese animation television series of 2013
