= Pepee =

Turkish animated series

- Genre: The animated series Preschool education
- Created by: Ayşe Şule Bilgiç
- Composer: Kiraç
- Country of origin: Turkey
- Original languages: Turkish; English
- No. of seasons: 8
- No. of episodes: 208

Production
- Running time: 10–30 minutes
- Production company: Düşyeri

Original release
- Network: TRT Çocuk (2008–2013); Show TV (2014–2015); Planet Çocuk (2015–2017)
- Release: November 1, 2008 – August 20, 2016

Related
- Pocoyo; Oddbods; Leliko; RGG Ayas; Pisi

Pepee is a Turkish 3D animated television series produced by Düşyeri for TRT Çocuk. The series was created by Ayşe Şule Bilgiç. The first episode aired as a preview on November 1, 2008.

== Characters ==
- Pepee: is the main character of the series. He is a young boy full of curiosity who loves to play games and discover new things. He is very acrobatic and moves at a quick speed. He is always shown wearing blue clothes and a hat. His best friends are Şila, Zulu, and Şuşu.
- Şuşu (pronounced Shu-shu): speaks over the entire show, and often communicates directly with the characters. Pepee has a good relationship with her, and is always to delighted to see (hear) her. She is reminiscent of Portuguese and Spanish language Brazilian children's program presenter Xuxa (pronounced "Şuşa" or "Shu-sha").
- Bebee: Pepee's sister.

== Legal trouble ==
In 2013, Zinkia Entertainment, the company who licenses the Spanish cartoon character Pocoyo, brought a lawsuit against Düş Yeri Bilişim Teknoloji for copyright infringement of their character, claiming among other things that even the name is Spanish. Following the decision in favor of Zinkia, which resulted in the cancellation of the Pepee trademark, another lawsuit was brought up in 2018, demanding a compensation of 100 thousand Turkish liras.

== Series overview ==
Season	Episodes		
Season	Episodes	Season premiere	Season finale
1	26	June 6, 2008	November 28, 2008
2	26	April 17, 2009	October 9, 2009
3	26	February 26, 2010	August 20, 2010

== International release ==
Country / Region	Channel	Series premiere	Title in country
Azerbaijan	ARB Günəş		Pepee
Turkey	TRT Çocuk (2008–2013); Show TV (2014–2015); Planet Çocuk (2015–2017)	June 6, 2008	Pepee
Iran	IRIB Pooya		پپه
Arabia	Nick Jr.		پپه
