= List of Gatchaman Crowds episodes =

Artwork for the first Gatchaman Crowds volume that was released in Japan in both DVD and Blu-ray format.

Gatchaman Crowds (ガッチャマンクラウズ, Gatchaman Kurauzu) is a 2013 anime television series produced by Tatsunoko Production. It is the fifth Japanese-produced animation project based on the original 1972 anime series Science Ninja Team Gatchaman, and is directed by Kenji Nakamura. The series aired on NTV between July 12 and September 27, 2013, and was simulcast by Crunchyroll. A second season, titled Gatchaman Crowds insight, started airing on July 4, 2015.

The first season has been licensed by Sentai Filmworks and is streaming on The Anime Network. The second season will be streamed on Hulu, starting with a special episode to air on June 20, 2015.

For the first season, the opening theme is "Crowds" by White Ash whilst the ending theme is "Innocent Note" by Maaya Uchida. For the second season, the opening theme is "insight" by White Ash whilst the ending theme is "Roku-jū-oku no Tsubasa" (60億の翼, 6 Billion Wings) by Angry Frog Rebirth.

== Gatchaman Crowds ==
| No. | Title | Original release date |
|---|---|---|
| 1 | "Avant-garde" | July 12, 2013 |
Hajime Ichinose is a rather eccentric schoolgirl who is obsessed with notebooks. One day, she is approached by a mysterious man named JJ who pulls out a journal called a NOTE from her body, declaring her to be the new member of the elusive Gatchaman team. She later follows the words appearing in her NOTE to the mall, where a Gatchaman named Sugane Tachibana manages to defeat an alien that had disguised itself as a human. Later that day, Sugane brings Hajime to the Gatchaman's hideout where she meets the other members, Joe Hibiki, OD, Utsutsu, and their leader, Paiman. Sugane explains that their duty is to protect Earth from a hostile alien race known as the MESS that has been abducting humans. Hajime and Sugane are soon called upon by JJ to fight a MESS at the bus station, during which Hajime transforms for the first time, whilst a mysterious figure watches.
| 2 | "Asymmetry" | July 19, 2013 |
Hajime annoys Sugane after she ends up interfering and allowing the MESS to escape. The next day, Hajime moves into a new apartment block where the other Gatchaman live. Later that day, Hajime teaches Sugane about a popular social app called GALAX, which allows users in the vicinity to help each other, and decides to take him to an offline meet-up. Later, as Hajime and Sugane are sent in to fight another MESS, Hajime chooses not to fight it but instead communicate with it, managing to befriend it. Meanwhile, as the mysterious figure causes another accident, someone named Rui revels in the success of the GALAX app whilst wielding their own NOTE.
| 3 | "Futurism" | July 26, 2013 |
After Hajime befriended the MESS, which she decided to nickname Messy, there hasn't been any more abduction cases involving the MESS, who had released all the humans they abducted, leading the other Gatchaman to become curious as to whether they were hostile at all. The next day, GALAX users at Hajime and Sugane's school receive word from Rui, under the guise of X, that some spoiled milk has been sent to their school, prompting Hajime and the other students to try to get the word out. With help from Sugane, Hajime manages to warn the other students and shut down the vending machines distributing the milk. Later that day, when a helicopter crash puts some citizens on a gondola at risk, Rui approves the usage of something known as 'Crowds' whilst Joe comes across a curious alien capable of assuming a human's form by kissing them.
| 4 | "Kitsch" | August 2, 2013 |
The Crowds are revealed to be strange beings controlled by the GALAX users, which help to stabilise the gondola until help arrives. Meanwhile, Joe fights against the strange alien, known as Berg Katze, but is beaten back when Katze uses a NOTE of their own. As Joe relays this to the others, Paiman and OD remain oddly quiet on the matter. Later, Hajime hears from Utsutsu about her power and how it keeps her from touching others. Meanwhile, it is shown Rui gained the Crowds ability from Berg drawing out his NOTE. The next day, Rui is shocked to witness Berg use another human's form to run down and kill several innocent citizens right in front of him.
| 5 | "Collaboration" | August 9, 2013 |
As Hajime discusses with Sugane and Paiman about why the Gatchaman are so secretive, Rui speaks with one of his 'Hundred', Umeda, who has his own ideals that Crowds should be used to kill evil politicians and earn the credit, against Rui's vision of a selfless world. Meanwhile, as Hajime and the others join another GALAX offline meeting, they come across a tunnel where the ceiling is collapsed and begin to help the wounded. With the situation being too much for them alone, Rui reluctantly permits the use of Crowds to help evacuate the citizens. When a fire breaks out, Hajime makes the decision to activate her Gatchaman powers.
| 6 | "Originality" | August 16, 2013 |
Despite knowing the risk it puts her life in, Utsutsu uses her power to heal the wounded, with Joe lending her his life force as well. Meanwhile, Sugane is at a loss for words when Hajime reveals her identity to Rui, which is captured on camera and broadcast across the city. The next day, as Hajime and Utsusu try to evade the press, she receives an invitation to meet with Rui in exchange for a successful escape with the help from some chosen GALAXers. They soon arrive at a hotel where they meet Rui, later joined by Sugane, who was also invited. Rui states that Gatchaman are unnecessary in the world he is trying to create with GALAX, though Hajime straight out rejects his suggestion to quit being Gatchaman.
| 7 | "Abjection" | August 23, 2013 |
Rui decides to face against Katze using the might of Crowds, but becomes overwhelmed when Katze uses their Gatchaman power. As Joe arrives on the scene to fight Katze, Sugane hears from Rui about the power he had received from them. With Joe becoming easily defeated by Katze, Hajime and Utsutsu arrive on the scene with help from Paiman's Gatchaman form, with Hajime questioning Katze before they retreat whilst Utsutsu heals the injured.
| 8 | "Genuine" | August 30, 2013 |
Katze copies Rui's form in order to take control of his X program, locking him out of the GALAX network. Meanwhile, Hajime suggests the Gatchaman reveal themselves to the public by holding an event at a kindergarten, where Hajime warns everyone about Katze and asks Rui to come meet them there. As Katze uses Rui's form to meet Umeda and set up a new Neo Hundred for the Crowds, Rui gets to the kindergarten, where he learns from a girl who has her father in a coma that the Crowds users who were defeated by Katze had become hospitalized.
| 9 | "Forgery" | September 6, 2013 |
Hajime takes Rui to her apartment, where she cheers him up and Utsutsu heals his wounds. Meanwhile, Katze gives the Crowds program to all the people Rui declined to give it to because they were too dangerous, and have them attack several government buildings along with Umeda. Before going into action, Hajime sets up a 'Gatchannel' live stream, where Rui publicly apologies over the usage of Crowds, urging those that have it to not use it, and Hajime explains that the Gatchaman will confront Katze even if she is still unsure they can win. Inspired by Hajime, Sugane goes to the Gatchaman Cage and tells JJ they do not need his prophecies anymore, and will protect the world on their own.
| 10 | "Crowds" | September 13, 2013 |
Hajime encounters Katze on GALAX, who leaves her with a cryptic poem before instructing the Neo Hundred to go after the prime minister, offering a rare Crowds to whoever can take him down. As the Crowds attack Tachikawa, the Gatchaman arrive and make the Crowds visible to normal humans, before working to capture them so that their users won't slip into comas. Joe, having lost confidence in himself, prepares to leave with the evacuees, but receives a message from Sugane, encouraging him to fight again. As the man who assigned as the Neo Hundred's leader, Koichi Umeda, objects to attacks occurring in the city his wife and daughter lives in, he falls into despair when Katze turns on him and posts his personal information on the Internet.
| 11 | "Gamification" | September 20, 2013 |
The Gatchaman look back on how Hajime has influenced their lives since joining them. Meanwhile, Rui manages to get reunite with X once more, allowing the Gatchaman and the citizens to receive assistance from the GALAX network. Hajime gets the Prime Minister Sugiyama to broadcast on the Gatchannel, where he shows more of his honest side and requests everyone sign up to GALAX, before he helps with the evacuation efforts. However, Katze suddenly appears in the guise of Sugiyama, luring the citizens to utilize Crowds.
| 12 | "Collage" | September 27, 2013 |
Chaos ensues with more citizens using Crowds and fighting against each other as OD calls Katze out to the Gatchaman's hideout for a showdown. As Katze makes their way to meet OD, Hajime talks with them and promises she will not kill them, inviting them on a "date" after everything is settled. Katze and OD fight, and although OD is heavily damaged by Katze, they manage to retrieve Rui's NOTE and deliver it to him. Rui then sends every GALAX user a Crowds app to take part in a "Tachikawa Crowds Game", setting up various types of games to encourage users to help out the community and defeat the Neo Hundred Crowds. After the situation is dealt with, Hajime gives her mother a call and reassures her that no matter what happens she will always be herself, and then goes to meet with Katze for their "date" showdown. A year later, the use of Crowds has become widespread, and Hajime, now in her third year of high school, makes her way to school while talking with Katze, whose voice comes out from Hajime herself.
| OVA | "Embrace" | January 22, 2014 |
Director's cut of episode 12. The first half of this episode is the second half of the original episode 12, with the addition of some new short scenes. The second half is totally new material, including a segment showing Hajime's face-off with Katze, with her fusing herself with them by absorbing their NOTE into her body.

== Gatchaman Crowds Insight ==
| No. | Title | Original release date |
|---|---|---|
| 0 | "Inbound" | June 20, 2015 (on Hulu) |
After a brief summary of the events of the first season narrated by Sugane, Prime Minister Sugiyama's plane is attacked by two fighter jets hijacked by the mysterious VAPE organization, composed of anonymous users of red-colored Crowds. Upon being informed of the situation by X, Rui transforms himself into a Gatchaman and transports himself and Hajime to inside the plane in order to fend off the attackers, while also transporting Joe to destroy the jets in the air with Sugane's help. After the situation is resolved, an alien craft is seen in route of crash landing in Nijima, and Hajime takes her leave with the others, claiming that they will not only welcome an alien visitor, but a new member of the Gatchamen as well.
| 1 | "Contact Point" | July 4, 2015 |
The ship crash lands in a rural area near the house of a young girl called Tsubasa Misudachi. Soon after, Hajime, Utsutsu and Paiman appear and an alien being emerges from the ship as well, who introduces himself as Gelsadra. Meanwhile, Suguyama and Joe discuss VAPE's recent activity and the recent drop in the population's support of the current CROWDS system, and the troubles it may cause to the Prime Minister's plans for re-election. While gathering at Tsubasa's house, Hajime and the others discuss the meaning of J.J.'s latest prediction, which not only forecasted Gelsadra's arrival, but also warns them that the Gatchamen will have a new member, before the press arrives there to interview them, creating a commotion. In the occasion, J.J. appears before Tsubasa and draws a blue-colored NOTE from her body, making her the newest Gatchaman, and preparations are being made by the election of the new mayor of Tachikawa City, which for the first time will be done via the GALAX network.
| 2 | "Penetration" | July 11, 2015 |
As preparations are made for tomorrow's smartphone election, Rui is confronted VAPE's mastermind, Rizumu Suzuki, who is using his own Note to summon the Red CROWDS in order to disprove Rui's ideals. Meanwhile, Hajime, Tsubasa, and Gelsadra make a public appearance, where Tsubasa has trouble transforming on demand. When the event is attacked by Red CROWDS, with the Blue CROWDS stepping in to fight against them, Rui is forced to terminate the Blue CROWDS wielders' accounts to prevent further damage. The next day, as Tsubasa moves to Tokyo to be with the Gatchaman, the early results of the smartphone elections come in.
| 3 | "Launch" | July 18, 2015 |
After participating in Milhione's talk show with O.D., Tsubasa and Gelsadra are taken to the Gatchamen's base and introduced to the rest of the team. In the occasion, the group discuss the meaning behind J.J. latest prediction and VAPE's intentions, with Rui's opinions regarding the CROWDS system conflicting with Joe and Sugane's. Back at her apartment, Hajime learns from Berg Katze that he was the one who extracted Rizumu's NOTE, curious about how he would react should he snaps. In the next day, the Red CROWDS appear in Shibuya, attacking the population, but the Blue CROWDS prove themselves too weak against them, forcing the Gatchamen to enter the fray. Amidst the battle, Rizumu contacts Rui and demands him to hand over his NOTE, using the lives of the civilians as a leverage against him. Rui complies with his demand, claiming that they can eventually come to an agreement, but Rizumu instead stabs Rui's NOTE, wounding him seriously. Tsubasa, who was sitting out of the fight by O.D.'s instructions, decides to help Rui as well, and rushes to assist him while successfully transforming, eventually reaching his location with Gelsadra's help.
| 4 | "2:6:2" | July 25, 2015 |
Tsubasa and Gelsadra arrive to confront the Red CROWDS in order to save Rui, but just as the fight begins, Rizumu surrenders, claiming that he achieved his objective. Rui reprimands both for interfering before collapsing, and is put under Utsutsu's care. Despite the incident being solved, doubts among the population regarding the CROWDS system intensify, just as Rizumu predicted, and Prime Minister Sugayama decides to resign from his post, waging his position in a smartphone election in which anyone in the country can participate and vote. After discussing the matter with Hajime and the others, Gelsadra decides to run for Prime Minister himself during an appearance on Milhione's show in order to create the peaceful society he envisions, transforming himself in an adult in the occasion in order to be an eligible candidate.
| 5 | "Halo Effect" | August 1, 2015 |
The Prime Minister election will be held in one week and Sugayama holds a huge lead in the polls. After using his powers to read the minds of people, Gelsadra announces that his first meaasure should he become elected will be to abolish the CROWDS system, and despite having not fully recovered, Rui summons the others and confronts Gelsadra about it. Gelsadra then claims that he intends to bring down the CROWDS system just because it's the people's will and Joe agrees with him, deciding to support his campaign. Thanks to Joe's successful planning and a few mistakes coming from Sugayama's part which were exaggerated by the media, Gelsadra rises in the polls during the next days, leaving much doubts about who among them will win the election. As the election day approaches, Hajime approaches Joe and points out that he is helping Gelsadra against his will, and he answers that despite not being against the CROWDS system, he does not want another incident like the battle at Shibuya happen again, as during that time, not only did dozens of people get hurt, but Rui almost got himself killed as well. The day of the election comes, and Hajime invites Rui to pay a visit to Rizumu in the prison, as they still had not finished their conversation yet. At the time, Rizumu reveals that his intentions were to show how the power of CROWDS could destroy the world should the masses follow the wrong lead. As they discuss, it is announced that Gelsadra was chosen as the new Prime Minister, and Rizumu, claiming that he had already expected that, affirms that the election ended with the worst possible scenario.
| 6 | "Engagement" | August 8, 2015 |
Taking command as the new Prime Minister of Japan, Gelsadra works flawlessly to increase the government's efficiency while walking among the population like a normal citizen and getting along with them, always accompanied by Tsubasa, who is still having trouble to properly transform into a Gatchaman. However, while paying a visit to her home in Nijima, Tsubasa has a heated discussion with her great-grandfather, who claims that her and Gelsadra's belief of attaining peace by having all of mankind thinking the same way is wrong. Upon returning, Gelsadra announces that all of Japan's cabinet will be solely composed of himself and the Diet will be reassigned to other functions, promising to resign should the people vote against his decisions. After the population gives their approval, Gelsadra is asked by Hajime about his true feelings, as no one sees the bubbles that appear on the top of everybody else's heads over his when he uses his powers. He then asks her in return if she really did not change at all upon sealing Berg Katze inside her body. Soon after, Gelsadra holds another election to decide if the CROWDS system should be revoked, and despite Rui making a speech on its favor, Rizumu is later informed on prison that the population voted for its abolition.
| 7 | "Outbound" | August 15, 2015 |
Following the abolition of the CROWDS system, the Japanese society keeps improving towards peace thanks to Gelsadra's government, while Gelsadra himself starts felling ill, when the Gatchamen are summoned by J.J., who warns them of a "Red Angel" and "Gentle Beasts with many names". The members of the team then discuss if said angel could be Gelsadra, and they ask Tsubasa to watch over him in their place. However, Gelsadra's condition worsens and he confesses to Tsubasa that it is because despite all his efforts, mankind still refuses to think as one, as no decision was reached by a unanimous decision in any of the votes. After some encouragement from Tsubasa, Gelsadra has the idea of changing the structure of the votes, including along the usually the "Yes" and "No" options, a third option of just leaving everything to him. The plan works, and from then on, all votes end with almost 100% of the voters choosing the third option. However, certain that such measures would have mankind lose their ability to decide for themselves, Rui urges Gelsadra to reconsider, but Tsubasa refuses to listen to him, and realizing that Hajime and the others agree with Rui as well, she resigns as a Gatchaman and returns her NOTE. As Tsubasa leaves with Gelsadra, Berg Katze confesses that there is nothing they can do to stop him as even he once was forced to flee instead of fighting him, much to everybody's shock. Rui then pays a visit to Rizumu asking for help, and despite refusing to cooperate, he lets slip a piece of advice for him. Meanwhile, the balloons swallowed by Gelsadra start slipping from his body, and some strange creatures appear from them before the population.
| 8 | "Cluster" | August 22, 2015 |
The population start running in fear from the creatures, calling the Gatchamen to action. But when Hajime and the others arrive, they discover that the creatures, dubbed "Kuu-sama" by the population are docile and amiable. As the society gets more used to the Kuu-samas, the Gatchamen wonder about their connection with J.J. latest warning when Berg Katze gives Hajime a riddle, claiming that it's crucial for the current situation, and after failing to obtaining some answers from the Kuu-samas, she decides to ask Gelsadra, who despite certain that such beings came from its power, not even it knows what they are, as it never saw them before, but welcomes them, as they help their efforts to unite the world's thoughts into one. Hajime then points out that she recognizes their efforts to unite mankind, but claims that it's too early for it to happen and after Berg Katze provokes Tsubasa, she takes Gelsadra and leaves in anger. Since then, the majority of the population and the Kuu-samas join forces to sway the rest of the discontented part of the population to their side, but there is still a small number who refuses to comply, much to Gelsadra's dismay. Meanwhile, Hajime claims she solved Katze's riddle and that the Kuu-samas are not actually originating from Gelsadra, which explains why they have many names according to J.J.'s prediction. Meanwhile, X also discovers the origins of the Kuu-samas but when she is about to inform Rui, it finds him too relaxed to do anything about it, thanks to the Kuu-samas' influence. Meanwhile, Joe meets an old friend of his and watches powerlessly as he is swallowed by one of the Kuu-samas.
| 9 | "Opt-out" | August 29, 2015 |
Paiman attempts to warn the population about the Kuu-samas' but is informed by O.D. that the majority of the population is approving their actions, as they only attack those who act out of accordance with their peers. Hajime then arrives and reveals that the Kuu-samas actually come from people's atmosphere, while Tsubasa confronts Gelsadra about them and has a fall-out with it. Paiman then approaches Gelsadra with intentions of arresting it because of the Kuu-samas, but the population drives it away, turning the public opinion against the Gatchamen as well. The Gatchamen then assemble at their base and conclude that the Kuu-samas are actually originating from mankind's own will instead of Gelsadra's, explaining why those who not agree with the rest of their group is attacked by them. Hajime then attempts to pay a visit to Rui, who did not appear at the meeting, and learns from X that he is under the Kuu-samas' effect, and suggests it to think of him as a friend and help him as one. Meanwhile, Joe and Sugane fights Gelsadra but it proves itself too strong for them to defeat and Sugane ends up severely wounded, while a distraught Tsubasa has an encounter with Hajime, who returns her NOTE and suggests her to pay a visit to her great-grandfather in her home. While Sugane is put under Utsutsu's care, X asks for Rizumu's help in prison, and Rizumu in return contacts Rui, bemoaning his current self. Some time later, the Gatchamen receive another forecast from J.J., and Hajime concludes from it that Gelsadra is in danger, while Rizumu obtains help from one of his associates from VAPE to escape prison, and Tsubasa returns home to visit her family.
| 10 | "Seeds" | September 12, 2015 |
Rizumu's ideal world slowly starts coming to fruition. The small opportunity presents itself, and is magnified, causing chaos to spread quickly. However, Gelsadra, who is in the middle of all of this, believes he is just doing what the people want and smiles, despite some terrible things that have occurred. Meanwhile, Tsubasa who had separated herself from the Gatchaman and Gelsadra goes back home to Nagaoka to face Yuru-jii and herself.
| 11 | "Trade-off" | September 19, 2015 |
A massive throng of Kuu-samas assemble from all across the country and swarm the town, and the Gatchamans go all-out to take them out. As the battle goes on, the number of Kuu-samas seemed endless and the Gatchaman receive more disapproval of their actions against them. During a fight, Hajime had asked Katze of a way to stop the fight, which he replied that there is no other option other than bloodshed of a single being, Gelsadra. Understanding what he meant, Hajime called the rest of Gatchaman and made a public poll, asking the people of Japan on what it is to be done of Gelsadra. The public answered by leaving it to the Gatchaman and thus, they regrouped with a plan to kill him. After a day, Gelsadra appears and the Gatchaman acts, attacking him relentlessly and without hesitation, forcing the people to rethink on their choices. Once he has been killed on screen, Tsubasa appears to tell the public of their plan on live television.
| 12 | "Insight" | September 26, 2015 |
Tsubasa on live television, told the people of Japan of their actual plan. It was revealed that Gelsadra was still alive, and that the person on screen was actually Hajime, who had disguised herself using Katze's powers to direct the people's blame towards her instead of the alien. Despite the numerous arguments and protests made by the rest of the Gatchaman, they all agreed on the plan, albeit reluctantly, and went on to excessively injure the disguised Hajime in public, and she now lies unconscious from all the damage she took from her own companions. Another poll was brought up, the same question but a different set of answers, and this time, the poll was given the deadline of a month so that the public can think deeply on their choices. After the deadline ends, Gelsadra is allowed too stay on Earth and some time later, Hajime awakens as well, much to the other Gatchamen's joy.
