= Leliko =

- Genre: Animated series, comedy, educational
- Created by: Ayşe Şule Bilgiç
- Written by: Ayşe Şule Bilgiç
- Creative director: Emre Konyalı
- Composers: Kıraç and Nevzat Yılmaz
- Country of origin: Turkey
- Original languages: Turkish; English
- No. of seasons: 1

Production
- Executive producer: Ayşe Şule Bilgiç
- Producer: H. Emre Konyalı
- Production company: Düşyeri Cartoon Film Studio

Original release
- Network: :tr Planet Çocuk
- Release: 7 October 2013 – 22 April 2017

Leliko is a Turkish 3D animation television series created by Ayşe Şule Bilgiç, who also created Pepee. It is produced by Düşyeri Cartoon Film Studio (Düşyeri Çizgi Film Stüdyosu). The series premiered on the children's television channel Planet Çocuk (:tr) on 7 October 2013.

== Characters ==
- Leli (voiced by Ece Sefertaş)
- Liko (voiced by Başar Şahinyılmaz)
- Kulabuz (voiced by Yağız Alp Şimşek)

== Production ==
The series features songs and musical numbers produced by Kıraç and Nevzat Yılmaz.
