= List of Miss Monochrome episodes =

Miss Monochrome: The Animation is an anime television series by Liden Films based on the character created and voiced by Yui Horie. The series follows the eponymous android Miss Monochrome, who seeks to become a famous idol. The first series aired on TV Tokyo between October 1 and December 24, 2013. Additionally, it was released by Niconico Channel, Bandai Channel, AT-X in Japan and was simulcast by Crunchyroll. An English dub version was released on Crunchyroll on July 21, 2015. The theme song is "Pokerface" (ポーカーフェイス, Pōkāfeisu) by Miss Monochrome (Yui Horie), which was released on January 29, 2014. A second season aired between July 3, 2015, and September 25, 2015. A third season began airing from October 2, 2015. For both seasons, the opening and ending themes respectively are "Black or White?" and "Step by Step", both performed by Miss Monochrome. From episode 10 of season 3 onwards, the respective opening and ending themes are "Miss Monochrome Taisō" (ミス・モノクローム体操, Miss Monochrome Exercise) and "Kimi to Boku" (キミとボク, You and I) by Miss Monochrome.

== Episode list ==
=== Miss Monochrome: The Animation (2013) ===
No.	Title	Original release date
1	"Fall"	October 1, 2013
Miss Monochrome is an android who aspires to stand out like popular idol Kikuko. She asks her caretaker, Mana, to be her manager, only to get conned out of her 19.3 billion yen fortune and wind up homeless. Miss Monochrome soon runs into a man named Maneo, who she makes as her manager not knowing that he is the manager of a convenience store.
2	"Heaven"	October 8, 2013
Miss Monochrome wakes up after spending the night practicing her autograph. Rū-chan breaks down after sucking in too many papers and Monochrome buries it in the yard outside the apartment.
3	"Vengeance"	October 15, 2013
As Aliens invade Earth on a human hunt, Miss Monochrome is given a golden Evoluta battery as a reward for her work and upon returning to her apartment, the battery overcharges her circuits, combining herself with Rū-chan to destroy the aliens and she later awakens with no memory of what happened.
4	"Metamorphose"	October 22, 2013
Miss Monochromes sees a Nendoroid of Kikuko as a sign of popularity and makes one of herself. The Nendoroid becomes a huge success and gets mass-produced, although it does not help improve Miss Monochrome's own popularity at all.
5	"Halloween"	October 29, 2013
Miss Monochrome gets an opportunity to appear in cosplay on a Halloween-themed children's television special. However, she ends up dressing in a costume designed to scare the children and her entire presence is edited out of the final broadcast.
6	"Job"	November 5, 2013
After thinking what job to do, Miss Monochrome gets a job as a soap opera extra. Later, she appears in a surprise Wake Up idol show, only to wind up scaring the producers instead.
7	"Props"	November 12, 2013
Seeing Kikuko with a wand on TV, Miss Monochrome asks Maneo for a prop of her own.
8	"Winner"	November 19, 2013
Miss Monochrome gets a job as a race queen, entering the race herself and winning, before climbing various mountains in the hopes of standing out more.
9	"Rival"	November 26, 2013
Miss Monochrome her centuries-old meeting with the Kikuko of her past, waiting several years for her reincarnation.
10	"Fighter"	December 3, 2013
Miss Monochrome starts her own hand-shaking event, which soon sets her off on a prosperous wrestling career.
11	"Audition"	December 10, 2013
Miss Monochrome auditions for a gourmet reporter, then a chef, then tries something else.
12	"Idol"	December 17, 2013
Miss Monochrome finally gets to meet Kikuko, who has a deja vu with her past life and makes a promise with her to both do their best.
13	"Monochrome"	December 24, 2013
Sometime around the Christmas Eve, a mysterious man helped Miss Monochrome in her CD debut as she later performs in a public crowd on Christmas day, and makes her first fan. In the end, unknown to everyone, that mysterious man turned out to be Santa Claus.
OVA	"Supporter"	March 26, 2014
Miss Monochrome makes a promotional video to support Japan in the 2014 World Cup.
OVA–2	"Manager"	September 24, 2014
Miss Monochrome becomes Kikuko's manager for the day.

=== Miss Monochrome: The Animation 2 (2015) ===
No.	Title	Original release date
1	"Ignition"	July 3, 2015
Miss Monochrome decides what she needs to become a super idol is to make her first album and go on tour. What she and Maneo actually end up doing is creating a photo album which they tour across the country.
2	"Promoter"	July 10, 2015
Miss Monochrome searches for a promoter for her concert, managing to find a "pro motorer" named Yayoi, who turns out to be an employee of a small record label.
3	"Guitarist"	July 17, 2015
After Yayoi gets a little over excited in fulfilling Miss Monochrome's requests, they recruit fellow convenience store employee Akiko as her guitarist.
4	"Goods"	July 24, 2015
Miss Monochrome and the others think of ideas for goods to sell at her concerts.
5	"Scout"	July 31, 2015
As the group plan out the schedule for Miss Monochrome's concert, Akiko gets scouted and becomes an international superstar, with Ru replacing her as the entire band.
6	"Showdown"	August 7, 2015
Miss Monochrome teaches the newbie idol group Caramel how to act like mannequins during a drama shoot, eventually hiring them to be her backup dancers.
7	"Again"	August 14, 2015
Miss Monochrome, along with Caramel, once again appears on the Wake Up, Surprise show, where they provide their own shocking surprise.
8	"Requiem"	August 21, 2015
After a leaky roof shorts out her battery compartment, Miss Monochrome ends up going on an adventure with an anthropomorphic battery.
9	"Publicity"	August 28, 2015
While coming up with inspiration for publicity photos, Miss Monochrome comes across Kikuko and Mana, who suggest she change up her image.
10	"Seventeen"	September 4, 2015
Miss Monochrome decides to investigate Kikuko to see what makes her different from her.
11	"Innerspace"	September 11, 2015
Miss Monochrome starts experiencing errors after Yayoi inadvertently pulls out a cable during an installation, so she and Ru venture inside Miss Monochrome's circuits in order to repair the corrupted data.
12	"Crisis4696"	September 18, 2015
Yayoi accidentally orders more Miss Monochrome merchandise than her company can afford, putting the company, and Miss Monochrome's album and concert, in danger of going bankrupt.
13	"Monochrome^{2}"	September 25, 2015
Mana and Akiko buy all of Miss Monochrome's merchandise, paying off the company's debt and allowing Miss Monochrome's debut to go ahead as planned.

=== Miss Monochrome: The Animation 3 (2015) ===
No.	Title	Original release date
1	"Diskjockey"	October 2, 2015
While praying for the success of her new album, Miss Monochrome decides she needs a DJ for her tour, finding a gas attendant to be perfect for the job.
2	"Exercise"	October 9, 2015
Miss Monochrome searches for all sorts of ways to increase her visibility.
3	"Mister"	October 16, 2015
Miss Monochrome puts her battery in backwards, transforming her into the shy and introverted male android, Mister Monochrome.
4	"Appeal"	October 23, 2015
With her mascot outfit out for cleaning, Miss Monochrome makes a new one out of cardboard for a mascot contest.
5	"Girlfriend"	October 30, 2015
Obtaining the chance to do a cross-promotion for a certain video game, Miss Monochrome searches for inspiration for a Christmas song.
6	"Fisherman"	November 6, 2015
While the staff relax at a hot spring resort, Miss Monochrome encounters a fisherman named Magurou.
7	"Disguise"	November 13, 2015
Following her concert in Osaka, Miss Monochrome invites Kikuko to go sightseeing with her disguised as her Nendoroid.
8	"Project"	November 20, 2015
Miss Monochrome takes care of an abandoned kitten named Catora, who takes her to her world as gratitude.
9	"Unity"	November 27, 2015
Miss Monochrome becomes overly strict with Caramel in order to have them strive to perfection, though they don't seem to get the latter part and become upset.
10	"Radio"	December 4, 2015
After missing the bullet train for a music program, Miss Monochrome becomes determined to make it to the gig through alternate means.
11	"A"	December 11, 2015
Fearing her routines have become predictable, Miss Monochrome tries to come up with something that would surprise her audience.
12	"Distress"	December 18, 2015
Miss Monochrome is in Sapporo, where a fan discovers that his fiancee is trapped in the mountains. Luckily, Monochrome can't abandon a fan who needs help.
13	"Monochrome^{3}"	December 25, 2015
Monochrome finally obtains the success she dream of and celebrate Christmas with her friends.
