= List of Diabolik Lovers episodes =

Diabolik Lovers is a Japanese anime series based on the video game of the same name. An anime adaptation was first announced at a 2013 event called the "Rejet Fes 2013 Viva La Revolution". During the "Otomate Party 2013" event later that year, it was announced that the adaptation would be directed by Atsushi Matsumoto and produced by the Zexcs studio. It aired on AT-X along with online streaming on Niconico between September 16 and December 9, 2013. Crunchyroll also picked the adaptation up for streaming in territories including the United States and Canada. It was subsequently licensed by Sentai Filmworks and was released with an English dub and subtitles by the company on a 2-disc DVD volume set on December 2, 2014. The opening theme is "Mr.SADISTIC NIGHT" by Hikaru Midorikawa and Kōsuke Toriumi while the ending theme is "Nightmare" by Yuki Hayashi. The second opening is "Kindan no 666" by Ryōhei Kimura and Daisuke Kishio. The DVD contained several mini dramas depicting events that occurred to the Sakamaki's off-screen during the anime. An OVA episode was bundled together with the Diabolik Lovers: Dark Fate game and released on February 28, 2015. The Blu-ray edition of the series was released in 2015.

A second anime adaptation titled Diabolik Lovers More, Blood was directed by Risako Yoshida and written by Hiroko Kusanagi with a returning voice cast. The series comprised 12 episodes and aired from September 23 to December 3, 2015. The Blu-ray DVD edition of the second series was released on January 4, 2017, and the Diabolik Lovers II: More, Blood Complete Collection was released on DVD and Blu-ray on March 28, 2017. The second season was also licensed by Sentai Filmworks and received an English dub in March 2017.

== Episode list ==
=== Diabolik Lovers (2013) ===
No.	Title	Original release date
1	"Episode 1"	September 16, 2013
Yui arrives in the mysterious house and meets the six brothers who are actually vampires, but none of them knew about her arrival except Shu, who explains that he received a call the other day from a man, and he told him to keep her safe and not to kill her. Soon, Yui learns that she is the prospective bride, and she tries to run, but ends up in an abandoned room, where she finds her father's diary and discovers that she is adopted. The episode ends with Yui yelling for help as she was cornered by the six brothers.
2	"Episode 2"	September 23, 2013
It is the first day at a new high school for Yui, but she finds it strange that the high school is at night. On their way to school, she notices that all the brothers are different from each other and don't seem to get along. Later at school, Ayato forces himself on Yui and sucks her blood and does not stop until Reiji comes and tells him to take his activities to his private room. Later, Ayato throws Yui in the swimming pool and orders her to say that he is great, but Yui can't swim and begs for help. Ayato then has a flashback of his childhood, and after that, he jumps in the pool to save Yui. He kisses Yui underwater to wake her up and suck her blood, but Yui begs him to stop, and he stops, while telling her he will continue later. At the end of the episode, Yui goes back to the abandoned room to see her dad's diary but finds it blank and is confused.
3	"Episode 3"	September 30, 2013
Yui has dinner with the brothers and when she returns to her room, Ayato is waiting here to suck her blood. Later, she eventually learns that the brothers are different from each other, since they all have different mothers: Shu and Reiji have the same mother, Ayato, Kanato and Laito are triplets from another mother, and Subaru has a different mother. After Yui grabs Shu's hand, an old memory comes into his head. When Shu sees that he held Yui's hand tight, he drags her to the tub and says he wants to suck her blood (possibly to make her hate him so she's not too attached to him). Yui is shocked to think he was different, but he tells her he's a vampire. Later that night, Ayato also tries to suck Yui's blood, but is annoyed to find bite marks on her neck. Ayato challenges Shu to play darts with Yui as the prize. Shu wins the match and is about to leave, Laito pushes Yui towards him.
4	"Episode 4"	October 7, 2013
Yui tries once again in vain to try to contact her father, but is stopped by Kanato, who later decides to hide her backpack on the roof of the school as "punishment" for not bringing him the accommodations that he had asked for. As Yui goes to retrieve her belongings, she stumbles upon Laito, who seems to be citing strange words to the moon. Laito catches her so he sucks Yui's blood and realized something strange about her blood. Yui later tried to call her father but no use, before fainting on Laito. Later on, Yui wakes up unconsciously and go to the church to pray for help but got trapped with Laito. Laito begins harassing her for his own enjoyment. For he has her all to himself. Later that night, Laito begins sucking on Yui's blood and doesn't let go until the night is over.
5	"Episode 5"	October 14, 2013
Kanato finds Yui in the rose garden, as she tries to sort out the new information about who betrayed her and gave her up as a sacrifice from Laito. He beckons her to follow him, so he may show off a graveyard containing the grave of his mother. Assuming he would like some time alone, Yui attempts to leave, which only infuriates Kanato with misplaced anger. Reeling from this experience, Yui wanders through the estate and becomes worried when she hears groans coming from Reiji's room. Much to her folly, she enters the room to see if he needs help. After Yui wakes him up, Reiji wakes up to the smell of Yui's blood. After that, he makes tea for Yui that was given to her for his own research of different herbs and medicines. After tasting it, Yui drops and breaks the cup. Later on, Reiji makes Yui his guinea pig to test the medicine he was working on. Yui collapses on the ground from the awful taste and cuts her hand from the broken teacup that fell along with her before. Reiji, being utterly annoyed at her, became interested in the smell of her blood once again and had forgotten about the mess she had made for him in his room. Being tempted from the smell of Yui's blood, Reiji orders Yui to stand up from the distance. Then, he forces himself on Yui and drinks her blood. As he drinks her blood, it only beckons his approval of her to stay a little longer. After finishing Yui's blood, Reiji has a flashback of his late mother, Beatrix, before he killed her.
6	"Episode 6"	October 21, 2013
Yui refuses to accept that she should suddenly stop showing compassion towards the brothers merely because they are vampires and allows herself to be led to one of Kanato's most favorite places in his little world. As she views his family's collection of wax figures all in bridal wear, she finds herself eerily aware that things are not as benign as they appear. Kanato confirms her suspicions and gleefully sets to adding her to their collection until he is interrupted by a summons. He later sucked Yui's blood before Ayato appeared and stop the scene. She later runs into Subaru, who encourages her to escape while she still has the chance. But she decided to stay in order to find out the answer for her problem, Subaru then leaving and giving her his silver knife to protect herself. Yui returned to her room and Laito waiting here as he wanted to suck her blood. Yui begins to defend herself, which cause Laito now feeling more interested in her.
6.5	"Episode 6.5"	October 28, 2013
Recap of the previous episodes from Yui's point of view.
7	"Episode 7"	November 4, 2013
Yui is awakened by the sound of rain and looking from her window, she sees a mysterious woman in a purple dress. She becomes controlled by an unknown force and goes all the way to a secret tunnel and through a door that leads to the past. There she sees the brothers as children. But after she discovers the truth of their past, she reappears in the tunnel and is found by a concerned Ayato, who instructs her not to return down there, especially during the rain. But suddenly Laito appear and both of them begin to suck Yui's blood. Ayato now realized something strange about her blood and begin to think about that.
8	"Episode 8"	November 11, 2013
Yui asks the triplets about the woman in the purple dress who she spotted in the garden and learns the gruesome truth about what befell their mother, Cordelia. Yui runs out of the house in horror after knowing how the triplet killed their mother and collapses sobbing in the garden, only to be approached by Subaru, who later suck her blood and demands she keep her distance from him, or else. Yui spends a sleepless night in her chamber, made less restful by the arrival of an unwanted guest. But suddenly surprised to see Ayato climb into the chamber and hug her to sleep.
9	"Episode 9"	November 18, 2013
Yui experiences more chest pains and leaves the mansion in the middle of the night to seek answers and finds Shu in an abandoned church. At first, he is unhelpful but quickly becomes interested in obliging her request for answers by forcibly tasting her blood to verify that it has indeed changed somehow. Richter then appears and takes Yui to the secret room where 'Cordelia' awakens and everyone feels it especially Ayato who goes to find her, to end up finding Yui's rosary on her bed.
10	"Episode 10"	November 25, 2013
Cordelia and Richter savor one another's company for the first time in ages, since Richter removed her heart before she died and placed it on Yui. Ayato interrupts, demanding to know what they have done to Yui. He then drags Cordelia away and throw her into the lake, which causes Yui to regain control of her body. Ayato saves her and begins to suck her blood, while ordering her to belong to him and only him. Kanato & Laito suddenly interrupt which causes Yui to panic and run back to the mansion. Subaru appears to warn that she should have escaped earlier and then sucks her blood. Later, Yui expressionless walks in front of Cordelia and she takes over Yui's body completely.
11	"Episode 11"	December 2, 2013
While Cordelia and Richter catch up, Reiji appears, and Cordelia begins to tease him in a seductive way. He then rejects her, and Laito, Kanato, Subaru, and Shu all appear due to the commotion. As they discuss the situation, she gives a knife to Richter so he can "dispose" of all the boys for her. Richter does not follow suit, as it is revealed that he had been using Cordelia to further his plan of becoming head, much to her chagrin. Going after her heart, Ayato appears and tells the two to end the bickering, and that Yui belongs to him. As he and Richter duel in attempt to win Yui, Ayato is stabbed. Just then, Yui regains control of her body, and calls for Ayato. She then stabs herself in the heart in order to save everyone. Richter attempts to take Yui's heart but is stabbed by Ayato. At that moment, Cordelia takes over Yui's body once more as Yui is slowly fading away.
12	"Episode 12"	December 9, 2013
Returning from when Yui stabbed herself, Subaru takes out the silver knife. Richter then struggles to the attic, where he has hidden Cordelia's dress; however, Laito finds him. Meanwhile, Shu, Subaru, Kanato, and Ayato are watching over Yui, and the awakening takes place. Reiji makes a potion to kill Cordelia as fast as he could while she's in Yui's body, but in order to make the potion complete, he must have a piece of Cordelia. Kanato pulls Teddy apart to reveal a vial containing Cordelia's ashes, and this makes the potion complete. Switching back to the attic, Laito sets fire to the dress and Richter, which then the fire kills him. Ayato then drinks the potion only to feed it to Yui through a kiss and calling her actual name. Yui then awakens, and notices all the brothers are with her. After the credits end, we see all the brothers talking to Yui, one-by-one. Resuming the episode, we see Yui on the balcony holding a rose. Ayato then walks up to her and returns her cross necklace. We then see the rose falling and the petals falling off and chains locking Cordelia in the attic.
—	"OVA"	February 28, 2015
The four Mukami brothers infiltrate the Sakamaki mansion in search of Yui much to the annoyance of the six Sakamaki brothers.

=== Diabolik Lovers More, Blood (2015) ===
No. overall	No. in season	Title	Original release date
13	1	"Episode 13"	September 23, 2015
At somewhere else, there are two people talking about "the time" is almost coming. After living with the Sakamaki's for a month, Yui starts to have strange dreams and apparitions regarding a mysterious "Eve". One night, she wakes up to see the triplet climb on her bed and tried to suck her blood, but soon got saved by Reiji. On their way to school, the brothers and Yui get involved in an unexplainable fiery car crash. The next morning, Yui finds herself unable to sleep after the events from yesterday. She takes a stroll in the garden until a voice calls out to her, addressing her as "Eve". Yui is then greeted by Kou, Yuma and Azusa Mukami. She runs from them until she is cornered by Ruki Mukami who tells her that they have come for her. The Mukami's grab her, and she is knocked unconscious by Ruki.
14	2	"Episode 14"	September 30, 2015
Yui wakes up to find herself in the Mukami's mansion and the Mukami brothers introduce themselves. They tell her that she will be living with them from now on, because her - "Eve's" - blood will seek out an "Adam" amongst them. The Sakamaki's on the other hand, ponder over her sudden disappearance, however they hope that she will eventually return. Meanwhile, Ruki sucks Yui's blood in his room after chasing her down when she tries to escape. A mysterious bat observes this from the window.
15	3	"Episode 15"	October 7, 2015
Yui begins to notice how different the Mukami's are from the Sakamaki's, as their relationship is closer than the other. The Mukami's go to school, however they won't let Yui go because the Sakamaki's also go there. They leave Azusa in the mansion to monitor Yui for the day. Azusa invites Yui to his room to show off his knife collection, but things get challenging for Yui when Azusa requests for her to let him cut her with one of his knives. Yui refuses, so he puts his knife in her hand and makes her cut him instead. Yui panics after cutting Azusa and tries to get help, only to end up getting cornered by him.
16	4	"Episode 16"	October 14, 2015
Yuma interrupts Yui while she is having a bath and he drags her out to help him in his garden. While harvesting, Yui learns something new from Yuma: The Mukami's were originally humans... Later, Yuma tell her a bit about his painful childhood, before sucking her blood. Later, Yui wakes up in Yuma's bedroom and he try to feed her with a sugar cube.
17	5	"Episode 17"	October 21, 2015
Kou gives Yui a bouquet of roses as a token of acquaintance. This makes her happy until he requests her to return the 'favor'. He wants something back from her, which is none other than her blood. Yui pushes Kou away when he gets too close to her, prompting him to reveal that he is not the person whom she thought he was... Kou begin smashing the roses and push her on the ground to suck her blood. Later, Yui learns that Kou is also an idol and he tell her a story about his traumatic childhood, before forced her to sleep with him tonight. At night, Kou begin to have nightmares and hug Yui for comfort. At the same time, the Mukami began to concern why "Eve" hasn't been awaken and Ruki concern that his brothers have forgot the "promise".
18	6	"Episode 18"	October 28, 2015
The Mukami's allow Yui to go back to school. There, she bumps into Reiji, Laito and Kanato who each insert their comments on how she left them for the Mukami's. Yui is later on confronted by Subaru who drags her to the school roof where he demands some answers from her. He asks Yui if she really chose to be with the Mukami's, only for their conversation to be cut short when Kou interferes. Kou & Subaru are fighting over Yui that they both bite her neck. At the end, Yui chooses to stay with the Mukami.
19	7	"Episode 19"	November 4, 2015
Yuma is curious about Shu, and he asks Yui what she knows about him. They later make a surprise encounter with him at school. Yuma mocking Shu and even suck Yui's blood in front of him to say that Yui is now with him. When they leave, Shu is having a flashback about his childhood friend Edgar and unsure is that Yuma, while Reiji, who is standing far away from them, notice something strange about Yuma. Elsewhere, Ruki is beginning to become aware that he and his brothers may not be able to become "Adam" after all... and immediately notice that Ayato is in front of the Mukami's house.
20	8	"Episode 20"	November 11, 2015
Due to his realization that he and his brothers may not be able to become "Adam", Ruki begins to act strangely to the extent where he confines Yui in a small room to forcefully suck her blood. But then he calms down and remembering when the Mukami were on the verge of death as a kid, a man appeared and save their life to fulfill the "promise" from him. As this happens, his brothers grow concerned for him and Yui as she becomes weaker. Ayato takes action abducting Yui to which Ruki offers no resistance much to the confusion of his brothers.
21	9	"Episode 21"	November 18, 2015
Ayato takes Yui back to the Sakamaki household. Waking up in her room, she is greeted by Laito who forcefully drinks her blood. Afterwards, Reiji gathers everyone into the living room to warn them about the upcoming lunar eclipse, and to ask Yui what she knows of the Mukami brothers. Believing Reiji may know something about the "Adam and Eve" plan, she later visits him in his study to inquire about it. However, Reiji only tells her that it is something she doesn't need to know before pushing her down and sucking her blood. At that time, a pack of wolves appearing and about to attack.
22	10	"Episode 22"	November 25, 2015
At the garden, Yui got blood sucked by Shu for running away from the brothers. Meanwhile, Ruki remains distressed over the fact that he and his brothers are incapable of becoming "Adam", but things take a turn for the worse when the Mukami's are suddenly attacked by a pack of wolves. Meanwhile, Kanato is mad with Yui for leaving to the Mukami's place and begin sucks her blood. Until Azusa appears to ask Yui for help, Kanato is enraged that Yui want to leave and try to suffocate her. Azusa immediately walk to Kanato's Teddy bear and throw him on fire. Then he took Yui away while Kanato is screaming as he watched Teddy got burned up.
23	11	"Episode 23"	December 2, 2015
The Mukami Family are gathered around an unconscious Ruki, Azusa blaming himself for the injuries. The "Apple of Adam Plan" is also explained to Yui. At night, Yui and Ruki are talking about the plan alone and his belief it is impossible. Yui then encouraged Ruki that her and his brothers are all worry about him. Ruki then hugged her and ask Yui will she be his "Eve". Meanwhile, the two people from the beginning episode is now on action to find something as the full moon turning red, which means "the time" has come.
24	12	"Episode 24"	December 9, 2015
The Sakamaki's are attacked by the same pack of wolves who attacked the Mukami's. After that, they realized that those wolves are from the founders of the vampires, which include 2 people, and they are looking for Yui's blood. This prompts Ayato to pursue Yui to the Mukami household and take her away, but Ruki stop him and suggest that they should make an alliance to protect Yui from the founders. But the fact Yui belong to who which cause Ayato & Ruki both suck Yui's blood to say that she belongs to them. Resuming the episode, Ruki came to Yui and tell her to make a decision and choose her "Adam", as Yui and the Mukami brothers looking at the red moon.
