= List of Kyousougiga episodes =

Kyousougiga is an original net animation created by Izumi Todo and produced by Toei Animation in collaboration with Banpresto. The original ONA was released on YouTube and other sites on December 6, 2011. Five additional ONA episodes were streamed between August 31, 2012, and December 22, 2012. A 13-episode television series (including two summary and one special episode) began airing from October 2, 2013. The opening theme is "Koko" (ココ) by Tamurapan whilst the ending theme is "Shissō Ginga" (疾走銀河, Sprint Galaxy) by Teppan.

== Episode list ==
=== ONA series ===
No.	Title	Directed by	Written by	Original air date
0	"Kyousougiga"; Transliteration: "Kyōsōgiga" (Japanese: 京騒戯画)	Rie Matsumoto	Miho Maruo	December 6, 2011
A girl named Koto and her brothers wind up in a mirrored version of Kyoto, where they face many strange occurrences.
1	"Thus Spake the Protagonist, Koto."; Transliteration: "Koto, Shujinkō Kaku Katariki" (Japanese: コト、主人公かく語りき)	Directed by : Rie Matsumoto; Storyboarded by : Rie Matsumoto; Yukio Kaizawa	Michiyo Yamamoto	August 31, 2012
Koto recalls the teachings of her teacher, Inari.
2	"The Flustered Scientist, Shouko"; Transliteration: "Shōko, Kagakusha Awatekyūsu" (Japanese: ショーコ、科学者慌て窮す)	Hiroshi Kobayashi	Kuraku Asagi	October 27, 2012
Scientist Shouko searches frantically across Kyoto for her remote control device.
3	"Yase's Monster News for the Looking Glass City"; Transliteration: "Yase, Yōkai Kyōto Tsūshin" (Japanese: 八瀬、妖怪鏡都通信)	Yukio Kaizawa	Rika Nakase	November 10, 2012
As Yase has one of her lackies shoot a television program following a yearly event in which unneeded objects mysteriously float away, Koto and co try to stop a young girl from being taken away with them.
4	"Thus Spake the Monk, Myōe"; Transliteration: "Myōe, Bōzu Kaku Katariki" (Japanese: 明恵、坊主かく語りき)	Directed by : Kohei Hatano; Storyboarded by : Rie Matsumoto	Kuraku Asagi	December 8, 2012
The episode focuses on the buddhist, Myōe.
5	"Reminiscence of the Black Rabbit, Koto"; Transliteration: "Koto, Kuro Usagi Kaisōroku" (Japanese: 古都、黒兎回想録)	Rie Matsumoto	Kuraku Asagi	December 22, 2012
The episode focuses on how Lady Koto and the original Myoe first met.

=== TV series ===
There are 10 main episodes and 3 extras (episodes 0, 5.5 and 10.5)

No.	Title	Directed by	Written by	Original release date
0	"Introductory Chapter"; Transliteration: "Yoshū-hen" (Japanese: 予習篇)	Rie Matsumoto	Miho Maruo	October 2, 2013
A re-airing of the original ONA with some cuts and a new soundtrack.
1	"A Family's Circumstances and its Background"; Transliteration: "Aru Ikka no Jijō to Sono Haikei" (Japanese: ある一家の事情とその背景)	Directed by : Rie Matsumoto; Morio Hatano; Storyboarded by : Rie Matsumoto	Izumi Todo; Kuraku Asagi	October 9, 2013
A look at Myoe's past. Lady Koto, who was originally a black rabbit given life by Myoe's drawings, was given a body by a bodhisattva so she could express her love. They soon bonded and started a family consisting of three children; Yakushimaru, a human child, and Kurama and Yase, who were created from drawings. When the capital started to complain about them, they decided to live in the Mirror Kyoto that Myoe created, where humans and creatures could live together in peace and broken things simply regenerate. However, Lady Koto started having terrifying visions, which she believed would be brought about by keeping the bodhisattva's body, thus she and Myoe left their children behind in Mirror Kyoto. Back in the present, it is revealed that the current Myoe is actually a grown up Yakushimaru, taking his role as head monk. One day, a mysterious lightning storm appears, followed by a light falling into a shrine in the center of the city. As Yakushimaru arrives there, he meets Koto and her brothers, who had wound up in Mirror Kyoto whilst looking for her guardian.
2	"What Came Was a Little Sister"; Transliteration: "Yatte Kita no wa Imōto" (Japanese: やってきたのは妹)	Directed by : Yukihiko Nakao; Storyboarded by : Rie Matsumoto	Michiyo Yamamoto; Miho Maruo; Izumi Todo	October 16, 2013
Koto recalls her past training with her master and father, Inari, a shrine priest who often goes on missions. Late one night, Koto spots a black rabbit in her home and chases after it, coming across a room where she finds the paintings of the Mirror Capital and Lady Koto in her rabbit form, and Inari crying in his sleep while calling out to Lady Koto, deciding to keep it a secret. Back in the present, Yakushimaru, Yase and Kurama discuss the possible link between Koto and Lady Koto.
3	"The Eldest and his Happy Science Team"; Transliteration: "Chōnan to Yukai de Kagaku na Nakama" (Japanese: 長男と愉快で科学な仲間)	Hiroyuki Kakudō	Kuraku Asagi	October 23, 2013
Koto visits Shouko's lab, letting her analyse her hammer whilst she meets up with Kurama, who recalls his childhood. Meanwhile, Shouko freaks out when she loses a handheld controller for her giant robot. Her men chase after one being carried by a crow, only to find it isn't hers. She later manages to find it at a restaurant, thanks to her assistant, Yashimi, secretly putting a GPS tracker on it.
4	"The Second Daughter and her Wonderful Monsters"; Transliteration: "Jijo to Suteki na Yōkai-tachi" (Japanese: 次女と素敵な妖怪達)	Yukio Kaizawa	Rika Nakase	October 30, 2013
It becomes the time of the year where the station opens and people send their unwanted things to float away. Later that night, a mischievous imp throws away all of Yase's crockery, sending her into a monstrous rage. After learning about the situation the next day, Koto, A, and Un search the station for Yase's favorite cup. During this time, Koto hears from Yase's butler how she once had her favorite doll thrown away because her brothers believed it could bring Lady Koto back. After failing to find Yase's cup after a day of searching, Koto tries to obtain Kurama's cup as a replacement, but this does not please Yase. She turns into a monster out of rage, but Koto manages to stop her. Seeing some of her mother in Koto, Yase gives her thanks for everyone's efforts and accepts the cup.
5	"The Worries, Beginning, and Ending of the Young Third Son"; Transliteration: "Wakaki Sannan no Nayami to Hajimari to Owari" (Japanese: 若き三男の悩みと始まりと終わり)	Directed by : Junji Shimizu; Storyboarded by : Junji Shimizu; Rie Matsumoto	Michiyo Yamamoto; Kuraku Asagi	November 6, 2013
Yakushimaru feels pent up over his past, even having an outburst at Koto. After getting some advice from Yakushimaru's girlfriend, Koto goes on a moped trip with him, explaining how A and Un are like the beginning and the end, reminding Yakushimaru of the words Myoe left him with. He then tells him that the black rabbit she is chasing is most likely his mother, offering to help her find it on the condition that once she does, she would kill him.
5.5	"Kyōto Live Action Edition"; Transliteration: "Kyōto Jitsuroku-hen" (Japanese: 京都実録篇)	Unknown	Unknown	November 13, 2013
A special live action episode in which voice actresses Ryouko Shiraishi and Erika Nakayama tour the real life Kyōto to see how it influenced the anime.
6	"A Story Where Two Plan and One Worries"; Transliteration: "Futari ga Keikakushi Hitori ga Nayamu Hanashi" (Japanese: 二人が計画し一人が悩む話)	Directed by : Morio Hatano; Storyboarded by : Junji Shimizu; Saburo Morita; Rie Matsumoto	Miho Maruo; Michiyo Yamamoto; Izumi Todo	November 20, 2013
Yakushimaru explains to Koto how Myoe had found him after he had attempted to take his own life following the death of his parents and decided to adopt him, using a special fruit to bring him back to life and make him immortal. Whilst initially hating being unable to die, Yakushimaru soon became attached to his adoptive parents, making it all the more sad when he became separated from them. After Koto and Yakushimaru talk about their respective parents, Yase and Kurama, who are curious about the identity of Koto, bring her to their assembly, much to Yakushimaru's objection. As Yakushimaru fights against Yase, Koto gets swallowed by Kurama's robot, which leads her to a gate that takes her to the moon, where she comes face to face with Lady Koto, who she identifies as her mother.
7	"Mom's Back, and Oh, Dad's Back, Too"; Transliteration: "Haha ga Kikan shite Tsuideni Chichi mo Kikan shita" (Japanese: 母が帰還してついでに父も帰還した)	Directed by : Yu Kamatani; Storyboarded by : Rie Matsumoto	Rika Nakase; Miho Maruo	November 27, 2013
After reuniting as mother and daughter, Koto and Lady Koto return to Kyoto and reunite with the others. Lady Koto is then given a tour of Kyoto to see how everyone has done over the years. Afterwards, however, Lady Koto states she needs to return to where she was, although no one is sure how. Later that night, Lady Koto and Koto have a talk, with Lady Koto asking Koto to help rescue her father who is trapped in a dream. Afterwards, Koto comes to Yakushimaru's room, venting her frustration that she knows next to nothing about herself. Just then, Inari appears before Koto, revealing himself to be the true Myoe, whilst various destructive phenomena begin to occur around Kyoto.
8	"Troublesome Talks Here and There"; Transliteration: "Atchi de Kotchi de Momeru Hanashi" (Japanese: あっちでこっちでもめる話)	Directed by : Naoyuki Itō; Storyboarded by : Yukio Kaizawa	Michiyo Yamamoto; Rika Nakase; Izumi Todo	December 4, 2013
Koto blames herself for the destruction arising in Kyoto, believing it to be caused by her using her hammer. Meanwhile, as Lady Koto tries to get Inari to explain the cause of the destruction, which is also affecting Yase's memories, the head priest of Shrine appears. He reveals Kyoto was a forbidden thirteenth parallel created by Inari in secret, and that both Inari starting up a family and Koto forcing her way into the world has begun a chain reaction that will destroy all other parallels. As Inari stands against the head priest, fighting off familiars being controlled by his assistant, the head priest reveals Koto had inherited all of the abilities from Lady Koto, who allegedly cannot exist outside of the sanctuary, as she starts disappearing. This leads Koto to blame herself even further, but Yakushimaru manages to bring her back to her senses, encouraging her to stand up to the head priest and protect Kyoto.
9	"Let's All Think about What We Can Do"; Transliteration: "Dōshitara Ii ka Minna Kangaeyō" (Japanese: どうしたらいいかみんな考えよう)	Junji Shimizu	Michiyo Yamamoto; Rika Nakase; Izumi Todo	December 11, 2013
Koto firmly states her case over why Kyoto should continue existing. Inari then reveals he is a god, who created the universe alongside his brother, the head priest, and his father. Saying that he wanted Koto to grow up to be someone he can live on through, Inari suddenly stabs both Koto and the priest with his sword, putting Koto under his control as she starts destroying Kyoto, causing harsher effects on the other parallels. As Yakushimaru, Kurama, and Shouko find themselves trapped under some rubble, Kurama urges Yakushimaru to start living for himself, before he and Shouko are eventually rescued and go their separate ways. After coming across Yase, who praises how he always thought of Kyoto, Yakushimaru rushes to Koto's side and brings her back to her senses with the beads of creation he got from Inari, which he believes can save Kyoto.
10	"A Manga Movie About People Who Have a Fun, Busy Life!"; Transliteration: "Kyō o Sawagashiku Tawamure Ikiru Hitobito no Manga Eiga" (Japanese: 今日を騒がしく戯れ生きる人々の漫画映画)	Rie Matsumoto	Michiyo Yamamoto; Rika Nakase; Izumi Todo	December 18, 2013
As Lady Koto and Inari talk things out between themselves, where he states his wish to disappear and pass on his duty to Koto. Koto and Yakushimaru manage to use the power of their hammer and beads to repair the damage done to Kyoto and the parallels, arriving on the central plane, Takamakahara. There, they meet their grandfather, who tells Koto and Yakushimaru to take Inari's place as the new God of the world. Wanting to question Inari herself, Koto and Yakushimaru break their way onto the moon, where Koto uses her fists to let out her feelings to Inari, convincing him to stay. As such, Koto's grandfather allows Inari's existence to remain whilst Yakushimaru takes over his role as priest, and Koto's family is fully reunited.
10.5	"Review"; Transliteration: "Fukushū-hen" (Japanese: 復習篇)	Unknown	Unknown	December 25, 2013
An overview of the series with commentary.
