= List of Yowamushi Pedal episodes =

The Yowamushi Pedal anime series premiered on October 7, 2013. Episodes are simulcast with English, Spanish, and Portuguese subs on Crunchyroll under the series name Yowapeda to people in the United States, Canada, the Caribbean, South Africa, and Central and South America. Season one covers how Onoda Sakamichi gets involved in the sport of bicycle racing and how he participates during his first year of high school in the Inter-High race. Season one lasts 38 episodes and there are a total of 137 episodes summing all five seasons.

== Music ==
Opening themes

- OP 01 : "Reclimb" by ROOKIEZ is PUNK'D (episodes 1–12)
- OP 02 : "Yowamushi na Honoo" by DIRTY OLD MEN (now known as MAGIC OF LiFE) (eps. 13–25)
- OP 03 : "Be As One" by Team Sōhoku (eps. 26–38)
- OP 04 : "Determination" by LASTGASP (Grande Road eps. 1–12)
- OP 05 : "Remind" by ROOKIEZ is PUNK'D (Grande Road eps. 13–24)
- OP 06 : "Cadence" by Natsushiro Takaaki (New Generation, episodes 1–12)
- OP 07 : "Transit" by Natsushiro Takaaki (New Generation, episodes 13–24)
- OP 08 : "Boku no Koe" by Rhythmic Toy World (Glory Line, episodes 1–12)
- OP 09 : "Dancing" by Saeki YouthK (Glory Line, episodes 13–25)
- OP 10 : "Keep Going" by 04 Limited Sazabys (Limit Break, episodes 1–13)
- OP 11 : "Last Scene" (ラストシーン) by Novelbright (Limit Break, episodes 14–24)

Ending themes

- ED 01 : "Kaze wo Yokube" by Under Graph (eps. 1–12)
- ED 02 : "I'm Ready" by AUTRIBE feat. DIRTY OLD MEN (eps. 13–25)
- ED 03 : "Glory Road" by Team Hakone Gakuen (eps. 26–38)
- ED 04 : "Realize" by ROOKiEZ is PUNK'D (Grande Road eps. 1–12)
- ED 05 : "Eikou no Ichibyou" by MAGIC OF LiFE (Grande Road eps. 13–24)
- ED 06 : "Now Or Never" by Saeki Yuusuke (New Generation, episodes 1–12)
- ED 07 : "Takai Tokoro" by Saeki Yuusuke (New Generation, episodes 13–24)
- ED 08 : "Carry the Hope" by THE HIGH CADENCE (Glory Line, episodes 1–12)
- ED 09 : "Over the Limit" by ROUTE85 (Glory Line, episodes 13–25)
- ED 10 : "PRIDE" by Novelbright (Limit Break, episodes 1–13)
- ED 11 : "Action" (アクション) by Yamashita Daiki (Limit Break, episodes 14–25)

== Yowamushi Pedal ==
No. overall	No. in season	Title	Original airdate
1	1	"Because I Can Go to Akiba for Free"; Transliteration: "Akiba ni Tada de Ikerukara" (Japanese: アキバにタダで行けるから)	October 7, 2013
Onoda Sakamichi is a huge anime fan that travels 90 km round trip to Akiba on his mommy bike so he can purchase more anime goods weekly. He hates athletic teams, believing he has no athletic prowess and that the club teams are too violent. He joins Chiba Sohoku Public High School and hopes to find friends in the anime and manga club, but he learns it has been suspended due to low member amounts. Onoda hopes to restart the club, but he runs into an unexpected cyclist, Imaizumi Shunsuke, that could change his plans forever. Imaizumi plans on joining the bicycle racing team and getting revenge on another cyclist, Midousuji, for his only defeat from the past. Kanzaki Miki and Tachibana Aya also make their debuts and question why Onoda would travel to Akiba on a bicycle rather than taking a bus.
TBA	2	"To Recruit More Members"; Transliteration: "Buin o Fuyasu Tame" (Japanese: 部員をふやすため)	October 14, 2013
After witnessing Onoda's climbing while singing, Imaizumi challenges Onoda to a race up the school's steep rear gate slope. To spice up the competition, Imaizumi agrees to join the anime/manga club if he loses. Onoda goes at everything with all his determination hoping to reform the club. Meanwhile Miki, her friends, and some of the bicycle club members hear about the race and decide to watch it.
3	3	"I Don't Have Any Friends"; Transliteration: "Boku wa Tomodachi Inaikara" (Japanese: 僕は友達いないから)	October 21, 2013
The race between Onoda and Imaizumi continues. Imaizumi has passed Onoda, but thanks to a seat adjustment from Miki, Onoda has more power than ever before. With the additional power he manages to catch Imaizumi. The race comes to its exciting conclusion, but little does either individual realize Onoda's efforts have attracted the attention of the rest of the Sohoku Bicycle team.
4	4	"Naruko Shoukichi"; Transliteration: "Naruko Shoukichi" (Japanese: 鳴子章吉)	October 28, 2013
The rear slope race has finished, and Onoda has returned to Akiba to buy some more anime goods. There he runs into Naruko Shoukichi, a boy with a Kansai accent who is riding a bike. Naruko reveals he is originally from Osaka, but his family moved for work reasons, and he is in Akiba for the first time. Onoda buys some goods for Naruko's younger siblings, and the two become friends. When a passing car throws a cigarette butt at Onoda's bike, Naruko becomes infuriated, and he talks Onoda into pursuing this car with him on their bikes. Thanks to Miki, Onoda has gained a new front derailleur that might just provide him and Naruko the means to catch the car.
5	5	"The Sōhoku High School Bicycle Racing Team"; Transliteration: "Souhoku Koukou Jitensha Kyougi-bu" (Japanese: 総北高校自転車競技部)	November 4, 2013
Onoda returns to High School where he runs into Naruko at his school's store. Naruko encourages Onoda to join the cycling club, which he plans to join the next day, but Onoda doesn't want to give up on his dreams of an anime club. After school, Onoda observes the bicycle racing club's practice and decides he wants to see how he compares to them in a competition. Onoda also meets another first year who decides to distribute any advice one might need, since he has three years of experience, in Terufumi Sugimoto. When he submits his application to the club, Onoda meets fellow first years in Kawada and Sakurai, but nothing could have prepared him for his first task, the Welcoming Race, which he'll have to participate in on his mommy bike against everyone's road racers.
6	6	"Welcoming Race"; Transliteration: "Uerukamu Rēsu" (Japanese: ウエルカムレース)	November 11, 2013
The welcoming race begins. Onoda is excited about the prospect of facing off with Imazmi and Naruko, but he quickly realizes he stands no chance against the others with his mommy bike. Onoda refuses to give up, even when the captain comes up in the recovery vehicle and demands Onoda pull over. Onoda thinks the captain wants him to quit. Little does Onoda realize he is about to gain a great equalizer that could help propel him to the front as long as he can keep his balance. Onoda is given the team's spare road racer, but with only a limited amount of time to get used to it, will Onoda be able to go on?
7	7	"I Want to Catch Up!"; Transliteration: "Oitsukitai!" (Japanese: 追いつきたい!)	November 18, 2013
With his new road racer Onoda quickly moves up from sixth into fourth place and makes up a five-minute deficit. The captain sees Onoda's determination and decides to test his skills. He tells Onoda specifically what cadence he will need to go up the mountain if he is to catch Imaizumi and Naruko. As the recovery van matches Onoda's speed, they pass the other first years, minus Imaizumi and Naruko, and decide to let the second years coming from behind keep an eye on those three while they keep an eye on Onoda. An additional three minutes need to be made up if Onoda is to have any chance of catching them. Meanwhile Imaizumi and Naruko come upon an old man on the side of the road who is cheering for any cyclist that goes by. When the old man appears to fall the two stop. The old man thanks them for their help but then warns them a third individual is coming up to make this race interesting. The two realize that the individual must be connected to the bicycle race club and get back on their bikes. As Mr. Pierre watches the two continue they wonder if it is Onoda or some other individual that is gaining ground fast.
8	8	"Sprint Climb!!"; Transliteration: "Supurinto Kuraimu!!" (Japanese: スプリントクライム!!)	November 25, 2013
Onoda manages to catch up to Imaizumi and Naruko. Seeing Onoda ignites their fighting spirits. The three decide to test each other's abilities as they race for the top of the mountain and see which of the three of them deserves to be the King of the Mountain from Sohoku's first years. Naruko eventually begins to drift as he doesn't do well in the mountains when the grade changes, but instead of letting Onoda slow down and stay with him, he chooses to give him his fighting spirit. Onoda moves on up and challenges Imaizumi for the title of King of the Mountain. As the third years watch on, they wonder what it is that keep Onoda going on, and the coach talks about how much extra fun Onoda must be having for the first time.
9	9	"Full Power vs. Full Power"; Transliteration: "Zenryoku VS Zenryoku" (Japanese: 全力VS全力)	December 2, 2013
500 meters remain to the peak, and Onoda and Imaizumi are the only two left who can claim the title King of the Mountain. Onoda raises his RPM's by another 30 to catch up to Imaizumi, but can he maintain that speed over the finish line of stage 2? After the mountain stage finishes, Onoda finds himself out of stamina. Despite the seniors wanting to help him, he is forced to retire from the race, but the coach awards him for his efforts with something that surprises the other first years and makes Onoda decide to stay with the cycling team for the remainder of his time at Sohoku.
10	10	"Peak Spider"; Transliteration: "Piiku Supaidaa" (Japanese: ピークスパイダー)	December 9, 2013
With the welcoming race over, each of the first years is given special training by other members of the team. Onoda is teamed up with Makishima, Naruko with Tadokoro, and Imaizumi with Captain Kinjo. A specific racing route from the front slope of the school to the rear slope of the school is assigned along with the simple mission of learning from their seniors. Makishima debuts his special dancing, similar to a spiders web being weaved, which Onoda tries to duplicate, but Makishima helps him realize that instead of copying others, Onoda needs to realize what his own specialty is and master it. It is also revealed that Sugimoto finished third in the welcoming race.
11	11	"Human Bullet Train!!"; Transliteration: "Nikudan Ressha!!" (Japanese: 肉弾列車!!)	December 16, 2013
One day has passed since the special training took place. The freshmen are all in classes when Imaizumi comes in and tells them he just learned from the second years that the Inter High Preliminaries started that morning. Onoda, Naruko, and Imaizumi rush an hour away to the prelim site and find that Sohoku is in 3rd place, 50 seconds behind two other teams, with only two laps remaining. Instead of panicking, Tadokoro tells the first years to keep a close eye out as Sohoku will take the race by a full minute. Sohoku unleashes their specialty human bullet train attack and goes into first place by a full minute with one lap remaining. As Naruko and Imaizumi try to figure out how they can defeat the 3rd years. Kinjo comes up and says they plan on releasing the first years at the main Inter High competition if they can endure a special training camp. The following day Hakone learns the results and swears to crush their rivals. However one member of the team, Manami, has chosen to skip the meeting and is found taking a ride through the mountains, wondering if his class rep is going to be angry when he shows up late.
12	12	"First Day of Camp!"; Transliteration: "Gasshuku Shonichi!" (Japanese: 合宿初日!)	December 23, 2013
Sohoku heads to a special cycling facility in the Mountains above Hakone. Onoda gets sick on the way and is let out of the van to wait for the coach in the car. While waiting Onoda decides to get some water until he realizes he has left his wallet in the van. Manami arrives shortly after and offers him his water bottle. Instead of taking his water bottle back, Manami tells Onoda to keep it. When Onoda arrives at the camp, Kinjo breaks out special training for the first and second years that are there. They must complete 1000 km to be eligible to participate in the Inter High within four days' time. However adjustments have been made to Naruko's, Imaizumi's, and Onoda's bikes. Naruko must complete the 1000 km without his lower handlebars. Imaizumi must complete the 1000 km without his gear shifters. Onoda isn't told what his special training is, but old heavy tires have been subbed out on his bike that will force him to adjust his cycling style. These three seniors, two second-years (Teshima and Aoyagi), and Sugimoto also participate in the special training, all without any modifications to their bikes. With a little help from Makishima, Onoda is able to learn how it'll be easier for him to ride, but the changes give Onoda a large deficit in terms of laps covered, and he's not sure he'll be able to master the training before time runs out.
13	13	"Imaizumi and Naruko's 1000km" Transliteration: "Imaizumi to Naruko no 1000km" (Japanese: 今泉と鳴子の1000km)	January 6, 2014
The first day of training is over. Imaizumi, Naruko, and Sugimoto have all managed to complete 200 km while Onoda has only completed 165 km. Onoda takes Mikishima's advice and is able to start covering ground at a faster rate. The captain instructs everyone to plan their own breaks as needed and to make each break last 10 to 15 minutes. He also decides to start 30 minutes after everyone else. Sugimoto introduces energy jellies to Onoda after Onoda completes 250 km and admits he is feeling rather stiff. Meanwhile Imaizumi and Naruko go as long as they can without taking a break hoping to gain ground on their seniors, but neither can pull away from the other. At the end of Day 2, Cycle Time contacts Sohoku and requests an interview for the upcoming Inter-High. The captain asks Naruko if he wants to do it, but Naruko turns him down. As Sohoku's members fall asleep, we shift to Kyoto Fushimi High School where we learn how Midosuji is training his team. Finally we shift to Hakone and see how their training is going on.
14	14	"Reunion at Dawn"; Transliteration: "Asagiri no Saikai" (Japanese: 朝霧の再会)	January 13, 2014
As Day 3 begins, Onoda gets up earlier than everyone else to begin his day of work hoping he can slowly pull himself back into the competition. He has only completed 390 km to date, and the task of completing another 610 km in two days seems overbearing. Meanwhile Manami sneaks into the cycling training center Sohoku is at hoping to find the mysterious climber that Toudou told him of. However he has arrived earlier than anyone else, and Onoda is the only one out on the track. Onoda runs into Manami and tries to return his water bottle. Manami instead proposes a race between him and Onoda. The condition- if Manami wins, Onoda has to keep the water bottle. As their race comes to an exciting conclusion, Manami realizes that Onoda is under a special training regimen and says for Onoda to return his water bottle to him, but only when they see each other at the Inter-High. Onoda begins to wonder if he truly has any chance of finishing and determines to do his best until the end.
15	15	"Strategy"; Transliteration: "Sakuryaku" (Japanese: 策略)	January 20, 2014
Manami's words have excited Onoda. He begins matching paces and laps with Imaizumi and Naruko, despite being in last place, hoping he can move up and claim an Inter-High spot. The captain switches the viewing screen from class to laps completed which leads to a race between the second years and our three first years. However Teshima and Aoyagi have carefully thought up a plan they believe will lead them to an easy Inter-High roster spot. Teshima has been riding a lap ahead of the others, and when the first years come up on them, he helps Aoyagi perform a breakaway while he acts as a road block for our trio. If Onoda, Imaizumi, and Naruko can't get past Teshima, they'll find themselves being lapped and failing to make the Inter-High. Can any of them get past Teshima while they're working on their own, or will Teshima's prophecy that the first years will drop out in 3 more laps come to pass due to the nightly rule of no lapping others in the dark?
16	16	"Breakthrough"; Transliteration: "Itten Toppa" (Japanese: 一点突破)	January 27, 2014
Imaizumi and Naruko continue to challenge Teshima and try to get past him. However Teshima has been conserving his leg strength and is able to continue to block them and catch them when they try to break away. With no other choice left, Imaizumi and Naruko put all of their hopes in Onoda who challenges Teshima on a climb. Teshima uses most of his strength to stay even with Onoda, and he reveals he has timed Onoda's fastest climb carefully to where he knows when Onoda will slow down. Now Onoda must endure more on this climb than ever before if he is to pass Teshima. Failure to do so will result in all the first years leg strength having been used and will leave all three of them out of the Inter-high. Will Onoda manage to prevail and prove Teshima's predictions can't account for one's growth?
17	17	"Onoda in Last Place"; Transliteration: "Saigobi no Onoda" (Japanese: 最後尾の小野田)	February 3, 2014
After Onoda breaks through Teshima loses the heart to fight, and Imaizumi and Naruko are also able to pass him. Not wanting to show weakness, Teshima allows Aoyagi to capture him. With Aoyagi taking the lead, Teshima and Aoyagi manage to use tag biking to catch back up to our trio. All five bikers go into a full-out sprint, but Onoda's lack of experience pushes him back into last place. Now Onoda must summon up his last bit of strength to catch up to everyone. Onoda's second strength in cycling is about to be revealed to the entire Sohoku team.
18	18	"All-Out Battle"; Transliteration: "Zenryoku no Shoubu" (Japanese: 全力の勝負)	February 10, 2014
All five cyclists make a desperate sprint for the start-finish line, where the captain has put up the no passing sign. If the first years can cross the line first, they will not only manage to catch the second years, but they will be able to increase their lead on them as long as they continue cycling in the night. The third years watch carefully to see whom will cross first, knowing they will be the best candidates to take to the Inter-High. After the all-out battle, the fourth day of training must be completed in the rain. Onoda has some bad luck when his pedals shatter and force him to walk his bike up every hill. However Onoda has earned the respect of the second years, and Teshima makes Onoda stop. With a little help from Teshima, Onoda gains the needed supplies to reach 1000 km. The only question is can he do so before the clock strikes midnight?
19	19	"A New Start"; Transliteration: "Aratanaru Sutaato" (Japanese: 新たなるスタート)	February 17, 2014
Sohoku returns to school from their training camp ready to spend a Saturday full of makeup lessons. Onoda realizes he has grown and tests his abilities by leaving a bit later, along with a little help from his anime watching habits. Onoda thinks back to the previous night when the captain tried to tell him about the upcoming Inter-High, but when the Captain gets cut off and pulled into another call Onoda begins to give up on his dream of going to the Inter-High. It isn't into their last makeup class, which is done by Mr. Pierre, that Onoda learns the full message the captain was trying to tell him. Onoda is given his team jersey and made the sixth member for the upcoming Inter-High. Afterwards Sohoku's team is given special training by the captain that will test all their abilities. Onoda worries he will slow everyone down and begins to drift away. With a little help from the Captain though, Onoda learns what it means to be part of a team and begins to succeed more than he thought was ever possible.
20	20	"Manami Sangaku"; Transliteration: "Manami Sangaku" (Japanese: 真波山岳)	February 24, 2014
With Sohoku's team set, we shift over to Hakone to view their training. Individual elimination races have been held by Hakone, and five team spots have been filled. They are down to their final spot with a duel between two climbers. Manami is about to take center stage and unveil a secret weapon he has that most others don't, the ability to sense the wind. Even with this advantage, will Manami be able to claim the final spot from second year member Kuroda? In Chiba Tadokoro has the first years join him at Makishima's house where they watch the Hakone Road Relay. He tells the first years to pay close attention to the ground as it's the same course the Inter-High will be taking place on.
21	21	"Snake of the Stone Path"; Transliteration: "Ishi-dou no hebi" (Japanese: 石道の蛇)	March 3, 2014
The first years learn about the previous years Inter-High and the rivalry between Kinjou and Fukutomi that has formed. Kinjou recounts how a crash took place last year, and Fukutomi arrives to beg for forgiveness. However he also vows that Sohoku will have no chance of dethroning the kings that are Hakone.
22	22	"The Inter-High Begins"; Transliteration: "Intaa-hai Kaimaku" (Japanese: インターハイ開幕)	March 10, 2014
The team arrives at Enoshima for the start of the race. Kinjou explains what each persons number means and how they will start with a parade of everyone involved. Interviews are held with many of Hakone's members as they are heavy favorites to repeat. However Midousuji also gets the mic and promises that he will win it all and embarrass all the other gross teams around. Onoda is tense at first, but after falling once he becomes more comfortable. Meanwhile Imaizumi plots how he will get revenge on Midosuji during this race.
23	23	"Top Sprinter!!"; Transliteration: "Toppu Supurintaa!!" (Japanese: トップスプリンター！！)	March 17, 2014
The episode begins with a flashback as Onoda tries to explain to his mother that he is a member of the bicycle racing club, but she gets confused and thinks he is referring to a new anime. Back to the present, and the race begins with the parade of everyone. Once they get out of the city, the sprinters get to shine. At first Tadokoro and Naruko stay back, but it's all part of psychological warfare. As the two pass everyone and move to the front it looks like it will be between them to determine who is the top sprinter. Just as they are getting comfortable though, another sprinter emerges from behind and passes everyone all the way to the front. Izumida has arrived, and the action has only begun.
24	24	"Trembling Izumida"; Transliteration: "Furueru Izumida" (Japanese: 震える泉田)	March 24, 2014
Izumida refuses to zip up his jersey, saying there's not enough competition for him to do so. He begins to criticize Naruko and Tadokoro for not working together and having one shield for the other. However Naruko and Tadokoro have been holding back. Naruko unveils his time trial Rocket man Sprint. As Naruko begins to catch up to Izumida, Tadokoro gets mad and sucks up a giant amount of oxygen. The additional oxygen in his lungs allows him to accelerate and catch up. Izumida's abs start throbbing, and he zips up his jersey realizing he's in for a true race.
25	25	"Loss"; Transliteration: "Make" (Japanese: 負け)	March 31, 2014
Izumida, Tadokoro, and Naruko have revealed all their techniques. Now there's only 700 m left to the first check point. All three go all out and continue to increase their speed. However the wind becomes stronger than ever before and starts pushing over some of the cones. In the end it will be the wind, cones, and experience that decides who takes the first check point, and the result will leave most of the pack shocked.
26	26	"I Can See The Sky"; Transliteration: "Sora ga Mieru" (Japanese: 空が見える)	April 7, 2014
The sprinters come back to the pack after the first check point has been won, and Tadokoro and Naruko receive congratulations for their excellent performances. The rest of the Sohoku team is able to move to the front of the pack. As the teams approach the feed station, Minami senses through the wind that a wreck is about to take place. Onoda, trying to keep up with the rest of the team, isn't able to stop and gets caught in the wreck. When he comes to, Onoda wonders why he can see the sky. Onoda realizes his chain has to be put back on his bike. After getting it back on, Onoda is approached by race officials. He is in last place, and they want to know if he wants to retire from the race.
27	27	"Toudou, God of the Mountains"; Transliteration: "Sanjin Toudou" (Japanese: 山神東堂)	April 14, 2014
Toudou, the ace climber from Hakone, reveals he and Makishima have a race history of having participated in 14 races, being tied at 7 each. In reality they participated in 15 races together, but they don't count one race as Makishima's chain broke during the race when it was down to the two of them. The Inter-High is supposed to be the all-out tiebreaker for the two of them. Toudou does a little urging, but Makishima refuses to give into his prodding. Eventually Arakita tells Toudou to go on because it is apparent Sohoku only has one climber. After cursing the rest of the Sohoku team for not being prepared for this stage, Toudou moves on and begins passing others as he moves toward the fronts. However Makishima doesn't look depressed. Instead he looks motivated and tells Arakita that in 3 minutes' time, everything will change.
28	28	"100 Man Barrier"; Transliteration: "Hyaku-nin no sekisho" (Japanese: 100人の関所)	April 21, 2014
After falling and landing in last place, Onoda must find a way to pass 100 men. Teshima lets Onoda know he thinks it's possible if Onoda will just focus, and the support team relaunches Onoda into action. The task proves to be difficult with the small mountain roads and the pack in front of him, but with a little help from his favorite anime song, Onoda finds his spirits lifted. Onoda counts each individual as he begins passing them. At the front of the race, Arakita swears that Onoda will never catch them before the end of the day due to the small road and the pack blocking the way. As Onoda reaches the final man to pass, he runs into Midosuji, who shows a secret he has kept from everyone that would allow him to win all legs of the race if he truly wanted to try. Eventually Onoda passes Midosuji and zooms up to meet his teammates. Onoda takes over as the head of his teams drifting pack while Makishima starts his breakaway with his spider climbing.
29	29	"The Summit"; Transliteration: "Sanchou" (Japanese: 山頂)	April 28, 2014
Toudou has claimed an easy lead, but his spirit is drifting as he feels he will win the king of the mountain part of the race too easily. As he closes in on the top of the mountain, Makishima comes up into second place, having made up a 3 minute difference. The two race for the Summit to break their tie and claim the title of King of the Mountain. As the winner of the mountain is revealed, the aces begin their moves to the front to claim the Leg 1 winner's spot.
30	30	"Arakita and Imaizumi"; Transliteration: "Arakita and Imaizumi" (Japanese: 荒北と今泉)	May 5, 2014
Arakita and Imaizumi help pull Kinjou and Fukutomi toward the finish line hoping to help their team gain the advantage. The history of how Arakita became a racing demon is revealed, and Imaizumi realizes what it is he needs to do to help his team succeed. As the four racers get 500 yards from the finish, Sohoku and Hakone find themselves in a dead heat.
31	31	"The Strong Three"; Transliteration: "Tsuwamono san-nin" (Japanese: 強者3人)	May 12, 2014
The battle of the aces has begun as Kinjou and Fukutomi try to claim day 1. Everyone is shocked when Midousuji catches up to them from the pack. Imaizumi tries to keep Midousuji from passing him, but it's too little, too late. Midousuji reveals his dream of how he will pass everyone with 50 yards to go. When 50 yards arrive though, a three-way tie is in place. The three race for the finish line. After everyone else arrives, the Leg 1 Awards ceremony is held.
32	32	"Night of Hope"; Transliteration: "Kibou no Yoru" (Japanese: 希望の夜)	May 19, 2014
Tadokoro has fallen ill and is unable to keep any food down. Meanwhile Imaizumi doubts his reasons for racing after letting Midosuji pass him in Leg 1 of the race. While the members of the Sohoku racing team try to overcome their ailments during this night of hope, Onoda receives a surprise visit from his mom. The next day begins as Tadokoro explains how Leg 2's racing order starts. Onoda remembers the assignment that Kinjou gave him the night before. As it comes time for Sohoku and Hakone to leave, Makishima realizes that Tadokoro hasn't left the start line.
33	33	"You Are the Princess"; Transliteration: "Hime nano da" (Japanese: ヒメなのだ)	May 26, 2014
Tadokoro claims he is giving everyone a handicap so they can race him, but as he leaves he is unable to climb at full strength. Makishima tells Onoda and Naruko that they must leave him behind, and when they keep pestering him he finally reveals that Tadokoro has fallen ill. Instead of listening to Makishima, Onoda reminds Makishima of the orders he has been given. Onoda remains behind while Naruko and Makishima keep moving on. Tadokoro finally catches up to Onoda, and Onoda convinces him to help him on the chorus of the Love Hime opening song, Love Princess Pancake. By singing the chorus/refrain continually they slowly begin to catch up and end up with the pack. Meanwhile Hakone Academy's entire team has caught up to their ace, and Kyoto Fushimi has pullen away from the pack to join Midosuji. Midosuji tells Imaizumi that all the players are here as he claims Sohoku has made a fatal judging error in not saving anyone for Day 2.
34	34	"Shinkai Hayato"; Transliteration: "Shinkai Hayato" (Japanese: 新開隼人)	June 2, 2014
After catching up to Sohoku, Midosuji reveals he never considered Sohoku to be a real threat and that he isn't interested in challenging Imaizumi. Imaizumi's confidence suffers a further blow when Midosuji has his teammates accelerate. They manage to catch up to Hakone Academy in two minutes time. 5 kilometers from the sprint marker Midosuji challenges Hakone to a sprint race. Izumida accepts the challenge, but Shinkai Hayato stops him and instead decides to challenge Midosuji. Izumida reveals the numbers at Hakone are strategically placed: 1 is the ace, 2 is the ace's assistant, 3 is the ace climber, and 4 is the ace sprinter. Hayato and Midosuji accelerate, with Hayato saying he isn't doing the sprint for pride. Midosuji begins to panic when he realizes that Hayato is leading him without putting in any real effort. Midosuji is forced to go all out to manage to catch Hayato. In a flashback we see how Hayato almost quit cycling after hitting a mother rabbit. Juichi talks with the senior class to help them understand why Hayato wants to quit the team. In the end though Juichi promises that if Hayato comes back this following year, he will wear tag #4. As we return to the race, Midosuji cries in despair as Hayato continues to get further and further away.
35	35	"The Winner"; Transliteration: "Shouri Suru Otoko" (Japanese: 勝利する男)	June 9, 2014
Naruko and Makishima have caught Kinjou and Imaizumi. However Imaizumi refuses to draft. When other teams begin catching up from the pack, they tell Sohoku's members that Onoda and Tadokoro are making their way through the pack. This news fills Sohoku with hope, and Kinjou takes the lead to prevent anyone else from passing them while they catchup to Hakone and Kyoto Fushimi. Meanwhile Midosuji reveals he has been playing around with Hayato and catches up easily. Eventually Midosuji passes Hayato and says he will only let him pass on the left. We learn that Hayato has been afraid to pass on the left ever since he killed the rabbit, but thanks to special training with his teammates, he has overcome that obstacle by gaining the ability to transform into the Demon of Hakone. Hayato passes Midosuji and is pulling away with only 500 meters to go to the Sprint check. Seeing no other choice, Midosuji removes some tape on his legs that has been constraining his speed. Midosuji manages to get side-by-side with less than 200 meters remaining. Now it is anyone's sprint to win.
36	36	"Strongest and Fastest"; Transliteration: "Saikyou Saisoku" (Japanese: 最強最速)	June 16, 2014
Hayato and Midosuji continue to race for the Sprint Check point. Hayato realizes that Midosuji's leaning forward acts as a hindrance and thinks he will have the win. At the last second Midosuji throws all his weight to the back of his bike, propelling the frame forward and giving him the sprint check point by .02 seconds. Sohoku manages to reach the feed zone in third place, and Makishima reveals that while their teammates might not catch up on the flats, the second stage ends with a climb up Mt. Fuji, where Onoda will surely excel. Further back Onoda and Tadokoro catch-up to Kumamoto Daiichi, the Higo Super Express. It's the start of the climb, and Onoda raises his pace. As they pass Kumamoto Daichi, Tadokoro reveals he has fully recovered thanks to Onoda drafting for him. Realizing he can't go any faster, Tadokoro proposes to Onoda that they sing even though they don't need to pass anyone. After the two sing the opening song in unison, Onoda proposes they sing the closing song next. Tadokoro remembers when Coach Pierre taught them all that bicycles are actually meant for fun, and he realizes it isn't the song that gives Onoda his strength. Instead it is the joy of cycling. Finally in the final 30 kilometers they catch up with their teammates. With their arrival, the atmosphere completely changes for Sohoku. Kinjou gives one final order. Makishima and Onoda are to lead the team up Mount Fuji so they can compete for the days title. Further up the mountain Hakone appears to be falling apart, and Midosuji can't contain his laughter. Silently he declares it is time to finish Hakone once and for all.
37	37	"Passing the Crown"; Transliteration: "Ōja Kōtai" (Japanese: 王者交代)	June 23, 2014
Hakone's sprinters continue to fall further behind and people wonder if Hakone is falling apart. Midosuji senses weakness within Hakone and announces his team will skip phases 11 and 12 of their Day 2 plan on go straight to phase 13 as they accelerate to the finish line. Phase 13 abandons the sprinters who can't accelerate up the mountain, which results in Ihara and Yamaguchi being left behind by Kyoto Fushimi. Fukutomi decides to pursue them for Hakone with Toudou. Ihara and Yamaguchi collapse and then withdraw from the race. Izumida begins thinking either him, Hayato, or Arakita will be next as they are all hanging their heads down. Up at the front Midosuji declares Fukutomi is exactly like him. Midosuji easily takes the mountain check point thanks to the 4-on-2 advantage, and Midosuji declares this is the moment the crown passes from Hakone. Ishigaki begins to think about the team he wanted to form and how Midosuji destroyed his vision, causing him to slow down until Midosuji threatens to leave him behind. When Ishigaki admits he was reminiscing, Midosuji declares it is only by abandoning everything that victory can arise for him and the team. Eventually Ishigaki confronts Fukutomi on why he abandoned his teammates, and Fukutomi declares he didn't abandon them. With 8 kilometers left, Ishigaki realizes someone is catching them from behind. Fukutomi declares that their team has no dead weight and that his teammates will come.
38	38	"The Soul of Sohoku"; Transliteration: "Souhoku no Tamashii" (Japanese: 総北の魂)	June 30, 2014
With 6 kilometers to go Fukutomi accelerates and catches up to the front pack. Midosuji tries to calm his team and point out that it is all within the parameters he expected, but Fukutomi declares it won't be a two-team race. As Midosuji looks behind him, Sohoku rises up from the ashes and catches up. Realizing their goal has been met, Onoda begins to lose speed and nearly falls over twice. Fukutomi tries to convince Kinjou that his team is too exhausted to compete, but Imaizumi and Naruko help an exhausted Onoda as they manage to keep up. Onoda starts pedaling on his own, and Tadokoro and Naruko help the team draft up the mountain to keep pace with Hakone. As Sohoku and Hakone begin to pull away, Midosuji decides to try one last final move, phase 49. As the downhill battle begins the aces and their launching pads move to the front. Only 4 km remain in Day 2, and it is anyone's race to win.

== Yowamushi Pedal Grande Road ==
A second season of the series began in October 2014. Season 2 picks up where Season 1 left off, concluding Day 2 and the rest of Day 3 of the 41st Summer Inter-High. Joining the Sohoku team is Machimiya Eikichi and the entire Hiroshima Kureminami Technical High School bicycle team. Their sole goal is to take down Hakone Academy. Season 2 lasts 24 episodes.

No. overall	No. in season	Title	Original airdate
39	1	"Phase 49"; Transliteration: "Phase 49" (Japanese: フェイズ49)	October 6, 2014
Phase 49 is launched. Nobuyuki Mizuta blocks Arakita, forcing Fukutomi to work alone while Imaizumi and Kinjou are able to work as a duo. Meanwhile Midosuji has Ishigaki to work with. However Hakone has tricked them all. As soon as the climb is over Shinkai races to the front and is able to assist Fukutomi. Midosuji decides everyone around him must be zombies and hits Imaizumi's handlebars, making it looking like an accident and causing him to start to fall. Instead of falling, Imaizumi intentionally hits the rail to boost himself back up and keep riding. Imaizumi reveals he no longer cares about Midosuji and keeps riding, propelling Kinjou back into second place. Realizing that Imaizumi is no longer weak, Midosuji announces they'll cancel all phases and win solely based on their strength. No more tricks will be involved. The three teams remain neck-and-neck until Ishigaki begins to slip on the final turn. Surprisingly Midosuji catches him, and the momentum of the fall propels the two of them to the front with only 1200 meters left.
40	2	"The Aces"; Transliteration: "Ace-tachi" (Japanese: エースたち)	October 13, 2014
Ishigaki launches Midosuji ahead before the turn, and be almost crashing he increases his lead to four seconds. Shinkai and Imazumi launch their aces ahead at 1000 meters. The two remember the previous year and accelerate determine to give each other the best race possible. They overcome the four second gap before Midosuji accelerates with 700 m to the finish line. The fans think the way Midosuji races is gross but realizes he will be difficult to overcome with that monstrous aura. Kinjou realizes Midosuji has destroyed almost all his skin so he can ride precariously. Kinjou proclaims this could be a problem, but Fukutomi declares he doesn't care, that he will beat them both. 300 meters remain to the finish line, and an all out sprint between the three aces is just beginning as the episode ends.
41	3	"Akira"; Transliteration: "Akira" (Japanese: 翔)	October 20, 2014
With 250 meters left to go Midosuji raises his hands in victory, but he realizes that Kinjou and Fukutomi are slowly gaining on him. In a flashback, Midosuji's tragic childhood and how he became the road racer he currently is are seen. Midosuji doesn't realize he has overworked himself and vows to keep his legs moving at all costs. However with 100 meters left he realizes his legs are beginning to slow down. With 50 meters left Kinjou and Fukutomi manage to pass him, and Midosuji realizes his dream of dominating stage 2 is at an end. Almost as if in response to his emotional breakdown, one of Midosuji's perfect teeth take the moment to crack, and Midosuji declares himself just another loser.
42	4	"Resolution"; Transliteration: "Kakugo" (Japanese: 覚悟)	October 27, 2014
Sohoku and Hakone's first years learn what true resolution is about and what happens if you finish more than an hour behind the leaders on the second day. Meanwhile Midosuji declares he will drop out and refuses to go to the daily awards ceremony.
43	5	"The Three Kilometers to the Pharmacy"; Transliteration: "Yakkyoku made no 3 km" (Japanese: 薬局までの3km)	November 3, 2014
Midosuji decides to drop out of the Inter High and bike back home. However Onoda shows up on the mountainous route, causing Midosuji to end up racing him instead. Onoda unintentionally helps Midosuji return to his team. Before the race begins, Machimiya Eikichi of Hiroshima Kureminami Technical High School tells Sohoku High School and Hakone Academy that they will take first place because it is "in the stars".
44	6	"Those Who Have"; Transliteration: "Motteru Otoko" (Japanese: モってる男)	November 10, 2014
As Day 3 is about to begin the third years discuss how this has essentially become a two-team race due to the number of dropouts and eliminated racers. However Hiroshima Kureminami Technical High School reveals they also have all six members and vow they will surpass the champs and challengers using the pack.
45	7	"The Pack Approaches"; Transliteration: "Semaru, Shuudan" (Japanese: 迫る, 集団)	November 17, 2014
Machimiya Eikichi convinces the pack to go as fast as they can so they can drag the leaders back into the pack. When the pack catches up Arakita decides to try and slow them down and Onoda gets pulled in. Machimiya Eikichi then signals for his teammates to pull to the front. Hiroshima Kureminami Technical High School pulls away from the pack and challenges Sohoku and Hakone for the right to become the champions.
46	8	"Arakita"; Transliteration: "Arakita" (Japanese: アラキタ)	November 24, 2014
After being pulled into the pack Onoda tries to convince Arakita to team up with him so they can catch back up to the front. At first Arakita refuses, but after hearing how honest Onoda is he consents. Before they leave the pack though, Arakita reveals a third person will be joining them. Manami, Arakita, and Onoda work together to catch but up to and surpass their teammates.
47	9	"The Fighting Dog of Kure"; Transliteration: "Kure no Touken" (Japanese: 呉の闘犬)	December 1, 2014
Machimiya Eikichi makes his move and challenges Manami, Arakita, and Onoda to a two-flag relay distance. Whichever team can pull two flag lengths ahead of the other first gets to go full blast to the leaders while the other stops to wait for their teammates. In the process Eikichi reveals that he has secretly entered into an alliance with Midosuji to crush Hakone. Hiroshima Kureminami Technical High School has three cyclists break away from their team train and reveals all three are world class sprinters. However Arakita is able to continually match them in speed, and before the end of the day he begins to laugh and tells Eikichi that he is exactly like he (Arakita) once was.
48	10	"The Domain That Lies Ahead"; Transliteration: "Sono Saki no Ryouiki" (Japanese: その先の領域)	December 8, 2014
Machimiya's hatred towards Hakone causes him to headbutt Arakita. He decides to race ahead, but once again Arakita, Onoda, and Manami catch up. Arakita envisions how he became an ace sprinter for Hakone and thinks about how he used to be like Machimiya. He reveals some of the info toward Machimiya. Eventually Machimiya realizes that Arakita's will appears to be stronger and that Arakita isn't going to drop out. The final battle between the two sprint teams begins.
49	11	"Survival"; Transliteration: "Survival" (Japanese: サバイバル)	December 15, 2014
Arakita defeats Machimiya and promises to by him a soda after the race so they can become friends. Machimiya's team considers continuing to the finish line, but they realize they will never be able to catch the lead pack with their determination. Arakita brings Onoda and Manami to the front of the pack where they join their captains and other teammates. Shortly afterward, the rest of Sohoku and Hakone arrive, leaving Midousuji at a huge disadvantage as the teams are now 6–6–2. However Midousuji reveals that team members for Sohoku and Hakone will shortly start dropping, with whoever is displaying the most energy falling first. Midousuji knows that once Sohoku and Hakone get down to two or three teammates each he will have a chance to win it all. The only thing is he must remain within a reasonable striking distance to have any true chance at victory.
50	12	"Izumida's Pride"; Transliteration: "Izumida no Hokori" (Japanese: 泉田の誇り)	December 22, 2014
Arakita races to the front and pulls his team as far as he can. Eventually his energy runs out, and Arakita is forced to drop out from the race. Before Sohoku can fully catch up though with a 6–5 advantage, Izumida puts all his power into a sprint and starts to pull Hakone further and further ahead until dropping out from exhaustion. The first years beg to be dropped by their seniors, but Kinjou refuses to listen to their request. He says their final order is to escort them to the mountains. Once they get to the mountains, then the team will split into two, but until they reach that point the first years still have something to learn from their seniors.
51	13	"Flat-Out Run at Lake Yamanaka"; Transliteration: "Yamanakako de no ranfurattoauto" (Japanese: 山中湖でのランフラットアウト)	January 5, 2015
Shinkai's demon sprint allows Hakone to slowly pull ahead of Sohoku even further. Not wanting to lose any ground or teammates, the seniors of Sohoku step to the front of the line and decide to rotate the lead while gaining ground. Eventually Tadokoro takes the lead and announces this will be his final sprint, but he promises he will go full blast until they catch up to Hakone. Slowly but surely Tadokoro gains speed, and as he gains speed Sohoku makes up ground on Shinkai and Hakone. He is able to pull even with Shinkai just as the two teams reach their final climb, but the energy he has used causes him to drop behind everyone. He isn't alone. Shinkai also drops back, with all his sprint energy having been spent. Hakone and Sohoku begin the final climb knowing only one team will prevail, and knowing only the best of the best can compete the final climb.
52	14	"The Final Strategy"; Transliteration: "Saigo no Sakusen" (Japanese: 最後の作戦)	January 12, 2015
The teams reach the final climb of Day 3, a massive mountain stage. Hakone makes its move and sends Manami, Toudou, and Fukutomi up the final mountain. Captain Kinjou and Makishima try to follow, but every time Kinjou tries to put pressure on his legs they seem to give out. Onoda realizes something is wrong and decides to come up and talk to him. Kinjou realizes he doesn't have to be the ace, because they all work together as a team. Kinjou decides to make up a new plan on the spot. He sends Onoda, Imazumi, and Naruko to climb the mountain with Makishima. Only two orders are given: 1) Naruko is to be more flashy and 2) one of them must take the jersey across the finish line first. Afterwards Kinjou is forced to drop out. Onoda initially takes the lead, but Naruko moves to the front to show off his new sprint climb. Further back Tadokoro reveals to Shinkai that their red spring bean is the most dangerous teammate of all because he has yet to have shown his full sprinters spirit, and that time could very well come on the final climb.
53	15	"Naruko's True Worth!"; Transliteration: "Naruko! Shinkocchou!" (Japanese: 鳴子! 真骨頂!)	January 26, 2015
Naruko refuses to give up the lead as Sohoku races up the mountain. He uses his sprinters climb to help the team gain momentum, and just as he appears to be tired Naruko decides to debut his new move: the Armstrong Climb. Naruko's spirit ignites the crowd to cheer for Sohoku, but it has some unexpected consequences. The climb slowly but surely drains Naruko's oxygen levels. Naruko refuses to give up the lead and focuses solely on the road, where he can see the white line, but he can't see anything else. Onoda decides to help but giving Naruko directions on the turns. As Sohoku catches up to Hakone Naruko slowly but surely drops back, and in the end he crashes to the side of the road unable to continue on. The last things heard are Onoda's and Imaizumi's screams for their fallen friend, but the two decide to honor what he has done and help take down Hakone.
54	16	"Imaizumi the Ace!"; Transliteration: "Ace Imaizumi!" (Japanese: エース今泉！)	February 2, 2015
Thanks to Naruko's sacrifice Sohoku manages to catch Hakone. Fukutomi admits he thought Sohoku would fall apart and yet they managed to catch up, but he says they can never prevail without a true ace. Imaizumi declares that he is the new ace and he will take first. Onoda is shocked and asks Makishima if it's ok. Makishima says it is fine because he and Toudou would never let the other finish in first as the ace. Imaizumi then decides to get reckless and move ahead on his own. Makishima keeps Toudou at bay and forces Fukutomi to pursue him. Everytime Fukutomi catches up Imaizumi puts on another burst of speed. We see how Imaizumi became addicted to road racing and how he first met the Kanzaki's. Finally we see Imaizumi thinking to himself and knowing he can win if nothing else changes. However a medical van is further back on the road. It picks up Naruko and has him withdraw from the race. They then clear the road because more racers are coming. Ishigaki collapses and then tells Midosuji to press on at full strength and he will win. An ominous wind then begins to blow as Midosuji begins to ascend the final 15 km on his own.
55	17	"Hakone Academy #6"; Transliteration: "Hakone Gakuen Zekken 6-ban" (Japanese: 箱根学園ゼッケン6番)	February 9, 2015
Midosuji catches up to Onoda and company and is able to get ahead of the ace climbers. Seeing no other choice Toudou sends Manami ahead to keep Midosuji contained. Manami quickly realizes that he won't be able to keep Midosuji from reaching the aces. Instead he decides to race him one-on-one through the mountainous climb. Midosuji quickly realizes the two are apparently even and proposes a wager on their race. The proposal that both agree to is that the loser of their individual race cannot cross the finish line before the winner. Eventually Makashima realizes that Imazumi will be at a major disadvantage if he doesn't have help against the other climbers, and seeing as Onoda has kept up with him he sends him on ahead to try and even the odds.
56	18	"Step by Step"; Transliteration: "Ippo Ippo" (Japanese: 一歩一歩)	February 16, 2015
Manami reveals how he has advanced so far in races, by using nature and feeling it out. When he senses a gust of wind coming Manami uses it to propel himself ahead of Midosuji. However Midosuji is able to copy the technique and catch up. Up ahead the aces sense they will soon be caught up to. Fukutomi believes that two racers are coming - Midosuji and Manami, but Imaizumi realizes that a third one is gaining ground quickly in Onoda. Toudou asks Makashima why he has such faith in Onoda, and Makashima reveals that Onoda has never once failed to obey an order that has been given to him. He thinks back to Onoda's many races—the uphill climb on his mommy bike, the first year race, the 1000 km race against the second years, and even his catch-ups at the Inter-High. With roughly 7 km left Onoda catches up to Midosuji and Manami. He vows to not let Midosuji catch up to the aces. Midosuji raises his speed, but Onoda surpasses Midosuji's speed and moves ahead of him.
57	19	"Sakamichi's Job"; Transliteration: "Sakamichi no Yakuwari" (Japanese: 坂道の役割)	February 23, 2015
Onoda fails to hold off Midosuji. Then he remembers the words from Naruko about how he clings to someone when racing and doesn't let go. Onoda begins to cling to the back of Midosuji's bike and is tricked into running off the road by Midosuji. Onoda refuses to give up and gets back on his bike. He catches up again just before Manami and Midosuji catch up to Fukutomi. Onoda, Manami, and Midosuji end in a three-way tie when they reach Fukutomi, and Onoda admits he didn't realize he was racing. This gives Manami the chills, and he tells Fukutomi that Onoda is the biggest threat there. Meanwhile Imazumi decides to change Onoda's job. He tells him their job is to cross the finish line together to win for Sohoku. Midosuji decides to try and sprint ahead, but Imazumi matches his pace and refuses to let him get ahead. Onoda, Manami, and Fukutomi also maintain the same pace, making it a five-man race to the finish with only 5 km remaining.
58	20	"Imaizumi vs. Midosuji"; Transliteration: "Imaizumi vs. Midousuji" (Japanese: 今泉vs御堂筋)	March 2, 2015
Sakamichi reaches the lead pack and joins Imaizumi, and the pair reaffirms their desire to win. Without a moment's delay, Midousuji begins his attack!
59	21	"#91"; Transliteration: "91 Ban" (Japanese: 91番)	March 9, 2015
Midousuji attacks again and again, and Imaizumi holds him back. As their battle gains speed, the race enters the Fuji Azami Line's only downhill section!
60	22	"Manami and Sakamichi"; Transliteration: "Manami to Sakamichi" (Japanese: 真波と坂道)	March 16, 2015
When Imaizumi's frame breaks during his battle against Midousuji, Manami quickly overtakes him. Realizing he cannot catch Manami himself, he entrusts Sakamichi with the soul of Sohoku. With his team's hopes on his back, Sakamichi chases Manami with his extraordinary cadence, but Manami shifts up and pulls ahead.
61	23	"The Promised Road"; Transliteration: "Yakusoku no Michi" (Japanese: 約束の道)	March 23, 2015
Entrusted with Sohoku's hopes, Sakamichi charges straight ahead. Meanwhile, Manami shifts up gear by gear as he rides for the peak.
62	24	"Winner"; Transliteration: "WINNER" (Japanese: Winner)	March 30, 2015
Sakamichi pedals to take his team's jersey to the finish line, and Manami strains to reach the peak. As both competitors ride all-out, the Inter-high comes to a close! Onoda Wins!!!

== Yowamushi Pedal: New Generation ==
The 41st Summer Inter-High has concluded, marking the departure of the third-year seniors. The remaining racers will compete in the 42nd Summer Inter-High race.

No. overall	No. in season	Title	Original airdate
63	1	"The Last Minegayama"; Transliteration: "Saigo no Minegayama" (Japanese: 最後の峰ヶ山)	January 10, 2017
64	2	"What Makishima Left Behind"; Transliteration: "Makishima ga Nokoshita Mono" (Japanese: 巻島が残したもの)	January 17, 2017
65	3	"Teshima's Ride of the Soul"; Transliteration: "Teshima, Tamashī no Hashiri" (Japanese: 手嶋、魂の走り)	January 24, 2017
66	4	"The Fastest Man on Minegayama"; Transliteration: "Minegayama de Ichiban Hayai Otoko" (Japanese: 峰ヶ山で一番速い男)	January 31, 2017
67	5	"A Different Bicycle Training Ground"; Transliteration: "Jitensha Ishu Kakutōgi-ba!!" (Japanese: 自転車異種格闘技場！！)	February 7, 2017
68	6	"Naruko vs. Midousuji"; Transliteration: "Naruko vs. Midōsuji" (Japanese: 鳴子vs御堂筋)	February 14, 2017
69	7	"The Last Meet"; Transliteration: "Saigo no Sōkō-kai" (Japanese: 最後の走行会)	February 21, 2017
70	8	"Finish Line"; Transliteration: "Gōru Rain" (Japanese: ゴールライン)	February 28, 2017
71	9	"New Sohoku, Start!"; Transliteration: "Shinsei Sōhoku, Shidō!" (Japanese: 新生総北、始動！)	March 7, 2017
72	10	"The Sugimoto Brothers' Bond"; Transliteration: "Sugimoto Kyōdai no Kizuna" (Japanese: 杉元兄弟の絆)	March 14, 2017
73	11	"Conclusion"; Transliteration: "Ketchaku" (Japanese: 決着)	March 21, 2017
74	12	"Trouble!"; Transliteration: "Toraburu!" (Japanese: トラブル！)	March 28, 2017
75	13	"1000km Again"; Transliteration: "1000km Futatabi" (Japanese: 1000km再び)	April 4, 2017
76	14	"The Ordinary Man and the Genius"; Transliteration: "Bonjin to Tensai" (Japanese: 凡人と天才)	April 11, 2017
77	15	"Koga's Goal"; Transliteration: "Kōga no Gōru" (Japanese: 古賀のゴール)	April 18, 2017
78	16	"The Second Inter-High"; Transliteration: "2-Dome no Intā Hai" (Japanese: 2度目のインターハイ)	April 25, 2017
79	17	"Start!!!"; Transliteration: "Sutāto!!!" (Japanese: スタート!!!)	May 2, 2017
80	18	"The Swelling Aoyagi"; Transliteration: "Fukuramu Aoyagi" (Japanese: ふくらむ青八木)	May 9, 2017
81	19	"Road Monster Doubashi"; Transliteration: "Kaidō Dōbashi" (Japanese: 怪道銅橋)	May 16, 2017
82	20	"Full-throttle Kaburagi"; Transliteration: "Kaburagi, Zenkai!" (Japanese: 鏑木、全開！)	May 23, 2017
83	21	"Hakone Academy High School Makes Its Move!"; Transliteration: "Hakone Gakuen, Ugoku!" (Japanese: 箱根学園、動く！)	May 30, 2017
84	22	"The Pressure of Tag #1"; Transliteration: "Zekken 1 no Puresshā" (Japanese: ゼッケン1のプレッシャー)	June 6, 2017
85	23	"Sakamichi's Pursuit"; Transliteration: "Sakamichi, Tsuigeki" (Japanese: 坂道、追撃)	June 13, 2017
86	24	"The Ride of Weeds"; Transliteration: "Zassō no Hashiri" (Japanese: 雑草の走り)	June 20, 2017
87	25	"Look Up at the Sky"; Transliteration: "Sora o Aogu (Saishūwa)" (Japanese: 空を仰ぐ（最終話）)	June 27, 2017

== Yowamushi Pedal: Glory Line ==
No. overall	No. in season	Title	Original airdate
88	1	"The Final Phase"; Transliteration: "Saishū Kyokumen e" (Japanese: 最終局面へ)	January 9, 2018
89	2	"The Two Aces!!"; Transliteration: "Futari no ēsu!!" (Japanese: 2人のエース!!)	January 16, 2018
90	3	"The Appointed Time"; Transliteration: "Yakusoku no Toki" (Japanese: 約束の時)	January 23, 2018
91	4	"Five Men's Resolve"; Transliteration: "Kakugo no Gonin" (Japanese: 覚悟の5人)	January 30, 2018
92	5	"3 Seconds Less"; Transliteration: "Kezuru San Byō" (Japanese: 削る3秒)	February 6, 2018
93	6	"Sohoku Shaken"; Transliteration: "Yuragu Souhoku" (Japanese: 揺らぐ総北)	February 13, 2018
94	7	"Footsteps of Hope"; Transliteration: "Kibō no Ashioto" (Japanese: 希望の足音)	February 20, 2018
95	8	"Second Day, Start!"; Transliteration: "Futsukame, Sutāto!!" (Japanese: 2日目、スタート!!)	February 27, 2018
96	9	"Sash of Wishes"; Transliteration: "Negai no Tasuki" (Japanese: 願いのタスキ)	March 6, 2018
97	10	"#16, Shinkai Yuto"; Transliteration: "16 Ban, Shinkai Yuto" (Japanese: 16番、新開悠人)	March 13, 2018
98	11	"Mountain King"; Transliteration: "San'nō" (Japanese: 山王)	March 20, 2018
99	12	"Fallen Hopes"; Transliteration: "Koboreochita Omoi" (Japanese: こぼれ落ちた想い)	March 27, 2018
100	13	"He Who Carries Guilt"; Transliteration: "Tsumi o Shoishi Sha" (Japanese: 罪を背負いし者)	April 2, 2018
101	14	"Heart's Wrapping, Heart's Case"; Transliteration: "Kokoro no Tsutsumi, Kokoro no Hako" (Japanese: 心のつつみ、心の函)	April 9, 2018
102	15	"The Sprint Line of Delight"; Transliteration: "Kanki no Supurintorain" (Japanese: 歓喜のスプリントライン)	April 16, 2018
103	16	"Sohoku Falls Behind"; Transliteration: "Okureru Souhoku" (Japanese: 遅れる総北)	April 23, 2018
104	17	"The Start of the Mountain"; Transliteration: "Yama no Hajimari" (Japanese: 山のはじまり)	April 30, 2018
105	18	"Naruko's Determination"; Transliteration: "Naruko no Iji" (Japanese: 鳴子の意地)	May 7, 2018
106	19	"The Approaching Peak"; Transliteration: "Chikazuku Sanchō" (Japanese: 近づく山頂)	May 14, 2018
107	20	"King of the Mountain"; Transliteration: "Sangakushō" (Japanese: 山岳賞)	May 21, 2018
108	21	"Limiter"; Transliteration: "Rimittā" (Japanese: リミッター)	May 28, 2018
109	22	"Three Powerhouses"; Transliteration: "Sannin no Tsuwamono" (Japanese: 3人の強者)	June 4, 2018
110	23	"Winner"; Transliteration: "Shōrisha" (Japanese: 勝利者)	June 11, 2018
111	24	"The Small Pass"; Transliteration: "Chīsana Tōge" (Japanese: 小さな峠)	June 18, 2018
112	25	"Their Respective Starting Lines"; Transliteration: "Sorezore no Sutātorain" (Japanese: それぞれのスタートライン)	June 25, 2018

== Yowamushi Pedal: Limit Break ==
No. overall	No. in season	Title	Original airdate
113	1	"today" Transliteration: "Saishū-bi, Sutāto‼" (Japanese: 最終日、スタート‼)	October 8, 2022
114	2	"Piranha"; Transliteration: "Pirania" (Japanese: ピラニア)	October 15, 2022
115	3	"Strength to Move Forward Together"; Transliteration: "Tomoni Susumu Chikara" (Japanese: 共に進む力)	October 22, 2022
116	4	"The Team of Two"; Transliteration: "Chīmu Futari" (Japanese: チーム2人)	October 29, 2022
117	5	"Senior"; Transliteration: "Senpai" (Japanese: 先輩)	November 5, 2022
118	6	"Masakiyo Doubashi's Inter-High"; Transliteration: "Dōbashi Masakiyo no Intāhai" (Japanese: 銅橋正清のインターハイ)	November 19, 2022
119	7	"FINAL ROAD!"; Transliteration: "Fainaru Rōdo!" (Japanese: FINAL ROAD!)	November 26, 2022
120	8	"Teshima's Order"; Transliteration: "Teshima no Ōdā" (Japanese: 手嶋のオーダー)	December 3, 2022
121	9	"Transfer Student"; Transliteration: "Tenkōsei" (Japanese: 転校生)	December 17, 2022
122	10	"Resonating Vibrations"; Transliteration: "Hibikiau Baiburēshon" (Japanese: 響きあう振動)	December 24, 2022
123	11	"The Skies Above"; Transliteration: "Aogi Mita Sora" (Japanese: 仰ぎ見た空)	January 7, 2023
124	12	"Onslaught!!"; Transliteration: "Raishū!!" (Japanese: 来襲‼)	January 14, 2023
125	13	"Yūto Shinkai's Resolve"; Transliteration: "Shinkai Yūto no Kakugo" (Japanese: 新開悠人の覚悟)	January 21, 2023
126	14	"Naruko VS Manami, a Tense Battle"; Transliteration: "Naruko tai Manami Girigiri Batoru" (Japanese: 鳴子VS真波 ギリギリバトル)	January 28, 2023
127	15	"Downhill Attacking and Defending!!"; Transliteration: "KōBō! Daunhiru!!" (Japanese: 攻防!ダウンヒル!!)	January 28, 2023
128	16	"The Naruko Super Express!!"; Transliteration: "Naruko Tokkyū!!" (Japanese: 鳴子特急!!)	February 4, 2023
129	17	"Changing the Wind Direction"; Transliteration: "Kawaru Kazamuki" (Japanese: 変わる風向き)	February 4, 2023
130	18	"Watergate Dive"; Transliteration: "Wōtāgētō Daibu" (Japanese: ウォーターゲートダイブ)	February 11, 2023
131	19	"Final Orders"; Transliteration: "Saigo no Ōdā" (Japanese: 最後のオーダー)	February 18, 2023
132	20	"At the Aquarium in May"; Transliteration: "Gogatsu no Suizokukan" (Japanese: 5月の水族館)	February 25, 2023
133	21	"Switch and Humming"; Transliteration: "Suitchi to Hanauta" (Japanese: スイッチとハナウタ)	March 4, 2023
134	22	"Voice, Deliver"; Transliteration: "Koe, Todoke" (Japanese: 声、届け)	March 11, 2023
135	23	"Kinjou, The Last Job"; Transliteration: "Kinjō, Saigo no Shigoto" (Japanese: 金城、最後の仕事)	March 18, 2023
136	24	"Their Last Sprint"; Transliteration: "Futari no Rasuto Supurinto" (Japanese: 2人のラストスプリント)	March 25, 2023
137	25	"The Man who Raised his Hands Up to the Sky"; Transliteration: "Ōzora ni Te o Ageta Mono" (Japanese: 大空に手を挙げた者)	March 25, 2023
