= ZuZu & the Supernuffs =

Animated children's television series

ZuZu & the SuperNuffs is an animated children's television series that follows the adventures of a group of alien Nuffs, who have been sent to another planet on a mission. It first aired in 2013 on KidsCo.

== Synopsis ==
A trail-blazing intergalactic radio star anxious to escape her serious life, discovers she has magical powers when five furry aliens crash land in her room.

== Development ==
ZuZu & the SuperNuffs was created by Zara & Troy Swindells-Grose, who developed the series along with producer Julie Eckersley for Matchbox Pictures Australia. KidsCo launched in 2007 and was seen in more than 100 territories worldwide. The show was dubbed in more than 16 languages, including Mandarin, Cantonese, Malaysian and Indonesian.
