= List of Go! Princess Pretty Cure episodes =

- Season 12
- Cover of the last Blu-ray volume, featuring the four Cures in their Mode Elegant Premium form.
- No. of episodes: 50

Release
- Original network: ANN (ABC)
- Original release: February 1, 2015 – January 31, 2016

Series chronology
- ← Previous; HappinessCharge PreCure! Next → Witchy Pretty Cure!

Go! Princess PreCure is the twelfth anime television series in Izumi Todo and Bandai's Pretty Cure franchise, produced by Asahi Broadcasting Corporation and Toei Animation. The series aired on TV Asahi between February 1, 2015, and January 31, 2016, replacing HappinessCharge PreCure! in its initial timeslot and was succeeded by Witchy Pretty Cure!. The opening theme song is "Miracle GO! Princess PreCure" (Miracle GO !プリンセスプリキュア, Miracle Gō! Purinsesu PuriKyua) by Karin Isobe. The first ending theme for episodes 1-25 is "Dreaming ☆ Princess PreCure" (ドリーミング☆プリンセスプリキュア, Dorīmingu☆Purinsesu Purikyua), while the second ending theme from episode 26-50 is "Yume wa Mirai e no Michi" (夢は未来への道, Dreams are the Path to the Future), both performed by Rie Kitagawa.

== Episode list ==
No.	Title	Original air date
1	"I'm a Princess? Cure Flora is Born!"; Transliteration: "Watashi ga Purinsesu? Kyua Furōra Tanjō!" (Japanese: 私がプリンセス？キュアフローラ誕生！)	February 1, 2015
Haruka Haruno, a young girl who wishes to be a princess, meets a strange boy named Kanata who encourages her dream and gives her a special charm. Ten years later, Haruka enrolls at the prestigious Noble Academy boarding school, where her new roommate, Yui Nanase, shows her around the campus. Whilst hiding in the woods over her embarrassment over revealing her dream, Haruka comes across Pafu and Aroma, two fairy siblings from the Hope Kingdom. Just then, they are approached by Close, an emissary from the evil Dys Dark organization, who traps Yui's dream of becoming an author in a Gate of Desperation to create a monster known as a Zetsuborg. As Haruka becomes determined to protect Yui's dream, her charm turns into a Dress Up Key, which Haruka uses with the Princess Perfume the fairies brought with them to become the Princess Pretty Cure, Cure Flora. Using her new powers, Haruka manages to defeat the Zetsuborg and rescue Yui. Afterwards, Pafu and Aroma reveal they were sent in search of the Princess Pretty Cure by Kanata, who is revealed to be the Prince of the Hope Kingdom.
2	"The Academy's Princess! Cure Mermaid Appears!"; Transliteration: "Gakuen no Purinsesu! Tōjō Kyua Māmeido!" (Japanese: 学園のプリンセス！登場キュアマーメイド！)	February 8, 2015
Pafu and Aroma explain to Haruka that they got separated from Kanata after the Hope Kingdom was attacked by Dys Dark, led by a witch named Dyspear, entrusted with finding the three Princess Pretty Cures who possess the Dress Up Keys. As Haruka decides to train hard to become a proper princess, student council president Minami Kaido finds a Dress Up Key washed up on the beach. After observing Minami's graceful elegance, Haruka asks her to teach her how to do ballet so that she can become more princess-like. Despite the strictness of the lessons, Haruka continues to work hard, only to end up spraining her ankle whilst attempting an advanced move. While treating her injury, Minami confesses that she is far from perfect, only possessing her ballet skills from training hard as a kid, expressing her joy that someone asked her for lessons. Later, as Close targets a boy yearning to be a soccer star to create a Trophy Zetsuborg, Minami spots Haruka transforming into Cure Flora as she goes to fight against it. With Haruka's sprained ankle leaving her at a disadvantage, Minami's desire to protect her gives her the ability to transform into Cure Mermaid and defeat the Zetsuborg. Just as Haruka and Minami are about to celebrate their new partnership, Pafu and Aroma discover that the third Princess Perfume in their possession has gone missing.
3	"Goodbye Already? You Can't Keep Pafu!"; Transliteration: "Mō Sayonara? Pafu o Katte wa Ikemasen!" (Japanese: もうさよなら？パフを飼ってはいけません！)	February 15, 2015
While Minami works with Pafu and Aroma to find the missing Princess Perfume, Haruka joins the rest of the freshmen in cleaning the dorms. However, Pafu gets discovered by the dorm supervisor, Reiko Kisaragi, who states that pets can't be kept in the dorm. After studying the rules, which requires every student to agree in order to implement a new rule, Minami gives Haruka one week to unanimously convince the other students to let Pafu stay in the dorms. Over the week, Haruka manages to use Pafu's charms to convince almost everyone, with the exception of Kisaragi, who doesn't get along well with dogs. Before Haruka can think of a solution, Dys Dark's second emissary, Shut, targets a karate practitioner to create a Karate Zetsuborg. As the Cures fight against the Zetsuborg, Pafu leads Kisaragi to safety, only to run into Close wielding his own Zetsuborg. Pafu risks herself to protect Kisaragi until Haruka and Minami arrive and defeat both Zetsuborgs. Thankful for Pafu's efforts, Kisaragi makes the vote to keep her unanimous, allowing her to stay in the dorms. Meanwhile, another student in the dorms is seen with the missing Princess Perfume on her desk.
4	"Sparkling Kirara is Cure Twinkle?"; Transliteration: "Kirakira Kirara wa Kyua Tuinkuru?" (Japanese: キラキラきららはキュアトゥインクル？)	February 22, 2015
Haruka and Minami discover that Kirara Amanogawa, a fashion model who has also enrolled at Noble Academy, has the missing Princess Perfume in her possession. Curious as to if she is the third Pretty Cure, Haruka and Minami go into the city where Kirara is working to try and talk to her. However, they are interrupted when Close appears with a Camera Zetsuborg, which the Cures quickly defeat. Before the Cures can properly explain themselves, Kirara just straight up returns the Princess Perfume and leaves. Convinced that she is still potentially a Pretty Cure, Haruka and Minami go to her fashion show, where Haruka gets to know about Kirara and her dreams. As Kirara goes out wearing a Dress Up Key she found, Close targets another model to create a Fashion Zetsuborg. Determined to protect her show, Kirara stands up to the Zetsuborg and gains the power to become Cure Twinkle, allowing her to defeat the Zetsuborg. After the battle, however, Kirara returns the Princess Perfume yet again, stating she is too busy to become a Pretty Cure.
5	"The Three of Us are Go! We are the Princess Pretty Cures!"; Transliteration: "Sannin de Gō! Watashi-tachi Purinsesu Purikyua!" (Japanese: 3人でGO！私たちプリンセスプリキュア！)	March 1, 2015
As Haruka remains determined to make Kirara be part of Princess Pretty Cure, Kirara decides to show her just how busy her schedule is by taking her along with her. Following an afternoon packed with lessons, photoshoots, and meetings, Kirara explains that she is working hard to surpass her supermodel mother, Stella. Later, as Kirara struggles with an audition, Haruka helps her put together an outfit that resembles the sparkling nature of Cure Twinkle's outfit, impressing the fussy judge. The next day, as Haruka comes to understand her busy schedule and gives up trying to recruit her, Kirara starts to feel somewhat left out and unable to focus. When Close attacks with a Scientist Zetsuborg, Kirara, after learning she has passed her order, comes to Haruka and Minami's aid, having found something just as important as pursuing her dream. Helping the others to defeat the Zetsuborg, Kirara decides to double her efforts in becoming both a supermodel and a Pretty Cure, and the three become closer friends.
6	"Lesson Start! Aim to be a Grand Princess!"; Transliteration: "Ressun Sutāto! Mezase Guran Purinsesu!" (Japanese: レッスンスタート！めざせグランプリンセス！)	March 8, 2015
With the Cures gathered together, Aroma announces that the girls must aim to become Grand Princesses, using the Princess Lesson Pad to call forth a fairy teacher named Miss Shamour. While Minami and Kirara show good promise in tea party etiquette, Haruka struggles to live up to the princess she admired in her storybooks. After their lessons, the girls are contacted by Kanata, who explains how Dys Dark took over the Hope Kingdom and trapped the dreams of all of its citizens. To fight this, Kanata instructs the girls to find the nine remaining Dress Up Keys, which spread across Earth when Dys Dark attacked, and use their power to become Grand Princesses. Their discussion is soon interrupted by the arrival of Dys Dark's third emissary, Lock, who brings out a Baseball Zetsuborg. Using the courage Kanata gave her, Haruka manages to prove her worth and defeat the Zetsuborg.
7	"Reunited by Tennis! The Bully Boy!?"; Transliteration: "Tenisu de Saikai! Ijiwaru na Otoko no Ko!?" (Japanese: テニスで再会！いじわるな男の子！？)	March 15, 2015
As part of a mixed sports tournament being held at Noble Academy, Haruka is participating in a doubles tennis tournament alongside Yuki Aihara, who she soon remembers as a student from kindergarten who used to pick on her because of her dreams of being a princess. Their relationship doesn't improve as Yuki refuses to teach Haruka, who has no tennis experience, stating he will do everything himself. Angered by this, Haruka starts taking tennis lessons from Miss Shamour, with Minami and Kirara soon helping with her training. After managing to improve considerably, Haruka comes to realise how serious Yuki takes tennis himself. On the day of the tournament, Haruka and Yuki's match is interrupted when Shut targets Yuki and creates a Tennis Zetsuborg. Understanding how hard Yuki is trying to accomplish his dream, Haruka manages to hold her own before the other Cures help her defeat the Zetsuborg. Having briefly seen Cure Flora after being rescued, Yuki has newfound respect for Haruka's dream, though he is still prone to arguing with her.
8	"Absolutely Impossible!? Haruka's Dress Making!"; Transliteration: "Zettai Muri!? Haruka no Doresu Zukuri!" (Japanese: ぜったいムリ！？はるかのドレスづくり！)	March 22, 2015
Hearing about the upcoming Noble Party, Haruka decides to try her hand at making her own dress under Miss Shamour's instruction. While managing to come up with a design, Haruka struggles with the sewing aspect. When her grades start slipping as a result, Haruka is told by Minami to stop making the dress and focus on her studies, but Haruka instead decides to try and work extra hard to accomplish both. Overworking herself enough as it is, Haruka feels compelled to remake her dress from scratch after Pafu spills some tea on it, prompting worry from Kirara, who feels she can't do it alone with the time she has left. After hearing from Minami about how Haruka is working hard to accomplish her dream with her own power, Kirara tries not to involve Haruka when Lock appears with an Oven Zetsuborg. However, Haruka steps in anyway, stating that despite how tired she is, she is determined to work hard for the sake of her friends. After defeating the Zetsuborg, Haruka finally finishes her dress, thanking Kirara for worrying about her.
9	"Rise the Curtain! The Long-Awaited Noble Party!"; Transliteration: "Maku yo Agare! Akogare no Nōburu Pāti!" (Japanese: 幕よあがれ！憧れのノーブルパーティ！)	March 29, 2015
The day of the Noble Party arrives, with Minami working extra hard to keep things organized. While Haruka feels somewhat guilty for just having fun, Minami assures her this is something she is striving to do herself. When the power suddenly goes off in the hall, Minami goes to investigate and is confronted by Close, who quickly discovers that Minami has phasmophobia (fear of ghosts) and takes advantage of that with his Camera Zetsuborg. Learning about Minami's fear from her friends, Haruka and Kirara go to help her, with Haruka giving Minami the courage to face her fears and defeat the Zetsuborg. After the party resumes, Minami decides to dance with Haruka as thanks for her help.
10	"Where Is It? A New Dress Up Key!"; Transliteration: "Doko Doko? Aratana Doresu Appu Kī!" (Japanese: どこどこ？新たなドレスアップキー！)	April 5, 2015
Kanata informs the girls of a Dress-Up Key located somewhere on Noble Academy's campus in a "place where dreams are overflowing". Hearing rumors that the dorm mother, Shirogane, possesses a unique key herself, Haruka and the others follow her through a secret passageway leading to a beautiful rose garden. There, they come across a windmill where Shirogane has kept plaques of all the graduated students' dreams, which shine when Shirogane uses her key to open up the windows. Just as the Dress-Up Keys react to the dreams, Close suddenly appears and uses all the graduates' dreams to turn the windmill into a Zetsuborg, trapping Shirogane inside. Discovering Yui has followed them, the girls reveal their identities as Pretty Cures in order to protect her. Although Haruka's purifying attack initially fails, the Cures' remain determined to protect the captured dreams and combine their powers to defeat the Zetsuborg, receiving new Elegant Dress-Up Keys in the process. As Dyspear suddenly appears before Close and the Cures, Kanata prepares to send some magical items to the Cures.
11	"Big Big Big Trouble!? Pretty Cure vs. Close!"; Transliteration: "Dai Dai Dai Pinchi!? Purikyua tai Kurōzu!" (Japanese: 大大大ピンチ！？プリキュアVSクローズ！)	April 12, 2015
Deciding to give Close one final chance, Dyspear transports everyone to an alternate dimension, sending Zetsuborgs after Minami, Kirara, and Yui, while Close, unleashing his power, fights against Haruka. The Cures attempt to use their Elegant Keys, but find they don't work with their Princess Perfume. Meanwhile, Kanata informs Yui, Pafu, and Aroma about the magical items, the Crystal Princess Rods, to which Yui decides to help out. Minami and Kirara defeat their opponents and join Haruka, but still struggle against Close, who transforms into a more sinister form. Even after Yui relays Kanata's message to focus on their dreams, the Cures are unable to get the power of their dreams past Close. Just as Haruka is about to lose all hope, Yui steps in to help her and encourage the Cures to keep protecting everyone's dreams and call forth the Crystal Princess Rods, which they use with the Elegant Keys to defeat Close and return home.
12	"Kirara and the Idol! The Ho~t Donut Battle!"; Transliteration: "Kirara to Aidoru! Atsu~i Dōnattsu Batoru!" (Japanese: きららとアイドル！あつ～いドーナッツバトル！)	April 19, 2015
As Yui decides to help the Cures in any way she can, Kirara is offered a gig as a television reporter trying new flavors of donuts. However, the show's regular reporter, Ranko Ichijou, is less than pleased about working alongside Kirara and keeps trying to hog the limelight for herself. The two reporters are put in a battle to decide who gets to sample a new flavor. After Ranko wins a mascot design contest and Kirara wins a reporting contest, they are both pitted against each other in a race dressed as the mascots they designed. Kirara wins the race, but Ranko's determined to keep going even after falling at the finish line, which inspires the crowd. Just then, Shut targets Ranko and creates a Donut Zetsuborg, whose doughy texture proves challenging. However, using the Crystal Princess Rods, the Cures manage to defeat the Zetsuborg. Afterwards, Kirara has newfound respect for Ranko, who turns out to be one of her upperclassmen.
13	"A Cold Timbre...! The Black Princess Appears!"; Transliteration: "Tsumetai Neiro...! Kuroki Purinsesu Arawaru!" (Japanese: 冷たい音色・・・！黒きプリンセス現る！)	April 26, 2015
Haruka becomes interested in the violin after coming across a mysterious masked girl and comes to admire her violin playing. Minami takes Haruka to meet her violin instructor, who gives her a violin of her own, which was the first one he ever made. After struggling to play under Miss Shamour's instruction, Haruka once again comes across the masked violinist, who teaches her how to play. The next day however, Haruka and the others discover the masked violinist is actually Dyspear's daughter, Princess Twilight, who uses her own Dark Dress-Up Key to power up Shut, who in turn target's Minami's instructor to create a powered-up Violin Zetsuborg. Despite their opponent being stronger than usual, the Cures manage to defeat the Zetsuborg, after which Haruka manages to play the violin from her own heart.
14	"The Form of Love! Haruno Family's Dream!"; Transliteration: "Daisuki no Katachi! Haruno Famirī no Yume!" (Japanese: 大好きのカタチ！春野ファミリーの夢！)	May 3, 2015
Noble Academy prepares for Family Day, in which the students' families are invited on campus, with Haruka eager to see both her parents and her little sister Momoka. To her shock, however, Haruka finds that Momoka seems to show little interest in the school and is acting coldly towards Haruka and her friends. When Haruka scolds her for being rude to her friends, Momoka lashes out at her and runs off, with Minami theorising that she may be lonely due to living apart from her big sister. Kirara manages to catch up to Momoka and assure her that Haruka still cares about her dearly, allowing the two sisters to make up. Just then, Twilight and Shut appear and target Haruka's family to create a Dorayaki Zetsuborg. Finding a handmade tiara that Momoka had made for her, Haruka finds the strength to stand up to the Zetsuborg and defeat it, determined to do her best with her family's support.
15	"The Great Transformation Roma! Aroma's Butler Exam!"; Transliteration: "Daihenshin ~roma! Aroma no Shitsuji Shiken!" (Japanese: 大変身ロマ！アロマの執事試験！)	May 10, 2015
Aroma is revealed to be an apprentice who is learning to become Kanata's butler but has been failing his exams. Transformed into human form by Miss Shamour's magic, Aroma is asked to retake his exam by serving as Haruka's butler for the day, while Pafu, also given a human form, learns to become a maid. After a day of keeping Haruka to a hectic schedule, Aroma becomes upset when Miss Shamour fails him, saying he doesn't understand the most important thing about being a butler. Running off in tears, Aroma is saved from an oncoming vehicle by another butler named Oikawa, who shows him that what's important for a butler is to consider his master's feelings. Just then, Oikawa protects his master from Lock and Twilight, who use him to summon a Butler Zetsuborg. As Haruka struggles against the Zetsuborg, Aroma rushes to get the others to come to her aid in the nick of time. After the Zetsuborg is defeated, Aroma comes to understand the importance of respecting his master's feelings and decides to restart his butler training anew.
16	"An Oath to the Sea! Minami's Most Important Treasure!"; Transliteration: "Umi e no Chikai! Minami no Taisetsu na Takaramono!" (Japanese: 海への誓い！みなみの大切な宝物！)	May 17, 2015
The girls visit a seaside resort owned by Minami's older brother, Wataru, where they meet Minami's dolphin friend, Tina, and learn more about her aspirations to carry on the family business. Pained by the bonds shared between Minami and her brother, Twilight has Lock target Wataru to create an Orca Zetsuborg, while Shut creates Octopus Zetsuborg to fight against Haruka and Kirara, who learn of a Dress-Up Key nearby. As Minami struggles against the Orca Zetsuborg, she is protected by Tina, who once saved her life when she was young. Determined to save Tina, Minami awakens the power of the Bubble Miracle Dress-Up Key, allowing her to heal Tina's injuries and help the Cures defeat both Zetsuborgs.
17	"Too Bright! Kirara's Runway of Dreams!"; Transliteration: "Mabushi Sugiru! Kirara, Yume no Ranwei!" (Japanese: まぶしすぎる！きらら、夢のランウェイ！)	May 24, 2015
Kirara is given the opportunity to appear on the runway with her mother, Stella, who appears to be a lot more erratic off stage. Following rehearsals, during which Kirara gets very nervous about living up to her mother, Stella invites everyone to their home, where Kirara gets angry at her for not taking tomorrow's performance seriously. On the day of the performance, Twilight and Shut appear and target Stella to create a mother-daughter pair of Model Zetsuborgs, leading Kirara to realise that everything her mother was doing was to relieve her stress. Relieved to find her mother has the same dream as her, Kirara awakens the power of the Shooting Star Miracle Dress-Up Key and defeats the Zetsuborgs. After performing on stage together, Stella tells Kirara about her next dream: to become top models together.
18	"The Picture Book's Secret! What is a Princess?"; Transliteration: "Ehon no Himitsu! Purinsesu tte Naani?" (Japanese: 絵本のヒミツ！プリンセスってなぁに？)	May 31, 2015
Haruka and Yui learn that Yume Mochizuki, the author of Haruka's favorite book, The Flower Princess, is holding an autograph session. Upon meeting Yume, Haruka becomes downhearted upon hearing that she has no plans to continue the story. Yume explains this is because so many fans had different ideas for the princess' future that she felt it more appropriate to leave things to the reader's imagination. Just then, Twilight appears, trapping everyone in glass mirrors in order to draw power from their despair. Overwhelming the Cures with her power, Twilight attempts to burn Haruka's book but Haruka protects it, believing in Yume's words to try to become her own princess and awakening the Lily Miracle Dress-Up Key. Combining her new power with Minami and Kirara's new keys, Haruka and the Cures beat Twilight back with the Trinity Explosion attack. Later, it is revealed that Yume is also the principal of Noble Academy.
19	"Discovered~! The Treasure Found in the Dormitory!"; Transliteration: "Hakke~n! Ryō de Mitsuketa Takaramono!" (Japanese: はっけ～ん！寮でみつけたタカラモノ！)	June 7, 2015
After Miss Shamour tells the girls about Kanata's younger sister, Hope Kingdom's princess, student vice-president Seira Azuma holds a treasure hunt, in which the students are split into teams to search for a treasure hidden in the girl's dorms. As the girls spend time with their different teams, they learn about how much they've changed over the past few months, which turns out to be the treasure they were searching for. Just then, Shut attacks with a Rice Cooker Zetsuborg, but the Cures manage to defeat it in order to protect their beloved dorm. Meanwhile, Twilight finds herself drawn towards the Hope Kingdom, where she comes across a bottle of Princess Perfume.
20	"Reunited with Kanata!? Onwards to the Hope Kingdom!"; Transliteration: "Kanata to Saikai!? Iza, Hōpu Kingudamu e!" (Japanese: カナタと再会！？いざ、ホープキングダムへ！)	June 14, 2015
Bringing the Princess Perfurme to Dyspear, Twilight receives a new Black Key to use with it. This causes a reaction in the Dress-Up Keys, which teleport Haruka and the others to the Hope Kingdom. Separated from the others, Haruka follows the light shining from her key and comes across Kanata while encountering some Zetsuborgs. Each of the girls are guided by their keys to a corresponding building, where they are greeted by the Princess Pretty Cures of the past, who warn them about the fourth Princess Perfume being used for darkness. As the Cures head towards Hope Kingdom's palace, Minami and Kirara are briefly stopped in their tracks by Shut and Lock respectively, while Haruka hears about Kanata's sister, Towa, who suddenly went missing one day. After everyone assembles at the palace, they are confronted by Twilight, who Kanata recognises as Towa. Rejecting such claims, Twilight uses the Princess Perfume, transforming into the Black Princess.
21	"Deliver These Feelings! Princess vs. Princess!"; Transliteration: "Omoi yo Todoke! Purinsesu tai Purinsesu!" (Japanese: 想いよ届け！プリンセスVSプリンセス！)	June 28, 2015
Determined to bring Towa back to her normal self before the black keys consume her, the Cures fight against the powered up Twilight, who fights back with her own Elegant Mode. Dyspear taunts Kanata, telling how she took advantage of Towa's desire to become Grand Princess to lure her to her side and bring despair to the Hope Kingdom, erasing her memories and turning her into Twilight. Despite the overwhelming odds, Haruka judges from Twilight's violin playing that there is still hope left, combining the Cures' power with Kanata's violin playing to reawaken Towa's memories and return her to normal. As Dyspear attacks in anger, Kanata stays behind to help the girls escape with Towa back to the real world.
22	"The Fire of Hope! Her Name is Cure Scarlet!!"; Transliteration: "Kibō no Honō! Sono Na wa Kyua Sukāretto!!" (Japanese: 希望の炎！その名はキュアスカーレット！！)	July 5, 2015
After Towa wakes up at Noble Academy, Haruka tries to give her Kanata's violin, but she feels she isn't worthy of. Just then, they are both confronted by Dyspear, who is determined to bring Towa back to her side, trapping her in a tower of vines in order to draw power from her despair. As Minami and Kirara hold off Dyspear, Haruka breaks into the vine tower to rescue Towa, using the words Kanata gave her to encourage her dream. As the two girls combine their violin playing, combining into a single melody, Towa's black keys transform into new Dress-Up Keys, transforming her into the fourth Princess Pretty Cure, Cure Scarlet. Using Kanata's violin, which transforms into the Scarlet Violin, Towa manages to force Dyspear to retreat before assuring Haruka that Kanata is still alive somewhere.
23	"Together Forever! The Four of Us are Princess PreCure!"; Transliteration: "Zū~tto Issho! Watashi-tachi Yonin de Purinsesu Purikyua!" (Japanese: ず～っと一緒！私たち4人でプリンセスプリキュア！)	July 12, 2015
Haruka and the others take Towa on a tour of the city, showing her all of the delights it has to offer. Despite seeming to have fun, Towa feels she shouldn't be allowed to enjoy herself until Hope Kingdom is saved and goes off on her own. Meanwhile, Lock is tasked by Dyspear to gather despair energy while she recovers her power. As Towa quickly finds herself struggling to fit in with Earth's customs, she is approached by Yume, who shows her the importance of keeping your heart filled with warm things. Just then, Lock appears and targets Yume to create a Crystal Zetsuborg, using an additional lock to power it up with Yume's despair. As Towa struggles to fight the Zetsuborg on her own, she is assisted by the other Cures, showing her the power of warm feelings and helping her defeat the Zetsuborg. As Lock uses the despair he's gathered so far to enter a new form, the girls are brought to meet Yume, who reveals herself as the principal and makes Towa an official student of Noble Academy.
24	"A Stiff Smile? My Roommate is a Princess!"; Transliteration: "Egao ga Katai? Rūmumeito wa Purinsesu!" (Japanese: 笑顔がカタイ？ルームメイトはプリンセス！)	July 19, 2015
Towa, who is enrolled into Noble Academy under the name Towa Akagi, is put in the same room as Kirara. On top of trying to teach Towa to learn how to do things without servants, Kirara's workload is increased when she gets the chance to be a regular model on a new fashion magazine. While juggling all of this, Kirara grows concerned that her smiles are becoming forced. After stumbling across a serene pond nearby, Kirara teaches Towa what it means to smile, realising what she herself had forgotten in the process. With both girls feeling refreshed, the two team up to take down a Fashion Zetsuborg created by Lock.
25	"To Haruka's Home! Our First Sleepover!"; Transliteration: "Haruka no Ouchi e! Hajimete no Otomarikai!" (Japanese: はるかのおうちへ！はじめてのおとまり会！)	July 26, 2015
With the arrival of summer vacation, the girls go over to Haruka's house for a sleepover, which is a first for both Minami and Towa. During their stay, the girls participate in various activities, such as helping out at Haruka's restaurant, catching nagashi somen, and spitting watermelon seeds. Later, as Towa is troubled by bad dreams about Dyspear, Minami stays with her to alleviate some of her fears. Just then, Shut appears with a Fireman Zetsuborg, spreading dark fog to heighten Towa's fears, but Minami stands by her and helps to defeat the Zetsuborg.
26	"Rescue Lady Towa! Fight, Royal Fairies!"; Transliteration: "Towa-sama o Sukue! Tatakau Roiyaru Fearī!" (Japanese: トワ様を救え！戦うロイヤルフェアリー！)	August 2, 2015
Returning to Noble Academy with the fairies, Towa suddenly comes down with a fever. With the other girls still with family and work and no one else at the academy, Aroma goes off to obtain some herb tea from Miss Shamour, while Pafu is left alone to try and look after Towa. As the other girls try to return as quickly as possible, Shut appears with a small Cicada Zetsuborg, prompting Pafu to try and fight it off herself to keep Towa safe, shortly joined by Aroma. When the Zetsuborg grows into a larger form, Pafu and Aroma's desire to protect Towa causes them to gain new transformations which restore Towa and the others to full health, allowing them to take down the Zetsuborg with assistance from the fairies.
27	"Go For It, Yuki! Echoing Support at the Summer Festival!"; Transliteration: "Ganbare Yūki! Ōen Hibiku Natsumatsuri!" (Japanese: ガンバレゆうき！応援ひびく夏祭り！)	August 9, 2015
As the girls enjoy the sights of the Yumegahama Summer Festival, Haruka becomes concerned when Yuki seems more focused on enjoying the festival than preparing for the tennis club's training camp. She soon learns from Yuki's fangirls that Yuki injured his elbow during practise, leading him to be convinced that he won't be able to play in the upcoming tournament. As Yuki remains defiant about accepting any support, the fangirls are targeted by Shut, who creates Cheerleader Zetsuborgs. While the other Cures fight, Haruka hears about Yuki's frustration over his injury, firmly telling him not to turn away those who still support him. Realising his own folly, Yuki uses his healthy arm to assist the Cures in taking the Zetsuborgs down. Afterwards, Yuki apologises to those he insulted, who encourage him to just try his hardest.
28	"Our Hearts Are Together! The Sunlight That Shines on the Pretty Cure!"; Transliteration: "Kokoro wa Issho! Purikyua o Terasu Taiyō no Hikari!" (Japanese: 心は一緒！プリキュアを照らす太陽の光！)	August 16, 2015
The girls all go to the beach, where Towa seems to be insistent on doing activities other than swimming. Unable to tell the others that she can't swim, Towa is joined by Yui, who expresses how envious she is of her being able to help everyone, but still feels content with being with everyone. Just then, Lock appears and targets Yui to create a Sketchbook Zetsuborg to attack Towa, while also sending clones of himself to attack the other Cures. Understanding the importance of being around everyone, Towa manages to defeat the Zetsuborg and rescue Yui, whose notebook brings forth a new Dress-Up Key, the Sun Key. Later that night, Haruka and the others are shocked to discover that Lock had managed to steal all of their Dress-up Keys during their fight.
29	"Mysterious Girls? The Bequeathed Legendary Key!"; Transliteration: "Fushigi na Onnanoko? Uke Tsugareshi Densetsu no Kī!" (Japanese: ふしぎな女の子？受けつがれし伝説のキー！)	August 23, 2015
As the girls lament losing their keys, Pafu has a dream and starts sensing the scent of the keys. While trying to pursue Pafu, Haruka, Minami, and Kirara end up following some mysterious girls to a hidden garden, where they are holding a tea party. Meanwhile, Lock uses the captured Dress-Up Keys to draw despair from the dreams stored inside. When a giant Zetsuborg comes to attack the girls, Haruka and the others decide to face the enemy despite being unable to transform. Seeing their strengths, the three other girls give them temporary Dress-Up Keys, allowing them to once again transform and defeat the Zetsuborg. Afterwards, the three other girls reveal themselves to be the previous Princess Pretty cures, who had pulled the girls into their dreams, encouraging the girls to stand up to the power of darkness before leaving them with the Sakura, Coral, and Galaxy Dress-Up Keys. Meanwhile, Lock uses the despair he had gathered to transform Hope Kingdom's castle into a giant Zetsuborg, which he sends to attack the human world.
30	"To the Future! The Crystal of Power, Princess Palace!"; Transliteration: "Mirai e! Chikara no Kesshō, Purinsesu Paresu!" (Japanese: 未来へ！チカラの結晶、プリンセスパレス！)	August 30, 2015
While Towa protects Yui and the school from the Zetsuborg's attacks, Haruka and the others venture inside it in order to recover their keys. There, they come face to face with Lock, who vows to become the world's ruler in Dyspear's place. With Pafu's help, Haruka manages to use her new key to free the others, allowing everyone to transform again. Just then, Lock uses the remaining despair in the castle to transform himself into a powerful toad. However, all of the Cures' keys combine their powers to transform the castle into the Princess Palace, allowing the Cures to enter new Dress-Up Premium forms and defeat Lock, whose despair energy is taken by a crow.
31	"The New Semester! A New Dream and A New Threat!"; Transliteration: "Shin Gakki! Aratana Yume to Aratanaru Kyōi!" (Japanese: 新学期！新たな夢と新たなる脅威！)	September 6, 2015
At the start of the second semester, mysterious dark seeds start planting themselves across the city. Meanwhile, as Miss Shamour looks after Lock, who had reverted to the form of a fairy following his defeat, Haruka befriends her classmate, Hanae, who had been tending to the school's gardens, encouraging her to become a flower coordinator. Just then, the girls are confronted by Close, who had managed to revive himself using the despair energy he took from Lock. Close creates two new henchmen, Stop and Freeze, and has them target Hanae to create a Flower Zetsuborg, though the Cures manage to defeat it with the Princess Palace. After leaving the Cures with a foreboding message, Close uses the despair energy he had gathered to reawaken Dyspear.
32	"Minami's Fiance!? The Come Back Super Celeb!"; Transliteration: "Minami no Īnazuke!? Kaettekita Sūpā Serebu!" (Japanese: みなみの許嫁！？帰ってきたスーパーセレブ！)	September 13, 2015
Kimimaro Ijuin, Minami's childhood friend and self-proclaimed fiancé, comes to Noble Academy to visit Minami, much to her dismay. Noticing Minami seems to have changed from his idealized version of her, Kimimaro tells Haruka to stay away from her, claiming that she is a bad influence. This angers Minami, who scolds Kimimaro for not considering other people's feelings. Just then, Stop and Freeze target Kimimaro to create a Groom Zetsuborg. Haruka, having taken Kimimaro's words to heart, rushes to prove herself worth to stand by Minami, but Minami encourages her to be herself and not let others decide her worth. Overcoming her troubles, Haruka joins Minami and the others in defeating the Zetsuborg. Afterwards, Kimimaro apologises to Haruka and Minami before returning abroad.
33	"Teach me, Shamour♪ A Happy Lesson for Granting Wishes!"; Transliteration: "Oshiete Shamūru♪ Negai Kanaeru Shiawase Ressun!" (Japanese: 教えてシャムール♪願い叶える幸せレッスン！)	September 20, 2015
As Kuroro, the fairy formerly known as Lock, awakens from his slumber, Miss Shamour decides to take time off her lessons to look after him. The girls follow Shamour as she takes the shy Kuroro around the city, meeting up with a group of cats. Noticing the calico cats and black cats arguing with each other, Shamour decides to hold a fashion contest between the two groups, with Kuroro acting as the representative of the calico cats and the girls offering their fashion sense to each team. Just then, Shut appears, summoning some Fish Zetsuborgs that the Cures have trouble fighting seriously. Noticing Shut's rushed makeup, Shamour steps in to give him a proper makeover, stating that a princess' job is to make everyone smile, which also gives the Cures encouragement to defeat the Zetsuborgs. Shamour's lessons encourage Kuroro to learn as much as he can to take back to the Hope Kingdom, while the cats give Haruka a crest belonging to Kanata, hinting that he is nearby.
34	"Too Much Trouble~! Haruka's Princess Contest!"; Transliteration: "Pinchi Sugiru~! Haruka no Purinsesu Kontesuto!" (Japanese: ピンチすぎる～！はるかのプリンセスコンテスト！)	September 27, 2015
After doing some fortune telling to determine Kanata's whereabouts, the girls learn of a Princess Contest where the winner gets to meet a prince. As Haruka enters the contest and makes it past the first round, Kirara teaches her how to walk like a model for the next round. On the day of the contest, as Haruka is given a dress that's too big for her, Kirara gets held up when Stop and Freeze target her makeup artist to create a Makeup Zetsuborg. As Minami and Towa join Kirara in fighting the Zetsuborg, Haruka uses what she had learned from Kirara to figure out a solution to her dress problem, remembering that a natural smile is more important than any makeup and managing to walk the stage with pride before joining the others in defeating the Zetsuborg. After Haruka manages to win one of the prizes in the contest, she spots someone resembling Kanata in town.
35	"Meeting at Last...! Kanata and the Lost Memory!"; Transliteration: "Yatto Aeta...! Kanata to Ushinawareta Kioku!" (Japanese: やっと会えた・・・！カナタと失われた記憶！)	October 4, 2015
The girls find Kanata working at the violin shop, only to discover he has lost all of his memories upon being found by the owner two weeks ago. They try to help Kanata regain his memories by revealing their Pretty Cure powers and playing the violin, but to no avail. Wanting to bring him to a familiar place, Haruka takes Kanata to the hill in her hometown where they first met years ago, but he is still unable to remember anything. As Haruka wonders if she is only hurting Kanata, Stop and Freeze target one of the local children to create a Princess Zetsuborg. While fighting the Zetsuborg, Haruka gives Kanata her thanks to being able to protect people's dreams. Although Kanata still doesn't remember anything, Haruka feels that he is still Kanata even without his memories, and they start their friendship from scratch.
36	"The Tearful Heart...! The Thing Minami Wants to Protect!"; Transliteration: "Namidatsu Kokoro...! Minami no Mamoritai Mono!" (Japanese: 波立つ心・・・！みなみの守りたいもの！)	October 11, 2015
Minami's family invites the gang aboard their cruise ship, where Minami meets a girl named Asuka Kitakaze who works as a vet at the local aquarium. Asuka shows Minami and the others around as she checks up on the animals, suggesting Minami is suited for this line of work. Later at a party, Minami learns that Asuka is a marine biology expert who has been approached about joining the Kaido group, but declined in order to remain free and keep following her own dream of understanding the ocean. Just then, Stop and Freeze target Asuka to create a Penguin Zetsuborg, with Minami stepping in to protect the ship from harm. After the Cures defeat the Zetsuborg, Asuka encourages Minami to keep pursuing her dream.
37	"Haruka is the Star!? A Nonsensical Romantic Play!"; Transliteration: "Haruka ga Shuyaku!? Hachamecha Roman na Engekikai!" (Japanese: はるかが主役！？ハチャメチャロマンな演劇会！)	October 18, 2015
Haruka is chosen to star in a class play of Romeo and Juliet alongside her classmate Hirano, but has trouble appeasing the director, Furuya, who wants to properly convey Juliet's words to the audience. As Haruka frets about how to portray Juliet, Kanata tells her she is a lot like Juliet to begin with and helps with her practice. On the day of the play, Stop and Freeze target both Hirano and Furuya to create Director and Actor Zetsuborgs, giving the Cures 70 seconds before they set off a bomb. However, Haruka's determination to protect everyone's special day allows Minami to stop the bomb just in time, allowing the Cures to defeat the Zetsuborgs. With Hirano injured from his encounter, Kanata offers to take his place as Romeo, but Haruka feels their play should just star their class, helping Hirano to carry out his role in spite of his injury.
38	"A Suspicious Trap...! The Lonely Princess!"; Transliteration: "Ayashī Wana...! Hitoribotchi no Purinsesu!" (Japanese: 怪しいワナ・・・！ひとりぼっちのプリンセス！)	October 25, 2015
Haruka is approached by a male student named Kurosu, who seems to be very supportive of everyone's dreams. With Minami and Kirara doing their own business and Yui invited to a picture book exhibition by Kurosu, who Towa decides to follow, Haruka goes shopping with Pafu and Aroma, only for them to suddenly disappear. Following Kurosu in search of them, Haruka is shocked to find that he was Close all along, having disguised himself in order to separate Haruka from the others, while Stop and Freeze keep Towa from coming to her aid. As Haruka fights with the determination of those who support her dreams, Kanata, believing that her dream is hurting her, tells her to give up on being a princess. This leads Haruka to fall into a mental breakdown, causing the seeds Close had spread around the place to grow even further.
39	"The Moment the Flower of Dreams Blooms! Dance, Revived Princess!"; Transliteration: "Yume no Hana Hiraku Toki! Mae, Fukkatsu no Purinsesu!" (Japanese: 夢の花ひらく時！舞え、復活のプリンセス！)	November 8, 2015
With Haruka still reeling from Kanata's words, the seeds Close had spread around burst open, surrounding the city in a forest of despair and creating countless Zetsuborgs. As the other Cures go off to fight, Haruka finds she is unable to transform, further feeding the forest with despair. While Kanata, realizing that he was the one responsible, rushes to find her, Haruka thinks back to when she first desired to become a princess, the support she received from her family, and the friends she's made since enrolling at Noble Academy. Remembering all this, Haruka becomes determined not to give up becoming a princess no matter what anyone says, once again becoming able to transform and fight alongside her friends. Observing their fight, Kanata regains his memories upon finding his own dream to protect Haruka's smile, giving birth to a new Dress-Up Key that give the Cures a new power, Mode Elegant Royal, allowing them to push back the enemy and restore the city to normal.
40	"Towa's Determination! The Rainbow of Hope Shining in the Sky!"; Transliteration: "Towa no Ketsui! Sora ni Kagayaku Kibō no Niji!" (Japanese: トワの決意！空にかがやく希望の虹！)	November 15, 2015
Just as Towa becomes reacquainted with her brother, the Royal Key brings everyone to the Hope Kingdom, which has been further covered in the Forest of Despair. As Kuroro runs off after seeing the state of the kingdom, Dyspear sends a Zetsuborg clone of herself after the others. Towa, determined to rescue her parents, rushes headfirst into battle, only to get pushed back. Coming across Kuroro, Towa is reminded of her parents' words to bring hope to her citizens and regains her determination, managing to defeat the Zetsuborg with everyone's help. Uncovering the place where she found her Princess Perfume, Towa uses the Princess Palace to restores it into the Castle of Flames, restoring one of the colors of Hope Kingdom's rainbow.
41	"Yui's Dream! The Feelings are in the Canvas...!"; Transliteration: "Yui no Yume! Omoi wa Kyanbasu no Naka ni...!" (Japanese: ゆいの夢！想いはキャンバスの中に・・・！)	November 22, 2015
Yui decides to enter an art contest with the theme of smiles, but struggles with coming up with a picture she is satisfied with, worrying that so many other artists are better than her. As Yui becomes filled with more doubt, she comes across Yume holding a drawing class for some children, realising she should focus more on the fun of drawing rather than trying to win. Just then, Stop and Freeze appear and trap Yui once more to create a Sketchbook Zetsuborg. However, upon hearing the voices of her friends, Yui manages to resist the Cage of Despair's power through her own free will, weakening the Zetsuborg enough for the Cures to defeat it. Afterwards, Yui decides to do a painting showing the beauty and valour of the Cures, winning an award of excellence in the contest.
42	"Dreams or Pretty Cure!? The Shining Kirara's Chosen Road!"; Transliteration: "Yume ka Purikyua ka!? Kagayaku Kirara no Erabu Michi!" (Japanese: 夢かプリキュアか！？輝くきららの選ぶ道！)	November 29, 2015
Kirara is chosen as a main model for the Japan Collection fashion show in New York, with a rookie model named Karin Akeboshi assigned as her assistant in the meantime. While working hard both on her model work and being a Pretty Cure, Kirara hears about how Karin was inspired by her to become a model. Just as Kirara prepares to leave for New York, Stop and Freeze target Karin, who dreams of becoming an inspirational model like Kirara, to create a Model Zetsuborg. Despite the others urging her to catch her flight and follow her dream, Kirara chooses to stay in order to protect Karin's dream and defeat the Zetsuborg. As a result of missing her flight, Kirara's career takes a large hit, which seems to affect Kirara more than she lets on to her friends.
43	"The Top Star's Shine! To the Sparkling Dream Stage!"; Transliteration: "Ichiban Boshi no Kirara! Yume Kirameku Sutēji e!" (Japanese: 一番星のきらら！夢きらめくステージへ！)	December 6, 2015
Kirara makes the shocking decision to suspend her modelling career, feeling she should focus her efforts on being a Pretty Cure. Not wanting Kirara to just give up on her dream, Haruka and the others put on a surprise fashion show, where all the students show off their dream ambitions, reminding Kirara of her love of modelling and desire to pursue her dream. Dyspear creates a Dragon Zetsuborg in an attempt to stop the Cures, but Kirara's newfound determination allows her to defeat it, awakening the power of the Star Castle and restoring another color to Hope Kingdom's rainbow. Afterwards, Kirara reveals that, come Spring, she will be going to Paris to work as a model for Bauanne, receiving the full support of her friends.
44	"Bubbling Feelings! Minami's True Thoughts!"; Transliteration: "Wakiagaru Omoi! Minami no Hontō no Kimochi!" (Japanese: 湧き上がる想い！みなみの本当のキモチ！)	December 13, 2015
Ever since her encounter with Asuka, Minami has taken an interest in becoming a sea doctor, but is troubled over whether to pursue that over her original dream to succeed her family's company. Noticing her worries, Kirara brings Minami to the beach to lend an ear to her troubles. When Shut attacks with a Blackboard Zetsuborg, Minami finds herself weaker than usual as a result of her uncertainty. However, Haruka and the others give her reassurance that it is okay for people's dreams to change, encouraging her to think about what she wants to do. Deciding to pursue her new dream, Minami regains her strength and defeats the Zetsuborg, after which she tells her friends about her desire to become a sea doctor.
45	"The Feelings She Wants to Express! To the Great Ocean, Minami's Dream!"; Transliteration: "Tsutaetai Omoi! Minami no Yume yo Ōunabara e!" (Japanese: 伝えたい想い！みなみの夢よ大海原へ！)	December 20, 2015
As Noble Academy holds a Christmas party, Minami is hesitant to tell her family about the new dream she wants to pursue. Just as the others encourage Minami to call her family over to tell them properly, Shut, who has been given one final chance by Dyspear, uses the Sea Castle to summon a Turtle Zetsuborg. However, Minami's determination to protect the ocean allows her and the other Cures to defeat the Zetsuborg, restoring the Sea Castle and another part of the rainbow. Afterwards, Minami goes to meet with her family to tell them about her new dream, receiving their full support.
46	"Beautiful...!? The Wandering Shut and the Snow Castle!"; Transliteration: "Utsukushī...!? Sasurau Shatto to Yuki no Shiro!" (Japanese: 美しい・・・！？さすらうシャットと雪の城！)	December 27, 2015
The girls enjoy playing in the snow, when Towa starts making a snow castle like the one in Hope Kingdom. All of the other students soon pitch in to help build the castle, leaving Towa thankful for all the friends she has made. Shortly after the castle is completed, Shut, who feels he has nothing left after losing his last chance, becomes envious of the castle's beauty and attacks it. As Shut powers himself up to fight against the Cures, they show him just how ugly he has become. The Cures then purify Shut, who refuses to accept Towa's offer of help and leaves, while Yui gets the other students' help in repairing the snow castle.
47	"Like a Flower...! Strong, Kind, and Beautiful!"; Transliteration: "Hana no Yō ni...! Tsuyoku Yasashiku Utsukushiku!" (Japanese: 花のように・・・！つよくやさしく美しく！)	January 10, 2016
As the girls investigate a mysterious happening with the final castle, the Flower Castle, Haruka follows a bird inside the castle, trapping her inside. When she wakes up, Haruka finds she has become the Flower Princess from her book, living a life of luxury with a charming prince while slowly forgetting about who she was. Meanwhile, the others learn that this is a trap laid out by Dyspear, who plans to trap Haruka in her dream forever while sending Stop and Freeze to attack them with a Butterfly Zetsuborg. Despite initially enjoying the world she is in, Haruka soon realises there is no beauty in a dream that is granted without effort, allowing her to break free from the world Close created. With Haruka feeling strength from her dream, even if it may never end, Haruka and the others defeat the Zetsuborg and restore the Flower Castle, completing the rainbow and restoring Hope Kingdom to its former glory. Just as the Cures prepare to tackle the Door of Despair, Dyspear sets her sights on Noble Academy.
48	"The Approaching Despair...! The Princesses are in Danger!"; Transliteration: "Semaru Zetsubō...! Zettai Zetsumei no Purinsesu!" (Japanese: 迫る絶望・・・！絶体絶命のプリンセス！)	January 17, 2016
As Dyspear launches an assault on Noble Academy, turning it into her new castle, the girls are forced to reveal their secret identities to their classmates in order to head into action. While Kanata and Shamour hold off Stop and Freeze, the Cures come up against Close, who summons the remnants of Lock against them, trapping the other students in order to increase his power, allowing him to destroy the Cures' weapons. Realising the Cures are in danger, Yui breaks free from her Cage of Despair, encouraging the other students to remember their dreams and break free as well, weakening Lock in the process. Noticing that Lock is suffering under Dyspear's control, Shut steps in to remind Lock of his true self before the Cures purify him.
49	"The Decisive Battle Against Dyspear! The Grand Princesses are Born!"; Transliteration: "Kessen Disupia! Guran Purinsesu Tanjō!" (Japanese: 決戦ディスピア！グランプリンセス誕生！)	January 24, 2016
Dyspear merges with Close to achieve her true form, which proves to be too powerful for even the Cures' strongest attacks. As she starts spreading her despair across the world, Dyspear explains how she was born from the despair in the hearts of those whose dreams could not come true. Overwhelming the Cures, Dyspear sucks all the captured citizens into her Door of Despair, sending the girls into despair. However, Pafu and Aroma, along with the other students, remain hopeful and stand to protect them, the power of their dreams opening up doors that transform the Cures into Grand Princesses, giving them the strength to finally defeat Dyspear.
50	"To Our Dreams in the Far Distance! Go! Princess Pretty Cure!"; Transliteration: "Harukanaru Yume e! Gō! Purinsesu Purikyua!" (Japanese: はるかなる夢へ！Go！プリンセスプリキュア！)	January 31, 2016
Refusing to give up, Close fuses with Dyspear's remaining power to counterattack. As Haruka goes to face him alone, she comes to realise that despair, just like dreams, is an important part of life, with Close coming to understand this a little and taking his leave, but promising to return again if things fall into despair. Afterwards, the Cures unlock the Gate of Despair, freeing all of its captured souls including those of Towa and Kanata's parents and the citizens of Hope Kingdom. With their mission complete, the Dress Up Keys return into a slumber, with the girls learning that the link between their world and the Hope Kingdom will soon disappear. As such, Haruka and the others have one final get-together before Towa and the fairies return to the Hope Kingdom. As each of the girls set off on their own dreams, Haruka has one final meeting with Kanata before setting off on the path to become her ideal princess.

== See also ==
- Go! Princess Precure the Movie: Go! Go!! Splendid Triple Feature!!! - A three-part animated film feature based on the series.
- Pretty Cure All Stars: Spring Carnival♪ - The seventh Pretty Cure All Stars crossover film, which stars the Princess Pretty Cures.
