= List of Witchy Pretty Cure! episodes =

- Season 13
- Cover of the final Blu-Ray volume featuring Cure Miracle, Cure Magical, Cure Felice, and mascot Mofurun
- No. of episodes: 50

Release
- Original network: ANN (ABC)
- Original release: February 7, 2016 – January 29, 2017

Series chronology
- ← Previous; Go! Princess PreCure Next → Kirakira Pretty Cure a la Mode

Witchy Pretty Cure! is the thirteenth anime television series in Izumi Todo's Pretty Cure franchise, produced by Asahi Broadcasting Corporation and Toei Animation. The series follows a girl named Mirai Asahina and a magician named Liko Izayoi, who both attend the Magic School and become the Witchy Pretty Cure to fight against the evil Dokurokushe and the forces of Never Ending Chaos. The series aired on ABC in Japan from February 7, 2016, to January 29, 2017, replacing Go! Princess Pretty Cure in its timeslot, and was succeeded by Kirakira PreCure a la Mode. For the first 21 episodes, the opening theme song is "Dokkin Mahōtsukai PreCure!" (Dokkin♢魔法つかいプリキュア!; Dokkin' Witchy PreCure!) by Rie Kitagawa and the ending theme is "Cure Up RaPaPa! Hohoemi ni Naru Mahō" (CURE UP↑RA♡PA☆PA!～ほほえみになる魔法～; Cure Up RaPaPa! Magic That Turns Into Smiles), performed by Rie Takahashi and Yui Horie. From episode 22 onwards, the opening theme is "Dokkin Mahōtsukai PreCure! Part 2" (Dokkin♢魔法つかいプリキュア! Part 2; Dokkin' Witchy PreCure! Part 2) by Kitagawa and the ending theme is "Mahō â la Dōmo!" (魔法アラ・ドーモ!, Magic â la Thank You!) by Takahashi, Horie, and Saori Hayami. The ending theme for episodes 38 and 39 is "Tadashī Mahō no Tsukaikata" (正しい魔法の使い方, The Correct Way to Use Magic) by Mayu Watanabe, to promote the release of the movie Witchy PreCure! The Movie: Wonderous! Cure Mofurun!.

== Episode list ==
No.	Title	Original air date
1	"A Miraculous and Magical Encounter! The Magical Pretty Cures are Born!"; Transliteration: "Deai wa Mirakuru de Majikaru! Mahō no Purikyua Tanjō!" (Japanese: 出会いはミラクルでマジカル！魔法のプリキュア誕生！)	February 7, 2016
One night, a girl named Mirai Asahina spots something strange landing in the park nearby. The next day, she receives a pendant from her mother before going with her teddy bear Mofurun to investigate at the park. There, she encounters a magician named Liko, whose identical pendant reacts with Mirai's pendant when she tries to fly away. Just as the two girls get to know each other, they are attacked by Batty, an emissary of the evil Dokurokushe who seeks something known as the Linkle Stone Emerald. As Mirai and Liko try to escape, Batty transforms a dump truck into a monster called a Yokubaru to pursue them. When Mirai and Liko try chanting a spell to fend off the Yokubaru, their pendants transform into the Linkle Stone Diamond and grant them the power to transform into the Witchy Pretty Cures, Cure Miracle and Cure Magical. After driving Batty away and discovering that Mofurun had come to life in the process, Liko, hoping to find out more information, brings Mirai with her to the Magical World to take her to the Magic School that she attends.
2	"To the Exciting Magic School! Where's the Headmaster!?"; Transliteration: "Wakuwaku no Mahō Gakkō e! Kōchō-sensei wa Doko!?" (Japanese: ワクワクの魔法学校へ！校長先生はどこ！？)	February 14, 2016
Mirai and Liko arrive at the Magic School, where the Vice-Principal tells Liko that she will be punished for bringing a human to the Magical World. As Liko laments how she was searching for the Linkle Stone Emerald to compensate for her lack of magic abilities, Mofurun points out that Mirai and Liko now possess the Linkle Stone Diamond. Wanting to keep Liko from being expelled, Mirai goes off to search for the school's Headmaster and comes across another teacher, who explains how a magical tree grows wands. When Mirai expresses her desire to help Liko, the tree responds to her feelings and grows a new wand of her own. Just then, Batty and his Truck Yokubaru attack the school, and Mirai and Liko once again transform into Pretty Cures to fight against them. Responding to their resolve to protect the school, the tree grants the Cures a new power that transforms their wands into Linkle Sticks, allowing them to purify the Yokubaru. Afterwards, the teacher, who reveals himself to be the true Headmaster, urges Mirai to begin attending the Magic School alongside Liko during spring break.
3	"Shopping in the Magical Shopping District! The Power of Ruby is Awakened!"; Transliteration: "Mahō Shōtengai de Shoppingu! Mezameru Rubī no Chikara!" (Japanese: 魔法商店街でショッピング！目覚めるルビーの力！)	February 21, 2016
After informing her grandmother about entering the Magic School, Mirai goes with Liko to the Magical Shopping District to buy equipment for school. While visiting the various shops, Mirai obtains a school uniform and a broom before hearing about Liko's motivation in searching for the Linkle Stone Emerald. Just then, another enemy, Sparda, steals Mirai's Linkle Stone Diamond, preventing her and Liko from transforming, and summons a Rock Orange Yokubaru to attack the shopping district. Just as the girls are cornered, Liko's passion to protect her beloved town awakens the Linkle Stone Ruby, which was hidden in the town's flame. This allows her and Mirai to transform into the Ruby Style and defeat the Yokubaru, recovering Mirai's Linkle Stone Diamond in the process.
4	"Magic Lesson Start! Search for the Mysterious Butterfly!"; Transliteration: "Mahō no Jugyō Sutāto! Fushigi na Chōcho o Sagase!" (Japanese: 魔法の授業スタート！ふしぎなちょうちょを探せ！)	February 28, 2016
After being told about the Linkle Stones by the Headmaster, Mirai and Liko, along with their fellow students Jun, Emily, and Kei, begin taking supplementary classes, which they must pass to avoid repeating the year. Their first test involves chasing down paper butterflies before they get soaked by roaming rainclouds. As the other classmates manage to catch their butterflies, Mirai chases after hers into a constantly shifting labyrinth of bookshelves. There, she is attacked by another of Dokurokushe's minions, Gamets, who summons a Shark Yokubaru. After Mirai and Liko reunite, they are drawn towards a particular book before transforming to fight the Yokubaru. After the girls defeat the Yokubaru and retrieve their butterfly, the book they found transforms and gives birth to a small baby fairy.
5	"Passing By Each Other On the Ice Island!? Friendship That Connects Magic!"; Transliteration: "Kōri no Shima de Surechigai!? Mahō ga Tsunagu Yūjō!" (Japanese: 氷の島ですれ違い！？魔法がつなぐ友情！)	March 6, 2016
The book the girls found, which is revealed to be called the Linkle Smarthon, is found to be connected to both the baby fairy and the Linkle Stones. Meanwhile, the students are sent to a frozen island and tasked with boiling a kettle. As the students struggle to cast their magic due to the cold, Mirai comes up with an exercise to warm everyone up, allowing her and the others to successfully perform the required spell and pass the test. However, Liko, who wasn't as successful, becomes jealous of Mirai's magical prowess, leading to them arguing with each other while caught up in a snowstorm. They soon realize each other's mistakes and make up with each other, and they bear witness to an aurora that brings forth another Linkle Stone. Just then, Batty attacks with an Ice Bird Yokubaru, but the Cures manage to defeat it and retrieve the Linkle Stone Aquamarine. Afterwards, the girls name the baby fairy Ha-chan and become closer friends themselves.
6	"Special Training! Magic Wands! The Teacher is Liko's Older Sister!?"; Transliteration: "Tokkun! Mahō no Tsue! Sensei wa Riko no Onee-chan!?" (Japanese: 特訓！魔法の杖！先生はリコのお姉ちゃん！？)	March 13, 2016
With the girls' usual teacher absent, Liko's older sister, Liz, oversees their next test, in which they must use their wands to manipulate water into shapes. While the other girls work on maintaining shapes of things they care about, Liko is determined to match Liz' advanced shape of a performing elephant and becomes frustrated when she is unable to pull if off. She tells Mirai how she had always admired her sister, who gave her her Diamond pendant, but always struggled to live up to her expectations. Just then, Sparda attacks with an Hourglass Yokubaru, injuring Liz in the process. Stating her feelings to protect her beloved sister, Liko uses the Linkle Stone Aquamarine to cast freezing magic on the Yokubaru, allowing her and Mirai to defeat it. Afterwards, as the other girls manage to pass their tests, Liko is able to create a frozen pendant, which Liz praises her for.
7	"The Mermaid Village's Magic! Sapphire's Feelings Revived!"; Transliteration: "Ningyo no Sato no Mahō! Yomigaeru Safaia no Omoi!" (Japanese: 人魚の里の魔法！よみがえるサファイアの想い！)	March 20, 2016
For their next test, the girls are brought to a village of mermaids, where they must use their voices to open up clams. During a break, Mirai and Liko befriend three young mermaids who show them their village's treasure; a giant clam containing a treasure that allowed mermaids to swim through the sky. Just then, the village is attacked by Gamets and his Clam Yokubaru. As Mirai and Liko stay strong in the face of danger, the clams open up in response and awaken the village's treasure, the Linkle Stone Sapphire. After transforming into the Sapphire Style, the Cures are able to use the power of flight to defeat the Yokubaru.
8	"Magic Broom Go! Rescue the Pegasus Family!"; Transliteration: "Mahō no Hōki de Go! Pegasasu Oyako o Sukue!" (Japanese: 魔法のほうきでGO！ペガサス親子を救え！)	March 27, 2016
For their fifth test, the girls must master their brooms in order to take a magical photograph of a pegasus. While pursuing one of the pegasi, Mirai and Liko end up in an underground forest, where they find an injured pegasus foal. Mirai and Mofurun then find a large magical flower, which they use to heal the foal and reunite it with its mother, whose happy tears awaken the Linkle Stone Pink Tourmaline. Just then, Sparda captures the mother pegasus and uses her to create a Pegasus Yokubaru, leaving the Cures hesitant to attack. Noticing that the mother's love for her foal is still there, Mirai manages to use the Linkle Stone Pink Tourmaline to free the mother, allowing the Cures to defeat the Yokubaru and get their long-awaited photograph.
9	"Goodbye, Magical World!? Mirai and Liko's Final Test!"; Transliteration: "Sayonara, Mahō Kai!? Mirai to Riko no Saishū Tesuto!" (Japanese: さよなら魔法界！？みらいとリコの最終テスト！)	April 3, 2016
With their final exam approaching, Liko becomes worried about having to part ways with Mirai. The girls are pitted in a five-against-one magic match against Liz, in which they must bloom the flower on her hat before she blooms all of theirs. As the other girls are eliminated, Liko worries that Mirai seems eager to go home, when in reality, Mirai is holding back her sadness in order to help Liko pass and become a top magician. Upon joining forces, Mirai and Liko manage to beat Liz and earn everyone their passing grades. Just then, Batty steals the passing grades and creates a Moth Yokubaru, but the Cures manage to defeat it. The next day, as Mirai leaves for the Non-Magic World, Liko, having learned that a Linkle Stone is also in the Non-Magic World, decides to go with her.
10	"I'm Home! The Non-Magic World! Wait... Where's Liko?"; Transliteration: "Tadaima! Nashimahō Kai! tte Riko wa Doko?" (Japanese: ただいま！ナシマホウ界！ってリコはどこ？)	April 10, 2016
Upon arriving in the Non-Magic World, Mirai and Liko immediately come across the Linkle Stone Topaz, only for a crow to snatch it away. Liko sets off after it, only to succumb to hunger and wind up in the middle of town. She is found by Mirai's mother, Kyoko, who gives her some food as well as a clue on how to find her friend. As Mirai and Liko reunite at the food truck where they first met, Sparda appears and summons a Cat Biker Yokubaru. After the Cures defeat the Yokubaru, albeit losing track of the Linkle Stone in the process, Mirai and Liko arrive back at home, where Liko is surprised to find the person she met was Mirai's mother.
11	"Mofurun's First School Visit? Get the Exciting Topaz, mofu!" Transliteration: "Mofurun no Hatsutōkō? Wakuwaku no Topāzu o Getto, mofu!" (Japanese: モフルンの初登校？ワクワクのトパーズをゲットモフ！)	April 17, 2016
The Head Teacher informs Mirai's family that Liko will be attending Mirai's school and warns Mirai and Liko not to let anyone know they can use magic. Along with her belongings, Liko also receives Cathy, a crystal ball that will allow her to stay in contact with the Magical Realm. The next day, as Liko joins Mirai's class under the name Liko Izayoi, both girls find themselves in a pinch as not only has their classmate Kana Katsuki spotted them riding brooms from afar, but Mofurun and Ha-chan have also snuck into school. Just as Mofurun comes across the Linkle Stone Topaz, she encounters Gamets, who summons a Cherry Blossom Plane Yokubaru. Mofurun's desire to protect the school unlocks the Linkle Stone's power, allowing Mirai and Liko to transform into the Topaz Style and use its powers to defeat the Yokubaru. Afterwards, Ha-chan, who was able to use defensive magic during the battle, grows into an older form and convinces Mirai and Liko to let her and Mofurun attend school with them.\
12	"The Whole Starry Sky and Mirai's Memories"; Transliteration: "Manten no Hoshizora to Mirai no Omoide" (Japanese: 満天の星空とみらいの思い出)	April 24, 2016
After making some mistakes in class in her pursuit of academic perfection, Liko studies diligently on how to play volleyball to make up for it. Later that night, Mirai's father talks about how Mirai once got lost while stargazing in the mountains. Mirai then takes Liko stargazing, stating it was seeing the stars that helped her to be brave when she got lost. They suddenly come across Sparda, who summons a Cloud Yokubaru that grows larger from sucking up clouds. However, the Cures take advantage of the Yokubaru getting slower as a result and defeat it, becoming treated with a starry view that grants them the Linkle Stone Tanzanite. The next day, Liko is encouraged to talk and play with her classmates more.
13	"A Fun BBQ! I Found a Lot of Happiness!"; Transliteration: "Tanoshī BBQ! Shiawase Takusan Mitsuketa!" (Japanese: たのしいBBQ！幸せたくさんみ～つけた！)	May 1, 2016
Liko joins Mirai and her friends for a barbecue by the riverside, which Liz also attends. While pondering over a hand-written letter sent by the Headmaster, Mirai tries to show Liko how fun doing things without magic can be. As Liko comes to understand it from the deliciousness of a meal made from everyone's efforts, Batty attacks with a Beehive Yokubaru, but the Cures manage to defeat it by using the river. Afterwards, Liko finds the Linkle Stone Peridot among the clovers.
14	"Flower Marks For Everyone! The Great Test Operation!"; Transliteration: "Minna Hanamaru! Tesuto Daisakusen!" (Japanese: みんな花マル！テスト大作戦！)	May 8, 2016
Mirai has to re-take a test after getting a low score in math, a subject she struggles with. Despite Liko's best efforts to teach her, Mirai keeps getting distracted, particularly when it is assumed a Linkle Stone is at school. After noticing how Liko is working hard to learn how to write Japanese, Mirai decides to work harder in her own studies. On the day of the test, Liko does some sky writing to give Mirai some encouragement, allowing her to work hard. Afterwards, Gamets attacks with a Soccer Ball Yokubaru, but the Cures manage to defeat it using the power of their new Linkle Stones. As Mirai gets a passing grade in her test thanks to Liko's help, the Linkle Stone Moonstone comes from the moon in response to a flower mark that Ha-chan drew.
15	"All Topsy Turvy! Ha-chan's Seven Transformations!"; Transliteration: "Hachamecha Daikonran! Hā-chan Shichi Henge!" (Japanese: ハチャメチャ大混乱！はーちゃん七変化！)	May 15, 2016
Upon eating the food created by the Linkle Smarthon after everyone ignores her, Ha-chan suddenly starts changing into various forms, each with their own abilities and personalities. Things soon get crazy when she enters the school and starts drawing attention from the other students. As Mirai and Liko try to catch up with her, they come up against Sparda, who summons a Banana Power Line Yokubaru, but manage to defeat it and rescue Ha-chan. As Sparda reports about Ha-chan to her superior, Yamoh, Mirai and Liko apologise to Ha-chan for not taking proper care of her, discovering that her antics proved helpful to some of the students.
16	"Long Time No See! The Supplementary Classmates Have Arrived!"; Transliteration: "Hisashiburi! Hoshū Meito ga Yattekita!" (Japanese: 久しぶりっ！補習メイトがやってきた！)	May 22, 2016
Jun, Kei, and Emily – along with clothesmaker François – arrive in the Non-Magic World to visit Mirai and Liko. Along with Mirai's friends Mayumi and Kana, the girls go to the shopping mall, where Liko learns about their reason for coming here. Just then, Sparda confronts Mirai and Liko in pursuit of the Linkle Smarthon, using a helicopter to transform herself into a Yokubaru. Just as the Cures are overwhelmed, Ha-chan uses the Linkle Smarthon to give them the power needed to defeat Sparda, after which they send Jun and the others off.
17	"Please Tell Us, Miss Crystal Ball! The Person in Grandma's Memories"; Transliteration: "Suishō-san Oshiete! Obā-chan no Omoide no Hito" (Japanese: 水晶さんおしえて！おばあちゃんの思い出の人)	May 29, 2016
While cleaning the house, Kanoko comes across a photo album of when she was in middle school and recalls an encounter with a certain person. Wanting to find out who it was, Mirai and Liko enlist the help of Cathy to try and find him, only to come up against several dead ends. When they encounter a cat stuck in a tree, Mirai and Liko use their brooms to rescue it and are spotted from a distance by Kanoko, reminding her of a certain magician she met back then. Just as the girls discover the Linkle Stone Garnet, Gamets appears and summons a Rose Yokubaru. Although the Cures defeat the Yokubaru, Gamets escapes with the Linkle Stone after Ha-chan drops it.
18	"Return to the Magical World! Take Back the Linkle Stone!"; Transliteration: "Mahō Kai Futatabi! Rinkuru Sutōn o Torikaese!" (Japanese: 魔法界再び！リンクルストーンを取り返せ！)	June 5, 2016
Mirai and Liko are summoned by Gamets to face off against him for the stolen Garnet, prompting them to return to the Magical World. Facing a long journey to the island where Gamets awaits, the girls receive help from the mermaids and pegasi that they helped before. Upon the Cures' arrival, Gamets transforms himself into a more powerful form to battle against them, overwhelming them with his true strength. Just then, Ha-chan stands up against Gamets, awakening a power from the Linkle Smarthon and giving the Cures the strength to defeat Gamets and retrieve the Linkle Stone Garnet.
19	"Exploration & Adventure! The Mysteries of the Magic Door!"; Transliteration: "Tanken & Bōken! Mahō no Tobira no Nazo!" (Japanese: 探検&冒険！魔法のとびらのナゾ！)	June 12, 2016
While searching for the Headmaster to get information about Ha-chan, Mirai and Liko hear a rumor about a magic door hidden in a tree and decide to investigate. After facing living branches and giant caterpillars, the girls arrive at the fabled door, but are suddenly confronted by Batty. He uses the combined powers from Sparda and Gamets' wands to transform himself into a more powerful form. Once again, Ha-chan manages to call forth power from the Linkle Smarthon, gaining support from the forest and allowing the Cures to beat Batty. After receiving the Linkle Stone Amethyst and eating its fruit, Ha-chan goes to sleep inside the Linkle Smarthon, which unlocks the magic door for the girls.
20	"Terrible Fall! The Emerald Born Within the Magical Realm!"; Transliteration: "Dotabata de Yabasugi! Mahō Kai ni Umareta Emerarudo!" (Japanese: ドタバタでヤバスギ！魔法界に生まれたエメラルド！)	June 19, 2016
The Headmaster appears before Dokurokushe and Yamoh, but is confronted by Batty. Meanwhile, Mirai and Liko discover that the door responds to whatever they are thinking about, and soon wind up in Dokurokushe's hideout as well. The Headmaster recognizes Dokurokushe as his old friend, Kushe, who used forbidden magic to try and obtain the Linkle Stone Emerald and prevent a future calamity. The Headmaster attempts to fight but is overwhelmed by Dokurokushe's dark magic, which causes him to grow old. Dokurokushe then steals the Linkle Smarthon with Ha-chan inside, prompting the Cures to fight against him. Just then, the Linkle Stone Emerald awakens and sends power to the Linkle Smarthon, which Dokurokushe infuses into himself to become all-powerful.
21	"Stop! Dark Magic! Pretty Cure vs. Dokuroxy!"; Transliteration: "Stop! Yami no Mahō! Purikyua vs. Dokurokushī!" (Japanese: STOP！闇の魔法！プリキュアVSドクロクシー！)	June 26, 2016
As Dokurokushe's dark magic spreads across both the Magical and Non-Magic Worlds and drains their life energy, Mirai and Liko strengthen their resolve to save Ha-chan. Although Dokurokushe powers himself up by absorbing Yamoh, the Cures' bonds allow them to retrieve the Linkle Smarthon and beat Dokurokushe, destroying his skeleton form. Just as Dokurokushe's energy attempts to attack again, Ha-chan emerges from the Linkle Smarthon in a new form, using her power to dispel his evil before leading Kushe's spirit away to the afterlife, restoring peace to the world. Although Ha-chan is nowhere to be seen afterwards, Mofurun assures the girls she is out there somewhere.
22	"The New Legend is Sprouting! Cure Felice is Born!"; Transliteration: "Mebaeru Aratana Densetsu! Kyua Ferīche Tanjō!" (Japanese: 芽生える新たな伝説！キュアフェリーチェ誕生！)	July 3, 2016
As Mirai and Liko struggle to adjust to life without Ha-chan, Liko contemplates if she should return to the Magic School. Elsewhere, an evil genie escapes from a magic lamp and revives Yamoh, who recovers some of Dokurokushe's bones. Using one of these bones, Yamoh summons a Cicada Yokubaru, which proves to be more powerful than previous Yokubaru. Just as the Cures are cornered, a mysterious pink-haired girl appears and uses the Linkle Stone Emerald and the Linkle Smarthon to transform into a new Pretty Cure, Cure Felice. After defeating the Yokubaru, the girl reveals herself to be none other than Ha-chan herself.
23	"Together From Now On! Welcome Back, Ha-chan!"; Transliteration: "Korekara mo Yoroshiku! Okaeri, Hā-chan!" (Japanese: これからもよろしく！おかえり、はーちゃん！)	July 10, 2016
With Ha-chan now in possession of the Linkle Stone Emerald, Liko worries that she may have to return home since her mission is complete. As Ha-chan tries to adjust to her larger size, she manages to use her own magic wand to create a broom of her own. Meanwhile, the evil genie, Labut, offers his assistance to Yamoh, who summons a Water Gun Yokubaru to attack Ha-chan. As Mirai and Liko once again struggle to fight the stronger Yokubaru, Ha-chan gathers her resolve and once again transforms to help them defeat the Yokubaru. Afterwards, the girls manage to convince the Headmaster to let them continue staying together in the Non-Magic World, with Ha-chan taking on the new name of Kotoha Hanami.
24	"An Exciting Reform! Decorating Ha-chan's Room!"; Transliteration: "Wakuwaku Rifōmu! Hā-chan no Oheya-zukuri!" (Japanese: ワクワクリフォーム！はーちゃんのお部屋づくり！)	July 17, 2016
With Kotoha too big to share a bed with Mirai, the girls get together to convert the attic into a room for Kotoha. Using her magic, Kotoha manages to not only tidy up the bedroom, but also create furniture from thin air, much to the shock of Liko. While Liko teaches Kotoha about doing things without relying on magic by helping out Mirai's father, Mofurun feels downhearted over not being able to help much, but Mirai assures her that she's always been there to support her. Feeling Kotoha's room is missing some excitement, Mirai and Mofurun bring out an old jewelry machine to make some decorations. Later that day, Yamoh attacks with a Wallpaper Yokubaru, but the Cures manage to defeat it, after which Kotoha makes some hand-made accessories for her friends.
25	"The Summer! The Sea! Frolicking! We Want To Eat Shaved Ice!"; Transliteration: "Natsu da! Umi da! Ōhashagi! Kakigōri ga Tabetai!" (Japanese: 夏だ！海だ！大はしゃぎ！かき氷が食べた～いっ！)	July 24, 2016
The girls go with Mayumi and Kana to the beach, becoming excited by the prospect of eating shaved ice. Despite warnings from Mirai and Liko, Kotoha keeps using her magic to try and make things more exciting. As Mirai and Liko are left exhausted from having to turn things back to normal, Yamoh tricks Kotoha into going off into a cave and attacks her with a Hat Yokubaru. Luckily, the Cures manage to find her and help her defeat the Yokubaru. Afterwards, Kotoha apologizes for going overboard with her magic, only using it once more to make sure everyone can enjoy some shaved ice.
26	"Everyone's Thoughts are the Same! Ha-chan's Cookies"; Transliteration: "Omoi wa Minna Issho! Hā-chan no Kukkī" (Japanese: 想いはみんな一緒！はーちゃんのクッキー)	July 31, 2016
Believing that Mirai and Liko will be in danger as long as she possesses the Linkle Stone Emerald, Kotoha runs away from home after making them some cookies. As Mirai and Liko search for her upon learning she has gone missing, Mofurun catches up to Kotoha, who finds herself unable to use her magic. As Kotoha learns that the cookies she made were actually salty, Yamoh appears and uses his final bone to transform himself and capture Kotoha, who is unable to transform. Arriving to save her, Mirai and Liko tells Kotoha that they appreciated how hard she worked on her cookies, stating their desire to fulfill their wish of staying together. Reacting to everyone's feelings, the Pink Tourmaline sets Kotoha free, allowing her to transform and defeat Yamoh, after which they all return home together.
27	"Let's Enjoy! Magic School's Summer Vacation!"; Transliteration: "Let's Enjoy! Mahō Gakkō no Natsuyasumi!" (Japanese: Let'sエンジョイ！魔法学校の夏休み！)	August 7, 2016
The girls decide to spend the rest of their summer vacation at the Magic School, where they are preparing for a summer festival. As the girls spend time with Jun and the others, hearing about something causing a lack of frozen oranges, Mirai talks with the Headmaster about her determination to stay with her friends. Just then, Labut appears before them, trapping them in a barrier and summoning the more powerful Donyokubaru. Using the Emerald's power, Liko and Kotoha break through the barrier and help Mirai, while Labut informs them about something known as Deusmast that will bring about chaos. Despite the increased strength of the Donyokubaru, Mirai's determination encourages the Cures and the Headmaster to combine their strength and defeat it.
28	"A Summer Festival in the Magical World! Fly High, Fireworks!"; Transliteration: "Mahō Kai no Natsumatsuri! Hanabi yo, Takaku Agare!" (Japanese: 魔法界の夏祭り！花火よ、たかくあがれ！)	August 14, 2016
The Magic School's summer festival commences, with Jun, Kei, and Emily tasked with making fireworks. However, they discover that the Don-Don Flowers used for making the fireworks have mysteriously wilted. Upon hearing about a Pachi-Pachi Flower that can be used instead, the girls split into groups to find the flowers. With everyone's combined efforts, Mirai's group finds several flowers resembling the Pachi-Pachi Flower inside a cave, but are unsure which is the right one. As the girls pick which they believe are the right flowers, Labut appears and summons a Rabbit Donyokubaru to attack the Cures. Despite being restrained by hoops, the Cures trust in each other's actions and manage to defeat the Donyokubaru. Having made the right choice, the girls launch a fantastic fireworks display together.
29	"A New Magical Tale! Mofuderella is the Star!?"; Transliteration: "Aratana Mahō no Monogatari! Shuyaku wa Mofuderera!?" (Japanese: 新たな魔法の物語！主役はモフデレラ！？)	August 21, 2016
While waiting for Kotoha in the library, Mirai and Liko come across the Magical World's version of Cinderella. Later that night, the Linkle Smarthon glows and the girls suddenly find themselves as characters in the book, with Mofurun in the role of "Mofuderella". Following their roles, Liko, the fairy godmother, along with Mirai and Kotoha, the friendly mice, help Mofuderella get to the ball where the prince, played by the Headmaster, awaits. However, the wicked stepsisters, played by Batty and Sparda, bring out their own magician, Yamoh, who transforms Gamets, the wicked stepmother, into a giant. After winning a dance battle, the Cures use their magic to turn the stepmother back to normal size. As the girls struggle to get to return to their world before their carriage disappears, Mofuderella uses the magic of her glass slippers to create a Rainbow Carriage and help them get there in time. Upon waking up from what was seemingly a dream, the girls are surprised to find the Rainbow Carriage is there in the real world and that the book's contents have been changed to feature Mofuderella.
30	"The Magical Self-Research! Gah! It Won't End!"; Transliteration: "Mahō no Jiyū Kenkyū! Ga, Owaranai!!" (Japanese: 魔法の自由研究！が、終わらな～い！！)	August 28, 2016
As the girls discover the Rainbow Carriage has its own magical mysteries, they are asked by Jun and the others to help out with their self-research projects before vacation ends. Meanwhile, Labut is seen with two other dark spirits, Shakince and Benigyo. Upon hearing everyone's goals for the future, Liko becomes concerned that she doesn't know what she wants to do herself, but gets some advice from Liz. Just then, Labut attacks again with an artist Donyokubaru, noticing that Kotoha's power seems different from regular magic. Standing firm in their love of magic, the Cures gain power from the Rainbow Carriage and defeat the Donyokubaru. Afterwards, Mirai and the others return to the Non-Magic World to prepare for school.
31	"Crystalized Feelings! The Rainbow-Colored Alexandrite!!"; Transliteration: "Kesshō suru Omoi! Nijiiro no Arekisandoraito!!" (Japanese: 結晶する想い！虹色のアレキサンドライト！！)	September 4, 2016
During the train ride back to the Non-Magic World, Labut separates the girls' carriage from the snail train, trapping them in the space between worlds. Proving resilient to all of the Cures' attacks, Labut unleashes his full power, spreading everyone across the empty space. As everyone drifts into despair, Mirai manages to find her wand, remembering all the friends she has made through her encounter with magic and managing to send her feelings to her friends. With their feelings combined, the Cures reunite and bring forth a new Linkle Stone, Alexandrite, which transforms them into their Alexandrite forms. Combining all the Linkle Stones with the Rainbow Carriage, the Cures gain the power to kill Labut with the attack Extreme Rainbow. As the Alexandrite splits into three and returns inside the girls' bodies, a group of mysterious spirits suddenly appear.
32	"Lots of Excitement! Ha-chan's School Life!"; Transliteration: "Wakuwaku Ippai! Hā-chan no Gakkō Seikatsu!" (Japanese: ワクワクいっぱい！はーちゃんの学校生活！)	September 11, 2016
Kotoha begins attending school with Mirai and Liko, with some of the spirits deciding to follow them. While having fun at her first day of school, Kotoha notices that her classmate, Souta, is feeling downhearted, as he is the captain of a soccer team that has been struggling recently. Using some of her magic, Kotaha reminds Souta about the excitement of soccer, encouraging his teammates to practice with him. The next day, Shakince appears before the Cures and summons a Goalpost Donyokubaru. Using the soccer skills she learned from Souta, Kotoha manages to lead the Cures to victory. As Souta's team manage to win their soccer match, one of the spirits joins the Rainbow Carriage.
33	"Conflicted Feelings! Father and Daughter's Difficult Day!"; Transliteration: "Surechigau Omoi! Chichi to Musume no Bimyo~na Ichinichi!" (Japanese: すれ違う想い！父と娘のビミョ～な1日！)	September 18, 2016
The girls are visited by Liko's archaeologist father, Lien, who had learned from the Headmaster about their identity as Pretty Cures. As Lien looks into the mysteries behind the spirits and the Linkle Stone Diamond, Liko feels downhearted, as she believes her father is more interested in his work than spending time with her. While Mirai tells Liko about how much parents worry about their children, Mirai's father tells Lien about how strong children can grow. Just then, Benigyo appears and summons a Water Donyokubaru, injuring Lien when he steps in to protect Liko. After the Cures defeat the Donyokubaru, Lien tells Liko that the spirits most likely relate to the girls' emotions, promising to come see her again, while another spirit joins the Rainbow Carriage.
34	"Heart-Pounding! First Love Tastes Like Strawberry Melon Bread!?"; Transliteration: "Dokidoki! Hatsukoi no Aji wa Ichigo Meronpan!?" (Japanese: ドキドキ！初恋の味はイチゴメロンパン！？)	September 25, 2016
Mayumi ends up falling in love with a boy from another school after he helps her out. Wanting to help Mayumi, the girls and Kana try to help her confess her feelings. While writing out a love letter, Mayumi tells Liko about how Mirai befriended her after she lost her hairpin. Mayumi works up the courage to confess to the boy, only to become heartbroken when she discovers that he already has a girlfriend. While the Cures get held up having to fight off Shakince and his Clock Donyokubaru, Mayumi thanks Kana for crying for her sake and becomes close friends with her.
35	"The Student Council President General Election! A Noble Vote for Liko!"; Transliteration: "Seitokaichō Sōsenkyo! Riko ni Kiyoki Ippyō o!" (Japanese: 生徒会長総選挙！リコに清き一票を！)	October 2, 2016
Liko decides to run for student council president against her classmate Yuto Namiki. As Liko gains appeal thanks in part to Mofurun, she notices how hard Yuto works behind the scenes to benefit the school, leaving her uncertain of what she wants to do as president herself. Meanwhile, another dark wizard, Orba, sends a spy to observe the girls, taking an interest in Mofurun. On the morning of the election, Benigyo attacks with a Poster Donyokubaru, during which Yuto risks himself to protect the school's flower bed. Sharing the same desire to protect the school, Liko defeats the Donyokubaru with the Cures before conceding the election to Yuto, feeling that he will make the better president.
36	"Mirai, Mofurun, and Sometimes Chikurun! Wait... Who!?"; Transliteration: "Mirai to Mofurun, Tokidoki Chikurun! tte Dare!?" (Japanese: みらいとモフルン、ときどきチクルン！って誰！？)	October 9, 2016
Orba's spy, Chikurun, is caught by the girls after eating Mirai's pancakes, but manages to pass himself off as a fairy. Hoping to learn more about the Pretty Cure, he hears from Mirai about how Mofurun has always been with her since she was born, during which Mofurun spots a photo of a familiar place. Upon receiving this information, Orba has Chikurun bring Mofurun outside so he can lure the Cures into fighting against his Bench Donyokubaru. Wanting to protect the flower field she saw with Mirai, Mofurun's feelings give the Cures the strength to defeat the Donyokubaru.
37	"Decide with Magic? A Recipe for Frozen Mandarins!"; Transliteration: "Mahō ga Kimete? Reitō Mikan no Reshipi!" (Japanese: 魔法が決め手？冷凍みかんのレシピ！)	October 16, 2016
Hearing that the Headmaster has disappeared again, the girls return to the Magical World and find him on the hottest island gathering ingredients for frozen mandarins. Upon reaching the Ice Island, they discover that the ice dragons who normally freeze them are struggling to use their ice breath since they don't feel enough warmth. As Mirai tries to get one dragon to help freeze some mandarins, Benigyo attacks with a Basket Donyokubaru. Noticing Mirai struggling with the cold, the ice dragon gives her a lift to join the others and helps the Cures stop the Donyokubaru. Afterwards, the ice dragon, warmed by Kotoha's feelings, helps freeze the mandarins, which the girls share with Chikurun.
38	"Sweet? Not Sweet? The Magical Pumpkin Festival!"; Transliteration: "Amai? Amakunai? Mahō no Kabocha Matsuri!" (Japanese: 甘い？甘くない？魔法のかぼちゃ祭り！)	October 23, 2016
The girls go to a pumpkin festival, hosted by idol and secret magician Mayu Watanabe, where magicians chase after a flying pumpkin to try and win a golden egg. As the girls chase after the pumpkin, they come up against Shakince and discover that the pumpkin seems to be scared of everyone chasing it. While the Cures fight against Shakince's Ice Cream Donyokubaru, Mofurun discovers that the pumpkin was being bothered by a toothache. After its rotten tooth is removed, the pumpkin helps the Cures defeat the Donyokubaru, after which Mofurun is declared the winner and is rewarded with the golden egg, which grows into a toothbrush tree.
39	"Today is Halloween! Smile, Everyone!"; Transliteration: "Kyō wa Harowin! Minna Egao ni Naare!" (Japanese: 今日はハロウィン！み～んな笑顔になぁれ！)	October 30, 2016
Several students of the Magic School decide to go with Mirai and the others to the Non-Magic World to celebrate Halloween, where their magician outfits would be passed off as costumes. As Mirai's classmates put on a crêpe stand for their town's Halloween Festival, Jun and the others end up causing trouble while using magic to try and help out, but they apologize by helping out normally and become friends with the other students. Just then, Benigyo attacks with a Ghost Balloon Donyokubaru, prompting the Cures to step in to protect the festival and the bonds between the two worlds. As the Donyokubaru is defeated and the festival continues, Kanoko has a brief reunion with the Headmaster, while Lien looks into an old legend about citizens from different worlds becoming friends.
40	"A Celebration Filled With Love! Liko's Birthday!"; Transliteration: "Aijō Ippai no Omedetō! Riko no Tanjōbi!" (Japanese: 愛情いっぱいのおめでとう！リコの誕生日！)	November 13, 2016
Liko is surprised that her mother, Lilia, has been working in the Non-Magic World as a TV chef and, along with Liz and Lien, has come by to celebrate her birthday. As a rather extravagant party is held, Liko feels embarrassed as Lilia reads her an old fairy tale in front of the others, but comes to realize she is always thinking about what would make her daughter happy. Just then, Shakince suddenly warps the girls to another dimension and attacks with a Party Donyokubaru, revealing that Deusmast will soon arrive and destroy all planets, including Earth. Determined to pay back her parents' feelings, Liko uses the Linkle Stone Tanzanite to return to the real world and defeat the Donyokubaru. Afterwards, Liko gives thanks to her family for a wonderful birthday while Mirai and Kotoha give her their own present.
41	"There's Jewelry Everyday! Studying After School At Magic School!"; Transliteration: "Juerī na Mainichi! Mahō Gakkō e Hōkago Ryūgaku!" (Japanese: ジュエリーな毎日！魔法学校へ放課後留学！)	November 20, 2016
With travel time between the Magical and Non-Magic Worlds shortened, the girls decide to spend more time taking lessons at the Magic School. With Liko's room full of art supplies, everyone decides to have a sleepover in Jun's room. As the girls have fun while keeping a watch out for the patrolling Vice-Principal, Jun gives Liko a doll for her birthday, mentioning how fun everything has become since Mirai arrived. Meanwhile, as the Headmaster goes to the tree where Kushe was last seen, he is confronted by Orba, who summons a Boat Donyokubaru when the Cures arrive. Although the Cures manage to defeat the Donyokubaru, Orba uses the distraction to retrieve Kushe's spellbook, which was left behind after Dokurokushe's death.
42	"Deliver to Chikurun! A Magic Pudding with Feelings!"; Transliteration: "Chikurun ni Todoke! Omoi o Noseta Mahō no Purin!" (Japanese: チクルンにとどけ！想いをのせた魔法のプリン！)	November 27, 2016
While everyone decides to make honey pudding for him, Chikurun, who became Orba's spy to avoid being scolded by his queen, is ordered to steal the Linkle Stones. Following a conflict about betraying his new friends, Chikurun steals the Linkle Stones and delivers them to Shakince, who reveals that Chikurun is a spy before swallowing them. Angry that Shakince went back on his word not to hurt the others, Chikurun rushes in to recover some of the Linkle Stones so they Cures can transform, getting hurt in the process. Despite his betrayal, both the Cures and Mofurun stand to protect Chikurun, helping them to bring out the full power of the Topaz Style and kill Shakince. After everyone eats the pudding they made together, they travel to the Fairy Village to apologize to Chikurun's queen.
43	"Onwards to the Fairy Village! The Secret of the Magical Realm is Revealed!"; Transliteration: "Iza Yōsei no Sato e! Akasareru Mahō Kai no Himitsu!" (Japanese: いざ妖精の里へ！あかされる魔法界のヒミツ！)	December 4, 2016
Upon arriving in the Fairy Village, Kotoha transforms into a fairy and Chikurun is reunited with the queen. After hearing about the Sea of Flowers from Kotoha's memories, the queen's great predecessor, the Legend Queen, reveals that thousands of years ago, humans, creatures, and fairies lived together in harmony under the watchful eye of Mother RaPaPa. When Deusmast and his servants attacked, Mother RaPaPa used all of her energy to seal them away, causing the Mother Tree to drift off into space. The Mother Tree eventually formed the Magical World, while the world that was left behind became the Non-Magic World. Just then, Orba appears with a resurrected Sparda, who summons a Fire Rock Yokubaru to attack the village. After the Cures manage to defeat the Yokubaru and drive off Orba and Sparda, the Legend Queen further explains that the Pretty Cure are rumored to help once again reconnect the worlds before Chikurun bids farewell to everyone.
44	"Mofurun's Great Struggle! Everyone has Become Kids!?"; Transliteration: "Mofurun Dai Funtō! Minna Kodomo ni Nacchatta!?" (Japanese: モフルン大奮闘！みんな子供になっちゃった！？)	December 11, 2016
Orba tries out a spell which ends up turning Mirai, Liko, and Kotoha into little children. As the Headmaster looks for a way to turn them back to normal, Mofurun is left in charge of the girls, who have trouble controlling their magic in their younger forms, while also trying to keep them a secret from Mirai's mother. Meanwhile, Sparda manages to find Batty and Gamets and has Orba resurrect them as well. While Batty sees no point in his revival and goes off on his own, Sparda and Gamets attack with a Seashell Yokubaru, with Mofurun's determination to protect everyone prompting the Cures to transform, returning them to normal in the process. During the battle, Orba questions Kotoha over who she really is, but she manages to stand by her friends and defeat the Yokubaru.
45	"Feelings Spread Across Time...! The Shape of Friendship!"; Transliteration: "Omoi wa Toki o Koete...! Yūjō no Katachi!" (Japanese: 想いは時を超えて。。。！友情のかたち！)	December 18, 2016
As the girls report what they've learned to the Headmaster, who had come to the Non-Magic World, Cathy tells them about his relationship with Kushe. They soon come across Batty, who has no desire to fight, before Orba suddenly appears, bringing the Cures to a stage using the dark magic in Kushe's tome to power up Sparda and Gamets. Orba further reveals that the creation of Dokurokushe and his minions were all part of his plan to free Deusmast and his servants, and that Kotoha has inherited Mother RaPaPa's power. Just then, Sparda attempts to steals the tome for herself, but Orba brings out his full power, along with a Clock Donyokubaru, and reverts Sparda and Gamets back into animals. However, Batty combines Sparda, Gamets, and Yamoh into his own Yokubaru to defeat the Donyokubaru while the Cures kill Orba, who uses the last of his strength to spread the rest of the dark magic in the tome across the world, awakening more sealed genies. As Batty leaves with his comrades, the Headmaster finds a message from Kushe in his tome.
46	"A Magical Christmas! Mirai Becomes Santa!?"; Transliteration: "Mahō no Kurisumasu! Mirai, Santa ni Naru!?" (Japanese: 魔法のクリスマス！みらい、サンタになる！？)	December 25, 2016
Mirai learns that many adult magicians take turns being Santa Claus to deliver presents across both the Magical and Non-Magical Worlds. When Issac ends up breaking his back, Mirai and the others decide to take his place as part-time Santas. Meanwhile, Kana makes a wish to Santa to see a real magician, explaining to Mayumi how looking for proof of magicians gives her something to believe in. After delivering presents to the Magical Shopping District, the girls are sent to their hometown to deliver more presents, where they are spotted by Kana and Mayumi. As the girls search for them, they are attacked by Benigyo, who summons a Christmas Tree Donyokubaru. After the Cures rescue them and defeat the Donyokubaru, Kana is satisfied with meeting real magicians and, along with Mayumi, promises to keep their existence a secret.
47	"All Of Our Wishes! Which Way To Tomorrow?"; Transliteration: "Sorezore no Negai! Ashita wa Docchi dā?" (Japanese: それぞれの願い！明日はどっちだー？)	January 8, 2017
Snow begins to fall upon the Magic School, which is usually in an eternal spring, signalling that Deusmast's resurrection is imminent. Meanwhile, Mirai takes Liko and Kotoha to visit the nearby shrine and wish for everyone's happiness. While making their own wishes, Liko and Kotoha become worried about how long they'll be able to stay together. Just then, Deusmast approaches both worlds and blocks out the sun, with Benigyo absorbing the power of her allies to fight against the Cures. Just as the Cures manage to overpower Benigyo and are about to kill her, Deusmast appears, consuming all of his servants and creating a vortex that the Cures get sucked into. When Mirai awakens the next day, she finds that the Magical and Non-Magical Worlds have somehow combined.
48	"Never-ending Chaos! Deusmast's World!!"; Transliteration: "Owarinaki Konton! Deusumasuto no Sekai!!" (Japanese: 終わりなき混沌！デウスマストの世界！！)	January 15, 2017
Finding that everyone seems unsurprised about the magic around the world, Mirai and the others realize that the world is being consumed by Deusmast's chaos, which is barely being held back by the magic tree. As the girls explain the situation to the headmaster, the Linkle Smarthon informs Kotoha of the history of Deusmast and Mother RaPaPa, who had been residing inside the tree. The Headmaster warns the girls that if they manage to stop Deusmast, the Magical and Non-Magical Worlds may be separated as a result. Believing that they may still be able to meet again regardless what happens, the Cures set off to confront Deusmast. Recognizing the Cures' motivation to build a peaceful world with their own strength, the remaining spirits join the Rainbow Carriage, completing the magic circle inside.
49	"Farewell... Magicians! Miraculous Magic, One More Time!"; Transliteration: "Sayonara... Mahōtsukai! Kiseki no Mahō yo, Mō Ichido!" (Japanese: さよなら。。。魔法つかい！奇跡の魔法よ、もう一度！)	January 22, 2017
Calling upon the power of the completed Rainbow Carriage, the Cures reach their full power, with Kotoha awakening the power of Mother RaPaPa inside of her. Deusmast attempts to draw chaos energy from the world to counter it, but the Cures are powered by the life energy from everyone's wishes, giving them the strength to finally kill Deusmast once and for all. With Deusmast's death, Kotoha, who has now become the new Mother RaPaPa, returns the Magical and Non-Magic Worlds back to their original forms and Mirai and Liko to part ways, with Mofurun reverting to a regular teddy bear. Several years later, Mirai, who is now a university student, hears from Kanoko about how miracles can come forth from connecting feelings. One night, upon finding a wand-shaped stick during her walk, Mirai desperately attempts to cast a spell to see everyone again. Responding to her feelings, the Linkle Stone Diamond transforms the stick into a proper wand and reunites Mirai with Liko, Kotoha, Mofurun, and the others.
50	"Cure Up RaPaPa! Let Tomorrow Be a Great Day As Well!!"; Transliteration: "Kyuappu RaPaPa! Ashita mo Ii Hi ni Naare!!" (Japanese: キュアップ・ラパパ！未来もいい日になあれ！！)	January 29, 2017
As the girls get together to reminisce, Kotoha uses her magic with some strawberry melon bread to turn everyone into 14-year olds once more. However, Kotoha's wand gets sucked up by a greedy monster, which they chase into the Magic School. There, Batty, who is now a student, explains that the culprit is a monster spawned from Dokurokushe's desire for sweets. As the girls chase after her, Yamoh manages to return to his previous form and joins the chase. Along the way, the girls come across the KiraKira Patisserie, where a patissiere named Ichika Usami treats them to some special sweets. When Yamoh appears with the monster, Chikurun manages to recover Kotoha's wand when the monster almost sucks him in. Transforming into Pretty Cures once more, the girls defeat the monster with help from another Pretty Cure named Cure Whip, healing its rotten tooth and allowing it to enjoy sweets normally. Understanding the bond and memories that come from sharing sweets, the girls ride the Rainbow Carriage across the world to share strawberry melon bread with everyone, aiming to make their futures good ones.

== See also ==
- Witchy Pretty Cure! The Movie: Wonderous! Cure Mofurun! - An animated film based on the series.
- Pretty Cure All Stars: Singing with Everyone♪ Miraculous Magic! - The eighth Pretty Cure All Stars crossover film, which features the Witchy Pretty Cure.
