= List of DokiDoki! PreCure episodes =

- Season 10
- Cover of first DVD volume released by Marvelous AQL featuring (clockwise from bottom left) Cure Heart, Cure Rosetta, Cure Sword and Cure Diamond.
- No. of episodes: 49 (30 dubbed)

Release
- Original network: ANN (ABC)
- Original release: February 3, 2013 – January 26, 2014

Series chronology
- ← Previous; Smile Precure Next → HappinessCharge PreCure!

DokiDoki! PreCure is the tenth anime television series in Izumi Todo and Bandai's Pretty Cure franchise, produced by Asahi Broadcasting Corporation and Toei Animation. The series follows Mana Aida and her friends as they become legendary warriors known as the Pretty Cure in order to fight against the evil Jikochu, who attempt to manipulate the hearts of innocent people.

The original DokiDoki! Precure series aired in Japan between February 3, 2013, and January 26, 2014, replacing Smile PreCure! in its initial timeslot, and was succeeded by HappinessCharge PreCure!. The opening theme song is "Happy Go Lucky! DokiDoki! Precure" (Happy Go Lucky！ドキドキ！プリキュア, Happy Go Lucky! DokiDoki! Purikyua) by Tomoyo Kurosawa, the ending theme for the first 26 episodes is "Kono Sora no Mukō" (この空の向こう; Beyond the Sky) by Hitomi Yoshida and the ending theme for the remaining 23 episodes is "Love Link" (ラブリンク, Rabu Rinku) by Yoshida.

The English-language localization Glitter Force: Doki Doki was produced originally under Saban Brands under its SCG Characters unit, and moved to Toei in June 2017. The series adapts the 49 Japanese episodes into 30 English episodes, with some content cut or combined across multiple episodes. Released as a Netflix Original Series outside of Japan, the first season was released on August 18, 2017, with the second season released on November 10, 2017. The theme song is "Glitter Force Doki Doki", performed by Blush, who also perform the insert songs before the closing credits that use footage of the girls in various computer-animated dance sequences.

== Episode list ==
=== DokiDoki! Precure (Japanese version) ===
No.	Title	Original air date
1	"The Earth is in a Big Pinch! The Last Remaining Precure!!"; Transliteration: "Chikyū ga Dai Pinchi! Nokosareta Saigo no Purikyua!!" (Japanese: 地球が大ピンチ！残された最後のプリキュア!!)	February 3, 2013
In the distant Trump Kingdom, a lone Precure named Cure Sword is seen fighting a desperate battle against an unbeatable enemy. Meanwhile on Earth, student council president Mana Aida is helping look after the students of Ōgai First Public Middle School during a school trip to the fabled Clover Tower. Whilst visiting the mall with her friend, Rikka Hishikawa, she spots popular idol Makoto Kenzaki, and helps to return a curious medallion that she drops whilst her manager escort her out. Whilst visiting an accessory stand, Mana spots a similar looking item known as the Cure Lovead and the shopkeeper gives it to her. As Mana and Rikka wait in line to get to the top of the Clover Tower, a mysterious boy named Ira manipulates the heart of an impatient customer, transforming his selfish thoughts into a crab-like monster known as a Jikochu, which wreaks havoc before heading up to the top floor. Fearing for a young girl whom she helped previously, Mana chases after the Jikochu, followed closely by a fairy named Sharuru. After getting the girl to safety, Mana is approached by Sharuru, who turns into a Lovely Commune, asking her to transform. As Mana struggles with figuring out how to transform, Cure Sword appears and defeats the Jikochu, returning the now purified heart to its rightful owner. Shortly afterwards, Cure Sword is ensnared by another Crab Jikochu created by Ira's ally, Marmo. As Mana wishes to protect her, her Cure Lovead glows and, when used with the Lovely Commune, gives Mana the power to transform into the Precure, Cure Heart.
2	"Oops! Cure Heart's Secret Identity Has Been Blown!!"; Transliteration: "Gān! Kyua Hāto no Shōtai ga Barechatta!!" (Japanese: ガーン！キュアハートの正体がバレちゃった!!)	February 10, 2013
As Mana gets used to her new powers, Cure Sword attempts to break free from the Jikochu, but gets dragged off the side of the tower with it, although Mana manages to save her at the last minute. Hearing the plea of help from the heart inside the Jikochu, Mana realises that the human heart inside is forced to become a Jikochu, wishing to return it back, and gains a new Cure Lovead that enables her to use her purifying attack, My Sweet Heart, to defeat the Jikochu. Afterwards, Mana tries to make friends with Cure Sword, but she refuses, preferring to be alone. On the way back, Mana tells Rikka about her becoming a PreCure, although she doesn't believe her. Later that night, as Mana heads to Rikka's house to tell her more, she is promptly informed by Sharuru and her fellow fairies, Raquel and Lance, that she is supposed to keep her identity a secret so that she doesn't drag others into her fight. Mana's attempts at keeping herself from telling Rikka about her identity only serves to make Rikka worry. Just then, Ira uses a student's heart to create a Traffic Light Jikochu, which starts causing havoc by freezing people in place. After getting the other students to safety, Mana decides to place her trust in Rikka and transforms in front of her. Mana ends up getting frozen in place by the Jikochu's red light, but Rikka manages to push a button on its back to change its lights to green, allowing Mana to move again and defeat it. After the battle, Rikka gives her thanks to Mana for trusting in her.
3	"The Greatest Partner Appears! Cure Diamond!!"; Transliteration: "Saikō no Aibō Tōjō! Kyua Daiyamondo!!" (Japanese: 最高の相棒登場！キュアダイヤモンド!!)	February 17, 2013
In the Science Lab, as Rikka tries to determine the secrets behind the Cure Loveads, Raquel suggests that she might be able to become a PreCure herself, though Rikka doesn't feel like she has the potential to become one. Upon returning home, Rikka receives some souvenirs from her travelling father and writes him a letter back. The next day, Mana and Rikka run into the shopkeeper who gave Mana the Cure Lovead, who gives Rikka a Lovead of her own, which she is reluctant to accept as she suspects that there is something fishy going on. Meanwhile, Ira targets another citizen who is sore about not receiving any letters and creates a goat-like Letterbox Jikochu, who starts chewing up everyone's letters. As Mana takes a beating trying to protect Rikka's letter to her father, Rikka concentrates on her feelings of friendship with Mana and gains the power to transform with Raquel to become the PreCure, Cure Diamond, defeating the Jikochu with her purifying attack, Twinkle Diamond. Following the battle, as the girls realize that they have lost Lance, they are approached by their friend from elementary school, Alice Yotsuba.
4	"I Must Decline! I Can't Become a PreCure!!"; Transliteration: "Okotowarishimasu wa! Watashi, Purikyua ni Narimasen!!" (Japanese: お断りしますわ！私、プリキュアになりません!!)	February 24, 2013
Alice brings Mana and Rikka to her mansion, revealing that not only had she found Lance after they left him behind in the Science Lab, but had also discovered their PreCure identities after spotting them on the security cameras at Clover Tower, which is owned by her father, allowing her to have full access to the database. Alice decides to appoint herself as their 'PreCure Producer', using her network to help the girls locate Jikochu and keep their identities safe. This helps Mana and Rikka defeat a Music Player Jikochu that Ira sets loose in town. However, Lance becomes depressed when Alice says she doesn't want to become a Pretty Cure herself, despite her having a Cure Lovead she received from the mysterious shopkeeper. Mana and Rikka explain to Lance about their childhood with Alice, during which she got into a fight against some bullies who were badmouthing Mana, easily beating them up with the martial arts she was taught. Alice came to fear her own strength and vowed never to fight again, which is why she doesn't want to become a Pretty Cure. Whilst Mana and Rikka go off to fight a Boombox Jikochu, Lance goes again to talk to Alice, reminding her that power is to be used to protect those dearest to you. Overcoming her fear, Alice gains the power to transform into Cure Rosetta and uses her barrier abilities to help Mana and Rikka defeat the Jikochu. Following the battle, Alice reveals states she believes the identity of Cure Sword to be none other than Makoto.
5	"No Way! That Girl is Cure Sword??"; Transliteration: "Uso! Kyua Sōdo-tte Anoko nano??" (Japanese: うそ！キュアソードってあの子なの??)	March 3, 2013
After explaining her reasons for believing Makoto is Cure Sword, Alice uses her connections to get Mana and Rikka into a television studio where Makoto is rehearsing for a TV appearance. Mana decides to ask Makoto directly to be her ally, but she snaps back at her, saying her performance is too important. As Mana becomes downhearted by this, she and the others are approached by Makoto's manager, Davie, who explains how Makoto had always worked hard to bring smiles to others with her music, showing Mana her performance to show her what it means. Just then, Marmo targets another idol who was jealous of Makoto's popularity and creates a Star Jikochu which starts attacking Makoto. As Mana and the others risk themselves in order to protect Makoto's important concert, Cure Sword appears and defeats the Jikochu before leaving just as mysteriously. Having failed to properly talk with Makoto following the incident, Mana receives a letter from Davie, inviting her to a handshake meet with Makoto, giving her a chance to express how she felt about her music.
6	"What a Surprise! MakoPi is Coming to My House!?"; Transliteration: "Bikkuri! Atashi no Ouchi ni Makopī ga kuru!?" (Japanese: ビックリ！私のお家にまこぴーがくる!?)	March 10, 2013
Wanting her to take a change of pace from singing all the time, Makoto's manager arranges for her to appear on a cooking show, which Makoto decides to hold at The Pig's Tail restaurant where Mana lives. However, the rehearsal goes horribly wrong as Makoto has no experience with cooking to the point that she didn't even know eggs were food. Wanting to help her out, Mana and the others decide to help Makoto learn how to make omurice in a way that she finds easy to learn. Thanks to all her practice, Makoto manages to put up a delicious piece of food on the day of filming that she shares with the others, reminding her of the heart she used to put into her songs. As Makoto starts to open up to the others, Ira targets the cameraman and creates a Pig Jikochu which starts eating everything in the restaurant, including the restaurant itself, in order to grow bigger. Not wanting the pig to eat the omurice she made with her new friends, Makoto finally reveals her identity as Cure Sword to the others, with Davie also revealed to be her fairy partner, and defeats the Jikochu. Just as Makoto decides to join up with the other Cures, they are approached by the third member of the Jikochu Trio, Bel, who banishes them to the Trump Kingdom.
7	"An Intense Battle! Farewell, Precure!!"; Transliteration: "Girigiri no Tatakai! Saraba, Purikyua!!" (Japanese: ギリギリの戦い！さらば、プリキュア!!)	March 17, 2013
The girls find themselves in the ruined Trump Kingdom, separated from their partners and beholding the fearsome King Jikochu looming in the distance. As Davie helps the other fairies search for the girls, both she and Makoto explain what happened to the Trump Kingdom. Makoto was once a warrior and songstress who served the Trump Kingdom's princess, Marie Ange. Then one day, the kingdom was attacked by the Jikochu, who turned the hearts of its citizens into its large army. Ange managed to seal King Jikochu into a dormant state, but exhausted her energy in doing so. After sending the newly born Sharuru, Raquel, and Lance to search for the PreCure, Makoto and Ange escaped through a portal but become separated when Ange chooses to defend Makoto from Bel's attacks. Finding herself on Earth, Makoto became an idol in the hopes that her songs would one day reach Ange. Makoto explains that King Jikochu gains power from the Dark Energy created from Jikochu, but requires Ange in order to undo the seal placed upon him. The girls are soon chased after by a gang of Frog Jikochu. Makoto tells the girls to leave her behind, but Mana and the others insist that they want to help restore the Trump Kingdom. The group start making their way to the castle, where the mirror that leads to Earth lies. Upon arriving however, they encounter Bel, who cracks the mirror, seemingly trapping them in the Trump Kingdom. Luckily, Mana gives the others courage by theorising they can still return to their world, deducing that Bel has the ability to do so and as such they can use his power to do so. Reuniting with their partners and transforming, the PreCures combine their powers to beat back Bel before using one of the remaining mirror fragments to warp back to Earth. Arriving back safely, the girls make a promise to find Ange and return the Trump Kingdom to its former glory.
8	"Kyupirappa~! A Mysterious Baby is Born!!"; Transliteration: "Kyupirappa~! Fushigi Aka-chan Tanjō!!" (Japanese: きゅぴらっぱ～！ふしぎ赤ちゃん誕生!!)	March 24, 2013
The girls decide to visit the mysterious shopkeeper who gave them the Cure Loveads in order to learn more of the situation. Inside his store, they find a strange egg, which suddenly cracks open to reveal a flying baby that takes a liking to the girls. After learning the baby, whom they name Ai, has some link to the Trump Kingdom, the shopkeeper, who introduces himself as Joe Okada, ends up leaving Ai in the girls' care. As the girls have trouble trying to help Ai Chan calm down, Marmo targets a sleepy businessman and creates a Sheep Jikochu, which uses its powers to make the PreCures sleepy, leaving them vulnerable to attack. As the PreCures struggle to stay awake, Ai starts getting louder, causing the Jikochu to use its powers to its full extent to make Ai stop crying and fall asleep, but are unsuccessful and puts Marmo and the PreCures to sleep instead. When the Jikochu attempt to attack Ai, she suddenly glows, helping the PreCures to wake each other up and beat the Jikochu. Afterwards, Makoto helps Ai go to sleep with a lullaby.
9	"Nonsense! Ai-chan Goes to School!!"; Transliteration: "Hachamecha! Ai-chan Gakkō ni Iku!!" (Japanese: ハチャメチャ！アイちゃん学校にいく!!)	March 31, 2013
Joe forces Mana and Rikka to take Ai to school with them, so Sharuru, Raquel, and Lance offer to help look after her during classes. When Mana struggles to calm Ai down, she receives a new Cure Lovead which helps Ai go to sleep. However, when the fairies accidentally disturb Ai from her nap, she goes off around the school, causing chaos with her powers. She then ends up altering charts Mana made for the soccer and baseball captains, leading them to be targeted by Ira and used to create Soccerball and Baseball Jikochu. As the PreCures struggle against the Jikochu's attacks, Ai once again uses her power to give the PreCures a speed boost. With Rikka's management, the Cures beat the Jikochu at their own game and defeat them.
10	"The Transfer Student is a National Super Idol!!"; Transliteration: "Tenkōsei wa, Kokuminteki Sūpā Aidoru!!" (Japanese: 転校生は、国民的スーパーアイドル!!)	April 7, 2013
Excitement heightens at school when Makoto transfers into Mana's class. This proves hectic however, due to Makoto both being new to various things and attracting attention due to her idol status, but Rikka manages to keep things in order. Deep down, however, Rikka feels conflicted over seeing Mana spend more time with Makoto. The next day, as Rikka becomes more anxious seeing Mana and Makoto together, she and Alice come across Marmo, who targets one of Makoto's supporters and creates a Fanatic Jikochu. Seeing this, Rikka comes to realise she has become jealous of Mana and Makoto's new friendship, but Alice assures her it is a natural feeling that everyone has once in a while. Overcoming her uneasiness, Rikka and the other PreCures manage to defeat the Jikochu. Following the battle, Makoto states her own envy of the strong partnership between Mana and Rikka, putting Rikka at ease that everyone shares the feelings of wanting to become closer.
11	"Awaken! The Precures' New Power!"; Transliteration: "Mezame yo! Purikyua no Aratanaru Chikara!" (Japanese: めざめよ！プリキュアの新たなる力！)	April 14, 2013
Mana is asked to help out the softball team with a match after their pitcher hurts her arm. Whilst training herself, she also helps give some advice to the first year members. On the evening before the match, as Mana runs into Ai and Joe, who gives Ai a new Cure Loveads, they are confronted by Bel. With Mana unable to transform in front of Joe, Bel injures Joe and kidnaps Ai, requesting that she come alone to the docks the next day to battle him. When Mana doesn't show up to the softball match, the first year members ask to take her place. Meanwhile, Mana struggles against Bel, who uses the environment to his advantage, but is aided by the arrival of the other PreCures, who were informed of the situation by Alice's butler, Sebastian. However, Bel then swallows a Dark Psyche, transforming himself into a Cellphone Beast Jikochu that proves immune to the Cures' attacks. As Bel attempts to launch an attack at Ai, her Cure Lovead glows, granting the Cures a new power, the Love Heart Arrow, allowing them to defeat Bel. Returning to the match, Mana gives the softball team her support, helping them win the game with a strike out.
12	"Mana's Decision! I'll Take On an Apprentice!"; Transliteration: "Mana no Ketsui! Atashi Deshi o Torimasu!" (Japanese: マナの決意！あたし弟子をとります！)	April 21, 2013
A boy named Jun Saotome asks Mana to let him be her apprentice, wanting to become helpful like she is. Mana accepts and has Jun accompany her as she helps teachers and students across the school. They also stop by the Solitaire antique shop, where Joe gives him a green Lovead. However, Jun feels that he is unable to live up to Mana's strength and ends up being targeted by Ira, who swallows his Psyche to become an Elephant Beast Jikochu. As Ira's strength overwhelms the PreCures, they explain how Mana got to where she was with the help of others. This allows Jun to hold back the Jikochu's will, giving the PreCures the chance to defeat it. Afterwards, Jun decides to become the school's florist, providing smiles to the other students. Meanwhile, a mysterious girl watches over the girls.
13	"Finally Found!? A Clue About the Princess!"; Transliteration: "Tsui ni Hakken!? Ōjo-sama no Tegakari!" (Japanese: ついに発見!?王女様の手がかり！)	April 28, 2013
As Makoto remembers Ange love of roses, Mana and the others enter a Rose Lady contest, which is offering a rare Royal Yellow rose as the grand prize. On the way, they encounter the mysterious girl, who takes a peculiar interest in them. During the contest, Alice's childhood friend and rival, Reina Itsutsuboshi, constantly tries to interfere with the girls in an attempt to provoke Alice to become angry and get disqualified, but Alice manages to remain calm throughout. For the final, Alice and Reina face off in a tennis match, where Reina attempts to make Alice mad by having her groupies blind her and pour mud over her friends. However, Alice manages to stay calm and win the match. As Reina becomes jealous of Alice's friends, she is targeted by Marmo who becomes a Rose Beast Jikochu and ensnares the PreCures. Thankfully, Alice's determination to protect her friends helps free them, allowing them to defeat Marmo. When the Royal Yellow rose they win is touched by Ai, it produces a mysterious crystal. Meanwhile, back at the Jikochu hideout, the mysterious girl is revealed to be King Jikochu's daughter, Regina.
14	"The Dream or the Promise! Rikka's Many Worries!"; Transliteration: "Yume ka Yakusoku ka! Rikka Ōi ni Nayamu!" (Japanese: 夢か約束か！六花おおいに悩む！)	May 5, 2013
Makoto and Davie suspect that the crystal they received from the rose is one of five Royal Crystals that will awaken a great power when assembled. Meanwhile, Rikka is a little depressed when she ranks second in the test scores, which she constantly ranked first at every test, whilst her mother notices some curious behaviour from her recently. As Mana and the others look into it, they discover Rikka has taken an interest in competitive karuta, which has affected her studies a little. Feeling she should stop karuta to focus on her studies, Rikka decides she should test her skills in a match against the Karuta Queen before quitting, so Mana and the others help her with both her karuta practise and her studies. On the day of the tournament however, Ira targets the Queen, who feels irritated over not having a worthy King, and becomes a Karuta Beast Jikochu. The Queen's desires override the Jikochu and challenges the PreCures to a large-scale karuta match. Putting her practise into good use, Rikka manages to turn around the match, allowing Mana to purify the Jikochu. Following the tournament, Rikka receives a set of karuta cards from the Queen which, when touched by Ai, brings forth a blue Royal Crystal. Afterwards, Rikka is greeted by her mother, who assures her she can keep playing karuta as a hobby, as well as her father, who has come back from his travels.
15	"Really Busy! Makoto's Idol Days!"; Transliteration: "Ō Isogashi! Makoto no Aidoru na Hibi!" (Japanese: 大いそがし！真琴のアイドルな日々！)	May 12, 2013
Makoto is particularly busy as she is cast as the lead role in a film adaptation of Snow White, believing it to be another clue to Ange's whereabouts. Despite the others showing up for support, Makoto has trouble focusing on her acting due to her desire to find Ange, which leads her to be scorned by her co-star, Tamaki Ootori, who had been seriously rehearsing her role. After hearing that Makoto had been spending her nights searching for Ange, Mana and the others decide to take over her patrol so she can focus on her acting. However, on the last day of shooting, Regina appears and uses her power to force Tamaki to give birth to a Mirror Jikochu, which proves resistant to even the Love Heart Arrow attacks. As Makoto realises they need to combine their strengths, Ai gives the PreCures new Cure Loveads, which allow them to perform their new group attack, Lovely Force Arrow, which defeats the Jikochu. After Regina introduces herself to the PreCures and takes her leave, Tamaki awards Makoto with her battered script, which brings forth the third Royal Crystal.
16	"Regina's Fierce Attack! Mana is Mine!"; Transliteration: "Rejīna Mō Atakku! Mana wa Atashi no Mono!" (Japanese: レジーナ猛アタック！マナはあたしのモノ！)	May 19, 2013
Becoming interested in Mana, Regina appears before her, wanting to make her her friend. Despite Makoto and Rikka's objections, Mana agrees to be her friend, which upsets Makoto. This soon proves to be quite troublesome as Regina keeps asking Mana to play with her during school, causing havoc with her powers, and being rude to her other friends. As Rikka and Alice try to explain Mana's reasons for befriending Regina to Makoto, Regina becomes annoyed of Mana thinking of her other friends and decides to get rid of them by creating a Drinks Can Jikochu to attack them. Mana soon arrives on the scene, telling Regina that being true friends means being honest with each other instead of telling them what to do. After the PreCures defeat the Jikochu, Mana states that she would still earnestly want to become Regina's friend, but manages to make up with Makoto regardless, whilst Regina ponders the meaning of a "true friend".
17	"Shock! The Stolen Crystal!"; Transliteration: "Shokku! Ubawareta Kurisutaru!" (Japanese: ショック！奪われたクリスタル！)	May 26, 2013
Whilst visiting a forest sculpture gallery in hopes of finding another clue, the girls once again encounter Regina, who wants to try to be friends with Mana again. Mana agrees to let her join them on the condition that she be friends with the others as well. Makoto comes across a statue that reminds her strongly of Ange, whilst Joe briefly pops by and leaves Ai with the others. When Mana presumes the red stone embedded in the statue could be a Royal Crystal, Regina destroys the statue in order to obtain the stone for her, which gets Mana and the others in trouble with the gallery manager. The sculptor, Hitomi, who shows no bad will, explains to the girls that he was inspired to design the statue like that after picking up the red stone. Noticing how Mana and the others took responsibility for her mistake, Regina states her earnest wish to be their friend, which transforms the stone into a red Royal Crystal. Just then, Regina suddenly changes personalities and desires the other Royal Crystals, targeting Hitomi to create a Sculptor Jikochu that turns Makoto, Rikka and Alice into statues. As Mana struggles to protect the Royal Crystals, Joe suddenly appears in the guise of a knight to protect her, as well as help her turn the others back to normal, allowing them to defeat the Jikochu. As Regina escapes with the red Royal Crystal, Joe reveals himself to be Jonathan Klondike, a knight of the Trump Kingdom and Ange's fiancée.
18	"Appear! The Last Royal Crystal!"; Transliteration: "Shutsugen! Saigo no Roiyaru Kurisutaru!" (Japanese: 出現！さいごのロイヤルクリスタル！)	June 2, 2013
After Joe explains what he knows about the Royal Crystals, he takes the girls with him on a train ride, which he believes to be another clue that could lead them to the remaining Royal Crystal. Whilst stopping by a field of flowers, Joe tells Mana about how he and Ange came to fall in love. After the Jikochu attacked the Trump Kingdom, he followed Ange to the human world. Just then, Regina targets a young boy and creates a Train Jikochu. As Joe fends off Regina, the PreCures chase after the Jikochu and defeat it before it can destroy the field of flowers. The girls then receive a Royal Crystal from the train, leaving just the one that Regina stole.
19	"Betting the Crystals! Jikochu's Game!"; Transliteration: "Kurisutaru o Kakete! Jikochū no Gēmu!" (Japanese: クリスタルをかけて！ジコチューのゲーム！)	June 9, 2013
Regina appears before the girls and proposes a game with all the Royal Crystals at stake, which Mana accepts, hoping to find a way to retrieve the remaining crystal without fighting. The girls are transported to a specially prepared game world where Regina and the Jikochu Trio await. The first match is a penalty shootout, which the Jikochu manage to win by replacing the ball and goal with Jikochu. The PreCures protest against the matches being unfair to them and biased to the Jikochu Trio due to the objects used being Jikochu, but Regina tells them that this is her game and she makes the rules. Makoto wishes to protest further, but the challenge is accepted by Mana, who still believes that Regina is her friend and can resolve the issue without fighting. The next match is bowling, which the PreCures manage to win thanks to Mana's tactics and Ai's magic. The final match is a game of dodgeball, which the Cures win after the Jikochu group knock themselves out whilst fighting with each other. However, Regina breaks her promise and summons a Purse Jikochu to attack the PreCures, but they manage to defeat it and escape the game world. Regina takes the other crystals, but when assembled with hers, they suddenly shoot off into the sky.
20	"The Crystal's Guidance! To the Princess!"; Transliteration: "Kurisutaru no Michibiki! Ōjo-sama no Moto e!" (Japanese: クリスタルの導き！王女様のもとへ！)	June 16, 2013
With Sebastian's help, the girls, along with Joe, head towards some snowy mountains where the crystals were last spotted. Arriving at the top of the mountain, they encounter Regina and the Jikochu Trio, who are also searching for the crystals. In the ensuing battle, both Mana and Regina end up falling through a crack in the mountain and wind up in a cave. There, the crystals appear and reveal the location of Ange, who is trapped in ice, before losing their power, bringing Regina back to her senses. Although she curiously finds her own powers have stopped working, she manages to reaffirm her friendship with Mana. As the others arrive, the Jikochu Trio send in a Snowman Jikochu to get in their way. Although the PreCures manage to defeat the Jikochu, the Jikochu Trio capture both Ange and Regina.
21	"To the Trump Kingdom! Rescue the Princess!"; Transliteration: "Toranpu Ōkoku e! Ōjo-sama o Sukue!" (Japanese: トランプ王国へ！王女様を救え！)	June 23, 2013
With help from Ai and the Royal Crystals, the PreCures find a way to travel to the Trump Kingdom. There, the Jikochu Trio bring Ange before King Jikochu, but are unable to break her out of her protective barrier. When the Trio announce their plan to turn everyone in the human world into Jikochu, Regina voices her objection, angering King Jikochu who strikes her down and seals off her powers. When the PreCures arrive in the Trump Kingdom, they fight off the Trio and an army of Jikochu whilst Mana heads towards Regina. There, they are both attacked by a Spider Jikochu, who leaves them above a lava pit dangling on a thread not strong enough to carry them both. Finally learning her true feelings towards Mana, Regina lets herself drop so that Mana can survive. However, Mana saves her just in time, refusing to give up and saying that in order to protect everyone, she can become stronger than even Regina's father. Regina's admiration of this speech allows her to break free from her seal, allowing her to fly Mana to safety whilst the PreCures defeat the Jikochu army, escaping back to the human world with Regina and Ange in tow.
22	"Appearing in a Pinch! The New Warrior Cure Ace!"; Transliteration: "Pinchi ni Tōjō! Aratana Senshi Kyua Ēsu!" (Japanese: ピンチに登場！新たな戦士キュアエース！)	June 30, 2013
After leaving the still imprisoned Ange with Joe in a secret hideout, Mana takes Regina to stay at her house. Whilst enjoying time with Mana's family, Regina laments that she doesn't remember spending much time with her father. The next day, Regina joins Mana and the others on a picnic to the beach, where they are soon discovered by the Jikochu Trio. As the PreCures take a beating from the Trio, Regina feels a pain in her chest, which an illusion of King Jikochu reveals to be from feeling love. King Jikochu tries to sway Regina away from these feelings, using Dark Energy to put her under his control again. The PreCures attempt to try to get her to remember her true feelings, but Mana's hesitation in using the Lovely Force Arrow against her leads to them getting defeated. Before Regina can strike the final blow, the PreCures are rescued by another warrior, Cure Ace.
23	"Take Back the Love! The Five Vows of Precures!"; Transliteration: "Ai o Torimodose! Purikyua Itsutsu no Chikai!" (Japanese: 愛を取り戻せ！プリキュア5つの誓い！)	July 7, 2013
Cure Ace overwhelms Regina in battle, forcing the Jikochu Trio to retreat with her. As Mana laments not being strong enough to protect Regina, Cure Ace confiscates her Cure Lovead, saying she will need to regain her love in order to get it back. Back in the Trump Kingdom, the Jikochu Deputies, Leva and Gula, join the antagonist group. Following the incident, Mana shuts herself in her room, so Rikka and the others offer to help their family out at a flea market in her place. As Mana remains depressed, Ai appears at her house, having used a magical spell to make her family believe she is Mana's sister, and manages to cheer Mana up enough to get her out of the house to explore the festival. There, she meets a peculiar girl who seems to know her well. Just then, Leva and Gula target two boys wanting Makoto's autograph and creates a pair of Autograph Jikochu. Upon hearing about this, Mana decides to head there even without her Lovead, realising her troubles shouldn't get in the way of what's important. After Mana manages to fight back the Jikochu with her own strength, the girl from before returns her Cure Lovead, revealing herself to be Cure Ace, and together they defeat the Jikochu. After the battle, Cure Ace tells the PreCures that their mission has only just begun.
24	"Shock! MakoPi Declares Her Idol Retirement!"; Transliteration: "Shōgeki! Makopī Aidoru Intai Sengen!" (Japanese: 衝撃！まこぴーアイドル引退宣言！)	July 14, 2013
As Makoto wonders if she should continue being an idol now that she's found the princess, Cure Ace, who formally introduces herself as Aguri Madoka, tells Makoto that she feels her heart is wavering, claiming she isn't giving her all in neither singing or being a PreCure. Feeling she has no reason to sing, Makoto decides she should quit singing altogether, planning to announce her retirement at her next concert. Not liking this idea, Mana and the others try to convince her about the joy of singing, to little avail. On the day of the concert, Leva targets a reporter and creates a Microphone Jikochu. Meanwhile, Makoto receives a Mirror Lovead from Ai which allows her to speak with Ange, who tells her to sing for herself. Finally becoming honest with her own feelings, Makoto rekindles her love of singing and beats the Jikochu alongside Aguri.
25	"Brilliant Transformation! Appearance of a New Heroine!?"; Transliteration: "Karei na Henshin! Nyū Hiroin Tōjō!?" (Japanese: 華麗な変身！ニューヒロイン登場!?)	July 21, 2013
Alice becomes downhearted after her shield breaks during a battle against a Jikochu, feeling she would've been unable to protect the others were it not for Aguri. As Alice strives to become stronger, Sebastian develops an Artificial Commune so that he can become a superhero and assist Alice. However, he ends up mixing his luggage with Marmo, who ends up using the Commune to become a superheroine, naming herself Cutie Madame. She soon starts making a name for herself by rescuing people from accidents she herself caused on purpose to attract large crowds and become famous. After Sebastian fails to obtain the Commune from Marmo, he confesses everything to Alice, who assures her that he helps her just the way he is. Finding Marmo abusing her power at an amusement park, Alice fights against her, with her determination to help Sebastian helping her find her own love, allowing her to use her shield to reflect Marmo's attack back at her and destroy the Commune.
26	"What Are My True Feelings? Rikka Worries Once Again!"; Transliteration: "Honto no Kimochi wa? Rikka Matamata Nayamu!" (Japanese: ホントの気持ちは？六花またまた悩む！)	July 28, 2013
Following a class about people's ambitions, Rikka worries about whether she really wanted to grow up to be a doctor, or if it was just out of admiration for her mother. That night, Ira is suddenly struck by lightning during one of his flights and falls into the sea. The next day, Rikka and Raquel find him washed up on the beach, later discovering he has developed amnesia. Feeling she shouldn't leave him alone, Rikka takes him to her house to treat his injuries. As the other girls learn of this, Aguri sees him as a potential threat and prepares to fight him, but Rikka stands in her way, with the others standing by her decision. Just then, Gula attacks, during which Ira bangs his head and regains his memories. Despite this, Ira chooses to help the PreCures dodge Gula's attack, whilst Rikka, who comes to understand the power of believing in one's self and having no regrets, teams up with Aguri to fend off Gula. As Ira returns to the Jikochu's team, Rikka reaffirms her dream to become a doctor.
27	"Discovered!? Cure Ace's Weakness!"; Transliteration: "Barechatta!? Kyua Ēsu no Jakuten!" (Japanese: バレちゃった!?キュアエースの弱点！)	August 4, 2013
Mana and the others make a delivery to a friend of her mother's, Mari Madoka, who just so happens to be Aguri's grandmother who she is keeping Cure Ace a secret from. Aguri invites Mana and the other's to Mari's open air tea ceremony, where they learn a bit more about Aguri's less serious side. Aguri explains she was a PreCure who had previously been defeated by the Jikochu, which resulted in Ai, her partner, being reverted to an egg. Wanting to stop King Jikochu from conquering various worlds, Aguri became determined to make the other PreCures stronger so they can defeat him. Just then, Leva and Gula combine their strengths to create a giant Barbecue Jikochu. Aguri attempts to finish off the Jikochu quickly but ends up failing, exposing her weakness that she can only remain transformed for five minutes. Thankfully, the other PreCures manage to stop the Jikochu before it can harm Mari.
28	"My Heart is Pounding! Aguri's Summer Vacation!"; Transliteration: "Mune ga Dokidoki! Aguri no Natsuyasumi!" (Japanese: 胸がドキドキ！亜久里の夏休み！)	August 11, 2013
As Aguri faints from overexerting herself due to her non-stop training, her classmate Eru Morimoto tells Mana and the others about how she is very responsible, but also seems rather lonely as she does not seem to have any friends her age. Wanting Aguri and Eru to get along, Mana suggests they all go to the summer festival, hoping to teach Aguri that spending time with friends is just as important as being a PreCure. Whilst initially lured by the idea of "super special delicious sweets", Aguri enjoys spending time with Eru and the others, coming to realise that the sweets taste best when eaten with friends. Just then, Leva and Gula create a Summer Festival Jikochu to target Aguri, but Eru manages to help her out, wanting to repay her for protecting her from some bullies at school. As Aguri joins the fight, Leva and Gula attempt to trap her until her time limit runs out, but her newfound love and desire to protect Eru and her friends helps her power up and break free, allowing her to defeat the Jikochu.
29	"For Mana's Sake! Sharuru's Great Transformation!"; Transliteration: "Mana no Tame ni! Sharuru Dai Henshin!" (Japanese: マナのために！シャルル大変身！)	August 18, 2013
Wanting to be more useful to Mana, Sharuru, along with Raquel and Lance, ask Davie to teach them how to transform into human form. After they each learn to transform, Sharuru is eager to help out with Mana's student council duties. However, whilst Sharuru undertakes a delivery to another school on Mana's behalf, encountering various delays on the way, Leva and Gula create a Volleyball Jikochu at the school, with Mana unable to transform without Sharuru, who is unable to detect the Jikochu's presence in her human form. As Mana searches for Sharuru, the other PreCures fight against the Jikochu, who proves more than resilient due to its two faces preventing it from being purified easily. Managing to find Sharuru, Mana returns just in time so that the PreCures and Aguri can attack the Jikochu from both sides and defeat it. Although Sharuru feels guilty about putting the others in danger, Mana and the others are pleased to hear about the good deeds Sharuru performed. With the bond with their fairies strengthened, Aguri informs the girls that they must take one final test.
30	"The Final Trial! The Legendary Precure!"; Transliteration: "Saigo no Shiren! Densetsu no Purikyua!" (Japanese: 最後の試練！伝説のプリキュア！)	September 1, 2013
The Cures fly to a remote island, where Aguri intends to have them acquire the Magical Lovely Pad, one of three mystical items, including Ange's Miracle Dragon Glaive, that were used by legendary PreCures who saved the world from darkness 10,000 years ago. Arriving at the island, the girls meet the Lovely Pad's guardian, an elderly fairy named Melan, who tests the Cures by transforming into a powerful dragon. The PreCures fight against her but are completely defeated. Aguri, downhearted by her loss, states that she became a PreCure and sought the other's help so she could have the strength to obtain the Lovely Pad. Not wanting to give up so easily, Mana makes curry for everyone, encouraging them to try again. Fighting again, the PreCures manage to break through Melan's barrier by lending their power to Alice, though miss their chance to take advantage due to Aguri's time limit. However, Mana keeps on fighting till the very end, reminding Melan of the unrelenting spirit of her former partner, Cure Empress. Although the PreCures don't manage to fully defeat Melan, she admires their strength and gives them the legendary mirror, the Lovely Pad.
31	"Oogai Town is in a Big Pinch! The Lovely Pad is Born!"; Transliteration: "Ōgai-chō Dai Pinchi! Tanjō! Raburī Paddo" (Japanese: 大貝町大ピンチ！誕生！ラブリーパッド)	September 8, 2013
Whilst taking a break from figuring out how to utilise the Lovely Pad, the girls are shocked to find their families, along with everyone in Oogai Town, have fallen into sleeping comas. These are revealed to be the work of dark seeds spread by Leva and Gula, which will eventually darken their hearts and turn them into Jikochu, providing enough energy to awaken King Jikochu. The PreCures confront Leva and Gula, who combine into a powerful form, overwhelming them and crushing the Lovely Pad into pieces which causes Mana to Have an Emotional Breakdown. After letting out her frustrations, Mana regains her determination, encouraging the others to fight back. Their feelings transform the mirror's pieces into five new Lovely Pads, which allows the PreCures to lend their power to Mana and perform the Lovely Straight Flush, defeating Leva and Gula and restoring everyone in town to normal. As the girls enjoy a meal with their families, Bel eliminates Leva and Gula by absorbing their energy.
32	"Mana Collapses! A Stormy Culture Festival"; Transliteration: "Mana Taoreru! Arashi no Bunkasai" (Japanese: マナ倒れる！嵐の文化祭)	September 15, 2013
Whilst preparing for the school culture festival, Mana ends up catching a fever from being overworked and is ordered by Rikka to take the next day off. After hearing Rikka liken Mana to The Happy Prince, Aguri is shocked to learn the character doesn't have such a happy ending in his book, as he overspread his kindness until he was nothing but a heart of lead. Meanwhile, Bel gives Ira and Marmo new items called Blood Rings made from Leva and Gula's Janergy, putting them under his command. The next day, as Mana ignores doctor's orders and tries to help out, Aguri, worried that Mana will have the same fate the Happy Prince, forces her to rest and hazes the other students for relying on others too much. When the festival's campfire ends up falling apart after a student climbs on it, all of the students unite to put it back together, giving their thanks to Aguri for helping them sort out matters on their own. Just then, Ira targets a noisy customer, using the power of the Blood Ring to create a stronger Coffee Cup Jikochu, which makes the PreCures dizzy. Coming to understanding that, unlike the Happy Prince, Mana has the full support of her fellow students, Aguri uses her Lovely Pad to buy enough time for everyone to recover and defeat the Jikochu. With the evening's campfire dance going as planned, Mana gives her thanks to Aguri for worrying about her.
33	"Alice's Father Appears! Yotsuba Family Stay Meeting!"; Transliteration: "Arisu Papa Tōjō! Yotsuba-ke Otomarikai!" (Japanese: ありすパパ登場！四葉家おとまり会！)	September 22, 2013
As the girls have a sleepover at Alice's mansion, her father, who is often away on business, comes home. Alice tells the others of how she first came to meet Mana and Rikka when she was six. Having encountered her after stumbling into her garden, Mana and Rikka invited Alice, who had a frail body, out to play several times, making a promise to make a secret hideout. However, after Alice caught a fever, her father made plans to move her abroad to somewhere better for her health. Hearing Alice's wishes to stay with her friends, Mana and Rikka, with help from Sebastian, staged a rescue effort using the mansion's various traps and hidden passageways. Although they were eventually caught, Alice's father noted how much better her health had gotten since making friends with Mana and Rikka and decided to let her stay with them. Back in the present, Marmo targets a helicopter pilot to create a Helicopter Jikochu. After saving her father, Alice, remembering the words Mana gave her back then, single-handedly takes on the Jikochu before defeating it with the others. Seeing off her father, Alice returns to telling the others her story.
34	"Being a Mama is Super Tough! Unhappy Ai-chan!"; Transliteration: "Mama wa Chō Taihen! Fukigen Ai-chan!" (Japanese: ママはチョーたいへん！ふきげんアイちゃん！)	September 29, 2013
During a battle against Ira and Marmo, Ai suddenly starts crying, which causes Ira and Marmo to feel a surge of energy. As the girls struggle to cheer Ai up, Mana and Rikka hear from their respectives mother about how they were as babies. Having heard how much her mother appreciated having her, Rikka helps Mana look after a crying Ai during the night. The next day, as the girls take Ai to the park, Ira creates a Motorbike Jikochu, which grows stronger with Ai's frightened cries. Coming to understand Ai's fear, Rikka manages to calm her down, weakening the Jikochu and allowing the PreCures to defeat it. As the girls wonder how Ai's cries resulted in the Jikochu growing stronger, they are contacted by Ange.
35	"No No Ai-chan! The Big Toothbrushing Plan!"; Transliteration: "Iya Iya Ai-chan! Hamigaki Daisakusen!" (Japanese: いやいやアイちゃん！歯みがき大作戦！)	October 6, 2013
Ange explains that Ai is not only someone who gives the PreCures power, but also serves as a shield to protect people's hearts from the Jikochu. With Ai entering her impulsive stage, Ange informs the girls that they will need to raise properly, lest she lose her powers and allow the Jikochu to gain power. Discovering that Ai has grown her first baby teeth, the girls start training her to brush her teeth, only to discover that Makoto, who was unaware of the existence of cavities, has one herself. The girls take Makoto to the dentist to get it treated, but becomes scared of the dentist's instruments and runs off. As the girls try to convince Makoto to get her cavity treated, Marmo creates a Cavity Jikochu that Makoto is too afraid to fight against, which in turn causes Ai to cry and power up the Jikochu. Receiving some encouragement from Aguri, who reminds her of Ange, Makoto manages to overcome her fear and help defeat the Jikochu. Afterwards, Makoto gets her cavity fixed and encourages Ai to take care of her teeth.
36	"Raquel's in High Spirits! The Power of First Love, Full Throttle!"; Transliteration: "Rakeru Harikiru! Hatsukoi Pawā Zenkai!" (Japanese: ラケルはりきる！初恋パワー全開！)	October 13, 2013
As Sharuru and Raquel help Mana and Rikka out in their human forms, a girl named Yashima comes in searching for a lost rabbit, which Raquel manages to find. After being thanked by Yashima, Raquel develops a heavy crush on her and decides to spend more time with her. Whilst Yashima takes Raquel for a boat ride on a lake, Marmo targets a jealous school girl and creates a Swan Jikochu, which starts tainting the lake. As the preCures arrive on the scene, Raquel's determination to protect the scenery Yashima loves pushes him to actually take on the Jikochu himself, before the Cures help defeat it. However, Raquel is saddened to learn Yashima already has a boyfriend, but Rikka manages to cheer him up.
37	"Fix That Pickiness! Carrots vs. Aguri!"; Transliteration: "Naose Suki Kirai! Ninjin tai Aguri!" (Japanese: なおせ好きキライ!ニンジンVS亜久里!)	October 20, 2013
Whilst teaching Ai not to be fussy about eating carrots, the girls notice Aguri isn't fond of carrots either. Feeling this may be a bad influence on Ai, the girls attempt to teach Aguri to like carrots with not much success. Hearing about a farmer named Aki who provides the Pig's Tail restaurant with carrots, Mana and the others take Aguri to his carrot field, where she learns about the love that goes into growing each carrot. However, Ira appears and creates a Gingerbread House Jikochu, trapping Aguri and Ai inside and using carrot monsters to scare Ai. Understanding the feelings behind carrots, Aguri overcomes her pickiness and takes a bite of carrot, filling her with power and allowing her and Ai to escape the house and defeat the Jikochu. As both Aguri and Ai find they like carrots after all, Regina awakens from her slumber.
38	"Bel's Scheme! Ai-chan Becomes a Jikochu!?"; Transliteration: "Bēru no Takurami! Ai-chan Jikochū ni Naru!?" (Japanese: ベールのたくらみ！アイちゃんジコチューになる！？)	October 27, 2013
Believing they'll be able to increase their power if they turn Ai into a Jikochu, Bel and the others use finger puppets to encourage Ai to play around at night. This results in Ai rekindling some of her rebellious behavior the next day. This carries on for several days as the Jikochu Trio spoil Ai and make her less well behaved. After Sharuru spots Ai coming home early in the morning, Mana receives a letter of challenge from Bel calling her and the others to an abandoned factory, where they find Ai completely tempted by the Jikochu, giving the Trio more power. As Mana tries to bring Ai back to her senses, they are both trapped under a collapsed chimney caused by Ai's cries. After Mana reminds her of all the times they've spend together, Ai manages to cleanse the darkness in her heart, giving Aguri a boost in her power and allowing her to beat Ira and Marmo. Bel takes their Blood Rings to power himself, but the Cures manage to overpower him, destroying the Blood Rings in the process. As the girls contemplate that they may be ready to face King Jikochu, Regina returns to take command of the Jikochu Trio.
39	"I've Come to See You! Regina Returns!"; Transliteration: "Ai ni Kita yo! Rejīna Futatabi!" (Japanese: 会いに来たよ！レジーナふたたび！)	November 10, 2013
Joe seemingly returns from hiding, telling the others that the key to awakening Ange may very well be her weapon, the Miracle Dragon Glaive, which currently lies in the Trump Kingdom. He escorts the girls to the Trump Kingdom and leads them through secret pathways, though the fairies start to grow suspicious of him. Upon arriving at the Dragon Glaive, the girls reveal that they were aware Joe was actually Bel in disguise, who was secretly trying to get them to remove the glaive from its resting spot, and just played along to get to the Trump Kingdom. Bel calls forth an Octopus Jikochu to fight the Cures, who find they are also unable to remove the glaive. Just then, Regina appears before Mana, who stands firm in her resolve to talk things through with her. However, the darkness within Regina fights back with her Janergy, powering up the Jikochu in the process. Although the Cures manage to defeat the Jikochu, Regina is suddenly able to take the glaive for herself, forcing the Cures to retreat back home.
40	"Feelings that I Want to Convey! MakoP's New Song Announced!"; Transliteration: "Todoketai Omoi! Makopī Shinkyoku Happyō!" (Japanese: とどけたい思い！まこぴー新曲発表！)	November 17, 2013
Wanting her feelings to reach Regina, Makoto decides to write a new song, but struggles to find the right lyrics, so the others help her out. Working together, they manage to put together a song, which Makoto's producers want her to sing in her next performance. However, on the day of the performance, Regina targets the producer to create a CD Jikochu and trap Makoto. As the others fight against Regina and her group, Makoto decides to sing her song, which starts to have an effect on Regina. With the Cures standing firm in their belief, they bring forth a new power to the Lovely Pad, allowing them to defeat the Jikochu. Although Regina escapes, Aguri assures Makoto that her song was not meaningless.
41	"Alice's Dream! The Flower that Connects Friends"; Transliteration: "Arisu no Yume! Hana ga Tsunaida Tomodachi" (Japanese: ありすの夢！花がつないだともだち)	November 24, 2013
Wanting to fulfil a childhood dream she had, Alice is encouraged by her friends to set up her own flower shop at the flea market. However, Reina sets up her own flower shop to compete against hers. Although Reina initially attracts more business with her boastful range of flowers, Alice starts to appeal to customers with her salesman skills. Just then, Regina appears and wilts all the flowers, but Alice and Reina manage to save a few small sproutlings, with Alice recalling how it was Reina who taught her how to take care of flowers. They soon discover the cause of the wilting is a Tree Jikochu that Regina has put into orbit. Thus, Alice decides to heads off into space to confront Regina and try and show her the beauty of flowers. When Regina resists, the other Cures come to help Alice with assistance from Reina, who learned of Alice's identity. As Alice defends Regina's attacks, her love for the cosmos flower starts to reach Regina, allowing the Cures to defeat the Jikochu, restoring all the plants to normal. Reconfirming her friendship with Reina, Alice resolves to work harder to protect everyone's smiles.
42	"Let's Celebrate! The First Birthday!"; Transliteration: "Minna de Iwaō! Hajimete no Tanjōbi!" (Japanese: みんなで祝おう！はじめての誕生日！)	December 1, 2013
Aguri keeps having dreams about Ange facing off against King Jikochu. Meanwhile, Mana and the others learn from Mana's mother that Aguri was actually adopted by Mari and doesn't know when her own birthday is. Thus, Mana decides to hold a surprise birthday party for Aguri, who never had a party before. However, the party is soon interrupted by Regina and Ira, who use an Ant Jikochu to turn Mana's family into stone. Invigorated by Mana's feelings, Aguri helps the Cures to defeat the Jikochu, allowing the party to resume.
43	"To My Most Important Person! Aguri's Class Visit!"; Transliteration: "Taisetsu na Hito e! Aguri no Jugyō Sankan!" (Japanese: たいせつな人へ！亜久里の授業参観！)	December 8, 2013
Following another battle with the Jikochu, Aguri is spotted by Mari as she transforms back from being Cure Ace. Later that night, Mari tries to explain to Aguri that she always knew of her role as Cure Ace. She reveals how, one year ago, she discovered Aguri as a baby that had fallen from the sky, who suddenly transformed into the form of a ten-year-old when a Jikochu appeared before them, with a mysterious voice asking Mari to take care of her. Upon hearing this, Aguri suddenly becomes anxious and runs off to Mana's house, where she finds herself facing a lot of questions about her memory of fighting a Jikochu, the dreams she had been having about Ange, and just who she really is. With Aguri unable to face Mari, Mana and the others decide to have her sleep over for the night, helping her remember what's important. The next day, as Mari shows up for a parent's visit at Aguri's school, Regina creates an Eraser Jikochu to erase all of the children's drawings of their most important people. Aguri gets upset when the Jikochu erases her drawing, but Mari stands up for her, assuring her that her feelings have been received, giving her the strength to beat the Jikochu and restore the drawings, before returning home with Mari.
44	"Jikochu's Trap! A Christmas Without Mana"; Transliteration: "Jikochū no Wana! Mana no Inai Kurisumasu" (Japanese: ジコチューの罠！マナのいないクリスマス)	December 15, 2013
Mana is approached about a Student Council President Speech Contest, which unfortunately takes place on Christmas Eve. Despite Mana's objections, Rikka urges her to go ahead with the contest and fills in for her student council duties in her stead. However, the speech contest turns out to be a trap set by Regina, who traps Mana in a cage, believing that without Mana as their lynch pin, the other Cures will be easily defeated. Meanwhile, Rikka, unaware of Mana's situation, finds encouragement in Mana's notes, but ultimately starts to feel lonely without her. Regina and the Trio then attack the girls with a Christmas Tree Jikochu. However, they are surprised to find the Cures remain strong even without Mana around, because their hearts are always connected. Rikka also manages to get Regina to admit she still loves Mana, who is rescued by Joe and joins the Cures in defeating the Jikochu.
45	"The Destined Showdown! Ace vs. Regina"; Transliteration: "Shukumei no Taiketsu! Ēsu tai Rejīna" (Japanese: 宿命の対決！エースVSレジーナ)	December 22, 2013
Joe reveals he has found one of the three legendary treasures, the Eternal Golden Crown. When Aguri touches the crown, she is suddenly flooded with memories containing the truth of what happened in the Trump Kingdom. Aguri calls together Makoto and Joe in private, revealing that Ange was never trapped inside the crystal to begin with and telling them everything she learned. Believing she herself is fated to fight against Regina, Aguri takes Makoto and Joe to the Trump Kingdom and confronts Regina, wagering her Golden Crown against Regina's Dragon Glaive. As the two girls push each other to their very limits, with Makoto and Joe unable to do anything but spectate, Bel sends some Jikochu to attack them in their weakened states, but Mana, Rikka, and Alice, who had learned of Aguri's sudden disappearance from Eru, arrive to save Aguri and Regina. After the Jikochu are defeated, Aguri states that it is her destiny to fight Regina, revealing to Mana and the others that she and Regina are the light and darkness of Marie Ange.
46	"Ace and Regina! The Truth Behind Their Birth!"; Transliteration: "Ēsu to Rejīna! Tanjō no Shinjitsu!" (Japanese: エースとレジーナ！誕生の真実！)	January 5, 2014
Using the Golden Crown, Aguri shows Mana, Regina, and the others the history of the Trump Kingdom. Ange, whose mother died shortly after her birth, was raised lovingly by her father, the King. One day, Ange was struck by a deadly illness caused by a blob of darkness. In order to save her life, the King broke free the Golden Crown, which was used by the legendary Pretty Cure to seal away a dark evil, in order to obtain the knowledge to cure her. Although Ange was able to be cured, the darkness escaped and enveloped the King, transforming him into King Jikochu, forcing Ange to seal him using the Dragon Glaive. After helping Makoto to escape to the human world, Ange was cornered by Bel, who attempted to turn her into a Jikochu. In order to prevent that, Ange split her psyche in half, separating her love for her kingdom and her love for her father, which would become Regina and Aguri, whilst she herself reverted to an egg which would eventually become Ai. After everything has been revealed to them, Regina decides to side with King Jikochu, who is awakened from his slumber. With King Jikochu and Regina arriving in the human world to try and destroy it, Mana and the others stand to defend it.
47	"Cure Heart's Decision! The Promise that I Want to Protect!"; Transliteration: "Kyua Hāto no Ketsui! Mamoritai Yakusoku!" (Japanese: キュアハートの決意！まもりたい約束！)	January 12, 2014
Oogai watches on as the Cures fight against the Jikochu. Rikka, Alice, and Makoto fight against the Jikochu Trio whilst Mana goes with Aguri to try and talk to King Jikochu. Although Bel tries to bring the others down by stating the selfishness in people's hearts will cause Oogai to end up just like the Trump Kingdom, the city's people instead show the strong power of their hearts as they help each other to evacuate. Regina soon fights against Mana, who stands firm in her love for her, reminding them they are always friends. When King Jikochu attacks them, Regina protects Mana, unleashing the Dragon Glaive's true power and finally accepting her feelings of love for both Mana and her father. With Aguri's help, the three of them begin the fight to restore the love in King Jikochu's heart.
48	"Heart-Pounding Full Throttle! Precure vs. King Jikochu!"; Transliteration: "Dokidoki Zenkai! Purikyua vs. Kingu Jikochū!" (Japanese: ドキドキ全開！プリキュアVSキングジコチュー！)	January 19, 2014
Learning that the Trump Kingdom's King is trapped inside King Jikochu's heart, Mana decides they need to venture inside King Jikochu to rescue him. In the process, she casually blurts out her identity to the public, who give their support to the Cures as they break through the Jikochu's defenses and head inside King Jikochu's body. As Alice, Rikka, and Makoto stay behind to fend off the Jikochu, Mana, Aguri, Regina, and Ai arrive at the heart, where they are confronted by several Jikochu Cells. When they are suddenly put in a pinch, the King's love for his family emerges, giving Mana the power to vanquish the cells, allowing Aguri and the others to rescue the King and destroy King Jikochu. However, before the Cures can celebrate their victory, Bel swallows the remaining fragment of King Jikochu to gain his power.
49	"Deliver it to You! My Sweet Heart"; Transliteration: "Anata ni Todoke! Mai Suīto Hāto" (Japanese: あなたに届け！マイスイートハート)	January 26, 2014
Contrary to his plans, Bel is consumed by King Jikochu's power, which transforms into the ultimate being from 10,000 years ago, Proto Jikochu. As the Cures, aided by Regina, struggle to fight against him, Proto Jikochu attempts to use his Janergy to steal Mana's Psyche. However, her Psyche manages to resist the darkness and return to Mana, who combines herself with the power of the Cures and the three treasures to transform into her 'Parthenon Mode', using its power to completely overwhelm Proto Jikochu. Assuring him that love will always be around to resist selfishness, Mana purifies Proto Jikochu, bringing the human world and the Trump Kingdom back to its former glory. Afterwards, the spirit of Ange appears before the girls, stating that, even though she can no longer return to her previous form, she will continue to live on in Ai, Aguri, and Regina. Some time later, Regina joins Mana at school, whilst the Trump Kingdom, which is now connected to the human world, has been made into a republic, with Joe as its president. Meanwhile, Mana, Rikka, Alice, Makoto and Aguri, continue to serve as PreCures, alongside Regina, protecting the world from danger. The series ends with the words "Thank You" on the ending card.

=== Glitter Force Doki Doki (International Netflix/Toei Animation/Saban Brands version) ===
No.	Title	Original release date
1	"A New Adventure"	August 18, 2017
In the magic world of Splendorius, Glitter Spade (referred to in this episode's subtitles as Glitter Flash) fights a losing battle against an enemy. On Earth, the Sea Shell Bay Middle School is on a field trip to visit Clover Tower. Maya Aida, the school's enthusiastic and friendly student council president, quells tensions between her classmates and students from another school. Her best friend Rachel notes that Maya is always going out of her way to help people, which is affirmed when she helps a lost girl and also recovers teen celebrity Mackenzie Mack's charm pin. A shop vendor gives Maya a similar charm as a gift. While waiting in line, one of the students gets upset and becomes influenced by a mysterious enemy Ira. His heart spirit darkens and leaves his body, transforming into a crab monster called a Distain, who causes chaos in the tower. Maya follows it to the observation deck, and tries to dodge its attacks. The girl from the opening scene arrives and defeats the crab, but Ira's partner Marmo summons another crab which captures her. The Splendorius pixie Kippie helps Maya use her charm known as a Glitter Charm and a device called a Glitter Pad to transform her into the superhero Glitter Heart to defeat the crab and to save the girl.
2	"A Diamond in the Rough"	August 18, 2017
Although the pixies ask Maya not to tell anyone about her special powers, Maya convinces them that she needs to tell Rachel, who is happy to learn about it and is willing to help track down the street vendor who gave her the charm and the mysterious warrior. However, Rachel is hesitant to join the Glitter Force as a member as she is neither athletic nor outgoing. But seeing that Maya has always relied on her as a friend, she agrees and becomes Glitter Diamond.
3	"And Clara Makes Three"	August 18, 2017
Lance has gone missing, but it turns out he had bumped into Clara, a friend of Maya and Rachel. Clara reveals that she has knowledge of the Glitter Force as her family owns Clover Tower and the security footage caught Maya transforming. She offers to provide logistical support for the two girls, but refuses to get involved in the fighting because in her past, she had once fought off bullies and is now afraid of hurting others. When Maya and Rachel have to deal with another Distain, Lance convinces Clara that fighting to protect your friends and family is necessary sometimes. Clara agrees to become a magical girl superheroine: Glitter Clover.
4	"The Glitter Spotlight"	August 18, 2017
Maya and the gang go to a television studio to recruit pop star Mackenzie Mack to the Glitter Force, since they know that she is Glitter Spade. Mackenzie refuses to be involved, but has second thoughts when a Distain attacks the studio.
5	"The Spade from Splendorious"	August 18, 2017
In the Pig's Tail, Maya and her pals invite Mackenzie for dinner where they all get filmed by the video crew.
6	"The Way Home"	August 18, 2017
When everyone is stuck in Splendorious and seemingly doomed, Kippie, Rory and Lance introduce themselves to Davi, who is concerned about the problem.
7	"Mis-Adventures in Babysitting"	August 18, 2017
While Maya and Rachel are on their way to do school exams, Kippie, Rory and Lance are put in charge of taking care of Dina, but struggle to do so. Gratefully, two new Glitter Charms help to calm her down.
8	"Superstar Classmate"	August 18, 2017
Mackenzie moves to Maya and Rachel's school; all the boys get jealous, especially the bodyguards. When Mackenzie and Maya have a sleepover, Rachel gets worried and jealous. The next morning, one of the bodyguards turns into a Distain.
9	"Helpful to a Fault"	August 18, 2017
Maya volunteers to help the baseball team, while Rachel disagrees. This is the first time that the Glitter Force use Glitter Heart Arrow! Meanwhile, a mysterious girl watches over the girls.
10	"The Princess and the Rose"	August 18, 2017
The girls enter a Rose Lady competition as the prize is a Splendorius rose that might give a lead as to where the princess might be. On the way, they encounter a mysterious girl, who takes a peculiar interest in them and has some dark magic. Clara discovers that her rich girl rival Nellie Knotty is competing. Nellie tries many tricks on Clara and her friends to incite Clara, knowing that the latter has a short temper, but Clara stays calm throughout the challenges. Nellie gets upset that her own minion friends aren't helpful, and becomes influenced by Marmo, who takes her dark heart and becomes a Rose Distain. After Clara helps her friends defeat the monster, Dina touches the rose and it produces a mysterious crystal. Meanwhile the mysterious girl from before introduces herself to the Mercenare Trio as King Mercernare's daughter Regina.
11	"Lights... Camera... Distraction!"	August 18, 2017
Mackenzie is particularly busy as she is cast as the lead role in a film adaptation of Snow White, believing it to be another clue to Angelica's whereabouts. Despite the others showing up for support, Mackenzie has trouble focusing on her acting due to her desire to find Angelica, which leads her to be scorned by her co-star, Tiffany O'Hara, who had been seriously rehearsing her role. After hearing that Mackenzie had been spending her nights searching for Angelica, Maya and the others decide to take over her patrol so she can focus on her acting. However, on the last day of shooting, Regina appears and uses her power to force Tiffany to give birth to a Mirror Distain, which proves resistant to even the Glitter Heart Arrow. As Mackenzie realizes they need to combine their strengths, Dina gives the Glitter Force new Glitter Charms, which allow them to perform their new group attack, Togetherness Power Arrow, and defeat the Distain. After Regina introduces herself to the Glitter Force and takes her leave, Tiffany awards Mackenzie with her battered script, which brings forth the third Royal Crystal.
12	"Maya's New Best Frenemy"	August 18, 2017
Becoming interested in Maya, Regina appears before her, wanting to make her her friend. Despite Mackenzie and Rachel's objections, Maya agrees to be her friend, which upsets Mackenzie. This soon proves to be quite troublesome as Regina keeps asking Maya to play with her during school, causing havoc with her powers, and being rude to her other friends. As Rachel and Clara try to explain Mana's reasons for befriending Regina to Mackenzie, Regina becomes annoyed of Maya thinking of her other friends and decides to get rid of them by creating a Drinks Can Distain to attack them. Maya soon arrives on the scene, telling Regina that being true friends means being honest with each other instead of telling them what to do. After the Glitter Force defeat the Distain, Maya states that she would still earnestly want to become Regina's friend, but manages to make up with Mackenzie regardless, whilst Regina ponders the meaning of a "true friend".
13	"The Return of Regina"	August 18, 2017
Whilst visiting a forest sculpture gallery in hopes of finding another clue, the girls once again encounter Regina, who wants to try to be friends with Mana again. Maya agrees to let her join them on the condition that she be friends with the others as well. Makoto comes across a statue that reminds her strongly of Ange, whilst Johnny briefly pops by and leaves Dina with the others. When Mana presumes the red stone embedded in the statue could be a Royal Crystal, Regina destroys the statue in order to obtain the stone for her, which gets Mana and the others in trouble with the gallery manager. The sculptor, Hitomi, who shows no bad will, explains to the girls that he was inspired to design the statue like that after picking up the red stone. Noticing how Maya and the others took responsibility for her mistake, Regina states her earnest wish to be their friend, which transforms the stone into a red Royal Crystal. Just then, Regina suddenly changes personalities and desires the other Royal Crystals, targeting Hitomi to create a Sculptor Distain that turns Mackenzie, Rachel and Clara into statues. As Mana struggles to protect the Royal Crystals, Johnny suddenly appears in the guise of a knight to protect her, as well as help her turn the others back to normal, allowing them to defeat the Mercenares. As Regina escapes with the red Royal Crystal, Johnny reveals himself to be Jonathan Klondike, a knight of Splendorius and Angelica's fiancée.
14	"Royal Crystal Chaos"	August 18, 2017
Maya and her team are on a snowy summit mission to find Regina and the Royal Crystals. They realize that climbing the mountains is tougher than they thought, so according to Maya's suggestion, she transforms with the other girls to go up the mountain faster, but Johnny lags behind because of his heavy armor. Later after Regina and Glitter Heart fall into the inside holding hands due to a sudden crack enlarging, the rest of her team find them with Glitter Diamond's idea of a staircase made from ice shards. This is also the episode where Maya transforms into Glitter Heart twice.
15	"Back to Splendorius"	August 18, 2017
With help from Dina and the Royal Crystals, the Glitter Force find a way to travel to Splendorius. There, the Mercenare Trio bring Angelica before King Mercenare, but are unable to break her out of her protective barrier. When the Trio announce their plan to turn everyone in the human world into a Distain, Regina voices her objection, angering King Mercenare who strikes her down and seals off her powers. When the girls arrive in Splendorius, they fight off the Trio and an army of Distain whilst Mana heads towards Regina. There, they are both attacked by a Spider Distain, who leaves them above a lava pit dangling on a thread not strong enough to carry them both. Finally learning her true feelings towards Mana, Regina lets herself drop so that Mana can survive. However, Mana saves her just in time, refusing to give up and saying that in order to protect everyone, she can become stronger than even Regina's father. Regina's admiration of this speech allows her to break free from her seal, allowing her to fly Mana to safety whilst the PreCures defeat the Mercenare army, escaping back to the human world with Regina and Ange in tow.
16	"New Friends, Old Enemies"	November 10, 2017
The girls go to a beach while having a picnic. After having a fun time the three Mercenares show up, along with Regina's father. The other girls transform and fight the three Mercenares. Regina's father traps her in a tornado while talking to her. She explains that ever since she met Maya, she had been having this pain in her heart. He promises to take away the pain, and she accepts, but it turns out he turned her evil again using dark magic and made her stronger. This episode is also the debut of Glitter Ace.
17	"First Rule of Glitter Force!"	November 10, 2017
While the other three Glitter Force warriors are trying to defeat a Distain sent by new Mercenares Riva and Gura, Maya finds out about Glitter Ace's alter ego, Natalie.
18	"Mackenzie Loses Her Mojo"	November 10, 2017
Mackenzie plans on quitting singing, but as the Glitter Force warriors are struggling, she realizes that she didn't do it just for the princess, it was her destiny.
19	"Those Who Defend You"	November 10, 2017
Clara wants to level up after Marmo steals the duplicate Glitter Pad.
20	"Searching for a Dream"	November 10, 2017
Following a class about people's ambitions, Rachel worries about whether she really wanted to grow up to be a doctor, or if it was just out of admiration for her mother. That night, Ira is suddenly struck by lightning during one of his flights and falls into the sea. The next day, Rachel and Rory find him washed up on the beach, later discovering he has developed amnesia. Feeling she shouldn't leave him alone, Rachel takes him to her house to treat his injuries. As the other girls learn of this, Natalie sees him as a potential threat and prepares to fight him, but Rachel stands in her way, with the others standing by her decision. Just then, Gula attacks, during which Ira bangs his head and regains his memories. Despite this, Ira chooses to help the Glitter Force dodge Gula's attack, whilst Rachel, who comes to understand the power of believing in one's self and having no regrets, teams up with Natalie to fend off Gula. As Ira returns to the Mercanares's team, Rachel reaffirms her dream to become a doctor.
21	"Ace's Secret Weakness"	November 10, 2017
Maya and the others make a delivery to a friend of her mother's, who just so happens to be Natalie's grandmother who she is keeping Glitter Ace a secret from. Natalie invites Maya and the other's to her grandmother's open air tea ceremony, where they learn a bit more about Natalie's less serious side. Natalie explains she was a Glitter Force warrior who had previously been defeated by the Mercenares, which resulted in Dina, her partner, being reverted to an egg. Wanting to stop King Mercenare from conquering various worlds, Natalie became determined to make the other Glitter Force stronger so they can defeat him. Just then, Riva and Gura combine their strengths to create a giant Barbecue Distain. Natalie attempts to finish off the Distain quickly but ends up failing, exposing her weakness: she can only be transformed for five minutes. Thankfully, the other Glitter Force manage to stop the Distain before it can harm Natalie's grandmother.
22	"The Crystal Mirror"	November 10, 2017
The girl fly to a remote island, where Natalie intends to have them acquire the Glitter Crystal Pad, one of three mystical items, including Angelica's Spear of Light, that were used by legendary Glitter Force who saved the world from darkness 10,000 years ago. Arriving at the island, the girls meet the Lovely Pad's guardian, an elderly fairy named Mora, who tests the girls by transforming into a powerful dragon. The Glitter Force fight against her but are completely defeated. Natalie, downhearted by her loss, states that she became a Glitter Force warrior and sought the other's help so she could have the strength to obtain the Crystal Pad. Not wanting to give up so easily, Maya makes curry for everyone, encouraging them to try again. Fighting again, the Glitter Force manage to break through Mora's barrier by lending their power to Clara, though miss their chance to take advantage due to Natalie's time limit. However, Maya keeps on fighting till the very end, reminding Mora of the unrelenting spirit of her former partner, Glitter Empress. Although the Glitter Force don't manage to fully defeat Mora, she admires their strength and gives them the legendary mirror, the Crystal Pad.
23	"Darkness Is Coming"	November 10, 2017
Whilst taking a break from figuring out how to utilize the Lovely Pad, the girls are shocked to find their families, along with everyone in Sea Shell Bay, have fallen into sleeping comas. These are revealed to be the work of dark seeds spread by Riva and Gura, which will eventually darken their hearts and turn them into Distains, providing enough energy to awaken King Mercenare. The girls confront Riva and Gura, who combine into a powerful form, overwhelming them and crushing the Lovely Pad into pieces which causes Maya to Have an Emotional Breakdown. After letting out her frustrations, Maya regains her determination, encouraging the others to fight back. Their feelings transform the mirror's pieces into five new Lovely Pads, which allows the Glitter Force to lend their power to Mana and perform the Lovely Straight Flush, defeating Riva and Gura and restoring everyone in town to normal. As the girls enjoy a meal with their families, Bel eliminates Riva and Gura by absorbing their energy.
24	"The Spear of Light"	November 10, 2017
Johnny seemingly returns from hiding, telling the others that the key to awakening Ange may very well be her weapon, the Spear Of Light, which currently lies in Splendorius. He escorts the girls to Splendorius and leads them through secret pathways, though the fairies start to grow suspicious of him. Upon arriving at the Spear of Light, the girls reveal that they were aware Johnny was actually Bel in disguise, who was secretly trying to get them to remove the glaive from its resting spot, and just played along to get to the Trump Kingdom. Bel calls forth an Octopus Distain to fight the girls, who find they are also unable to remove the glaive. Just then, Regina appears before Mana, who stands firm in her resolve to talk things through with her. However, the darkness within Regina fights back with her Janergy, powering up the Distain in the process. Although the girls manage to defeat the Distain, Regina is suddenly able to take the spear for herself, forcing the Glitter Force to retreat back home.
25	"The Meaning of Family"	November 10, 2017
Natalie's story got told by her grandma; she was an infant the year before but got 10 years older. Natalie tries to run away because she thought she was a freak, not only after Maya tells her not to. The next day, Natalie draws a picture of her grandma, but after it got rubbed out, she cried for a little. She defeats the Distain that rubbed out her drawing, and then everything turns back to normal.
26	"The Golden Crown of Wisdom"	November 10, 2017
Johnny reveals he has found one of the three legendary treasures, the Eternal Golden Crown. When Natalie touches the crown, she is suddenly flooded with memories containing the truth of what happened in the Trump Kingdom. Natalie calls together Makoto and Joe in private, revealing that Ange was never trapped inside the crystal to begin with and telling them everything she learned. Believing she herself is fated to fight against Regina, Natalie takes Mackenzie and Johnny to Splendorius and confronts Regina, wagering her Golden Crown against Regina's Spear of Light. As the two girls push each other to their very limits, with Mackenzie and Johnny unable to do anything but spectate, Bel sends some Distains to attack them in their weakened states, but Maya, Rachel, and Clara, who had learned of Natalie's sudden disappearance from Eru, arrive to save Natalie and Regina. After the Distains are defeated, Natalie states that it is her destiny to fight Regina, revealing to Mana and the others that she and Regina are the light and darkness of Marie Angelica.
27	"The Story of Splendorius"	November 10, 2017
Using the Golden Crown, Natalie shows Maya, Regina, and the others the history of Splendorius. Marie Angelica, whose mother died shortly after her birth, was raised lovingly by her father, the King. One day, Angelica was struck by a deadly illness caused by a blob of darkness. In order to save her life, the King broke free the Golden Crown, which was used by the legendary Glitter Force to seal away a dark evil, in order to obtain the knowledge to cure her. Although Marie Angelica was cured, the darkness escaped and enveloped the King, transforming him into King Mercenare, forcing Angelica to seal him using the Dragon Glaive. After helping Mackenzie to escape to the human world, Marie Angelica was cornered by Bel, who attempted to turn her into a Mercenare. In order to prevent that, Marie Angelica split her psyche in half, separating her love for her kingdom and her love for her father, which would become Regina and Natalie, and she reverted to an egg which would eventually become Dina. After everything has been revealed to them, Regina decides to side with King Mercenare, who is awakened from his slumber. With King Mercenare and Regina arriving in the human world to try and destroy it, Maya and the others stand to defend it.
28	"The Beginning of the End"	November 10, 2017
Sea Shell Bay watches on as the Glitter Force fight against the Mercenares. Rachel, Clara, and Mackenzie fight against the Mercenare Trio whilst Maya goes with Natalie to try and talk to King Mercenare. Although Bel tries to bring the others down by stating the selfishness in people's hearts will cause Sea Shell Bay to end up just like Splendorius, the city's people instead show the strong power of their hearts as they help each other to evacuate. Regina soon fights against Maya, who stands firm in her love for her, reminding them they are always friends. When King Mercenare attacks them, Regina protects Mana, unleashing the Spear Of Light's true power and finally accepting her feelings of love for both Mana and her father. With Natalie's help, the three of them begin the fight to restore the love in King Mercenare's heart.
29	"The King Within"	November 10, 2017
Learning that Splendorius's King is trapped inside King Mercenare's heart, Maya decides they need to venture inside King Mercenare to rescue him. In the process, she casually blurts out her identity to the public, who give their support to the Cures as they break through the Mercenare's defenses and head inside King Mercenare's body. As Clara, Rachel, and Mackenzie stay behind to fend off the Distains, Maya, Natalie, Regina, and Dina arrive at the heart, where they are confronted by several Mercenare Cells. When they are suddenly put in a pinch, the King's love for his family emerges, giving Maya the power to vanquish the cells, allowing Natalie and the others to rescue the King and destroy King Mercenare. However, before the Glitter Force can celebrate their victory, Bel swallows the remaining fragment of the King to gain his power.
30	"The Last Battle"	November 10, 2017
Contrary to his plans, Bel is consumed by King Mercanare's power, which transforms into the ultimate being from 10,000 years ago, Proto Mercanare. As the Glitter Force, aided by Regina, struggle to fight against him, Proto Mercanare attempts to use his dark energy to steal Maya's Psyche. However, her Psyche manages to resist the darkness and return to Maya, who combines herself with the power of the other glitter force warriors and the three legendary weapons to transform into her 'Parthenon Mode', using its power to completely overwhelm Proto Mercanare. Assuring him that love will always be around to resist selfishness, Maya purifies Proto Mercanare, bringing the human world and Splendorius back to its former glory. Afterwards, the spirit of Angelica appears before the girls, stating that, even though she can no longer return to her previous form, she will continue to live on in Dina, Natalie, and Regina. Some time later, Regina joins Maya at school, whilst Splendorius, which is now connected to the human world, has been made into a republic, with Jonathan as its president. Meanwhile, Maya, Rachel, Clara, Mackenzie and Natalie continue to serve as Glitter Force, alongside Regina, protecting the world from danger. The series ends with the words, "Thank You" on the ending card.

== See also ==
- DokiDoki! Precure the Movie: Mana's Getting Married!!? The Dress of Hope that Connects to the Future - An animated film based on the series.
- Pretty Cure All Stars New Stage 2: Friends of the Heart - The fifth Pretty Cure All Stars crossover film which stars the DokiDoki Pretty Cures.
