= List of Smile Precure! episodes =

- Season 9
- First Japanese Blu-ray Disc volume of Smile PreCure! released by Marvelous AQL, featuring Cure Happy in her Princess form and Candy
- No. of episodes: 48 (40 dubbed)

Release
- Original network: ANN (ABC)
- Original release: February 5, 2012 – January 27, 2013

Series chronology
- ← Previous; Suite PreCure Next → DokiDoki! Precure

Smile PreCure! is the ninth installment of the Pretty Cure anime television series produced by Toei Animation. It follows Miyuki Hoshizora and her friends as she helps Candy gather all the Cure Décor and stop the Bad End Kingdom from giving the whole world the "Worst Ending". The original Japanese version aired in TV Asahi in Japan from February 5, 2012, to January 27, 2013, for 48 episodes, replacing Suite PreCure in its initial timeslot, and was succeeded by DokiDoki! PreCure. The opening theme is "Let's go! Smile PreCure!" (Let's go!スマイルプリキュア！, Retsu gō! Sumairu Purikyua) by Aya Ikeda. For the first 24 episodes, the ending theme is "Yay! Yay! Yay!" (イェイ！イェイ！イェイ！, Yei! Yei! Yei!) by Hitomi Yoshida, whilst the ending theme for episodes 25-48 is "Mankai * Smile!" (満開＊スマイル！, Mankai*Sumairu!; Full Bloom * Smile!) by Yoshida. All of the songs are composed by Hideaki Takatori. The series was well-received, placing regularly in Japan's weekly top ten anime shows broadcast.

The series was heavily edited and localized by Saban Brands under its SCG Characters unit, under the name Glitter Force and was released as a Netflix original series outside of Asia and in multiple languages. This version consists of 40 episodes, the first twenty of which were released on Netflix on December 18, 2015, and the second season on August 26, 2016. The dub, which was produced by Studiopolis, features changes to the character's names, terminology, catchphrases, and music. The theme song is "Glitter Force", performed by Blush, who also perform the insert songs before the closing credits that use footage of the girls in various computer-animated dance sequences.

The series was made available in home media. In Japan, a Blu-ray box set by Marvelous AQL and TC Entertainment was released on October 26, 2012, in the same fashion as Suite PreCure. Standard DVD releases were also issued.

== Episode list ==
Original no.	Netflix no.	Title	Original release date	Netflix release date	Rating (Note: TV Ratings are noted when the show reached the top ten for the week. This was for the TV Asahi broadcast.)
1	1	"An Exciting Beginning" / "She's Born! The Perfect Smile, Cure Happy!!"; Transliteration: "Tanjō! Egao Manten Kyua Happī!!" (Japanese: 誕生！笑顔まんてんキュアハッピー！！)	February 5, 2012	December 18, 2015	5.4
A new transfer student named Miyuki Hoshizora encounters a fairy from Märchenland named Candy while on her way for her first day at school, noticing Candy left a pink book behind. At school, Miyuki struggles while introducing herself to her class when her classmate Akane Hino helps her break the ice. While checking out the library after class, Miyuki stumbles across a portal that takes her to a magical library. And then, in another part of town, Candy is being chased by an anthropomorphic wolf named Wolfrun. As a commander from the Bad End Kingdom, Wolfrun uses his powers to make the nearby townsfolk fall in despair while revealing his intention to gather an ideal amount of negative energy from humans to resurrect his master, Pierrot. When Miyuki risks her life to protect Candy from Wolfrun, she receives a magic compact called a Smile Pact that transforms her into the magical warrior Cure Happy. Wolfrun responds by creating a monster called an Akanbe, with Miyuki eventually getting the hang of her powers to destroy it while gaining a Cure Décor from the monster's remains.
2	2	"Kelsey Gets a Makeover" / "On Fire! The Hot-Blooded Cure Sunny is Here!!"; Transliteration: "Moero! Nekketsu Kyua Sanī yade!!" (Japanese: 燃えろ！熱血キュアサニーやで！！)	February 12, 2012	December 18, 2015	5.6
After being told by Candy that they need to recruit four more Pretty Cure members, Miyuki approaches Akane and Yayoi Kise after gym class about joining the team. But despite the confusion that follows, Akane admits that she needs to try out for the volleyball team. But seeing Akane has her work cut for her on the first day of try-outs, Miyuki offers her support to Akane. But during the next day's try-outs, Wolfrun appears and gathers negative energy from everyone in attendance. Miyuki transforms into Cure Happy to prove Wolfrun wrong about his views of friendship, only to be overwhelmed by Wolfrun's volleyball Akanbe while learning she can only use her finishing move once per transformation. Akane awakens from Wolfrun's trance upon hearing Miyuki and attempts to save her from the Akanbe. This causes Akane to gain her own Smile Pact, transforming into Cure Sunny whose herculean strength allows her to destroy the Akanbe with her Sunny Fire while acquiring a Cure Décor. As Akane agrees to join the Pretty Cure as Miyuki's friend, Candy muses over friendship being their greatest power.
3	3	"We Want Peace! Glitter Peace!" / "Rock-Paper-Scissors♪ Cure Peace!!"; Transliteration: "Jankenpon♪ de Kyua Pīsu!!" (Japanese: じゃんけんポン♪でキュアピース！！)	February 19, 2012	December 18, 2015	5.9
Miyuki and Akane take notice of Yayoi's drawing talent and nominate her as their class representative for a poster design contest. But Yayoi fears losing to the other more skilled class representatives, agreeing to give it a chance after Miyuki's encouragement. But a few days after completing the poster, Yayoi is disheartened when her work is given an honorable mention and runs off after students from the winning class jeered at her. Yayoi ends up being confronted by the Bad End commander Akaoni who siphons her negative energy along with those around her. Miyuki and Akane appear when Akaoni crumbles Yayoi's poster and uses it to create a Akanbe that overpowers them while their words reach Yayoi. When Yayoi musters up her courage to stand up to the Akanbe's way when it is about to kill Miyuki and Akane, she acquires her Smile Pact and transforms into Cure Peace. After a brief relapse in cowardice, Cure Peace purifies the Akanbe back into her poster with her Peace Thunder while gaining a Cure Décor. Later accepting her loss, Yayoi cries over having friends like Miyuki and Akane.
4	4	"Here Comes Glitter Spring!" / "A Straight Up Bout! Cure March of the Wind!!"; Transliteration: "Chokkyū Shōbu! Kaze no Kyua Māchi!!" (Japanese: 直球勝負！風のキュアマーチ！！)	February 26, 2012	December 18, 2015	6.1
Miyuki and her friends are having lunch when they are being evicted from their spot by two older girls before their classmate Nao Midorikawa and Student Council President Irie defuse the situation. After watching Nao at soccer practice, Miyuki attempts to recruit her but ends up missing her while lamenting that she would not see her at school. After an attempt to find where Nao lives, Miyuki finds her by accident and meets her younger siblings. Later joined by Akane and Yayoi, Miyuki realizes that the Pretty Cure are like a family and attempts to make the offer when Akaoni appears and extracts negative energy from Nao and her siblings. Akaoni, denouncing family values, then creates a soccer goal net Akanbe that takes Miyuki hostage while targeting Nao's family. Nao, snapping out of the trace, is determined to save her family and gains the ability to become Cure March as she learns to control her superspeed while defeating the Akanbe. The team receive a Cure Décor, and Nao admits she wanted to become friends with them while eagerly joining the Pretty Cure.
5	5	"Glitter Breeze vs. The Witch" / "A Beautiful Heart! Cure Beauty!!"; Transliteration: "Utsukushiki Kokoro! Kyua Byūti!!" (Japanese: 美しき心！キュアビューティ！！)	March 4, 2012	December 18, 2015	6.1
Miyuki and her friends attempt to recruit their classmate, Student Vice President Reika Aoki as the final Pretty Cure member. But even after believing their story, Reika rejects the offer due to her busy schedule and a student council commitment of telling a fairy tale story to elementary school students. When the Student President is revealed to be sick, Miyuki and the others offer their help in making puppets for the Student Council's telling of "Snow White". But during the performance, the Bad End Kingdom's witch commander Majorina appears and proceeds to extract negative energy while her Mirror Akanbe render the Pretty Cure powerless by having them waste their attacks on its clones. When Reika snaps out of the trace upon seeing Majorina destroying one of the puppets, she refuses to let her friends' work be wasted as she gains the power to become Cure Beauty. Cure Beauty deduces the real Akanbe and destroys it while driving Majorina off, with the performance resuming.
6	6	"The Library of Legends" / "The Team is Complete! Smile Pretty Cure!!"; Transliteration: "Chīmu Kessei! Sumairu Purikyua!!" (Japanese: チーム結成！スマイルプリキュア！！)	March 11, 2012	December 18, 2015	5.4
While finally assembled, the Pretty Cure are dismayed over Candy having forgot the full story of their mission as they are joined by another fairy: Candy's big brother Pop. Pop escorts the girls to the Library of Legends where Miyuki left the book Candy came to Earth in, revealing it as their unfinished story. Pop explains when Märchenland was attacked by Pierrot and his minions, their ruler Royal Queen having used the last of her power to seal Pierrot after he stole the Cure Décors from her. Pop explains that Queen sent Candy to Earth to recruit the Pretty Cure so that they can reclaim the stolen Cure Décor which are the core of the Akanbes' clown noses, giving the girls the Décor Décor chest which would be used to revive Queen once all Cure Décors are inserted. At the Bad End Kingdom, while being observed by their benefactor Joker who reminds of their mission to revive Pierrot, Majorina beats her comrades in a card game over the right to collect negative energy. The girls are alerted to Majorina's attack while Miyuki convinced them they should have a group catchphrase, Pop showing them how the library's portal system works despite Miyuki ending up in the South Pole. Pop retrieves Miyuki and admits his concern for Candy as they rejoin the others after Majorina created a drink can Akanbe, who sneak attacks the Pretty Cure after they found their catchphrase. Pop intervenes by using his transformation powers to turn into a recycling bin to help weaken the Akanbe enough to be destroyed with the Pretty Cure placing their latest Cure Décor into Décor Décor. After Pop returns to Märchenland, the girls attempt to cheer Candy up when she suddenly gets hungry.
7	7	"The Perfect Hideout" / "Where Could It Be? Our Secret Base!?"; Transliteration: "Dokonano? Watashitachi no Himitsu Kichi!?" (Japanese: どこなの？わたし達のひみつ基地！？)	March 18, 2012	December 18, 2015	5.8
Following an incident when they attempt to contact Pop during their lunch break in school, the girls agree they need a secret base, After Akane resends her initial idea of using the Library of Legends as their base, the girls search around town with little luck as each place has major drawbacks. Then Miyuki, using "Anne of Green Gables" as a reference, remembers her secret place near her old home with the girls deciding to give it a shot. But it became a secret playground for two little girls, Miyuki deciding to let them be when Wolfrun intrudes and takes their negative energy while creating a tree Akanbe. After the Pretty Cure destroy the monster and get the Cure Décor, the girls let the Library of Legends decide on the place which turns out to be itself as they use the Star Charm to create an indoor library as their proper base.
8	8	"Glitter Switchers!" / "Miyuki and Candy Switch Places~!?"; Transliteration: "Miyuki to Kyandi ga Irekawa~ru!?" (Japanese: みゆきとキャンディがイレカワ～ル！？)	March 25, 2012	December 18, 2015	5.4
On their way to school, Miyuki and Candy find a pair of strange rings that cause them to switch bodies. Unable to figure out how to get the rings off, Candy has to fill in for Miyuki during classes, causing chaos with her childlike behavior. After Miyuki scolds her for embarrassing her, Candy runs off and is targeted by Majorina who reveals the rings as her creations which Akaoni accidentally threw away. When the Pretty Cure arrive, Majorina reveals she has the antidote while creating a Akanbe from a Spring rider. Despite Candy's inability to use Miyuki's Smile Pact, she gives it to Miyuki so she can transform into Cure Candy while in the fairy's body to defeat the Akanbe while her friends get the antidote.
9	9	"April Fools!" / "No Way~! Yayoi's Being Transferred!?"; Transliteration: "Uso~! Yayoi-chan ga Tenkō!?" (Japanese: うそ～！やよいちゃんが転校！？)	April 1, 2012	December 18, 2015	5.4
On April Fools' Day, Yayoi makes up a lie that she is being transferred to another school the next day. But Miyuki takes it seriously and spreads the rumor to the others, with Yayoi finding herself unable to tell them the truth out of fear of losing her friends as it quickly escalates to the whole class throwing a farewell party for Yayoi. Just then, after being subjected to April Fools jokes himself, Akaoni appears and gives false orders to his Roller Akanbe to throw the girls off while exposing Yayoi's lie. After some encouragement from Miyuki, Yayoi comes clean about her lie to the others' relief before defeating the Akanbe. After Yayoi apologizes to the rest of the class, the other girls play their own little prank on her.
10	–	"Hot-Blooded! Akane's Okonomiyaki Life!!"; Transliteration: "Nekketsu! Akane no Okonomiyaki Jinsei!!" (Japanese: 熱血！あかねのお好み焼き人生！！)	April 8, 2012	N/A	6.0
Akane offers to run her family's okonomiyaki restaurant when her father strained his back for a neighborhood association dinner that the mayor is attending. But Akane is concerned her okonomiyaki is not as good as her father's, enlisting her friends to help her find her father's "secret ingredient" to no avail when her mother Misako reminded Akane of the first time she made okonomiyaki. When the girls set up an okonomiyaki food stand at a food fair, which is crashed by a hungry Wolfrun who has been starving for three days after being kicked out of every restaurant in town for his strange appearance. Wolfrun proceeds to take the participants' negative energies and food, creating an Akanbee to hold the Pretty Cure off as he ate Akane's okonomiyaki, belittling her. But Miyuki's retort makes Akane realize that the feeling she puts in her okonomiyaki is the secret ingredient, defeating the Akanbee and later impressing the mayor with her dish.
11	10	"Shrink-a-Rooed!" / "The Pretty Cure Have Shrunk~!?"; Transliteration: "Purikyua ga Chīsaku Na~ru!?" (Japanese: プリキュアがチイサクナ～ル！？)	April 15, 2012	December 18, 2015	7.2
Upon finding a mysterious mallet pertaining to the story of a pin-sized warrior, later revealed to be one of Majorina's misplaced inventions, Candy inadvertently shrinks the girls. Now in miniature size, the girls must navigate giant-sized obstacles to try and recover the mallet from Candy, which proves particularly difficult as Nao is revealed to have a fear of bugs. But she becomes less shy around bugs after a group of woodlice help save her life and look after her. As Nao starts to see the bug in a different light, Majorina finds them while reclaiming her hammer from Candy, exploiting their size to take negative energy from the bugs while creating a Dandelion Akanbe. Nao overcomes her bug phobia to defeat the Akanbe with the other girls, Majorina inadvertently restoring them in her attempt of squashing them with the hammer. But after restored to her original size, Nao's relapses into her bug phobia when a ladybug lands on her nose.
12	11	"Feeling Blue" / "The Awakened Power! Rainbow Healing!!"; Transliteration: "Mezameru Chikara! Reinbō Hīringu!!" (Japanese: 目覚める力！レインボーヒーリング！！)	April 22, 2012	December 18, 2015	6.4
As the girls prepare to go on a school trip to Kyoto and Osaka (an Asian-Pacific expo in the Netflix dub), Candy becomes upset that she is not invited. Meanwhile, the Three Commanders receive Blue Noses from Joker which do not possess a Cure Décor and thus makes the Akanbes created from them immune to purification attacks. As the commanders debate over which of them gets first crack, Joker is more interested in his own agenda of finding the mysterious Miracle Jewel. When Candy runs away after her attempts of helping the girls out only made their preparations more difficult, she runs into Wolfrun who gloats his scheme of having the Pretty Cure waste their attacks and cages the fairy when she attempts to warn them. By the time Candy is freed, Wolfrun's scheme with a Blue-Nosed Gachapon machine Akanbe succeeds. But when the Pretty Cure stand up to Wolfrun when he belittles Candy, her wish to help the girls manifests as Miracle Jewel Décors which allow the Pretty Cure to assume Tiara Mode and destroy the Akanbe. Later, Candy is accepted as an official teammate and allowed to come along on the school excursion.
13	12	"Emily's Unlucky Day" / "School Trip! Miyuki, Happy in the Depths of Kyoto!?"; Transliteration: "Shūgaku Ryokō! Miyuki, Kyōto de Donzoko Happī!?" (Japanese: 修学旅行！みゆき、京都でドン底ハッピー！？)	April 29, 2012	December 18, 2015	5.4
The girls arrive in Kyoto, but Miyuki's excitement soon dwindles when draws a fortune paper for "bad luck" at a shrine visit and soon has a series of unlucky mishaps while fearing it rubbing off on her friends. Akaoni appears to terrorize Kyoto like in his book, extracting negative energy while creating a blue-nosed Akanbe from Miyuki's fortune paper. During the fight, Miyuki loses her Smile Pact with her defeated while searching for it. Running back to her friends while blaming herself for their misfortune, Miyuki is assured by them that they are lucky to have her away as she regains her Smile Pact and they finish the Akanbe off in Tiara Mode. Following the fight, Miyuki thanks her friends before finally managed to take a good commemorative photo with Geishas.
14	13	"The Lost Girls" / "School Trip! Getting Lost in Osaka!?"; Transliteration: "Shūgaku Ryokō! Ōsaka de Maigo ni Natchatta!?" (Japanese: 修学旅行！大阪で迷子になっちゃった！？)	May 6, 2012	December 18, 2015	4.1
As the class arrives in Osaka for the second part of their trip, Miyuki, Yayoi, and Candy end up getting separated from Akane, Nao, and Reika while at Osaka Castle. As Miyuki and Yayoi decide to follow the itinerary they got and experience the delights of Osaka, encountering some polite locals (parent chaperones in the English version) along the way, the others end up missing most of the sights while searching for them. Majorina also arrived in Osaka to acquire some Nattō Gyoza(garlic mustard in English version)-flavored candies from a shop, furious that they ran out of stock as she extracts negative energy while creating a blue-nosed Akanbe from Osaka Tower with Miyuki and Yayoi trapped inside. Using one of the Cure Décors, Akane, Nao, and Reika are given butterfly wings as they the Nattō Gyoza candy to force the Akanbe to release their friends so they can defeat it. Soon after, the girls use what little time they had left in Osaka to try out food from a rice ball shop.
15	14	"Mother's Day Crunch" / "Slapstick! Miyuki's Big Mother's Day Plan!!"; Transliteration: "Dotabata! Miyuki no Haha no Hi Daisakusen!!" (Japanese: ドタバタ！みゆきの母の日大作戦！！)	May 13, 2012	December 18, 2015	5.7
Miyuki realizes she has forgotten to prepare a Mother's Day present and her attempt to help her mother with house chores causes a bigger mess. Miyuki sees the items her friends made for their mothers and decides to make a bead necklace, though she not happy with it. Following his inability to rid himself of the taste from Majorina's Nattō Gyoza candy, Wolfrun extracts negative energy while taking out his frustration on flower shop during its Mother's Day sale and then creates a Carnation Akanbe when the Pretty Cure arrive. Miyuki gets upset when her necklace gets chipped in the fight with Wolfrun belittling her, but her friends remind her that it is the thought that counts as they take it back from Wolfrun while defeating his Akanbe. Afterwards, Miyuki gives the necklace to her mother who truly appreciates it.
16	15	"Chloe Quits" / "Reika's Worries! Why Do I Study!?"; Transliteration: "Reika no Nayami! Dōshite Benkyō suru no!?" (Japanese: れいかの悩み！どうして勉強するの！？)	May 20, 2012	December 18, 2015	4.7
Following the end of term grades, Reika is asked by her friends on why she works so hard and studies, whether it is for herself or for her parents. Reika realizes she does not know, deciding to drop all her activities to give this though, including being in the Pretty Cure. She spends some time with the other girls, observing what they enjoy doing with themselves whilst thinking about what she wants to do herself. After refusing to go through a textbook Joker gave him to study up on their enemies, Akaoni creates a Textbook Akanbe which punishes the girls for getting questions wrong. Reika rejoins the girls and defeats the Akanbee, having found her resolve in why she words diligently.
17	–	"Hot-Blooded! Akane's Comedy Life!!"; Transliteration: "Nekketsu! Akane no Owarai Jinsei!!" (Japanese: 熱血！あかねのお笑い人生！！)	May 27, 2012	N/A	5.2
Miyuki and Akane prepare a manzai act for a comedy contest judged by comedy duo Fujiwara. On the day of the contest, the girls go backstage and meet Toshifumi Fujimoto and Takayuki Haranishi as the comedy duo suggests the five of them enter together. Wolfrun and Akaoni also participate, but their nihilist brand of humor fails to win the audience compared to the girls who blunder over their routine. Majorina makes her move at that moment to place comedy-draining neck rings on the Fujiwara duo before taking the audience's negative while creating two Akanbe who overpower the Pretty Cure. But the tables are turned when the Fujiwara duo break free of Majorina's spell with their comedy to distract the Akanbe long enough to be destroyed. While the Fujiwara duo promise to not divulge the Pretty Cures' civilian identities, they still parody them in their comedy routine.
18	16	"The Great Relay Race" / "Nao's Feelings! The Baton That Connects Everyone's Bonds!!"; Transliteration: "Nao no Omoi! Baton ga Tsunagu Minna no Kizuna!!" (Japanese: なおの想い！バトンがつなぐみんなの絆！！)	June 3, 2012	December 18, 2015	5.1
As their class shows little enthusiasm for the sports festival, Nao nominates herself and the other girls to run for the relay team. Yayoi does not have much confidence in her running ability, but cheers up when Nao states she wants to run together with everyone. While the girls prepare for the contests, Yayoi overhears some other students badmouthing her, she loses her confidence again. As the day of the sports festival comes and Yayoi still has doubts, Akaoni appears and summons a blue-nosed Basket Akanbe, soon culminating in a tug of war with the girls. As Nao refuses to accept Akaoni denouncing teamwork, Yayoi regains her confidence and helps the others defeat the Akanbe. With the relay race finally underway, Yayoi gets support from the rest of the class and passes the baton. Although Nao trips and ends up coming last, her friends console her while their classmates commend them for the effort and making the entire day fun.
19	–	"Thank You, Papa! Yayoi's Treasure"; Transliteration: "Papa, Arigatō! Yayoi no Takaramono" (Japanese: パパ、ありがとう！やよいのたからもの)	June 10, 2012	N/A	5.0
As the class is asked to research the meaning behind their names, Yayoi laments that she does not remember much about her late father who named her. As she ponders about why she was given her name, she has flashes of a certain place but cannot seem to remember where. As she remains uneasy, she sees her mother, Chiharu, who shows her some origami Yayoi had made for Father's Day, which he kept as important treasure. A livid Wolfrun suddenly appears after being upset from the hurtful meaning of his own name, creating a fox-like Akanbee form of her origami. Although she struggles in her fight, Yayoi eventually sees the origin of her name from her memories of her father.
20	17	"See-U-No-More" / "Invisible People? Miyuki and Akane Become Invisible~!?"; Transliteration: "Tōmei Ningen? Miyuki to Akane ga Mienakuna~ru!?" (Japanese: 透明人間？みゆきとあかねがミエナクナ～ル！？)	June 24, 2012	December 18, 2015	4.3
Miyuki and Akane are turned invisible when Candy finds a strange camera that is revealed to be another of Majorina's inventions, telling their friends after they initially assumed they were being attacked by ghost. Miyuki and Akane try to get through school without incident in bōgu (kendo uniforms) while Candy searches for where she left the camera. But Majorina finds it and uses on herself while extracting negative energy, restoring Miyuki and Akane to have the advantage with an invisible blue-nosed Jack-in-the-Box Akanbe while disabling Candy's senses with her Nattō Gyoza candy. Eventually, Cure Beauty manages to make the Akanbe visible for her team to defeat it with Majorina's camera destroyed in the process. But Miyuki and Akane end up becoming invisible again when Candy stumbled on another of Majorina's cameras.
21	18	"Wish Upon a Star" / "Wish to the Stars! Everyone Together For~ever!!"; Transliteration: "Hoshi ni Negai o! Minna Zūtto Issho!!" (Japanese: 星にねがいを！みんなず～っと一緒！！)	July 1, 2012	December 18, 2015	6.1
Pop visits the girls on the day of Tanabata after being informed by Candy that they need only one more Cure Décor to complete their mission, seeing the holiday to be similar to a Märchenland custom Pegasus Day. The girls write out wishes before going to the park to watch a meteor shower. Akaoni appears extracts negative energy while create a Akanbe out of a bamboo tree and the last of the red noses. The girls defeat the Akanve to acquire the last charm they need, but Joker suddenly appears as he grabs both the Décor Décor and Candy, whom he assumes to know the location of the Miracle Jewel.
22	19	"The Ultimate Choice" / "What's The Most Important Thing?"; Transliteration: "Ichiban Taisetsu na Monotte, Nāni?" (Japanese: いちばん大切なものって、なぁに？)	July 8, 2012	December 18, 2015	4.9
Returning to their base while realizing they still have the Star Charm which Miyuki used to decorate their tree, the girls find Candy's wishes for them as they decide to travel with Pop to the Shadow Realm by reaching Märchenland. Joker deems Candy ignorant of the Miracle Jewel following his interrogation, Joker noticing the missing Cure Décor and confronts the Pretty Cure once they arrive in the mostly deserted Märchenland. Joker quickly overpowers the group single-handedly, taking the Star Charm while psychologically breaking the girls to acquire the last amount of negative energy to complete Pierrot's revival. As the girls lament of how afraid they are and what is waiting for them, Miyuki suggests everyone think on their own about what is most important to them before meeting up with Pop at the path to the Bad End Kingdom. Following much though while reading Candy's wishes, the girls gained renewed resolve as they prepare to venture to the Bad End Kingdom to rescue Candy as Joker completes Pierrot's resurrection.
23	20	"Into the Shadow Realm!" / "Pierrot's Revival! The Pretty Cure are in Danger!!"; Transliteration: "Piēro Fukkatsu! Purikyua Zettaizetsumei!!" (Japanese: ピエーロ復活！プリキュア絶体絶命！！)	July 15, 2012	December 18, 2015	4.9
The girls arrive at the Bad End Kingdom where they are confronted by the Three Commanders with Akane, Yayoi, and Nao fighting Wolfrun, Akaoni, and Majorina while Reika holds off Joker for Miyuki to reach Candy before attacked by a yellow-nosed Rock Akanbe holding the Décor Décor. Despite the hopeless situation, the girls' faith in each other allow them to defeat their respective opponents while Candy and the Décor Décor are retrieved. However, Pierrot awakens and readies his Bad End Cannon to wipe out the Pretty Cure as Miyuki has Pop take Candy and the Décor Décor to safety. But the Décor Décor activates, allowing Queen to give the girls their new Princess Forms to seemingly obliterate Pierrot.
24	21	"The Story Continues" / "The Pretty Cure Have Become Fairies, miyu~!?"" Transliteration: "Purikyua ga Yōsei ni Natchatta, miyu~!?" (Japanese: プリキュアが妖精になっちゃった、みゆ～！？)	July 22, 2012	August 26, 2016	4.2
Reaching Märchenland's palace to find Queen still as statue, Pop decides to turn the Pretty Cure into fairies to blend in and not cause a panic while he investigates why Queen hasn't fully revived. The girls meet some of the various fairy-tale based inhabitants, winning their friendship even after returning to the original states while learning the wish-granting Miracle Jewel. Meanwhile, Joker retrieves an egg-like object which is what remained of Pierrot after the Pretty Cure defeated him while giving Wolfrun a new type of Akanbe Nose, which he uses to create a more powerful Gingerbread House Super Akanbe. As the girls stand to protect the hopes of Märchenlan's citizens, they are once again able to summon the Princess Candles and defeat the Super Akanbe, earning two new Cure Décors. Afterwards, Queen telepathically contacts the group and reveals that she used the power from the previous Décors to grant the Pretty Cure their Princess Forms and must fill up the Décor Décor once again with more Cure Décors to complete their mission to revive her.
25	22	"Battle on the Beach" / "The Summer! The Sea! Akane and Nao's Stubborn Showdown!!""; Transliteration: "Natsu da! Umi da! Akane to Nao no Ijippari Taiketsu!!" (Japanese: 夏だ！海だ！あかねとなおの意地っ張り対決！！)	August 5, 2012	August 26, 2016	4.8
As Summer rolls in, Miyuki heads down to the beach to help out Akane's okonomiyaki stand, who is competing against Nao's shaved ice stand being assisted by Reika. Even after taking a break, Akane and Nao's fierce rivalry leads them to continue competing with each other as Akaoni appears for a day at the beach and instead extracts negative energy from the beach-goers. Akaoni then summons a Shaved Ice Super Akanbe with Akane and Nao letting stubbornness cause their friends to get captured. The two girls' desiring to save their friends causes them to combine their powers and free the others, allowing them to defeat the Super Akanbe. Inspired by their teamwork, Akane and Nao start selling their okonomiyaki and shaved ice together.
26	-	"Summer Festival! A Massive Flower Blooms in the Night Sky!"; Transliteration: "Natsu Matsuri! Yozora ni Saku Ōkina Hana!" (Japanese: 夏祭り！夜空に咲く大きな大きな花！)	August 12, 2012	N/A	4.1
The girls take Candy with them to experience a summer festival. As the girls try out the various stands, Candy accidentally is mistaken as doll while checking out a stall on her own with the girls forced to win her back. By that time, having had a horrible experience of her own at the stalls, Majorina proceeds to gather negative and summons a Matsuri Super Akanbe which the Pretty Cure defeat. After the battle, the girls find a viewing spot for the fireworks.
27	-	"A Summer Mystery!? Grandma's Treasure"; Transliteration: "Natsu no Fushigi!? Obāchan no Takaramono" (Japanese: 夏のふしぎ！？おばあちゃんのたからもの)	August 19, 2012	N/A	4.5
Miyuki and her friends travel to the country to visit her grandmother Tae Hoshizora, who influenced her love of stories with tales of friendly creatures. Following dinner, with Tae knowing about Candy, Miyuki inquires why her grandmother doesn't just come to live in the city. Tae replies that she likes where she is as her 'secret treasure' is here. The next day, the girls encounter Wolfrun as he was escaping the summer heat in the mountains before losing his temper when Tae mistook him for a fox. But when Wolfrun sets up a Dark Zone, he and the girls are shocked to find Tae unaffected as she ignores the furious commander while returning to her house. Wolfrun responds by summoning an Incense Super Akanbe destroy Tae's house. With the apparent aid of the creatures from Tae's stories, the Pretty Cure defeat the Super Akanbe with Miyuki learning her grandmother's treasure.
28	23	"The Ghost Hunters" / "Lies? Truths? We Aren't Afraid of Ghosts!""; Transliteration: "Uso? Honto? Obake nanka Kowakunai!" (Japanese: ウソ？ホント？おばけなんかこわくない！)	August 26, 2012	August 26, 2016	N/A
With summer break over, Akane takes advantage of learning of Miyuki and Nao's fear of ghosts to hold a courage test at the school to disprove of supposed haunted spots Reika knew of. Majorina learns of this and turns the entire school into a Super Akanbee, terrorizing the girls until they wised up to Majorina's scheme and only escaped when Miyuki and Nao unintentionally tickled the Super Akanbe's innards while running from the monster's extensions and take advantage of its heaviness to purify it. Afterwards, Miyuki, Akane, Yayoi, and Nao remember something much scarier than any ghost; their unfinished summer homework.
29	24	"A Dicey Game" / "The Pretty Cure are Sucked Into a Game~!?""; Transliteration: "Purikyua ga Gēmu ni Suikomare~ru!?" (Japanese: プリキュアがゲームニスイコマレ～ル！？)	September 2, 2012	August 26, 2016	7.0
Whilst Reika sees her friends fretting over their summer homework, they stumble upon another of Majorina's inventions and get sucked into a game world. Discovering Majorina, Wolfrun and Akaoni had also been sucked into the same world, the girls are challenged to a series of games that they must complete in order to escape and finish their homework. Despite the games being rigged, Miyuki outdoes Majorina in a game of Whac-A-Mole while Akane beats Wolfrun in a go-kart race and Yayoi exceeds Akaoni at bowling. Nao then wins at baseball whilst Reika succeeds in swimming before the girls eventually reach the final stage: riding a Ferris Wheel Super Akanbe while keeping a positive attitude when faced with depressing visions of their lack of studies. This is revealed to have been Majorina's scheme to make the Pretty Cure wrecked with guilt over being procrastinators, not counting on Reika cheering her friends up by offering to help them study. The girls then defeat the Akanbe and return to the real world, though Reika and Candy can only watch as the others still face the consequences of not finishing their homework on time.
30	25	"Around the World in Eighty Books" / "An Around-the-World Trip Through the Book Door!!""; Transliteration: "Hon no Tobira de Sekai Isshū Dairyokō!!" (Japanese: 本の扉で世界一周大旅行！！)	September 9, 2012	August 26, 2016	6.8
Feeling they haven't done enough during their summer vacation, Miyuki suggests taking advantage of the Library of Legends to travel around the world. The girls take a trip through various locations such as Versailles, Taiwan, Mongolia, the Great Wall of China and New York City. As the girls wrap up their trip in the Amazon, they are confronted by Akaoni who extracts negative energy from the wildlife while having a Pirhana Super Akanbe swallow Candy and the Décor Décor. With the girls struggling underwater, Candy uses the Dolphin Décor to turn them into mermaids to rescue her before they defeat the Akanbe for the last Cure Décors they need. Upon completing the Décor Décor again, a mysterious new clock appears.
31	26	"The Royal Clock" / "The Royal Clock and Candy's Secret!!""; Transliteration: "Roiyaru Kurokku to Kyandi no Himitsu!!" (Japanese: ロイヤルクロックとキャンディの秘密！！)	September 16, 2012	August 26, 2016	5.1
Miyuki breaks a cookie for her and friends to share as they ponder about the strange clock before Pop arrives, revealing it to be the Royale Clock as Queen appears from it and explains how it will grant the Pretty Cure and Candy a new power. Meanwhile, telling the Three Commanders that they are on borrowed time for their repeated failures, Joker gives Wolfrun a new black Akanbe nose which he uses to create a Digger Hyper Akanbe that he merges into. The Wolfrun Hyper Akanbe overpowers the Pretty Cure while Joker traps Candy in the blissful dreamlike world within his Ball of Neglect, a prototype of the new world Pierrot will create from Earth. While their Princess Mode is ineffective against the Wolfrun Hyper Akanbe, they managed to reach Candy as she breaks free with her emotions stirring a power which activates the Royale Clock. Candy's aura heals the Pretty Cure while reverts Hyper Akanbe to a normal Akanbe that Miyuki defeats. But the victory is short-lived as Joker traps Akane, Yayoi, Nao, and Reika in the Ball of Neglect.
32	27	"A Perfect Nightmare" / "All Hearts As One! The Pretty Cure's New Power!!""; Transliteration: "Kokoro o Hitotsu ni! Purikyua no Aratanaru Chikara!!" (Japanese: 心を一つに！プリキュアの新たなる力！！)	September 23, 2012	August 26, 2016	5.2
Wanting to save her friends, Miyuki decides to venture into the Ball of Neglect and starts succumbing to its influence like her friends. Luckily, Candy returns to the dream world and snaps Miyuki out of it as she transforms to try and destroying the Ball of Neglect from the inside. But Joker intercepts the attack while conjuring a yellow-nosed Rollercoaster Akanbe that overpowers her, explaining that her friends will never wake up as Pierrot only wants to create a world without suffering. But Miyuki's desperate fight and reasoning that suffering is essential for people to enjoy life stirs her friends back to their senses. After the girls break free from the Ball of Neglect and Joker powers up his Akanbe into a Hyper Akanbe, they unlock the Royale Clock and defeat the monster with Joker seeing he must find the Miracle Jewel more than ever. Soon after, the Pretty Cure learn they need to get one more set of Cure Décor to revive the Queen.
33	-	"History Drama in a Movie Studio!?'s Tactics!"; Transliteration: "Eigamura de Jidaigeki de Gozaru!? no Maki!" (Japanese: 映画村で時代劇でござる！？の巻！)	September 30, 2012	N/A	5.4
As the girls visit the site of a period drama movie shooting, attracting the attention of director who casts them in the movie. An excited Pop assumes human form to convince the director to cast him as well, ending up stealing the spotlight with the director enthusiastic despite the script deviations. The gang were about to film the climax when Akaoni crashes the set, furious to find the monsters he saw in the promo were fake as extracts negative energy while summoning a video camera Hyper Akanbe that fives the Pretty Cure trouble with its playback feature before Candy sabotages it so the girls can defeat it. Pop borrows the video footage to edit out any compromising images of the Pretty Cure, making him the main focus while omitting the girls from the finished product.
34	-	"United as One! Miracle Fashion Show at the Culture Festival!!"; Transliteration: "Itchi Danketsu! Bunkasai de Mirakuru Fasshon Shō!!" (Japanese: 一致団結！文化祭でミラクルファッションショー！！)	October 7, 2012	N/A	3.6
As the girls' class decides to do a fashion show for the culture festival, their classmate Toyoshima refuses to participate as he feels it is too girly and wants to be in a band as Miyuki and the other attempt to convince Toyoshima to reconsider to no avail. As Miyuki follows after Toyoshima and hears his thoughts on how he wants to have fun with everyone, Majorina appears and uses his guitar to create a Hyper Akanbe whose music overwhelms the Cures. Thankfully, Candy uses one of the Decors to slip the Akanbe up, giving the Cures a chance to defeat it. Afterwards, Miyuki manages to get Toyoshima to participate by having his band perform musical accompaniment for a fairy-tale themed fashion show.
35	28	"Super-Lucky-Bott" / "Yayoi, Protect the Earth! A Pretty Cure Became a Robot!?""; Transliteration: "Yayoi, Chikyū o Mamore! Purikyua ga Robo ni Na~ru!?" (Japanese: やよい、地球を守れ！プリキュアがロボニナ～ル！？)	October 14, 2012	August 26, 2016	5.6
While accompanying an excited Yayoi to release of a new Super Robot toyline at the toy store, the girls are suddenly interrupted by the arrival of the Three Commanders. Majorina unveils a laser gun that can be used once to turn whoever it hits into a giant robot, transforming Miyuki by mistake instead of either Wolfrun or Akaoni. But the two commanders came prepared and create robot Hyper Akanbe from a two-piece evil robot toy, Miyuki finds herself unable to move on her own so Yayoi and the others go inside in order to pilot her. While the other girls couldn't work out the controls, Reika manages to pilot Miyuki well thanks to the Super Robot manual Yayoi gave her. Wolfrun and Akaoni combine their Akanbe into a more powerful form, but the girls manage to get on even ground thanks to a Cure Décor. But Majorina stops the fight by destroying her now useless invention to restore Miyuki, only for the Pretty Cure to drive the commanders back after defeating the Hyper Akanbe with their Royal Rainbow Burst.
36	-	"Hot-Blooded!? Akane's First Love Life!!"; Transliteration: "Nekketsu!? Akane no Hatsukoi Jinsei!!" (Japanese: 熱血！？あかねの初恋人生！！)	October 21, 2012	N/A	5.9
An English exchange student named Brian Taylor enrolls in the class and Akane seems to be awkward around him for some reason. After she spends the afternoon guiding around the school, the others suspect that she might have like him and made failed attempts to have her confess her. But Akane manages to spend some time with Brian and teaching him new words, only to devastated upon learning he is returning to England soon. As the others confront her as to whether she is alright with not seeing him off, Wolfrun appears and conjures a Key Hyper Akanbe. Hearing the support of her friends, Akane manages to regain her resolve and fight him off. After the Cures defeat the Akanbe, the girls help Akane get to the airport to see Brian off properly.
37	29	"Candidate Chloe" / "Reika's Worries! A Noble Heart and a Noble Vote!!""; Transliteration: "Reika no Nayami! Kiyoki Kokoro to Kiyoki Ippyō!!" (Japanese: れいかの悩み！清き心と清き一票！！)	October 28, 2012	August 26, 2016	5.6
As the elections for student council president begins, Reika has no intention of running as she feels she hasn't decided what path to take yet. But changes her mind when three troublemaking transfer students throw their hats into the election with false promises of no homework, manga, video games, and extra snacks to win votes. Despite Reika's good intentions, she has trouble getting the student body's support. On the day of the election, Reika struggles to plead her case when she and the others learn the transfer students are the commanders in disquse when Akaoni and Majorina tripped and are forced to retreat once exposed. But Wolfrun remains while extracting negative energy from the students and exploiting Reika's confused state in a Ballot Box Hyper Akanbe. But Miyuki and the others manage to encourage Reika by saying how she taught them the importance of studying, giving Reika her inspiration as they defeat the Akanbe. Following the battle, Reika resumes her electoral battle against Wolfrun and wins when her earnest wishes to improve the school reach the student body.
38	30	"The Glitter Kids" / "Hustling Nao! The Pretty Cure Become Kids~!?""; Transliteration: "Hassuru Nao! PuriKyua ga Kodomo ni Na~ru!?" (Japanese: ハッスルなお！プリキュアがコドモニナ～ル！？)	November 11, 2012	August 26, 2016	5.3
Nao meets up with her friends when they all get turned into little kids by one of Majorina's potions, which also effected Wolfrun and Akaoni before the latter tossed it into the human world. As Nao tries to remain responsible while they try to find Majorina, the girls run into Wolfrun and Akaoni and they all end up playing before Majorina finds them. Majorina exploits the turn of events in an Acorn Hyper Akanbe even after the transformed Pretty Cure find their attacks have no effect. But the girls are restored as the result of infighting between Wolfrun and Akaoni over getting the antidote and defeating the Akanbe, Nao learning from the experience to let loose from her big sister duties.
39	31	"A Fairytale Ending" / "What's Going On!? Miyuki's Nonsensical Cinderella""; Transliteration: "Dōnatchauno!? Miyuki no Hachamecha Shinderera" (Japanese: どうなっちゃうの！？みゆきのはちゃめちゃシンデレラ)	November 18, 2012	August 26, 2016	6.5
While in the school library, Miyuki finds a strange white "Cinderella" book that sucks her in to Candy's horror as she alerts the others. Pop arrives and reveals the book is an Origin Book, a magical book from Märchenland whose alternation would effect all other Cinderella stories, with Miyuki playing the protagonist. The Bad End commanders attempt to steal the book to rewrite it to have a bad ending, only for them, the girls and Candy to be sucked into the book and assuming the character roles. Majorina, Wolfrun, and Akaoni take up the role of Cinderella's wicked stepmother and stepsisters, making Miyuki's life miserable while preventing her to reach the ball by capturing the Fairy Godmother, Yayoi. They are soon aided by some helpful critters, Akane and Nao as the mice while Candy is the lizard, and they soon make their way to the ball, only to be stopped in their tracks by Wolfrun. But Miyuki doesn't give up and with help from Yayoi, manages to reach the ball to dance with the Prince, played by Reika. Following the commanders' two last ditch efforts with the glass slipper through Wolfrun's Akanbe and replacing it with a fake, Miyuki and her friends ensure the story's happy ending as they return to the real world.
40	32	"The Greatest Treasure" / "Hot-Blooded! Akane's Treasure Hunting Life!!""; Transliteration: "Nekketsu! Akane no Takara Sagashi Jinsei!!" (Japanese: 熱血！あかねの宝さがし人生！！)	November 25, 2012	August 26, 2016	5.1
Akane begins to ponder what her most treasured thing is after her class is assign to write a report on their personal treasure, being visited by her friends when she receives a letter from Brian before they give her a handmade good luck charm they made in secret for her volleyball match. But Akane is confronted the next day by Wolfrun, whom Joker threatened to revert back to his original form if he fails again. Given the choice of a Pretty Cure member to attack one-on-one, Wolfrun decides to settles things with Akane in a Volleyball Hyper Akanbe and overpowers her while destroying her charm to break her psychologically. But Akane regains her resolve after hearing Wolfrun deciding to target Miyuki next, realizing her true treasure is her bonds with her friends as she overpowers him. The Wolfrun Hyper Akanbe attempts to strike back, but is defeated when the rest of the Pretty Cure arrive.
41	33	"Goldenlight" / "I'm a Manga Artist!? Yayoi has Illustrated Future Dreams!!""; Transliteration: "Watashi ga Mangaka!? Yayoi ga Egaku Shōrai no Yume!!" (Japanese: 私がマンガ家！？やよいが描く将来の夢！！)	December 2, 2012	August 26, 2016	4.7
Having been praised by the others for her character designs, Yayoi decides to enter a manga contest by creating a story based on her childhood character Miracle Peace. But resolving to complete the manga on her own while struggling with the upcoming deadline, Yayoi cracks under the pressure of high expectations and runs off. She ends up running into Akaoni after he was threatened by Joker of being reverted to his original state if he fails again, using Yayoi's manga to create a Hyper Akanbe in the form of her antagonist. Though overwhelmed, Yayoi puts her faith in her character and her love of drawing as it awakens her new power to fight back against the Akaoni Hyper Akanbe, before the others join her to defeat him. With her spark reignited, Yayoi completes her manga.
42	34	"April's Babysitting Blues" / "Protect it! Nao and her Family's Precious Bonds!!""; Transliteration: "Mamorinuke! Nao to Kazoku no Taisetsu na Kizuna!!" (Japanese: 守り抜け！なおと家族のたいせつな絆！！)	December 9, 2012	August 26, 2016	5.1
As her mother goes into hospital to deliver her seventh child, Nao is put in charge of looking after her siblings. While Nao prepares curry for her family, her younger siblings, Hina and Yuuta, sneak off to find apples for the curry without telling her. As Nao and the other siblings, Keita, Haru, and Kouta, search for them, Majorina takes advantage of the situation following her being threatened by Joker of being reverted to her original state. Majorina traps Hina and Yuuta in an apple cage she uses to create a Hyper Akanbe, forcing Nao to transform in front of her siblings as the witch targets them. Nao gets heavily wounded to the point her siblings stand up for her, her desire to protect them awakening her hidden power as she overwhelms the Majorina Hyper Akanbe before Majorina powers it up by assuming her younger form. But the rest of the Pretty Cure arrive and to save Keita, Haru, and Kouta from the Akanbe's attack while freeing Hina and Yuuta before defeating Majorina. As Nao's siblings assumed that the fight was a dream, the kids, Nao and the others go to the hospital to see her new baby sister, Yui.
43	35	"Abroad Decision" / "Reika's Path! I will Study Overseas!!""; Transliteration: "Reika no Michi! Watashi, Ryūgaku Shimasu!!" (Japanese: れいかの道！私、留学します！！)	December 16, 2012	August 26, 2016	5.2
Reika is informed that she has been accepted for the one-year study program in England she signed up for months ago, everyone supporting her yet she feels uncertain as her grandfather advises to consider which path she should take. As Reika's friends keep a brave face so she would not feel guilty, she is confronted by Joker as he spirits her to pocket dimension and uses a Mirror Hyper Akanbe to exploit her dilemma to the point of canceling Reika's transformation from breaking her. Joker was about to kill Reika when her friends arrive and admit that they don't want Reika to leave them. Seeing her friends' tears, Reika realizes that she doesn't want to leave them either and awakens her hidden power, overcoming Joker after he absorbed his Hyper Akanbe before splitting off from his monster to shield himself from the Pretty Cures' attack. With her resolve affirmed, Reika turns down the overseas study to stay with her friends for another year.
44	36	"The Gift of Friendship" / "Secrets of a Smile! Miyuki and the Real Ultra Happy!!""; Transliteration: "Egao no Himitsu! Miyuki to Hontō no Urutora Happī!!" (Japanese: 笑顔のひみつ！みゆきと本当のウルトラハッピー！！)	December 23, 2012	August 26, 2016	5.5
While Christmas shopping with her friends, Miyuki has a brief run in with a young girl carrying a small mirror which reminds her of the mirror that her grandmother gave her when she was little. Miyuki tells her friends how her grandmother gave her a mirror to practice smiling on to build her confidence in making friends, helped by a mysterious girl whom she assumed to be a spirit within the mirror. After telling the others her story, Miyuki encounters the girl she met before, Yura, who was separated from her mother. As Miyuki waits with Yura, she is suddenly confronted by a desperate Wolfrun as he uses a black nose to attack in a House Hyper Akanbe, Wolfrun unleashes a barrage of attacks on Miyuki, but her determination to protect everyone's smiles awakens her hidden power and fights back before the others join her in defeating him. After Yura is reunited with her mother, Miyuki feels that she has found what truly makes her happy.
45	37	"The Miracle Jewel" / "The Beginning of the End! The Pretty Cure vs. the Three Subordinates!!""; Transliteration: "Owari no Hajimari! Purikyua tai Sankanbu!!" (Japanese: 終わりの始まり！プリキュア対三幹部！！)	January 6, 2013	August 26, 2016	3.3
When Pierrot's Egg approaches Earth, the Royale Clock suddenly transforms Candy into a strange gem which Joker realizes is the Miracle Jewel he has been looking for. Joker gives the three commanders one last chance by giving them a black nose to use on themselves to assume Hyper forms while warning them that the process may kill them. The three commanders are left with no choice as they transform themselves and overpower the Pretty Cure, revealing that they allied with Pierrot because they were promised revenge on those who wronged them because of the prejudice they suffered as fairy tale villains. The Pretty Cure, now knowing the truth, express empathy towards the commanders as they are consumed by their darkness. But Miyuki's power activates, bringing the commanders into her consciousness where she expresses her gratitude towards their role in fairy tales which purges the evil within them and restores their true forms as Märchenland fairies Ururun, Onini and Majorin. Before the girls can claim the final Cure Décor, Joker steals it and revealed that he used the fight to complete Pierrot's resurrection. Joker then combines the commanders' evil with the Cure Décor and five cards to create evil clones of the girls: the Bad End Pretty Cure.
46	38	"The Shadow Force" / "The Worst Possible Ending!? Bad End Pretty Cure!!""; Transliteration: "Saiaku no Ketsumatsu!? Baddo Endo Purikyua!!" (Japanese: 最悪の結末！？バッドエンドプリキュア！！)	January 13, 2013	August 26, 2016	5.0
Joker traps the Pretty Cure into separate dimensions to fight against their evil counterparts while proceeding to attack Pop, revealing his intent to destroy the Miracle Jewel and with it everyone's last hope. Just as Joker attacks Pop, Queen appears from the Royale Clock with Joker realizing she is a hologram. Queen reveals Candy as her heir, Joker deducing the whole myth of the Miracle Jewel being a façade and that it is only a cocoon for Candy's transformation before his resumed extraction of negative energy for Pierrot reduces the Earth into a desert. The Pretty Cure refuse to allow this as they activate their hidden powers, defeating their clones and retrieving the final Cure Décor. But Joker reveals that Pierrot has been fully revived before dissolving into a puddle of black ink to absorbed back into his creator as Pierrot's Shadow Giants manifest. Pop places the last Cure Décor into the Décor Décor, causing the Miracle Jewel to open up and reveal Candy in a new human-like form.
47	39	"The Queen of Jubiland" / "Pierrot's Strongest Advent! Unrelinquishing Power and the Light of Hope!!""; Transliteration: "Saikyō Piēro Kōrin! Akiramenai Chikara to Kibō no Hikari!!" (Japanese: 最強ピエーロ降臨！あきらめない力と希望の光！！)	January 20, 2013	August 26, 2016	5.0
As Candy awakens in her new form, Royale Candy, Queen fades away from using up the last of her lifeforce while giving Candy the real Miracle Jewel and the still blank Pretty Cure Book. Candy attempts to suppress the Shadow Giants before Pierrot manifests his corporeal form, summoning an army of regenerative shadow monsters to get the book. Despite their attempts to stop his army, Pierrot strains the Pretty Cure Book with the girls sinking into despair. Candy comes under assault from Pierrot while using the Miracle Jewel to snap her friends out of it before being knocked back to her usual form. But the Pretty Cure save her while assuming their Royale Forms to wipe out Pierrot's army and destroy him. But Pierrot true self appears while absorbing his army and Earth's negative energy to transform into a swirling black hole to engulf the entire planet.
48	40	"Friends Forever" / "The Lights Shining to the Future! Deliver it! The Greatest Smile!!""; Transliteration: "Hikari Kagayaku Mirai e! Todoke! Saikō no Sumairu!!" (Japanese: 光輝く未来へ！届け！最高のスマイル！！)	January 27, 2013	August 26, 2016	5.3
The Pretty Cure attempt to stop Pierrot, but their attack fails as his strike takes a huge chunk of the Earth while canceling their transformation with their Smile Pacts petrified. While Pop notes the Miracle Jewel could allow them to transform one last time, it would close the portals linking Earth to Märchenland which saddens everyone. But Candy asks her friends what is more dear to them, assuring them that they will remain friends no matter what. Resolving to protect the future, the Pretty Cure and Candy use the Miracle Jewel to transform and use their combined power to kill Pierrot once and for all with Earth restored. The victory, however, is short lived as the girls see Candy and Pop off as they return to Märchenland before they return to their everyday lives. However, sometime later, Candy eventually found another portal that allows her to reunite with Miyuki and the others.

== See also ==
- Smile Precure! the Movie: Big Mismatch in a Picture Book! – An animated film based on the series.
- Pretty Cure All Stars New Stage: Friends of the Future – The fourth film in the Pretty Cure All Stars crossover series, which stars the Smile Pretty Cures.
