= List of Suite PreCure episodes =

- Season 8
- Cover of the first DVD release featuring Cure Melody, Cure Rhythm, Hummy and the Fairy Tones
- No. of episodes: 48

Release
- Original network: ANN (ABC)
- Original release: February 6, 2011 – January 29, 2012

Series chronology
- ← Previous; HeartCatch PreCure Next → Smile PreCure!

Suite PreCure is the eighth Pretty Cure anime television series produced by Toei Animation. It follows Hibiki Hojo and Kanade Minamino who become Cure Melody and Cure Rhythm in order to stop the evil Mephisto who plans to cover the world in the Melody of Sorrow. The series began airing in Japan from February 6, 2011, to January 29, 2012, replacing HeartCatch PreCure! in its initial timeslot and was succeeded by Smile PreCure!. From episodes 1 until 23, the opening theme is "La La La Suite PreCure" (ラ♪ラ♪ラ♪スイートプリキュア♪, Ra Ra Ra Suīto Purikyua) by Mayu Kudo while the ending theme is "Wonderful Powerful Music!!" (ワンダフル↑パワフル↑ミュージック!!, Wandafuru Pawafuru Myūjikku!!) by Aya Ikeda. From episodes 24–48, the opening theme is "La La La Suite PreCure (Unlimited ver.)" (ラ♪ラ♪ラ♪スイートプリキュア♪～∞UNLIMITED∞ ver～, Ra Ra Ra Suīto Purikyua (Unlimited ver.)) by Kudo, while the ending theme is "Kibō Rainbow" (#キ1ボウレインボウ#, Kibō Reinbō; "Rainbow of Hope") by Ikeda.

== Episode list ==
No.	Title	Original air date
1	"Nyapunyapu! The Suite PreCure are Born"; Transliteration: "Nyapunyapu! Suīto Purikyua Tanjō Nya♪" (Japanese: ニャプニャプ~！スイートプリキュア誕生ニャ♪)	February 6, 2011
In Major Land, a fairy named Hummy is about to sing the Melody of Happiness, which spreads cheer throughout the land. Meanwhile, Hibiki Hojo and Kanade Minamino, two girls who used to be best friends, have not gotten along with each other for a while. Siren attempts to steal the Golden G-Clefs within their hearts. Noticing their hearts sync up perfectly, Hummy gives Hibiki and Kanade the ability to transform into the Suite PreCures, Cure Melody and Cure Rhythm.
2	"No! The PreCure Might Split Up!"; Transliteration: "Gaga~n! Hayaku mo Purikyua Kaisan no Kiki Nya!" (Japanese: ガガ~ン！早くもプリキュア解散の危機ニャ!)	February 13, 2011
Hibiki and Kanade cannot get their hearts in sync and soon drop out of their transformation, letting the Negatone run rampage. As Hummy inquires over why the two do not get along, Hibiki reveals that she was waiting for Kanade by a cherry blossom tree on the opening ceremony of school, but she never came. With their confusion cleared up, the two manage to face off against the Negatone and defeat it, allowing Hummy to purify it back into a Note and keep it safe.
3	"Tada~! Hibiki Hates Music?"; Transliteration: "Jaja~n! Hibiki wa Ongaku Kirai Nya?" (Japanese: ジャジャ~ン！響は音楽嫌いニャ？)	February 20, 2011
As Hibiki is questioned about why she is the only one in town who hates music, she reveals about her childhood. When Hibiki nervously entered a piano contest so it can be treated to a trip to an amusement park, her father, Dan, told her that her music wasn't "true music", which left her saddened with a bitterness for music. One of their classmates, Masamune Ouji, is also having trouble learning for Dan about playing true music. During a piano tournament, a Negatone attacks and Hibiki and Kanade struggle against it. During the battle, Dan plays music to distract the Negatone so the PreCure can defeat it, eventually revealing that 'true music' can only be played if you enjoy playing it. Afterwards, Hibiki comes to understand her father's words and starts practising on the piano with Kanade.
4	"Mogumogu! Kanade's Screaming Recipe Nya♪"; Transliteration: "Mogumogu! Kanade ga Miseru Kiai no Reshipi Nya♪" (Japanese: モグモグ！奏が見せる気合のレシピニャ♪)	February 27, 2011
Kanade wants to enter a cake contest to impress her baking idol, Yoko Yamaguchi, but is having trouble coming up with ideas that would impress. Siren decides to disguise herself as Yoko and give Kanade private lessons to make some controversial cake designs. This causes her to come into conflict with Hibiki.
5	"Slapstick! The Television Reporter's Challenge Nya♪"; Transliteration: "Dotabata! Terebi Repōtā ni Chōsenda Nya♪" (Japanese: ドタバタ！テレビレポーターに挑戦だニャ♪)	March 6, 2011
Hibiki's mother, Maria, calls and says that she volunteers Kanade and Hibiki to do a TV report on the town. Kanade and Hibiki do not really want to do it but get sucked in by the perks and go ahead anyway. Although the two initially clash with each other's style of reporting, they end up having fun. Siren attempts to get on camera to play the Melody of Sorrow, but is thwarted and instead make a Negatone which the PreCure fight.
6	"Gamigami! The Miracle Belltier Appears Nya♪"; Transliteration: "Gamigami! Osekkyo ga Unda Mirakuru Berutie Nya♪" (Japanese: ガミガミ！お説教が生んだミラクルベルティエニャ♪)	March 20, 2011
When Souta decides to make something for Kanade for White Day, Hibiki agrees to help him out in making a cake. However, Kanade yells at Souta for making a mess in the kitchen, causing him to become upset and run off, where he is trapped after Siren makes a Negatone out of his cake. As Kanade fights to reach Souta, Hibiki's desire to protect their sibling bonds grants her a new weapon. Afterwards, Kanade apologises to Souta and accepts the gift, only to find it is filled with wasabi.
7	"Tettekete~! Press Mr. Otokichi on his Secret Nya♪"; Transliteration: "Tettekete~! Otokichi-san no Himitsu Ni Semaru Nya♪" (Japanese: テッテケテ~！音吉さんの秘密に迫るニャ♪)	March 27, 2011
As Hibiki and Kanade are leaving a church where they practice piano, they notice a doll left behind by the organ keeper, Otokichi Shirabe. They decide to try to return it, searching all around the city for him but having no such luck. When they almost forget the doll, it is transformed into a Negatone, which the PreCure fight.
8	"Chararan! Siren's Fake Friendship Plan Nya♪"; Transliteration: "Chararān! Seirēn no Nise Shinnyū Daisakusen Nya♪" (Japanese: チャララーン！セイレーンのニセ親友大作戦ニャ♪)	April 3, 2011
While Siren disguising herself as a transfer student named Sakura, Siren uses her knowledge to strike up a friendship with Hibiki in order to separate her from Kanade. However, when Hibiki sprains her ankle during a judo match, Kanade's true friendship shines through. Siren's cover is soon blown and she ends up making a Headband Negatone for the PreCure to fight.
9	"Hanyanya? What is the Thing Kanade Lacks Nya?"; Transliteration: "Hanyanya? Kanade ni Tarinai Monotte Nani Nya?" (Japanese: ハニャニャ？奏に足りないものって何ニャ？)	April 10, 2011
Kanade is a little downhearted that she doesn't have a Belltier like Hibiki's and feels she is always relying on her. With Hummy saying the Berthier came from Hibiki's "Precure Power", Kanade tries to imitate Hibiki's appetite and sports ability to no avail. When Hibiki's arm gets injured in the fight, Kanade's desire to protect everyone grants her the Fantastic Berthier, which allows her to defeat the Negatone.
10	"Hohoho! Hibiki-sensei, Struggle at the Kindergarten Nya♪"; Transliteration: "Uhhohhō! Hibiki-sensei, Yōchien de Dai Funtō Nya♪" (Japanese: ウッホッホー！響先生、幼稚園で大奮闘ニャ♪)	April 17, 2011
Hibiki's father asks Hibiki, Kanade, and Ouji to help teach music at a kindergarten, which proves to be no easy feat. The next day, Ouji saves Siren before she is hit by a car. Later that day, Hibiki manages to get the kids excited about learning music by having them act like gorillas. After a successful recital, the kids give Hibiki and Kanade gifts containing notes. As Siren hesitates due to Ouji's presence, one of her stooges, Bassdrum, transforms them into Gorilla Negatones which Hibiki and Kanade defeat. Afterwards, Bassdrum denounces Siren as their leader.
11	"Gyogyogyo! The Mysterious PreCure Appears Nya!"; Transliteration: "Gyogyogyo! Nazo no Purikyua Arawaru Nya!" (Japanese: ギョギョギョ！謎のプリキュア現るニャ!)	April 24, 2011
Hibiki and Kanade decide to enter a music contest together. On the day of the contest, they realise they don't have a piano to perform on, but their friend Waon Nishijima helps them out. However, it is soon revealed that the contest is a trap laid out by Bassdrum who spreads the Melody of Sorrow and creates some Cymbal Negatones. As Hibiki and Kanade struggle to fight against it, a mysterious masked Cure known as Cure Muse appears and ensnares the Negatones, allowing Kanade to purify them.
12	"Ririn♪ Tell Us About Cure Muse Nya♪"; Transliteration: "Rirīn♪ Kyua Myūzu no Koto Oshiete Nya♪" (Japanese: リンリーン♪キュアミューズのこと教えてニャ♪)	May 1, 2011
Hibiki and Kanade become curious about Muse' identity, while Hummy informs Aphrodite concerning her as well. As Hummy encounters the Minor Trio as they search for Siren, a Note is found and transformed into a Car Negatone.
13	"Mumumu~n! Siren and Hummy's Secret Nya♪"; Transliteration: "Mumumu~n! Seirēn to Hami no Himitsu Nya♪" (Japanese: ムムム～ン！セイレーンとハミィの秘密ニャ♪)	May 8, 2011
Siren decides to leave the Minor Trio, then Hummy then explains the history of when she and Siren were best friends. When some other fairies tried to play a trick on Hummy during a singing contest, Siren helped Hummy out, allowing her to earn the chance to sing the Melody of Happiness. Siren becomes moved by Hummy's words of friendship. Siren creates a Negatone from the music sheet which corners Hibiki and Kanade, but Cure Muse appears again, encouraging them to defeat it. After the battle, Hibiki, Kanade and Hummy must find a way to convince Siren back to her good self.
14	"Awawawa~! Muse vs. Muse, Who Is the Real One Nya?"; Transliteration: "Awawawa~! Myūzu tai Myūzu, Honmono wa Dotchi Nya?" (Japanese: アワワワ～！ミューズ対ミューズ、本物はどっちニャ？)	May 15, 2011
As Siren comes up with an idea to take advantage of Cure Muse' appearance, Hibiki and Kanade continue to struggle in their hunt for her identity. Meanwhile, Muse allegedly calls out Hibiki and Kanade, but in reality, it is Siren who steals the girls' Cure Modules and throws them into the sea. However, they are saved by the real Muse, who reveals the fake one. Siren creates a Seaweed Negatone, while Hummy recovers the girl's modules so they can transform.
15	"Attracted~! Kanade's Lucky Spoon Nya♪"; Transliteration: "Meromero~! Kanade no Rakkī Supūn Nya♪" (Japanese: メロメロ～！奏のラッキースプーンニャ♪)	May 22, 2011
With Ouji's birthday approaching, his friends ask Kanade to help with preparations for a party to be held at her family's cupcake cafe. Kanade hopes to prepare him a lot of cupcakes to be eaten with a "lucky spoon". On the due date, Siren casts a spell on Ouji to make him fall asleep, only to be found in a dubious position when Hibiki and Kanade arrive. Siren creates a Negatone out of one of the lucky spoons, causing the Pretty Cures to have bad luck. However, they manage to overcome their misfortune and defeat the Negatone. As Ouji wakes up, he shows a kind approach towards Siren before going to his party.
16	"Ding Dong! Best Friends Switching Places Nya♪"; Transliteration: "Pinpōn! Kōkan Sutei de Besuto Furendo Nya♪" (Japanese: ピンポーン！交換ステイでベストフレンドニャ♪)	May 29, 2011
After Siren tricks Hibiki into getting another fight with Kanade, the two discover they have been entered into a "Best Friends" tournament. Wanting them to make up, Hummy suggests that they each spend a day in each other's shoes. As such, Hibiki spends some time with Kanade's family while Kanade stays over at Hibiki's house, where she starts to understand some of Hibiki's loneliness when her busy parents aren't around. With the two making up with each other by the next morning, Siren attempts to spoil their friendship, saying she shouldn't stay with Kanade.
17	"Ururun! Mama is Always by her Child's Side Nya♪"; Transliteration: "Ururun! Mama wa Itsudemo Kodomo no Mikatana no Nya♪" (Japanese: ウルルン！ママはいつでも子供の味方なのニャ♪)	June 5, 2011
When Hibiki tries to spend some quality time with Maria before her flight back to France, Siren disguises herself as Hibiki and unleashes a Controller Negatone to spread the Melody of Sadness. Afterwards, Hibiki and Maria spend a little more time together, where Maria reveals her wish is to have the whole family perform on stage together. As Maria heads back to France, Hibiki desires to become a top pianist.
18	"Fuwawan! Collecting Notes Isn't Easy Nya!"; Transliteration: "Fuwawa~n! Onpu Atsume mo Raku Janai Nya!" (Japanese: フワワ～ン！音符集めも楽じゃないニャ！)	June 12, 2011
As both Aphrodite and Mephisto contemplate going to the Human World, Hummy detects a large number of Notes around and orders Hibiki and Kanade to help catch them, despite the fact they cannot see themselves. Afterwards, Cure Muse releases the Notes she recovered from the Minor gang, while Aphrodite and Mephisto change their minds.
19	"Gunya Gunya! The PreCure Can't Transform Nya!"; Transliteration: "Gunya Gunya~! Purikyua ni Henshin Dekinai Nya!" (Japanese: グニャグニャ~！プリキュアに変身できないニャ！)	June 26, 2011
Siren pretends to be Hummy, but after the girls realize it is a trick, she splits them in alternate dimension and spreads sorrow throughout the land, knowing they will be unable to stop the sorrow.
20	"Aaaah~♪ Siren's Last Scheme Nya!"; Transliteration: "Aaaaa~♪ Seirēn, Saigo no Sakusen Nya!" (Japanese: アアアアア~♪セイレーン、最後の作戦ニャ！)	July 3, 2011
Siren is given another chance to defeat Pretty Cure and after listening to the evil noise, pretends to have switched sides.
21	"Boom! The PreCure of Miracle is Born!!"; Transliteration: "Dokkun! Kiseki no Purikyua Tanjō Nya!!" (Japanese: ドックン！奇跡のプリキュア誕生ニャ!!)	July 10, 2011
Mephisto invades Kanon Town and sets up a stage to perform the Melody of Sorrow. Aphrodite talks to Hibiki and Kanade, asking them to believe in Hummy. As Mephisto tortures Hummy with the Melody of Sorrow, Siren turns against him and tries to free the Notes, but Mephisto turns them into a Negatone. Hummy manages to free herself and the Fairy Tones, allowing the girls to transform.
22	"Lala♪ The Soulful Tune, Her Name is Cure Beat!!"; Transliteration: "Rarā♪ Tamashii no Shirabe, Sono na wa Kyua Bīto Nya!!" (Japanese: ララー♪魂の調べ、その名はキュアビートニャ!!)	July 17, 2011
As the Cures tries to determine how Siren became a Pretty Cure, Siren feels she cannot be forgiven and seeks comfort in Otokichi.
23	"Zazan! A Tear is the World's Smallest Ocean!"; Transliteration: "Zaza~n! Namida wa Sekai de Ichiban Chiisana Umi Nya!" (Japanese: ザザ~ン！涙は世界で一番ちいさな海ニャ！)	July 24, 2011
Hibiki, Kanade, and Hummy attempt to plead with Siren, now a human girl named Ellen, to join them. However, she suffers from feeling lost and is unable to forgive herself.
24	"Sansan! Become friends with Sand-Hummy!"; Transliteration: "Sansan! Osuna no Hamyi de Yūjō no Kansei Nya!" (Japanese: サンサン！お砂のハミィで友情の完成ニャ！)	July 31, 2011
Hibiki and Kanade decide to take Ellen to the beach, where the Lucky Spoon is holding a sand art contest. When Ellen accidentally ruins the Sand Hummy they built, Hibiki and Kanade make sure that it will not ruin their friendship. Just as they finish rebuilding their Sand Hummy, Trio Minor appear and transform it into a Negatone. Despite not winning the contest, Ellen admits she had fun.
25	"Hyu~ Doro~! I Found Ellen's Weakness Nya!"; Transliteration: "Hyu~ Doro~! Ellen no Jakuten Mitsuketa Nya!" (Japanese: ヒュ~ドロ~！エレンの弱点見つけたニャ！)	August 7, 2011
A summer festival is held at Hibiki and Kanade's school, where Ellen's fear of monsters is revealed. Feeling she is being bullied by Hibiki and Kanade, Ellen runs away and encounters Ouji, who helps ease her worries. However, Ellen is not fooled by Bassdrum's plan and retrieves the Modules so she and her friends can transform together and fight the Negatone. Afterwards, Ellen decides to go through the haunted house, saying she has nothing to fear if her friends are by her side.
26	"Pipopapo♪ The Fairy Tones' Great Adventure Nya♪"; Transliteration: "Pipopapo♪ Fearī Tōn no Daibōken Nya♪" (Japanese: ピポパポ♪フェアリートーンの大冒険ニャ♪)	August 14, 2011
The Minor Trio kidnap the Fairy Tones, Dory, Rery and Lary, which allow the Pretty Cures to transform. As they create a Fan Negatone, Tiry goes to rescue the other tones but gets captured herself. As Hummy and the other Tones manage to help save Tiry, the Pretty Cures struggle against the combined power of the Negatone and the Minor Trio. However, the Minor Trio manage to escape with a good deal of Notes that they stole from the Fairy Tones.
27	"Kachi Kachi! 30 Minutes to Save the World Nya!"; Transliteration: "Kachi Kachi! Sanjū Bun de Sekai o Sukuu Nya!" (Japanese: カチッカチッ！30分で世界を救うニャ！)	August 21, 2011
Hibiki and friends prepare to go on a hiking trip that lasts 30 minutes. Meanwhile, the Minor Trio have a plan involving a radio tower, so Ellen decides to follow them. However, the Pretty Cure manage to arrive in time and defeat it, barely making it back home in time for the hiking trip.
28	"Heart-Pounding! Ellen's First Day of School Nya!"; Transliteration: "Dokidoki! Ellen Hajimete no Gakkō Seikatsu Nya!" (Japanese: ドキドキ！エレン初めての学校生活ニャ！)	August 28, 2011
As summer ends, Ellen decides that she wants to attend school with Hibiki and Kanade, later getting admitted thanks to Otokichi. Meanwhile, the Fairy Tones attempt to retrieve the Notes that the Minor Trio stole from them despite being exhausted. Minor Trio create a First Aid Kit Negatone, and the Fairy Tones are too weak to save the Cures, who are instead aided by Cure Muse. As the Fairy Tones tell about their Notes being stolen after the battle, Hibiki hears the voice once again, revealed to be that of the Crescendo Tone.
29	"Suspense! Treasure in Major Land Nya♪"; Transliteration: "Hara Hara! Meijā Rando de Takara Sagashi Nya♪" (Japanese: ハラハラ！メイジャーランドで宝探しニャ♪)	September 4, 2011
Hibiki, Kanade, Ellen and Hummy travel to Major Land where they meet Aphrodite. She tells them to go to the dark forest to seek out the Healing Chest, where the Crescendo Tone lies. As the Cures reach the forest entrance, they are sucked in and separated, each coming face to face with a stone golem. The three golems merge into one and hold Hummy and the Fairy Tones hostage, but the Cures manage to combine their resolve and defeat the golem. Afterwards, they find the Healing Chest and the Crescendo Tone, who heals the Fairy Tones, taking it back with them.
30	"Waon! The Healing Chest's Mystery Nya!"; Transliteration: "Waōn! Hīringu Chesuto no Fushigi Nya!" (Japanese: ワオーン！ヒーリングチェストの不思議ニャ！)	September 11, 2011
The Minor Trio learn about the Healing Chest and decide to investigate. Meanwhile, as Hibiki becomes downhearted after failing an English exam, mysterious musical incidents begin to occur around her. Afterwards, the Minor Trio create a Negatone from Hibiki's exam paper, which puts the Cures into an English test, attacking Hibiki for every question she gets wrong. The Cures do manage to defeat the Negatone.
31	"One Two! Power Up at PreCure Camp Nya!"; Transliteration: "Wan Tsū! Purikyua Kyanpu de Pawā Appu Nya!" (Japanese: ワンツー！プリキュアキャンプでパワーアップニャ！)	September 18, 2011
While trying to figure out how to become capable of accepting Crescendo Tone's power, Hibiki suggests to the others that they hold a PreCure camp in order to become stronger. The next day, Hibiki comes to learn that their power is the greatest while working as a team, working together to climb a mountain. Afterwards, they learn the Minor Trio has created a Steamroller Negatone to cause havoc in the city. With their Harmony Power increased thanks to their training, the Cures become able to use the Healing Chest's power.
32	"Oro Oro~! The Healing Chest is Stolen Nya!"; Transliteration: "Oro Oro~! Hīringu Chesuto ga Nusumareta Nya!" (Japanese: オロオロ~！ヒーリングチェストが盗まれたニャ！)	September 25, 2011
As Cure Muse seems concerned about the Pretty Cure's new power, Hibiki and the others participate in a flea market. The Minor Trio crash the market and steal the Healing Chest, but Muse takes it and replaces it with a fake version as they escape. When the Pretty Cure prepare to defeat it, the girl stands in their way, but they manage to get her to believe in them so they can return her doll to normal. After the battle, Ako returns the Healing Chest to the girls.
33	"Howawa~n! Everyone's Dreams Make Up PreCure's Power Nya!"; Transliteration: "Howawa~n! Minna no Yume wa Purikyua no Chikara Nya!" (Japanese: ホワワ~ン！みんなのゆめはプリキュアのちからニャ！)	October 2, 2011
Hibiki decides to enter a Piano Contest, but becomes uncertain when she learns her father is to become a judge for the same competition. On the day of the contest, Kanade gives Hibiki a special cupcake, saying her dream is to make people smile, encouraging Hibiki to aim for the same dream. As the Minor Trio create a Trumpet Negatone outside, Ellen stands alone to stop them from interrupting Hibiki and Kanade's contests. After the contest is finished, Hibiki asks her Dad to teach her piano like he used to.
34	"Zudodo~n! Mephisto is Finally Here Nya!"; Transliteration: "Zudodo~n! Mefisuto ga Yatte Kichatta Nya!" (Japanese: ズドド~ン！メフィストがやって来ちゃったニャ！)	October 9, 2011
As Mephisto arrives in the human world, Hibiki and the other Cures try to figure out what Muse' motives are while Ako helps a kitten stuck in a tree. Mephisto makes his move, creating a large Negatone in the middle of the city.
35	"Jakin! Muse is Finally Unmasked Nya!"; Transliteration: "Jakīn! Tsuini Myūzu ga Kamen o Totta Nya!" (Japanese: ジャキーン！遂にミューズが仮面をとったニャ！)	October 16, 2011
Despite having a lot of Notes, Mephisto finds he needs more to complete the Melody of Sorrow. As Hibiki and the others ask the Crescendo Tone what Muse' motives are, she tells them to think about what a Pretty Cure fights for, with Otokichi telling Dodory something similar. Although the Pretty Cure defeat the Negatone, Mephisto uses the Notes to power himself. Acknowledging the girl's desire to free Mephisto from his evil heart, Muse reveals herself to be Ako, who is actually Mephisto's daughter.
36	"Kiraran! Let Muse's Thoughts Reach His Heart Nya!"; Transliteration: "Kirarān! Kokoro ni Todoke, Myūzu no Omoi Nya!" (Japanese: キララーン！心に届け、ミューズの想いニャ！)	October 23, 2011
Ako is reluctant to fight Mephisto, but the other girls convince her to fight to return his heart to normal. She lands a resounding hit to his heart, which helps him realise who he is and returns him to his normal self. As the Minor Trio takes charge of completing the Melody of Sorrow, it is revealed the name of their true enemy is Noise.
37	"Wakuwaku! Everyone Transform for Halloween Nya!"; Transliteration: "Wakuwaku! Harouin de Minna Henshin Nya!" (Japanese: ワクワク！ハロウィンでみんなへんしんニャ！)	October 30, 2011
Falsetto leads the Minor Trio and transforms Bassdrum and Baritone into new monstrous forms. Meanwhile, Otokichi tells the girls how he once battled Noise and was able to seal away his power, but fears the power of the Melody of Sorrow may awaken him. Ako decides to stay in the human world to help the Pretty Cure defend it. Later, the town has a Halloween festival, and despite having some trouble getting into the mood, Ako soon comes to enjoy it. Soon, Falsetto appears and creates a Pumpkin Negatone, which Ako is determined to fight on her own before being reminded that she no longer has to. Falsetto's Melody of Sorrow manages to overwhelm Crescendo Tone's power, but the Pretty Cures manage to distract him while Ako defeats the Negatone. However, it seems Noise has broken free of its fossil.
38	"Clap Clap Clap♪ A Mysterious Encounter Becomes a New Beginning Nya!"; Transliteration: "PachiPachiPachi♪ Fushigi na Deai ga Arata na Hajimari Nya!" (Japanese: パチパチパチ♪不思議な出会いが新たな始まりニャ！)	November 13, 2011
While making preparations for Otokichi's birthday, Ako discovers a strange-looking bird, treating its injuries and naming it Pii. As Souta asks Ako about why she does not want to sing, Falsetto appears, creating a Negatone from a music box she got from her parents and taking Souta as a hostage. When Ako decides to protect her newfound family, the other Cures rescue Souta and defeat the Negatone. Afterwards, they celebrate Otokichi's birthday where Ako decides to sing for him.
39	"Fugya! All of the Notes Have Disappeared Nya!"; Transliteration: "Fugyā! Onpu ga Zēnbu Kiechatta Nya!" (Japanese: フギャー！音符がぜーんぶ消えちゃったニャ！)	November 20, 2011
Hummy wakes up to find all Notes have disappeared from the Fairy Tones. The girls get Otokichi to play his organ to attract more Notes so they can catch them. However, the Minor Trio arrive, creating a Soccer Ball Negatone and stealing the Notes they gathered. Using teamwork, the Cures manage to defeat the Negatone and recover the Notes. However, Pii is shown to contain the power of Noise, stealing all the Notes inside the Fairy Tones without them noticing.
40	"LuLuLu~! Raindrops are the Tune of the Goddess Nya!"; Transliteration: "Rururu~! Amaoto wa Megami no Shirabe Nya!" (Japanese: ルルル～！雨音は女神の調べニャ！)	November 27, 2011
As the girls wonder about the whereabouts of Noise, they arrive at the Shirabe House just in time to save Otokichi from a falling piece of wreckage caused by Pii. Otokichi suspects Pii of actually being Noise, which is proven to be true thanks to Hibiki. Afterwards, the Minor Trio arrive and create a Piano Negatone, which the Cures manage to defeat.
41	"Fafa! We'll Never Let You Have the Final Note Nya!"; Transliteration: "FaFa~♪ Saigo no Onpu wa Zettai Watasanai Nya !" (Japanese: ファファ~♪最後の音符はぜったい渡さないニャ！)	December 4, 2011
Falsetto discovers that the final Note they need to complete the Melody of Sorrow is inside the Fairy Tone, Fary, so he sends Bassdrum and Baritone to find it. As the girls learn of this plan and need to protect Fary from the trio, Hibiki comes up with the idea to put on a movie based around Fary, getting help from the townfolk and creating various fake Fary to throw them. Fary's overconfidence inevitably leads her to get captured, but the townfolk help to rescue her. However, Falsetto creates a Negatone from the Note inside her using all the fake Fary, with the real Fary trapped inside. While working together, the Cures manage to rescue Fary and defeat the Negatone, but Noise manages to steal the Note just as they try to retrieve it, allowing Falsetto to complete the Melody of Sorrow.
42	"Pikon Pikon! The Cure Modules are Targeted Nya!"; Transliteration: "Pikon Pikon! Nerawareta Kyua Mojūre Nya!" (Japanese: ピコンピコン！狙われたキュアモジューレニャ！)	December 11, 2011
Both the girls and the Minor Trio learn that as long as the girls have the Heart Tone Keys inside their Cure Modules, the Melody of Sorrow can't be completed. After Bassdrum and Baritone's less than stellar plans fail, Falsetto uses Noise's power to take control of Waon and Seika in order to steal the Cure Modules from the girls. However, these turn out to be fakes that Ako had prepared in secret. As Falsetto orders Waon and Seika to take the real Cure Modules, they fight Noise' hold and fall unconscious, scattering the Cure Modules. When Bassdrum and Baritone touch them, they return to their human forms and decide to return the Cure Modules to the girls as gratitude. However, they are put into Noise' control and transformed again. The Pretty Cures attempt to purify the evil with Crescendo Tone's power, but Noise's power stops them.
43	"Sob Sob... The Melody of Sorrow is Completed Nya!"; Transliteration: "Shiku Shiku... Fukō no Merodi ga Kanseishichatta Nya!" (Japanese: シクシク......不幸のメロディが完成しちゃったニャ！)	December 18, 2011
The Minor Trio infiltrate Major Land and capture Aphrodite, demanding the Cure Modules in exchange for her safety. The girls travel to Major Land to confront Falsetto and get the chance to transform after Mephisto helps rescue Aphrodite. As Mephisto fights Bassdrum and Baritone, who are powered up by Noise's power, the Cures fight against Falsetto who proves unfazed by their attacks. In order to return Bassdrum and Baritone to normal, Mephisto takes their Noise power into himself and puts his own life at risk in order to destroy it. When Bassdrum and Baritone receive great injury protecting Aphrodite from Falsetto's attack, the girls cannot bear it anymore and surrender their Heart Tone Keys, completing the Melody of Sorrow.
44	"Do Re La Do~♪ A Holy Night Gives Birth to a Miracle Nya!"; Transliteration: "DoReRaDo~♪ Seinaru Yoru ni Umare ta Kiseki Nya!" (Japanese: ドレラド~♪ 聖なる夜に生まれた奇跡ニャ！)	December 25, 2011
Otokichi announces the completion of his pipe organ, ready for a concert on Christmas Day. However, on the day of the concert, Falsetto arrives to sing the Melody of Sorrow, with Otokichi's efforts of stopping it thwarted by Noise, who evolves into his true form, turns all of Kanon Town's inhabitants into stone and creates a Negatone from the Legendary Score to attack the girls before escaping to attack Major Land. When Otokichi strives to protect the girls, Hibiki notices the sorrow within the Legendary Score and expresses her own feelings. As the others back her up, their feelings reach the Legendary Score, who returns their Heart Tone Keys, allowing them to transform and defeat the Negatone, returning the score to its original state. Using the Shirabe House as an airship, the Cures and Otokichi travel to Major Land to stop Noise.
45	"Vo~n♪ We Won't Let Noise Have His Way Nya!"; Transliteration: "Vo~n♪ Noizu no Sukiniwa Sasenai Nya!" (Japanese: ブォ～ン♪ノイズのすきにはさせないニャ！)	January 8, 2012
Because the Cures struggle to fight against Noise, Otokichi arrives with his organ to provide a chance to seal him. However, the Notes Noise had managed to absorb allows him to overpower the sealing technique and he seals Otokichi away. As Noise attempts to seal away Crescendo Tone as well, the Cures power up and manage to severely damage Noise, but are interrupted by Falsetto. Noise attempts to seal the Cures away, but Crescendo Tone rescues them and is sealed away instead.
46	"Zukon! PreCure's Final Battle Nya!"; Transliteration: "Zukōn! Purikyua Saigo no Tatakai Nya!" (Japanese: ズゴーン！プリキュア最後の戦いニャ！)	January 15, 2012
Noise absorbs Falsetto after becoming irritated by him, allowing him to regain his strength and return to face the Cures, who are reinvigoured by Hibiki's words. Noise attempts to absorb Hibiki, but she is saved by the arrival of Bassdrum and Baritone, who are absorbed instead, causing him to change into a more powerful form. Despite the Cures' best efforts, they are overpowered by Noise. Aphrodite and the remaining citizens of Major Land choose to play a melody before Noise turns them all into stone. With the land shrouded in silence, the Fairy Tones remind the Cures that as long as they have even the smallest of music, they have hope.
47	"Pikān! Let Everyone Hear the Symphony of Hope Nya!"; Transliteration: "Pikān! Minna de Kanaderu Kibō no Kumikyōku Nya!" (Japanese: ピカーン！みんなで奏でる希望の組曲ニャ！)	January 22, 2012
Hibiki senses that Noise is suffering himself, refusing to fight against him. When Noise attempts to absorb Hibiki, Hummy jumps inside him with the Legendary Score and sings a newly written melody in a bid to purify the Notes within him, encouraging the girls to transform and fight again and try to reach Noise' feelings. As the Pretty Cures desire to see Noise' smile and Hummy's determination peak, the Fairy Tones combine into a new Crescendo Tone, which grants the Pretty Cures Crescendo forms. Together, the girls manage to combine their powers and purify Noise, who smiles before disappearing.
48	"LaLaLa~♪ Let The World Echo The Melody of Happiness Nya!"; Transliteration: "Rarara~♪ Sekai ni Hibike, Shiawase no Merodi Nya!" (Japanese: ラララ~♪ 世界に響け、幸福のメロディニャ！)	January 29, 2012
Following Noise' defeat, Hummy manages to return all the Notes to the Legendary Score, but falls unconscious afterwards. As Hibiki gets Ellen to play a song to try to wake up Hummy, they and the others find themselves in Hummy's dream world, but Hummy doesn't seem to be able to see them. The girls manage to get Hummy's attention by singing together and she eventually manages to wake up. With all the preparations made, Hummy sings the Melody of Happiness, restoring music to Major Land and freeing everyone from their stone prisons. Upon returning to Kanon Town, the girls find a newly born Noise chick, reborn from happiness.

== See also ==
- Suite PreCure the Movie: Take it back! The Miraculous Melody that Connects Hearts - An animated film based on the series.
- Pretty Cure All Stars DX3: Deliver the Future! The Rainbow-Colored Flower That Connects the World – The third Pretty Cure All Stars crossover film which stars the Suite Pretty Cures.
