= List of HeartCatch PreCure! episodes =

- Season 7
- Cover of the final Blu-ray release featuring the main Cures in their Super Silhouette forms.
- No. of episodes: 49

Release
- Original network: ANN (ABC)
- Original release: February 7, 2010 – January 30, 2011

Series chronology
- ← Previous; Fresh Pretty Cure! Next → Suite PreCure

HeartCatch PreCure! is the seventh Pretty Cure anime television series produced by Toei Animation. It follows four teenage girls who become Pretty Cure in order to fight back against the evil Desert Apostles and stop them from destroying the Great Tree of Hearts and turning the world into a desert.

The series aired in Japan from February 7, 2010, to January 30, 2011, replacing Fresh PreCure! in its initial timeslot, and was succeeded by Suite PreCure.

The series uses three pieces of theme music, one opening and two ending themes. The opening theme is Alright! HeartCatch PreCure! (Alright!ハートキャッチプリキュア!, Alright! Hātokyatchi Purikyua) by Aya Ikeda. The ending theme for episodes 1–24 is HeartCatch☆Paradise! (ハートキャッチ☆パラダイス!, Hātokyatchi☆Paradaisu!) by Mayu Kudou and the ending theme for episodes 25–49 is "Tomorrow Song ~Ashita no Uta~" (Tomorrow Song ～あしたのうた～, Tomorrow Song ~Ashita no Uta~) by Kudou.

== Episode list ==
No.	Title	Original release date
1	"I Want to Change! I'll Show you That I Can!!"; Transliteration: "Watashi, Kawarimasu! Kawatte Misemasu!!" (Japanese: 私､変わります！変わって見せます!!)	February 7, 2010
Tsubomi Hanasaki has a recurring dream in which a Pretty Cure, Cure Moonlight, is defeated while trying to defend the Tree of Hearts from Professor Sabark and the Dark Pretty Cure. She moves to the town of Kibōgahana and meets Erika Kurumi, a girl from her new school who tries to help her change her image. However, Tsubomi is put off by Erika's outgoing attitude, which causes Erika to be scolded by her older sister Momoka, of whom she is jealous. While walking at the park, Tsubomi encounters Chypre and Coffret, who are being pursued by Sasorina, and Sasorina steals Erika's Heart Flower, which is wilting due to her jealousy towards Momoka, and turns it into a Desertrian. After learning of the dream Tsubomi had about Cure Moonlight, the fairies choose her to become the next Pretty Cure, Cure Blossom, and fight the Desertrian.
2	"Don't tell me I'm History's Weakest Pretty Cure??"; Transliteration: "Watashi tte Shijō Saijaku no Purikyua desu ka??" (Japanese: 私って史上最弱のプリキュアですか??)	February 14, 2010
Unable to control her new powers, Tsubomi fails to save Erika's Heart Flower and the Desertrian nearly kills her until a mysterious man saves her and she loses consciousness. She awakens in her grandmother Kaoruko's botanical garden and learns that she was once a Pretty Cure. After receiving encouragement from Kaoruko, Tsubomi gains the courage to stand up to Sasorina, defeat the Desertrian, and restore Erika's Heart Flower. Tsubomi learns that by defeating the Desertrians, she obtains Heart Seeds, which will allow the withering Tree of Hearts to become healthy again.
3	"The Second Pretty Cure is Full of Energy!"; Transliteration: "Futarime no Purikyua wa Yaruki Manman desu!" (Japanese: 2人目のプリキュアはやる気まんまんです！)	February 21, 2010
Erika reveals that she has been having the same dream of Cure Moonlight as Tsubomi did, so Chypre and Coffret deem her as being qualified to become a Pretty Cure. Erika initially refuses, as she is more concerned with finding more members for the school's fashion club, but later changes her mind and gains the power to become Cure Marine to help Tsubomi defeat the Desertrian of a girl who was denied from joining the school's soccer club.
4	"Is the Pretty Cure Duo Disbanding so Quickly?"; Transliteration: "Hayaku mo Purikyua Konbi Kaisan desu ka?" (Japanese: 早くもプリキュアコンビ解散ですか?)	February 28, 2010
Tsubomi begins to fear that she is a burden to Erika in battle and worries that she will find someone else to replace her. However, she realizes that she is as invaluable a partner to Erika as Erika is to her, and they combine their powers to defeat the Desertrian of a girl facing the same dilemma with her tennis partner.
5	"The Rejected Ramen! Repairing The Father-Son Bonds!"; Transliteration: "Kyohi Sareta Rāmen! Oyako no Kizuna Naoshimasu!" (Japanese: 拒否されたラーメン！親子の絆なおします!)	March 7, 2010
Akira Miura believes that his father, who runs a successful ramen shop, cares more about his business than him. However, he is reluctant to talk about it because he does not want to ruin his father's dream.
6	"Scoop! Pretty Cure's Covers are Blown!?"; Transliteration: "Sukūpu! Purikyua no Shōtai Barechaimasu!?" (Japanese: スクープ！プリキュアの正体ばれちゃいます!?)	March 14, 2010
Kanae Tada, a member of the photography club, tries to investigate the Pretty Cure for her latest scoop. However, she is troubled when she is told that the photos she takes lack true love.
7	"The One I Admire, the Student Council President!!"; Transliteration: "Akogare no Seitokaichō! Otomegokoro wa Kakusemasen!!" (Japanese: あこがれの生徒会長！乙女心はかくせません!!)	March 21, 2010
Tsubomi and Erika appeal to Itsuki Myōdōin, the president of the school's student council, to prevent her from disbanding the fashion club after they fail to recruit more members. Meanwhile, Itsuki tries to come to terms with her desire to be more girly despite being obligated to dress like a boy.
8	"Why is the Charismatic Model sighing?" Transliteration: "Karisuma Moderu no Tameiki! Tte, Naze desu ka?" (Japanese: カリスマモデルのため息！って、なぜですか？)	March 28, 2010
Tsubomi learns that the famous model Momoka is Erika's older sister. While Erika is jealous of Momoka's success as a model, she is unaware that Momoka is jealous of her for being able to make friends until Momoka is turned into a Desertrian.
9	"Father got Scouted! Is This the End for the Flower Shop!?"; Transliteration: "Sukauto Sareta Otōsan! Ohanayasan o Yamechaimasu!?" (Japanese: スカウトされたお父さん！お花屋さんをやめちゃいます!?)	April 4, 2010
Tsubomi's father is visited by his friend Obata, whom he met at the university where he used to do research. Obata asks him to help market new flowers, but Tsubomi's father refuses, so Obata asks Tsubomi to persuade him.
10	"The Biggest Pinch! Dark Pretty Cure Has Appeared!"; Transliteration: "Saidai no Pinchi! Dāku Purikyua ga Arawaremashita!" (Japanese: 最大のピンチ！ダークプリキュアが現れました！)	April 11, 2010
The Desert Apostles send Dark Pretty Cure to attack the Cures.
11	"Acho!! Let's Power Up with Kung Fu!!"; Transliteration: "Achō!! Kanfū de Pawā Appu Shimasu!!" (Japanese: アチョー!!カンフーでパワーアップします!!)	April 18, 2010
After the Cures' battle with the Dark Pretty Cure, Tsubomi blames herself for their defeat and fears that they cannot stand up to her power. Therefore, she and the group decide to train to become more powerful.
12	"Heart Throbbing! Operation Proposal!!"; Transliteration: "Dokkidoki desu! Puropōzu Daisakusen!!" (Japanese: ドッキドキです！プロポーズ大作戦!!)	April 25, 2010
Both Hanasaki Flower Shop and Fairy Drop get customers that want impossible orders in order to impress their true love: Yuto Toshioka wants flowers that will never wilt and Lisa Shibata wants the world's most beloved cloth.
13	"The Truth is Out! Cure Moonlight's Identity!!"; Transliteration: "Shinjitsu ga Akasaremasu! Kyua Mūnraito no Shōtai!!" (Japanese: 真実が明かされます！キュアムーンライトの正体!!)	May 2, 2010
The Agave, a flower seen once every tenth year, is in full bloom. Tsubomi goes to see it and meets Yuri Tsukikage, who she tries to thank her for her help. It is revealed that Yuri is Cure Moonlight.
14	"A Tearful Mother's Day! Protect the Family's Smile!!"; Transliteration: "Namida no Haha no Hi! Kazoku no Egao Mamorimasu!!" (Japanese: 涙の母の日！家族の笑顔守ります!!)	May 9, 2010
Nanami Shiku agrees to help Tsubomi and Erika find presents for their mothers while she struggles with her own problems on Mother's Day.
15	"Unbelievable! The Student Council President in Cute Clothes!!"; Transliteration: "Nanto! Seito Kaichō ga Kyūto na Fuku Kichaimasu!!" (Japanese: なんと！生徒会長がキュートな服着ちゃいます!!)	May 16, 2010
Itsuki wants to join the fashion club, but first she has to accept her dedication for martial arts and her love for cute things.
16	"Erika's the Rival! Written Challenge From the Drama Club!!"; Transliteration: "Raibaru wa Erika! Engekibu kara no Chōsenjō desu!!" (Japanese: ライバルはえりか！演劇部からの挑戦状です!!)	May 23, 2010
A rivalry forms between Erika and Azusa Takagishi, the drama club's costume maker.
17	"Please Acknowledge Us! Our Pretty Cure Spirit!!"; Transliteration: "Mitomete Kudasai! Watashitachi no Purikyua Damashii!!" (Japanese: 認めてくださいっ！私たちのプリキュア魂!!)	May 30, 2010
Tsubomi and Erika go to the greenhouse to see a rare flower bloom and ask for Yuri's help to become stronger.
18	"The Strongest Legend! Pleasure To Meet You, Big Boss!!"; Transliteration: "Saikyō Densetsu! Banchō Tōjō, Yoroshiku desu!!" (Japanese: 最強伝説！番長登場、ヨロシクです!!)	June 6, 2010
Tsubomi and Erika befriend Ban Kenji, who has a reputation as a delinquent leader, but secretly draws shoujo manga about the Cures.
19	"A Tearful Wedding! Father's Day Souvenir Photograph!!"; Transliteration: "Namida no Yomeiri! Chichi no Hi Kinen Shashin desu!!" (Japanese: 涙の嫁入り！父の日記念写真です!!)	June 20, 2010
Erika's family takes Tsubomi and Erika on a trip to a farm where the farmer's daughter is about to get married, but something is troubling her.
20	"The Third Fairy! Potpourri is a Cute Baby!!"; Transliteration: "Daisan no Yōsei! Popuri wa Kawaii Akachan desu!!" (Japanese: 第3の妖精！ポプリはかわいい赤ちゃんです!!)	June 27, 2010
A new fairy, Potpourri, is born, but the Desert Apostles seek it as it tries to protect the Tree of Hearts.
21	"Fairy Adventure! Pretty Cure Scout Plan!"; Transliteration: "Yōsei Adobenchā! Purikyua Sukauto Sakusen desu!" (Japanese: 妖精アドベンチャー！プリキュアスカウト作戦です!)	July 4, 2010
The fairies search for a partner for Potpourri who could become a Pretty Cure.
22	"Finally Found Her!! The Third Pretty Cure!!"; Transliteration: "Tsui ni Mitsukemashita!! Sanninme no Purikyua!!" (Japanese: ついに見つけました!!3人目のプリキュア!!)	July 11, 2010
Aya Mizushima, the president of the gardening club, is inspired by Tsubomi's skills and seeks her advice.
23	"Cure Sunshine is Born!!"; Transliteration: "Kyua Sanshain Tanjō desu!!" (Japanese: キュアサンシャイン誕生です!!)	July 18, 2010
After Satsuki Myoudouin learns of a surgery that could cure him, he is afraid of what might happen afterward. After he is turned into a Desertrian, Itsuki's desire to help her brother leads Potpourri to choose her as his partner, giving her the power to become Cure Sunshine.
24	"Crisis of the Heart Tree! Time to Fly, Pretty Cure!!"; Transliteration: "Kokoro no Taiju no Kiki! Purikyua, Tobimasu!!" (Japanese: こころの大樹の危機！プリキュア、飛びますっ!!)	July 25, 2010
After the Tree of Hearts is threatened, the Cures must save it.
25	"Let's Go To the Beach! Itsuki's Lighthearted Summer Camp!"; Transliteration: "Umi e Gō Desu! Itsuki Ukiuki Natsu Gashuku!" (Japanese: 海へゴーです！いつきウキウキ夏合宿！)	August 1, 2010
The Cures go to a summer camp for a fashion show, and while at camp, Sabaku's three generals attack together.
26	"Have Courage! It's Wonderful to Be My Friend!!"; Transliteration: "Yūki o Dashite! Tomodachi ni Naru tte Suteki nan desu!!" (Japanese: 勇気を出して！友達になるって素敵なんです!!)	August 8, 2010
Naomi Sawai struggles to adjust to Itsuki actually being a girl.
27	"Who is that Handsome Old Man? Cure Flower's First Love!"; Transliteration: "Ojiichan wa Ikemen-san? Kyua Furawā no Hatsukoi desu!" (Japanese: おじいちゃんはイケメンさん？キュアフラワーの初恋です！)	August 15, 2010
The girls go to Kaoruko's hometown, where she reveals how she and Tsubomi's grandfather first met.
28	"Sabaku's Biggest Plan! We Won't Finish Our Summer Homework!!"; Transliteration: "Sabāku Shijō Saidai no Sakusen! Natsuyasumi no Shukudai Owarimasen!!" (Japanese: サバーク史上最大の作戦！夏休みの宿題おわりません!!)	August 22, 2010
A giant Desertrian is created from students worrying about their summer homework.
29	"Summer's Last Legs! My Dress is Finished!!"; Transliteration: "Natsu, Rasuto Supāto! Watashi no Doresu Dekimashita!!" (Japanese: 夏，ラストスパート！私のドレスできました!!)	August 29, 2010
Tsubomi is determined to make a dress that fits her new personality and finds inspiration in Yuki Hayashi, a boy who often rides his bike.
30	"Potpourri Runs Away! Itsuki is Falling Apart!!"; Transliteration: "Popuri ga Iede! Itsuki, Boroboro desu!!" (Japanese: ポプリが家出！いつき、ボロボロです!!)	September 5, 2010
Potpourri runs away after Itsuki scolds him for asking to go to school with her.
31	"Her Sorrowful True Colours! That was Miss Yuri's Fairy..."; Transliteration: "Kanashimi no Shōtai! Sore wa, Yuri-san no Yōsei Deshita..." (Japanese: 悲しみの正体！それは、ゆりさんの妖精でした…)	September 12, 2010
Yuri reveals the truth about her fairy, Cologne, who died protecting her.
32	"Showdown with a Hot Man? That's Not In Our Plans!!"; Transliteration: "Ikemen-san to Taiketsu? Sonna no Kitenai desu!!" (Japanese: イケメンさんと対決？そんなの聞いてないです～!!)	September 19, 2010
The Cures search for the HeartCatch Mirage, an item that Cure Flower used in the past.
33	"Cure Moonlight is Finally Back!!"; Transliteration: "Kyua Mūnraito, Tsui ni Fukatsu desu!!" (Japanese: キュアムーンライト、ついに復活ですっ!!)	September 26, 2010
Yuri regains her Cure powers and ability to transform into Cure Moonlight with help from the Heart Pot.
34	"Amazing Power! Cure Moonlight!!"; Transliteration: "Sugoi Pawā desu! Kyua Mūnraito!!" (Japanese: すごいパワーです！キュアムーンライト!!)	October 3, 2010
The girls fight against the Dark Pretty Cure with help from Cure Moonlight.
35	"Exciting School Fair! Chaotic Fashion Club!!"; Transliteration: "Wakuwaku Gakuensai! Fasshonbu wa Batabata desu!!" (Japanese: ワクワク学園祭！ファッション部はバタバタです!!)	October 10, 2010
As the Cures prepare for the school festival, the film club is struggling with their project.
36	"Everyone is Main Star! Our Stage!!"; Transliteration: "Minna ga Shuyaku! Watashitachi no Sutēji desu!!" (Japanese: みんなが主役！わたしたちのステージです！！)	October 17, 2010
On the day of the school festival, Tsubomi is nervous about modeling in front of everyone. Special guests Aya Ikeda and Mayu Kudou perform at the festival.
37	"We'll Become Strong! The Test is Pretty Cure vs. Pretty Cure!!"; Transliteration: "Tsuyoku Narimasu! Shiren wa Purikyua tai Purikyua!!" (Japanese: 強くなります！試練はプリキュア対プリキュア！！)	October 24, 2010
Dune awakens from his slumber and unleashes the ultimate monster, the Desert Devil, to attack Earth. The Pretty Cure take their final test at the Pretty Cure Palace to prove they are worthy of the power of Super Silhouette.
38	"Pretty Cure transforms into Super Silhouette!!"; Transliteration: "Purikyua, Sūpā Shiruetto ni Henshin desu!!" (Japanese: プリキュア、スーパーシルエットに変身ですっ！！)	October 31, 2010
As Cure Marine, Cure Sunshine, and Cure Moonlight pass their trials, Cure Blossom struggles to complete her trial and accept her past self as the Desert Devil prepares to attack.
39	"Erika is in a Pinch! The Marine Tact Is Stolen!!"; Transliteration: "Erika Pinchi! Marin Takuto ga Ubawaremashita!!" (Japanese: えりかピンチ！マリンタクトが奪われました!!)	November 14, 2010
Coffret gets angry at Erika for misusing her Marine Tact and steals it.
40	"Goodbye Sasorina... A Blossoming Heart Flower, Even in a Desert!!"; Transliteration: "Sayonara Sasorina... Sabaku ni mo Saku Kokoro no Hana desu!" (Japanese: さよならサソリ―ナ… 砂漠にも咲くこころの花です!)	November 21, 2010
During a fight, Sasorina is exposed to purifying energy and becomes good again. Itsuki resigns as president of the student council in order to get stronger.
41	"The Fairies Transformed!? The Pretty Cure Troupe has Begun!!"; Transliteration: "Yōsei ga Henshin!? Purikyua Gekidan Hajimemashita!!" (Japanese: 妖精が変身!? プリキュア劇団はじめました!!)	November 28, 2010
At Nanami's request, the Cures go to Rumi's nursery school to entertain the children when Kumojacky attacks.
42	"A Confused Miss Yuri! We Saw the Love Letter..."; Transliteration: "Tomadoi no Yuri-san! Rabu Retā Michaimashita..." (Japanese: とまどいのゆりさん！ラブレター見ちゃいました…)	December 5, 2010
The girls find a love letter addressed to Yuri.
43	"New Family! I've Become an Older Sister!!"; Transliteration: "Atarashii Kazoku! Watashi, Oneesan ni Narimasu!!" (Japanese: あたらしい家族！私、お姉さんになります!!)	December 12, 2010
Tsubomi learns that her mother is pregnant and the Cures go to the Flower Shop to help her out.
44	"A Christmas Miracle! We Met Cure Flower!"; Transliteration: "Kurisumasu no Kiseki! Kyua Furawā ni Aemashita!" (Japanese: クリスマスの奇跡！キュアフラワーに会えました!)	December 19, 2010
On Christmas, a miracle allows Kaoruko to transform into Cure Flower and fight against a Desertrian.
45	"It's Too Late... The World Has Turned Into a Desert..."; Transliteration: "Mō Dame desu... Sekai ga Sabaku ni Narimashita..." (Japanese: もうダメです…世界が砂漠になりました…)	December 26, 2010
Dune reveals himself and kidnaps Kaoruko, taking her to Dune's castle. He also regains his power from her pendant and turns the world into a desert. Tsubomi and the others go with Coupe to Dune's castle to save Kaoruko.
46	"Kumojacky! Cobraja! We'll Never Forget You!!"; Transliteration: "Kumojakī! Koburāja! Anatatachi o Wasuremasen!!" (Japanese: クモジャキー！コブラージャ！あなたたちを忘れません!!)	January 9, 2011
While trying to save Kaoruko, the Cures fight Kumojacky, Cobraja, and the Dark Pretty Cure.
47	"Please Say It's a Lie! The True Identity of Professor Sabaku!!"; Transliteration: "Uso da to Itte Kudasai! Sabāku Hakase no Shōtai!!" (Japanese: 嘘だと言ってください！サバーク博士の正体!!)	January 16, 2011
While Cure Moonlight fights Dark Pretty Cure, Professor Sabaku attacks her as well. Seeing that her grandmother is safe, Cure Blossom joins the fight but Moonlight wants to fight Dark Pretty Cure on her own. To aid Moonlight in this, Blossom starts fighting Sabaku so he will stop attacking Moonlight. In the battle that ensues Sabaku's mask breaks, revealing him to be Yuri's long lost father while the defeated Dark Pretty Cure is Yuri's non-biological younger sister. Dark Pretty Cure dies in her father's arms.
48	"For the Earth! For Our Dreams! The Final Pretty Cure Transformation!"; Transliteration: "Chikyū no Tame! Yume no Tame! Purikyua Saigo no Henshin desu!" (Japanese: 地球のため！夢のため！プリキュア最後の変身です!)	January 23, 2011
Dark Pretty Cure has been defeated, and Cure Moonlight is finally reunited with her father. However, the happiness doesn't last long, as Dune makes his appearance. After her father is killed by Dune, Moonlight is filled with anger and hatred towards him. She prepares to fight, but Blossom stops her because she would be fighting with hate, and there's no way that they could win with that. So, once again, they transform with love and resume the fight just as Cure Marine and Cure Sunshine arrive and the team attempts to use a Heartcatch Orchestra against him.
49	"All Hearts are One! I am The Strongest Pretty Cure!!"; Transliteration: "Minna no Kokoro o Hitotsu ni! Watashi wa Saikyō no Purikyua!!" (Japanese: みんなの心をひとつに！私は最強のプリキュア!!)	January 30, 2011
Dune withstands the Heartcatch Orchestra and transforms into a planet-sized being to attack the Earth. The universe's love allows the Cures to transform into another giant being, Infinity Silhouette, which allows them to finally purify Dune and allow him to experience love as he disappears. Time passes, showing that Cobraja, Sasorina, and Kumojaki (now as Kumamoto) have new happier lives with no memories of their pasts. The four girls are shown discussing their dreams for the future. Itsuki is shown to have grown out her hair and begun wearing the girls' school uniform. The Heartcatch Orchestra is back in its rightful place and a new Heart Tree is sprouting, protected by the Heart Seeds. Tsubomi's sister Futaba is born and the final shot of the series is a 6-year-old Futaba looking at a photo of the four girls holding a Heart Perfume.

== See also ==
- HeartCatch PreCure! the Movie: Fashion Show in the Flower Capital... Really?! - An animated film based on the series.
- Pretty Cure All Stars DX2: Light of Hope☆Protect the Rainbow Jewel! - The second film in the Pretty Cure All Stars crossover series, starring the HeartCatch Pretty Cures.
