= List of Fresh Pretty Cure! episodes =

- Season 6
- Cover of the final Blu-ray release, featuring the main Cures in their Cure Angel forms and the fairies
- No. of episodes: 50

Release
- Original network: ANN (ABC)
- Original release: February 1, 2009 – January 31, 2010

Series chronology
- ← Previous; Yes! PreCure 5 GoGo! Next → HeartCatch PreCure

Fresh PreCure! is the sixth Pretty Cure anime television series produced by Toei Animation. The series follows Love Momozono, Miki Aono, Inori Yamabuki and Setsuna Higashi, four girls who gain the power to transform into Cure Peach, Cure Berry, Cure Pine, and Cure Passion, respectively, to defend Earth and the parallel worlds from Labyrinth. The series began airing in Japan from February 1, 2009, and January 31, 2010, replacing Yes! Precure 5 GoGo! in its initial timeslot, and was succeeded by HeartCatch PreCure!. It has four pieces of theme music: two opening and two ending themes. The opening theme for episodes the first 25 episodes is "Let's! Fresh Pretty Cure" (Let's!フレッシュプリキュア Rettsu! Furesshu Purikyua?) by Mizuki Moie, and the ending theme is "You make me happy!" by Momoko Hayashi. For episodes 26–50 the opening theme is "Let's! Fresh Pretty Cure! ~Hybrid Version~" (Let's!フレッシュプリキュア~Hybrid.ver~ Rettsu! Furesshu Purikyua ~Hybrid.ver~?) by Mizuki Moie and Momoko Hayashi, and the ending theme is "H@ppy Together" by Momoko Hayashi.

== Episode list ==
| No. | Title | Original air date |
|---|---|---|
| 1 | "Freshly-Picked Fresh! Cure Peach is Born!!"; Transliteration: "Mogitate Furesshu! Kyua Pīchi Tanjō!!" (Japanese: もぎたてフレッシュ！キュアピーチ誕生!!) | February 1, 2009 |
The Elder goes to the Pretty Cure Forest and prays at a temple, causing lightning to strike and four Pickruns to leave for Earth. On Earth, Love goes to the dance unit Trinity event, where a monster called a Nakewameke attacks. As Love tries to protect her idol, Miyuki, Pirun appears and enters her mobile phone, allowing her to transform into Cure Peach and battle the Nakewameke.
| 2 | "Freshly-Gathered Fresh! Cure Berry is Born!!"; Transliteration: "Tsumitate Furesshu! Kyua Berī Tanjō!!" (Japanese: つみたてフレッシュ！キュアベリー誕生!!) | February 8, 2009 |
After the battle, Tart appears before Love and tells her that she is a Pretty Cure and must stop Moebius' ambitions, and that they need to find the other three Pretty Cure. When a vending machine Nakewameke attacks, Birun grants Miki the power to transform into Cure Berry to protect her brother.
| 3 | "Freshly-Harvested Fresh! Cure Pine is Born!!"; Transliteration: "Toretate Furesshu! Kyua Pain Tanjō!!" (Japanese: とれたてフレッシュ！キュアパイン誕生!!) | February 15, 2009 |
Inori has begun to feel left out because she is too shy to dance with Love and Miki. She finds comfort in taking care of Lucky, a little boy's dog. When Lucky is transformed into a Nakewameke, Kirun grants Inori the power to transform into Cure Pine and defeat the Nakewameke.
| 4 | "Chiffon is Lost? The Whole Town's Already in a Big Riot!!"; Transliteration: "Shifon ga Maigo? Machijū Mō Ōsawagi!!" (Japanese: シフォンが迷子？町中もう大騒ぎ!!) | February 22, 2009 |
When Chiffon goes missing and causes chaos in town, the girls must find her.
| 5 | "Heart-Pounding at the Amusement Park! Those Exciting Date Feelings!?"; Transliteration: "Yūenchi de Dokidoki! Wakuwaku Dēto Kibun!?" (Japanese: 遊園地でドキドキ!ワクワクデート気分!?) | March 1, 2009 |
Three boys from Love's school go on a triple date with her and the girls at an amusement park, where Wester turns a panda cart into a Nakewameke to cause chaos.
| 6 | "The Missing Hamburger! Protect Your Favorite Things!!"; Transliteration: "Kieta Hanbāgu! Daisuki na Mono o Mamore!!" (Japanese: 消えたハンバーグ！大好きなものを守れ!!) | March 8, 2009 |
Love buys hamburgers at the store where her mother works, but they disappear because of a Nakewameke Soular summons. After the Nakewameke erases the Cures' mothers, they must defeat it to restore what has been erased.
| 7 | "Setsuna and Love: The Clover of Friendship!"; Transliteration: "Setsuna to Rabu, Yūjō no Kurōbā!" (Japanese: せつなとラブ 友情のクローバー!) | March 15, 2009 |
Setsuna goes to the town centre to meet Love and asks her to give a tour of the town, but secretly plans to steal her Linkrun.
| 8 | "Chiffon in a Pinch! Peach's New Power!!"; Transliteration: "Shifon Dai Pinchi! Pīchi no Atarashii Chikara!!" (Japanese: シフォン大ピンチ！ピーチの新しい力!!) | March 22, 2009 |
After Love accidentally forgets to refill the Cure Vitan, Chiffon's food, she has to find the ingredients to make it. When a Nakewameke attacks, Chiffon's power grants her the Peach Rod.
| 9 | "Miki's Dream, I Want to Quit Being Pretty Cure!!"; Transliteration: "Miki no Yume, Watashi Purikyua Yameru!!" (Japanese: 美希の夢 私プリキュアやめる!!) | March 29, 2009 |
Miki, who aspires to be a model, gets the chance to participate in an audition; if she passes, she will have the chance to be a model overseas. However, she realizes that in order to pursue this dream, she would have to quit dancing and being a Pretty Cure and leave her friends.
| 10 | "Tart is Inori, Inori is Tart!?"; Transliteration: "Taruto ga Inori de Inori ga Taruto!?" (Japanese: タルトが祈里で祈里がタルト!?) | April 5, 2009 |
A Nakewameke Soular summons causes Inori and Tart to switch bodies, forcing Inori to confront her fear of ferrets.
| 11 | "Miyuki's Anger! She Won't Teach Dancing Anymore!?"; Transliteration: "Miyuki no Ikari! Mō Dansu wa Oshienai!?" (Japanese: ミユキの怒り！もうダンスは教えない!?) | April 12, 2009 |
After the Cures are late for a dancing lesson. Miyuki is angry and refuses to teach them anymore.
| 12 | "Let's Transform! The Big Fringy Tactic!!"; Transliteration: "Minna de Henshin! Fusafusa Daisakusen!!" (Japanese: みんなで変身！フサフサ大作戦!!) | April 19, 2009 |
Wester turns one of Love's dad's wigs into a Nakewameke, which gives everyone in Clover Town Street weird hairstyles.
| 13 | "Chiffon is Sick!? Pine's New Power!!"; Transliteration: "Shifon ga Byōki!? Pain no Atarashii Chikara!!" (Japanese: シフォンが病気!?パインの新しい力!!) | April 26, 2009 |
After Chiffon falls ill, Inori is tasked with nursing her back to health. When a Nakewameke attacks, Chiffon's power grants her the Pine Flute.
| 14 | "The Fourth Pretty Cure!? Find the Akarun!!"; Transliteration: "Yoninme no Purikyua!? Akarun o Sagase!!" (Japanese: 4人目のプリキュア!?アカルンを探せ!!) | May 3, 2009 |
Now that Chiffon is able to talk, she tells them that in addition to Pirun, Birun, and Kirun, which give them the ability to transform into Pretty Cure, there is a fourth Pickrun: Akarun, a red Pickrun.
| 15 | "Setsuna and Love: Your Caring Heart!"; Transliteration: "Setsuna to Rabu, Aite o Omoiyaru Kokoro!" (Japanese: せつなとラブ 相手を思いやる心!) | May 10, 2009 |
Love meets with Setsuna again, and Setsuna learns that she trusts her as a friend.
| 16 | "Horrible Culture Festival! Echoing Footsteps in the School at Night!!"; Transliteration: "Kyōfu no Bunkasai! Yoru no Gakkō ni Hibiku Ashioto!!" (Japanese: 恐怖の文化祭！夜の学校に響く足音!!) | May 17, 2009 |
When Love and Daisuke are trapped inside the school during the cultural festival, they must work together to escape a Nakewameke.
| 17 | "Leave Chiffon to Me! Berry's New Power!!"; Transliteration: "Shifon wa Makasete! Berī no Atarashii Chikara!!" (Japanese: シフォンはまかせて！ベリーの新しい力!!) | May 24, 2009 |
Miki is tasked with babysitting Chiffon. When a Nakewameke attacks, Chiffon's power grants her the Berry Sword.
| 18 | "I Want to Meet Pretty Cure! A Little Girl's Wish!!"; Transliteration: "Purikyua ni Aitai! Chiisana Onnanoko no Negai!!" (Japanese: プリキュアに会いたい！小さな女の子の願い!!) | May 31, 2009 |
Love and the girls meet a sick girl in a hospital who wants to meet the Pretty Cure.
| 19 | "The New Card! Eas' New Power!!"; Transliteration: "Aratana Kādo! Īsu no Atarashii Chikara!!" (Japanese: 新たなカード！イースの新しい力!!) | June 7, 2009 |
Moebius, the ruler of Labyrinth, gives Eas cards that can summon a more powerful type of Nakewameke called a Nakisakebe, but also harms her.
| 20 | "Dance and Pretty Cure... Which to Choose?"; Transliteration: "Dansu to Purikyua... Dochira o Erabu?" (Japanese: ダンスとプリキュア...どちらを選ぶ?) | June 14, 2009 |
After exhausting themselves training for a dance competition, the Cures must choose between dancing and their duties as Pretty Cures.
| 21 | "The Fourth Pretty Cure is You!!"; Transliteration: "Yoninme no Purikyua wa Ansan ya!!" (Japanese: 4人目のプリキュアはあんさんや!!) | June 28, 2009 |
The night before the dance competition, the girls are hospitalized due to fatigue and Miyuki soon learns of the Pretty Cure, but refuses to become the fourth Cure.
| 22 | "Setsuna and Love: You're Eas!?"; Transliteration: "Setsuna to Rabu, Anata ga Īsu nano!?" (Japanese: せつなとラブ あなたがイースなの!?) | July 5, 2009 |
After being discharged from the hospital, the girls believe that Miyuki is the fourth Pretty Cure and search for Akarun. However, they run into Eas again, who reveals her identity as Setsuna.
| 23 | "Eas' Last Stand! Cure Passion is Born!!"; Transliteration: "Īsu no Saigo! Kyua Passhon Tanjō!!" (Japanese: イースの最期！キュアパッション誕生!!) | July 12, 2009 |
Eas dies after reaching the end of her assigned lifespan, but Akarun revives her and she becomes the fourth Pretty Cure: Cure Passion.
| 24 | "Setsuna's Distress, I Can't Be Your Friend!"; Transliteration: "Setsuna no Kunō, Watashi wa Nakama ni Narenai!" (Japanese: せつなの苦悩 わたしは仲間になれない!) | July 19, 2009 |
Setsuna, who has become Cure Passion, refuses to join the team and no longer has a place to return to. While walking down the street, she meets Love, who is going to a restaurant with her parents.
| 25 | "Eas vs. Passion!? I am Reborn!!"; Transliteration: "Īsu tai Passhon!? Watashi wa Umarekawaru!!" (Japanese: イース対パッション!?私は生まれ変わる!!) | July 26, 2009 |
Haunted by her actions as Eas, Setsuna must confront them when a Nakewameke doppelganger of Eas attacks.
| 26 | "The Four Hearts! I Also Want to Dance!!"; Transliteration: "Yottsu no Hāto! Watashi mo Odoritai!!" (Japanese: 4つのハート！私も踊りたい!!) | August 2, 2009 |
Setsuna decides that she wants to join Clover, Love, Miki, and Inori's dance group.
| 27 | "The Summer! The Festival! Audrey!!"; Transliteration: "Natsu da! Matsuri da! Ōdorī!!" (Japanese: 夏だ！祭りだ！オードリー!!) | August 9, 2009 |
During the summer festival, the Cures meet the comedy duo Audrey.
| 28 | "Precious Memories! Memories of Grandfather!!"; Transliteration: "Taisetsu na Kioku! Ojiichan to no Omoide!!" (Japanese: 大切な記憶！おじいちゃんとの思い出!!) | August 16, 2009 |
After a Nakewameke attacks and traps Love in her childhood memories, she must choose between staying with her grandfather in the illusion or helping the Cures defeat the Nakewameke.
| 29 | "The Man of Secrets! Kaoru-chan's True Self!?"; Transliteration: "Nazo Darake no Otoko! Kaoru-chan no Shōtai!?" (Japanese: 謎だらけの男！カオルちゃんの正体!?) | August 23, 2009 |
The Cures and Tart realize that Kaoru is hiding something and decide to investigate.
| 30 | "Tart in Danger! His True Self Exposed!?"; Transliteration: "Taruto Kikiippatsu! Shōtai ga Barechau!?" (Japanese: タルト危機一髪！正体がばれちゃう!?) | August 30, 2009 |
After Tart begins to suffer from stomach aches, Ayumi, Love's mother, takes him to Dr. Yamabuki, but is unaware that he is a fairy and risks exposing his true identity.
| 31 | "Love and Daisuke: The Make Up Strategy!"; Transliteration: "Rabu to Daisuke, Nakanaori no Shikata!" (Japanese: ラブと大輔 仲直りのしかた!) | September 6, 2009 |
The new school term has begun, and while Love is happy that Setsuna has become popular at Yotsuba Junior High, Daisuke is not, which causes them to argue.
| 32 | "Good Bye! Tart and Chiffon!!"; Transliteration: "Sayōnara! Taruto to Shifon!!" (Japanese: さようなら！タルトとシフォン!!) | September 13, 2009 |
Tart and Chiffon return to the Sweets Kingdom with the Cures, and they learn that Tart is the prince of the Kingdom and is engaged to a pink ferret named Azukina. The Elder asks Tart to go into the nearby woods to retrieve something, where they are attacked by an evil spirit that Azukina had accidentally released from its seal. As the Cures are overwhelmed by the spirit, Azukina confesses that she was responsible for releasing the spirit and retrieves the Clover Box, and the Cures use its power to defeat the spirit.
| 33 | "What Miki and Setsuna are Afraid Of!"; Transliteration: "Miki to Setsuna no Kowai Mono!" (Japanese: 美希とせつなのこわいもの!) | September 20, 2009 |
When an octopus Nakewameke attacks, Miki struggles to fight it because of her fear of octopuses.
| 34 | "Infinity Arrives! Reclaim Tomorrow!!"; Transliteration: "Infiniti Arawareru! Ashita o Torimodose!!" (Japanese: インフィニティ現れる！明日を取り戻せ!!) | September 27, 2009 |
A calendar Nakewameke causes time to freeze at midnight, preventing tomorrow from coming. While the Cures are able to defeat it, Labyrinth succeeds in filling up the Sorrow Gauge, causing Chiffon to awaken as Infinity.
| 35 | "Chiffon's Hidden Secrets!"; Transliteration: "Shifon no Kakusareta Himitsu!" (Japanese: シフォンの隠された秘密!) | October 4, 2009 |
After Chiffon goes missing after transforming into Infinity, the Cures search for her. When Soular and Wester attack, they are able to use the Clover Box to return her to normal.
| 36 | "A New Enemy! Her Name is Northa!!"; Transliteration: "Aratana Teki! Sono Na wa Nōza!!" (Japanese: 新たな敵！その名はノーザ!!) | October 11, 2009 |
Labyrinth sends a new general, Northa, to attack the Cures with the Sorewatase, a stronger form of Nakewameke.
| 37 | "Protect Chiffon! Pretty Cure's New Power!!"; Transliteration: "Shifon o Mamore! Purikyua no Atarashii Chikara!!" (Japanese: シフォンを守れ！プリキュアの新しい力!!) | October 18, 2009 |
The Cures train with Miyuki to become stronger and Chiffon grants them a new power: the group attack, Lucky Clover Grand Finale.
| 38 | "Find the Clover Box!!"; Transliteration: "Kurōbā Bokkusu o Sagase!!" (Japanese: クローバーボックスを探せ!!) | October 25, 2009 |
After Miki accidentally loses the Clover Box, the Cures must find it before Labyrinth does.
| 39 | "Quarreling is Not Allowed? Okinawa School Trip!!"; Transliteration: "Kenka wa Kinshi? Okinawa Shūgaku Ryokō!!" (Japanese: ケンカは禁止？沖縄修学旅行!!) | November 8, 2009 |
Love, Setsuna, and their classmates go to Okinawa on a research trip.
| 40 | "Setsuna and Love: The Endangered Mother!"; Transliteration: "Setsuna to Rabu, Okaasan ga Abunai!" (Japanese: せつなとラブ お母さんが危ない!) | November 15, 2009 |
Setsuna suspects that something is wrong with Love's mother, Ayumi, and discovers that she has been replaced by a Sorewatase clone.
| 41 | "Inori and Kento's Boat Party!"; Transliteration: "Inori to Kento no Senjō Pātī!" (Japanese: 祈里と健人の船上パーティー!) | November 22, 2009 |
Kento invites Inori to a boat party on a ship.
| 42 | "The Invitation from Labyrinth!"; Transliteration: "Rabirinsu kara no Shōtaijō!" (Japanese: ラビリンスからの招待状!) | November 29, 2009 |
After Northa captures Setsuna, the Cures must rescue her before she is inducted back into Labyrinth.
| 43 | "Save the World! Pretty Cure vs. Labyrinth!!"; Transliteration: "Sekai o Sukue! Purikyua tai Rabirinsu!!" (Japanese: 世界を救え！プリキュア対ラビリンス!!) | December 6, 2009 |
The Cures enter Labyrinth in order to destroy the Sorrow Gauge and fight against Northa.
| 44 | "Suspicious Reedpipe! Chiffon is Stolen!!"; Transliteration: "Ayashiki Kusabue! Ubawareta Shifon!!" (Japanese: 妖しき草笛！奪われたシフォン!!) | December 13, 2009 |
Northa plans to kidnap Chiffon by distracting the Cures.
| 45 | "We are Four Pretty Cures! Separation in Christmas Eve!!"; Transliteration: "Yonin wa Purikyua! Kurisumasu Ibu no Wakare!!" (Japanese: 4人はプリキュア！クリスマスイブの別れ!!) | December 20, 2009 |
As the Cures prepare for the final battle against Labyrinth to rescue Chiffon, they decide to reveal their identities as Pretty Cures to their parents and friends.
| 46 | "Soular and Wester: Battle of the Last Stand!!"; Transliteration: "Saurā to Wesutā, Saigo no Tatakai!!" (Japanese: サウラーとウェスター 最期の戦い!!) | January 3, 2010 |
Moebius sends Soular and Wester to defeat the Cures, and they sacrifice themselves to save Setsuna. Note: This was the first Pretty Cure episode to air in the 2010s.
| 47 | "The World is Changing! The Miracle Donuts!!"; Transliteration: "Sekai ga Kawaru! Dōnatsu ga Okoshita Kiseki!!" (Japanese: 世界が変わる！ドーナツが起こした奇跡!!) | January 10, 2010 |
The Cures fight to free the denizens of Labyrinth.
| 48 | "The Final Battle! Cure Angels Are Born!!"; Transliteration: "Saishū Kessen! Kyua Enjeru Tanjō!!" (Japanese: 最終決戦！キュアエンジェル誕生!!) | January 17, 2010 |
The Cures are seemingly outmatched by Moebius' power until Soular and Wester return to help them along with the people of Labyrinth.
| 49 | "The Surprising Truth! Moebius' True Self!!"; Transliteration: "Odoroki no Shinjitsu! Mebiusu no Hontō no Sugata!!" (Japanese: 驚きの真実！メビウスの本当の姿!!) | January 24, 2010 |
It is revealed that Moebius is actually the AI of a supercomputer who controls Labyrinth and uses a robotic body as a facade. The Cures heads into the heart of the supercomputer to confront him and rescue Chiffon.
| 50 | "Full of Smiles! Everyone Will Get Their Happiness!!"; Transliteration: "Egao ga Ippai! Minna de Shiawase Getto da yo!!" (Japanese: 笑顔がいっぱい！みんなで幸せゲットだよ!!) | January 31, 2010 |
Having gained the power of their Cure Angel forms, the Cures face the final battle against Moebius, who attempts to use Chiffon to destroy Labyrinth in a last-ditch effort to defeat them. However, they rescue Chiffon and escape the supercomputer before it explodes. With the people of Labyrinth freed, the Cures return home and look to the future and the happiness that awaits them.

== See also ==
- Fresh PreCure! the Movie: The Toy Kingdom has Lots of Secrets!? - An animated film based on the series.
- Pretty Cure All Stars DX: Everyone's Friends☆the Collection of Miracles! - The first film in the Pretty Cure All Stars crossover series, which stars the Fresh Pretty Cure.
