= List of Yes! PreCure 5 GoGo! episodes =

- Season 5
- Cover of the first DVD release featuring the main Cures
- No. of episodes: 48

Release
- Original network: ANN (ABC)
- Original release: February 3, 2008 – January 25, 2009

Series chronology
- ← Previous; Yes! PreCure 5 Next → Fresh Pretty Cure!

Yes! PreCure 5 GoGo! is the fifth Pretty Cure anime television series produced by Toei Animation. It serves as a sequel to the previous series, in which the girls are granted new powers to save the Four Rulers of the kingdoms surrounding the Palmier Kingdom and protect Flora and the Cure Rose Garden from the evil organization Eternal. The series aired in Japan from February 3, 2008, to January 25, 2009, replacing Yes! PreCure 5 in its timeslot and was succeeded by Fresh Pretty Cure!. The series uses three pieces of theme music, one opening and two ending themes. The opening theme is "Pretty Cure 5, Full Throttle Go Go!" (プリキュア5、フル·スロットルGO GO! Purikyua Faibu, Furu Surottoru Gō Gō!), performed by Kudou. From episode 1-29, the first ending theme is "Te to Te Tsunaide Heart mo Link!!" (手と手つないでハートもリンク!! Te to Te Tsunaide Hāto mo Rinku!!, "From Hand to Hand, the Heart also Links!!") performed by Miyamoto with Young Fresh. The second ending "Ganbalance de Dance ~Kibō no Relay~" (ガンバランス de ダンス～希望のリレー～ Ganbalance de Dance ~Kibō no Rirē~, "Ganbalance de Dance ~Relay of Hope~) was used for episodes 30-48 of the series, and performed by the Cure Quartet, comprising Gojo, Uchiyae, Kudou, and Miyamoto. Two insert songs were also used in the series, the first being "Twin Tail no Mahō" (ツイン・テールの魔法 Tsuin Tēru no Mahō?, "Magic of the Pigtails") by Ise as Urara Kasugano in episode 18, and the other "Ashita, Hana Saku. Egao, Saku." (明日、花咲く。笑顔、咲く。"Tomorrow the Flower Blooms. The Smile Blooms.") by the Cure Quartet, sung right before the ending theme played on episode 48.

== Episode list ==
No.	Title	Original air date
1	"Return! Pretty Cure 5!"; Transliteration: "Fukkatsu! Purikyua Faibu!" (Japanese: 復活！プリキュア5！)	February 3, 2008
After defeating Despariah, life has returned to normal for Nozomi, Rin, Urara, Komachi and Karen. One day, a mysterious boy named Shiro Amai (Syrup), who claims to be a delivery boy, delivers a mysterious letter to Nozomi at school. Nozomi and the others open the letter and a hologram of a woman named Flora appears, requesting their presence at a place known as the Cure Rose Garden. When Scorp of Eternal attacks, the Rose Pact grants them new power and allows them to transform into Pretty Cure once more.
2	"Nozomi and Coco: A Distressing Reunion"; Transliteration: "Nozomi to Koko Nayameru Saikai" (Japanese: のぞみとココ 悩める再会)	February 10, 2008
With the girls having regained their powers as Pretty Cure, Nuts and Coco return to Earth to find the Four Rulers, and Nozomi is happy to see Coco. However, Coco does not seem to share this feeling, and she is upset that he is acting cold and distant.
3	"Delivery Boy Syrup's Friend"; Transliteration: "Hakobiya Shiroppu no Tomodachi" (Japanese: 運び屋シロップの友達)	February 17, 2008
Milk has Syrup deliver letters about Palmier Kingdom to Coco, but he becomes overwhelmed and refuses to deliver any more. After noticing this, his mailbox-shaped friend Mailpo steps in to help.
4	"Deliver Urara's Script!"; Transliteration: "Urara no Daihon o Todokero!" (Japanese: うららの台本を届けろ!)	February 24, 2008
After Urara forgets her script at the Nuts House, Nozomi, Rin, Komachi, and Karen attempt to deliver it to her, but Eternal interferes.
5	"The Letter to Student Council President Karen"; Transliteration: "Seitokaichō Karen he no Tegami" (Japanese: 生徒会長かれんへの手紙)	March 2, 2008
Karen sets up a suggestion box for the students, through which she receives a letter that confuses her.
6	"King Donuts Awakens!"; Transliteration: "Dōnatsu Kokuō Mezameru!" (Japanese: ドーナツ国王目覚める!)	March 9, 2008
As the Cures prepare to open the new Nuts House, they worry about Rin overworking herself as King Donuts awakens.
7	"Let's Go! Palmier Kingdom!"; Transliteration: "Rettsugō! Parumie Ōkoku!" (Japanese: レッツゴー！パルミエ王国！)	March 16, 2008
Milk contacts Nozomi with a call for help and they travel to Palmier Kingdom, where they learn that she was actually lonely, but decide to enjoy their visit anyway. When Nebakatos, an agent of Eternal, attacks, after the battle Milk discovers a mysterious blue seed that appeared from the Rose Pact.
8	"Syrup and the Mysterious Letter"; Transliteration: "Shiroppu to Nazo no Tegami" (Japanese: シロップと謎の手紙)	March 23, 2008
After Syrup and the Cures receive a letter written in pictures, they attempt to decipher it. It is revealed that Syrup once worked for Eternal, as they promised to take him to the Cure Rose Garden if he retrieved the Rose Pact for them.
9	"Detective Komachi Appears!"; Transliteration: "Meitantei Komachi Tōjō!" (Japanese: 名探偵こまち登場!)	March 30, 2008
Karen brings a cake to celebrate the reopening of the Nuts House, and decides to investigate after it disappears.
10	"Appear! The Power of the Blue Rose!"; Transliteration: "Deta! Aoi Bara no Chikara!" (Japanese: 出た!青いバラの力!)	April 6, 2008
One day, the Rose Pact shines and Flora appears before the Cures. She informs them of a prophecy stating that they must "Combine the power of the red and blue rose" and predicts that they will be in danger when something with anger and hate appears. When Scorp and Bunbee both attack, a mysterious warrior who calls herself Milky Rose appears to aid them.
11	"Elegant Transformation! Milky Rose!"; Transliteration: "Karei ni Henshin! Mirukī Rōzu!" (Japanese: 華麗に変身！ミルキィローズ！)	April 13, 2008
After the fight, the Cures wonder who Milky Rose is and if she is their partner. Syrup suspects that she may be a member of Eternal. When Scorp is given one last chance to defeat the Cures and take the Rose Pact, he emerges from the lake near Nuts House and attacks them. Milky Rose reappears to aid them and kills him before leaving.
12	"Kurumi Mimino has Arrived!"; Transliteration: "Mimino Kurumi ga Yattekita!" (Japanese: 美々野くるみがやってきた！)	April 20, 2008
Kurumi Mimino transfers to Cinq Lumiere, and Nozomi and Rin, whom Coco asks to show her around the school, recognize her as Milky Rose and are surprised that she already knows who the Cures are. In Eternal, Anacordy hires Nebatakos to replace Scorp.
13	"Fairy Tale World of Nightmares!"; Transliteration: "Akumu no Meruhen Wārudo!" (Japanese: 悪夢のメルヘンワールド！)	April 27, 2008
Syrup has been having dreams of the Cure Rose Garden and wants to go there, but is worried that he cannot. Later, Shibiretta, an agent of Eternal, attacks and sends him, Coco, and Nozomi into the story of Pinocchio.
14	"Milky Rose's Secret!"; Transliteration: "Mirukī Rōzu no Himitsu!" (Japanese: ミルキィローズの秘密！)	May 4, 2008
The group is suspicious of Kurumi and the fact that Milk has not been sending them letters and attempt to uncover her true identity.
15	"Rin and the Bean Tree"; Transliteration: "Rin-chan to Mame no Ki" (Japanese: りんちゃんと豆の木)	May 11, 2008
Rin scolds Nozomi for not listening, but she does not take the warning seriously. They later attempt to catch a Palmin, but Shibiretta sends them into the story of Jack and the Beanstalk and they fall into a trap.
16	"Karen and Komachi's Candy House"; Transliteration: "Karen to Komachi no Okashi no Ie" (Japanese: かれんとこまちのお菓子の家)	May 18, 2008
While they are at the library, Shibiretta sends Nozomi, Karen and Komachi into the story of Hansel and Gretel.
17	"Mr. Tamuken's Treasure"; Transliteration: "Tamuken-san no Takaramono" (Japanese: たむけんさんの宝物)	May 25, 2008
Nozomi decides to help the comedian Tamuken after seeing him put up flyers in search of a partner.
18	"Send It To Everyone! Urara's Singing Voice"; Transliteration: "Minna ni Todoke! Urara no Utagoe" (Japanese: みんなに届け！うららの歌声)	June 1, 2008
While searching for a Palmin, Syrup becomes concerned at Urara's sadness and attempts to help her.
19	"Fisherman Karen and Turtle Milk!?"; Transliteration: "Urashima Karen to Kame Miruku!?" (Japanese: 浦島かれんと亀ミルク!?)	June 8, 2008
As Karen is trying to send a letter to her parents, Shibiretta sends her and Milk into the story of Urashima Tarō.
20	"Komachi and Madoka, the Two's Dreams"; Transliteration: "Komachi to Madoka Futari no Yume" (Japanese: こまちとまどか 二人の夢)	June 22, 2008
Komachi's sister Madoka visits her as she is showing her new novel draft to Nuts before going to the university. As she left her bag at the Nuts House, Komachi goes to the university to return it to her.
21	"Full of Friendship, Making Lunch Together!"; Transliteration: "Yūjōtappuri Minna de Obentō!" (Japanese: 友情たっぷりみんなでお弁当!)	June 29, 2008
As Nozomi's parents are busy working, she tries to make her own lunch with help from the Cures.
22	"Teacher Nozomi Does Her Very Best!"; Transliteration: "Nozomi-sensei Ōini Ganbaru!" (Japanese: のぞみ先生大いに頑張る!)	July 6, 2008
Rin asks Coco to teach her siblings and help them with their studies, and Nozomi volunteers to teach them, but has trouble answering the children's questions.
23	"Syrup is Betraying Us!?"; Transliteration: "Shiroppu ga Uragitta!?" (Japanese: シロップが裏切った!?)	July 13, 2008
Anacondy appears before Syrup and proposes that if he wants to know his past, he can give them the Rose Pact. Syrup decides to go to Eternal alone to get his memories back, but hesitates to give them the Rose Pact. Nozomi and the others go to Eternal to help him.
24	"The New Power of Pretty Cure 5!"; Transliteration: "Purikyua Faibu Aratana Chikara!" (Japanese: プリキュア5新たな力!)	July 20, 2008
The Cures arrive at Eternal to help Syrup, but he runs away, feeling that he has betrayed them, but Coco convinces him to help them. When Nebatakos attacks the Cures, Coco awakens the power of the Palmier Crown, granting the Cures the Cure Fleurets and allowing them to defeat Nebatakos.
25	"Summer Nightmare With Two"; Transliteration: "Manatsu no Akumu no Futarigumi" (Japanese: 真夏の悪夢の二人組)	July 27, 2008
Syrup temporarily moves into the Nuts House and works as a postman. When the Cures go shopping, Yadokhan and Isohgin, two agents of Eternal, attack.
26	"Pretty Cure in the Big City!"; Transliteration: "Purikyua Daitokai ni Arawaru!" (Japanese: プリキュア大都会に現る!)	August 3, 2008
After Urara takes a job as a live reporter for a parade, Nozomi and the others go with her to the metropolis. There, Bunbee appears and demands the Rose Pact, threatening to steal the city's treasure if they do not.
27	"Rin Vs The Monsters of Edo!"; Transliteration: "Rin-chan tai Ōedo Yōkai!" (Japanese: りんちゃんVS大江戸妖怪!)	August 17, 2008
As the Cures are enjoying the summer festival, Shibiretta transports them to the Edo period, where they are separated and attacked by yōkai.
28	"Coco's Bride has Arrived!?"; Transliteration: "Koko no Oyome-san Tōjō!?" (Japanese: ココのお嫁さん登場!?)	August 24, 2008
Princess Crepe is found and introduces herself as Coco's fiancee, which Nozomi and Milk are surprised by.
29	"A Cool Guy and Tennis!?"; Transliteration: "Kōgen de Ikemen to Tenisu!?" (Japanese: 高原でイケメンとテニス!?)	August 31, 2008
Nozomi and the others go to Karen's villa to play tennis. Anacondy tasks Mucardia with obtaining the Rose Pact, and he disguises himself as a young man to approach Nozomi's group.
30	"The Power of the King and Nuts' Worries"; Transliteration: "Ō no Chikara to Nattsu no Nayami" (Japanese: 王の力とナッツの悩み)	September 7, 2008
Nozomi and the others go to the Nuts House to see the harvest moon, where Shibiretta sends them into the story of The Tale of the Bamboo Cutter.
31	"Milky Rose's New Power!"; Transliteration: "Miruki Rōzu Aratanaru Chikara!" (Japanese: ミルキィローズ新たなる力!)	September 14, 2008
Nuts is troubled and feels that he cannot help the group. When Anacondy attacks, he grants Milky Rose the power of the Palmier Crown, which allows her to defeat Anacondy.
32	"Small Small Big Adventure!"; Transliteration: "Chiisana Chiisana Daibouken!" (Japanese: 小さな小さな大冒険!)	September 21, 2008
Mucardia disguises himself as a magician and visits the Nuts House. After opening a box that resembles the Rose Pact, the Cures are shrunk and must find a way to return to normal size.
33	"Hustling Urara and The Curry Shop"; Transliteration: "Hassuru Urara to Karē Yasan" (Japanese: ハッスルうららとカレー屋さん)	September 28, 2008
Urara goes to her classmate's curry shop, Yoshimi's Curry Shop, to help her hand out flyers.
34	"Tears of Loneliness! Crepe's Confession"; Transliteration: "Namida no Owakare! Kurēpu no Kokuhaku" (Japanese: 涙のお別れ！クレープの告白)	October 5, 2008
Crepe sneaks into Coco's bag to go to school and see his work before she returns to her kingdom, while planning to confess her love for him.
35	"Bunbee's Shocking Proposal!"; Transliteration: "Bunbī Shougeki Hatsugen!" (Japanese: ブンビー衝撃発言!)	October 12, 2008
Nozomi is bored because the others are busy and visit the Nuts House less often. Meanwhile, Bunbee is depressed about being neglected by Anacondy. Nozomi and Bunbee go to the park at the same time, where he tries to find out why she is upset. Later, he visits the Cures and proposes that he become their leader.
36	"Watch Out! Five DE Chance! (Part 1)"; Transliteration: "Abunai! Faibu DE Chansu! (Zenpen)" (Japanese: 危ない！ファイブDEチャンス！（前編）)	October 19, 2008
At the Nuts House, Karen learns that they want to participate in a game show. She is invited, but refuses because she hates gambling. On the day of the game show, she receives a call from Komachi saying that Kurumi cannot participate because she is too nervous. She substitutes for Kurumi, but things are not as they seem, as Mucardia has disguised himself as a game show host to capture them.
37	"Watch Out! Five DE Chance! (Part 2)"; Transliteration: "Abunai! Faibu DE Chansu! (Kōhen)" (Japanese: 危ない！ファイブDEチャンス！（後編）)	October 26, 2008
Mucardia tells the Cures that they can return to the real world if they win, but he rigs the games so that they lose. After the others are defeated, Karen is the only one left to challenge Mucardia in a coin toss.
38	"Our Two Powers! Dream and Rose!!"; Transliteration: "Futari no Chikara! Dorīmu ando Rōzu!!" (Japanese: 二人の力！ドリーム&ローズ!!)	November 9, 2008
As the Cure Rose Garden begins to wilt, Rin says that blue roses are rare and a symbol of miracles, while Syrup mentions that he saw blue roses blooming in the Cure Rose Garden. They learn that there is only one blue rose left in the world: the one in the Garden. When Yadokhan and Isohgin attack the Cures, Dream and Rose combine their powers to defeat them.
39	"Save King Montblanc!"; Transliteration: "Monburan Kokuō o Sukue!" (Japanese: モンブラン国王を救え!)	November 16, 2008
After Karen discovers King Montblanc, the last of the Four Rulers, she must care for him after he falls ill.
40	"Return Urara's Singing Voice!"; Transliteration: "Urara no Utagoe o Torimodose!" (Japanese: うららの歌声を取り戻せ!)	November 23, 2008
Urara is aiming to be the lead of a musical performance when Shibiretta transports the Cures into the story of The Little Mermaid.
41	"Rin has Date With a Gentleman!?"; Transliteration: "Rin-chan Ikemen to Dēto!?" (Japanese: りんちゃんイケメンとデート!?)	November 30, 2008
Rin struggles with artist's block while designing accessories. Mucardia, disguised as a boy named Kyosuke, comes by, and they are later seen walking together as if on a date.
42	"Komachi's Choice and the Arabian Nights"; Transliteration: "Komachi no Ketsui to Arabian Naito" (Japanese: こまちの決意とアラビアンナイト)	December 7, 2008
Nozomi and the others go to the library to help Nuts find a book, where she sees Komachi deep in thought in front of a bookshelf. Shibiretta later appears and transports them into the story of the Arabian Nights, specifically "Ali-Baba and the 40 Thieves."
43	"Horrifying! Eternal's boss!" Transliteration: "Kyōfu! Etānaru no Kanchou!" (Japanese: 恐怖！エターナルの館長!)	December 14, 2008
Nozomi is studying in the school library, and while heading home with Coco, the boss of Eternal steals the Rose Pact and attacks them.
44	"Open! Everyone's Present!"; Transliteration: "Todoke! Minna no Purezento!" (Japanese: 届け！みんなのプレゼント！)	December 21, 2008
The group is decorating the Nuts House for Christmas, and after Mailpo gives them a list of presents children want, they decide to help deliver them. On the way, Syrup and Urara meet an old man who has lost his sleigh.
45	"The Cure Rose Garden's Gate Appears!"; Transliteration: "Kyua Rōzu Gāden no Tobira Arawaru!" (Japanese: キュアローズガーデンの扉現る!)	January 4, 2009
King Montblanc has recovered, and Syrup gather the other three Rulers to open the gate to the Cure Rose Garden. While Nozomi and the others are happy to go there, Syrup is worried.
46	"Unforgiving! Pretty Cure 5 Confiscated!"; Transliteration: "Zettai Zetsumei! Bosshūsareta Purikyua Faibu!" (Japanese: 絶体絶命！没収されたプリキュア5！)	January 11, 2009
As Syrup regains his memories, the Boss orders Anacondy to attack the Cures and capture them for his collection. She petrifies them, but then is killed, as she is no longer of use. With the Cures unable to stop him, the Boss begins heading for the Cure Rose Garden.
47	"Our Feelings As One! Miracle of the Blue Rose!!"; Transliteration: "Kimochi o Hitotsu ni! Aoi Bara no Kiseki!!" (Japanese: 気持ちをひとつに！青いバラの奇跡!!)	January 18, 2009
Milk and Syrup go to Eternal to save the Cures as the Boss meets Flora.
48	"To the Future! Forever Strong Pretty Cure 5!"; Transliteration: "Mirai e! Eien Fumetsu no Purikyua Faibu!" (Japanese: 未来へ！永遠不滅のプリキュア5!)	January 25, 2009
The Boss attacks the Cure Rose Garden, and despite their efforts, the Cures are defeated. Mailpo appears and delivers letters from all over the world, giving them the power to defeat the Boss. Afterwards, Flora entrusts Nozomi with the duty of guarding the Cure Rose Garden before dying. She is reborn as a seed, which the Cures decide to plant and care for.

== See also ==
- Yes! Precure 5 GoGo! the Movie: Happy Birthday in the Sweets Kingdom - An animated film based on the series.
