= List of Danball Senki episodes =

This is a list of episodes from the anime Danball Senki, its sequel series Little Battlers eXperience W, and the final chapter in Little Battlers eXperience Wars. It also contains the list of Danball Senki dubbed episodes, LBX: Little Battlers Experience, which is listed separately due to the number of edits, episode deletions, and episode merges (44 to 26).

== Japanese ==
=== Little Battlers eXperience (2011–12) ===
Opening themes

- "1 Dream!!" by Little Blue boX (eps. 1–25)
- "Ishin Denshin (以心伝心)" by Little Blue boX (eps. 25–43)

Ending themes

- "Boku no Chokinbako" (僕の貯金箱) by Hiroki Maekawa (eps. 1–24)
- "Himitsu Kichi" (ヒミツキチ) by Hiroki Maekawa (eps. 25–44)

No.	Title	Original release date
1	"Meeting With a Small Machine"; Transliteration: "Chiisa na Mashin to no Deai" (Japanese: 小さなマシンとの出会い)	March 2, 2011
The year is 2050, and little fighting robots known as LBX are all the craze. A tournament known as Artemis is held to determine whom the best fighter is. This year Yamano Ban, Aoshima Kazuya, and Kawamura Ami are in the tournament with their LBX's. After the trio pulls off a shocking victory in the first round Ban thinks back to how he met his robot earlier that year. Ban has loved LBX's all his life. His father created them and early on showed Ban how to love and care for them. However his father went missing 8 years earlier when Plane PA027 went missing on its way to the Neo Technology Summit. No wreckage was ever found, but Ban's mom has not allowed him to play with an LBX since then at home. It all changes when a mysterious lady breaks out of the Innovator base and finds Ban, She gives him a case that he takes home. When Ban opens the case at home he finds a LBX inside. Before he can activate it a laser scans him. Outside 3 Innovator spies reveal this LBX has a Death Lock inside it and if an uncertified user picks it up it will kill that person with a poisonous dart. Ban ends up being the certified user, so the three spies attack him with their Dequoo LBX's. Ban is chased behind the couch by a Dequoo with a gun, and the other two attempt to chop up his LBX until he gets it activated. Once activated Ban is able to dispose of the three Dequoo's, but it leaves the entertainment room in shambles. His mom arrives home and says it is ok for him to keep the LBX, but first he needs to clean the room up. She then goes outside and thinks to herself that something big is about to happen.
2	"The Lost Achilles"; Transliteration: "Ubawareta Akiresu" (Japanese: 奪われたアキレス)	March 9, 2011
Ban takes the AX-00 to the Kitajima Model Shop where he meets with Ami. He tells Kitijama, Saki, and Ami the story of how he got the LBX. At the Innovators base Yagami finds out why the Professor sent Ban the LBX. He learns AX-00 is protecting an item known as the Platinum Capsule. If anyone other than Ban were to try and grab AX-00, not only would they die from the poisonous dart, but the death lock system would also self destruct and destroy the Platinum Capsule. The only way to regain this would be by defeating AX-00 in a LBX battle. Over at Tiny Orbit the board asks the director Uzaki Yuusuke why he built the unauthorized Achilles form. He reveals the specs and points out that this design is more advanced than anything they've ever had before, and it will make them millions. He goes back to his office where he receives another blueprint for a LBX to be called Hunter. He signs his name J. Back at Kitajima's Kitajima decides to give Ban the Achilles armor, but he is disappointed to learn that Saki has sold it, until he learns the cash card is fake. If Ban can find Gouda Honza and defeat him he can use the Achilles armor for free. Ban heads to school with Ami and shows Kazu his new LBX. He then asks Kazu if he knows anything about Gouda. Kazu reveals Gouda uses a LBX known as the Destruction God of Hell and he is one of the Four Devas. Kazu refuses to tell them where Gouda is and leaves before ban can pressure him into giving up more details. After school Ban and Ami recruit the help of Ryuu and go looking for Gouda's base. Mika ends up telling them where it is. Once they arrive at the base Ban, Amy, and Ryuu meet the other three Divas and their LBX's- Riko with Queen, Tetsuo with Nazu, and Ginji with Mad Dog. The trio refuse to give up Gouda's location unless these 3 can beat them in a LBX battle. When AX-00 begins predicting his opponents moves Ban gains a slight advantage. That advantage quickly fails with Ryuu's Buld is destroyed by Queen's gun fire and rockets. Ryuu withdraws, and just before AX-00 is destroyed Kazu makes the save with Warrior. With Kazu's added strength Ban is able to destroy the three LBX's, with an assist from a magnetic charge by Warrior. After repairing their LBX's the three enter a nearby door and meet Gouda face-to-face.
3	"Descend God Destruction of Hell"; Transliteration: "Kourin Jigoku no Hakaishin" (Japanese: 降臨 地獄の破壊神！)	March 16, 2011
Gouda returns the Achilles frame to Ban and reveals he was told to take it to keep it out of the hands of dangerous organizations on unsmart kids. He then challenges Ban, Kazu, and Ami to a 3-on-1 battle against his Hakai-O, AKA the Destruction God of Hell. Kunoichi is customized for speed while Warrior and Achilles are customized for short distance shooting. The three also come up with a strategy to take down Hakai-O using hit-and-run tactics. The plan backfires on them when Hakai-O uses his Gaou Cannon to create a smokescreen. Hakai-O then moves in on Warrior and crushes him. The second time Hakai-O uses his Gaou cannon Kazu realizes that Hakai-O temporarily goes offline because of the amount of power that it uses. After the third attack he tells Ban and Ami the news, and on the fourth attack Ban is able to grab Warrior's gun and take out the Gaou Cannon before moving in and knocking him out of commission. Gouda keeps his word and lets them keep the Achilles frame. At the Innovators headquarters Yagami is on the phone and tells them not to worry about Achilles being completed. He has come up with a plan to destroy Achilles in a LBX battle, and he creates a new dangerous LBX to do the dirty work.
4	"The Cursed Golden Knight"; Transliteration: "Norowareta Ōgon no Kishi" (Japanese: 呪われた黄金の騎士)	March 16, 2011
The episode begins at the Blue Cat coffee shop where two men are discussing Ban and Achilles. These men seem to want to use Achilles for a secret mission, but they do not know if Ban will be ready yet. Ban rushes to school after being unable to get sleep the night before. Him and Ami agree to battle at Kitajima's after school, but first they want to check on Kazu and see if he has gotten over his LBX being destroyed. Ryu ends up claiming he is the one who defeated Gouda and gets hero worship from all the kids, but his speech backfires on him and forces him to hide after school when they ask him to defeat Gouda and get their LBX's back from them. Over at the Innovators base Yagami has finished construction on a new LBX that he believes will win him the Platinum Capsule. He dispatches a task force to make sure it can target Achilles. Ban and Ami head to Kitajima's and find Kazu is not there. Kazu is at a nearby mall reading the newest LBX magazine and wishing he had enough allowance to buy a new LBX. A man in a dark alleyway offers to sale him a LBX real cheap and presents to him Egypt. Egypt hypnotizes Kazu and tells him to destroy Achilles. Kazu leaves the shop table, and the man selling the LBX's is revealed to be one of the Innovator agents. Kazu finds Ban and Ami after Ban has left Kitajima's and challenges him to a battle. Kazu throws out a D-cube and Egypt. the D-cube brings up a desert setting. The Innovators agents watch the match from across the river while one of the men from Blue Cat's watches from the roadway. They see Achilles is slow to move in the sand, giving Egypt a huge advantage, but before Egypt can destroy Achilles a special mode, V-Mode is activated. The one thing Ban does not like- when Achilles is in V Mode he cannot control him. Achilles destroys Egypt and breaks Kazu out of the hypnosis. The agents retreat while the man marvels that Achilles has such a special mode on hand. Afterwards the trio return to Kitajima's where Kitajima has customized a Gladiator for Kazu to use until Kazu can buy a new LBX.
5	"The Dark Assassin"; Transliteration: "Yami no Ansatsusha" (Japanese: 闇の暗殺者)	March 23, 2011
Dr. Kaidō hopes to eliminate the prime minister Zaizen Sousuke. In order to do so he hires a professional hit man and creates a new LBX known as Assassin for him to use. The hit man shows he has incredible aim in an exhibition and proves he can take a target out from a long distance. Over at Blue Cats coffee Hizami learns of the assassination attempt. He is given a letter that says use the kids with the white LBX to prevent the attack. He is also given a new LBX to help in the mission. Hizami sends Uzaki Takuya to get Ban, Ami, and Kazu from Kitajima's. He takes them back to Blue Cat's where they show the kids the new LBX Hunter and praise Achilles maintenance. Takuya then reveals he did not get them just to show them the new LBX. Instead he hopes they'll help prevent the assassination. If they agree Kazu will be given Hunter at no charge. The kids agree and head home to practice. Kazu focuses specifically on his long range shooting, but despite calibrating the gun and doing some maintenance to Hunter he cannot seem to hit the bullseye. The next day Kazu thinks of pulling out until Ban gives a speech reminding him how LBX's should be fun but that they an lose them all if this attack succeeds. Kazu agrees to go if he can practice some more first, but when they enter Blue Cat's Hizami receives a call saying Zaizen Sousuke's induction parade has been moved up. If they do not leave now there will be no way to stop the attack. The group reluctantly leaves wishing only that they had more time.
6	"Showdown: Sniper vs. Sniper"; Transliteration: "Taiketsu Sogekishu VS Sogekishu" (Japanese: 対決 狙撃手VS狙撃手)	April 6, 2011
The group arrives at the route where Prime Minister Zaizen's parade will take place. Kazu spends a few minutes recalibrating Hunter's sniping gun while Ban and Ami investigate the beginning and middle of the route. Ban learns there is a glass building at the middle of the route, and Ami and Kazu are dispatched to his location. Kazu uses Hunter to scan the building on the other side of the glass, and they find what appears to be Assassin. The three infiltrate the building and run into the 3 Dequoo's that tried to kidnap Achilles in episode 1. Achilles and Kunoichi distract the Buld's while Kazu and Hunter run up the building and take out Assassin. Only when they arrive they find out Assassin is a dummy. After destroying the Dequoo's Ami and Ban go up, and Ban sees another building nearby with a helipad on it. Once again Kazu uses Hunter's sites to zoom in, and once again Assassin is present. In order for Ban and Ami to make it to the building in time Kazu must use Hunter's high aiming specs to distract Assassin. Kazu gets off three shots, two of which cause smoke and hit Assassin. Assassin retaliates by trying to take out Hunter, but Kazu is able to get him to safety. Amy and Ban make it to the building in time and use their speed to take out Assassin. With Assassin down the professional hit man activates Assassin's self destruct and leaves from another nearby building. As Ami, Ban, and Kazu reunite with Takuya Ban asks Takuya why it had to be them that did this mission. Seeing no other choice Takuya decides to reveal the shocking truth that Ban's father is still alive.
7	"My Name is "Innovator""; Transliteration: "Sono Na wa Inobētā" (Japanese: その名はイノベーター)	April 13, 2011
Takuya takes the kids back to Blue Cats where he reveals that the entire plane, except Professor Yamano, agreed to go with the Innovators 5 years earlier. Their goal was to create an endless supply of energy known as the Eternal Cycler. However Professor Yamano realized it could be used as a weapon and decided to hide the plans inside the Platinum Capsule. Ban asks Takuya and Hizami if they know where his father is being held at, and they say no. Ban and Kazu return home, but Ami stays behind to do a little snooping. Meanwhile Yagamai asks Doctor Kaidō if he was responsible for the Assassin incident since Assassin was made from their specs. With Kunoichi's recording mode she finds out Professor Yamano is being held at a place called Angel Star. Ryuu explains that Angel Star is owned by Kamiya Craft and that it is the largest weapon manufacture in Japan. He also tells them they have been investigated for making secret weapons, though he believes they are innocent. Ban, Kazu, and Ami decide to investigate the building anyway. At Angel Star we are introduced to Heiji Kirishima. Kirishima originally created the boxes that house the LBX battles, but he later lost the licensing right to Tiny Orbit. As a result he now works overtime almost daily for Kamiya Craft hoping to restart his business. Ban uses Achilles to hold the door open at Angel Star, and Ban, Ami, and Kazu enter the building. The cameras quickly catch them, and a squadron of Dequoo R LBX's are sent to try and stop them. Achilles, Hunter, and Kunoichi wipe out the Dequoo R's and continue to investigate further through the air ducts where they find a new security LBC named Inbit blocking the way.
8	"The Great Labyrinth, Angel Star"; Transliteration: "Daimeikyū Enjeru Sutā" (Japanese: 大迷宮エンジェルスター)	April 20, 2011
Ban, Ami, and Kazu run into Inbit in the air ducts. When Inbit refuses to follow them around the corner Ban realizes Inbit must be an AI LBX. Achilles and Kunoichi distract Inbit while Achilles takes out his camera lenses, allowing Ban and his friends to win the battle. Kamiya sees what Ban has done and decides to come up with a new strategy. He has Dequoo R's continue to distract Ban and his friends in the air ducts while he goes and gets Kirishima. He takes Kirishima out of the control, but not before having Yagami plant a false location for Professor Yamano in the control room. Kagami then tells Kirishima that Tiny Orbit has sent Achilles in to steal their most confidential data. He is promised if he can destroy Achilles that he will be given the finds to restart his company. In the control room Ban and his friends find a hidden elevator and take it to the lowest floor. Meanwhile Yagami goes to Professor Yamano's room and gets ready to move him. When Ban and his friends make it to the lowest floor they get locked in a secret manufacturing plant. Kirishima comes out controlling the deadly tractor known as The Steel Monster Ijitesu. Kirishima scares Ban and his friends enough where they must send out their LBX's. Kirishima gets one hit on Achilles and knocks his controls loose. Kirishima aims the tractor at Achilles with one goal, running over him to win back his company.
9	"The Steel Monster Ijiteus"; Transliteration: "Kōtetsu no Kaibutsu Ijiteusu" (Japanese: 鋼鉄の怪物イジテウス)	April 27, 2011
Achilles manages to dodge the Steel Monster before being run over. At Blue Cats Takuya and Hazami pull up computer readings and see that Achilles, Kunoichi, and Hunter are involved in battle. Takuya runs a computer scan and sees they are at Angel Star, so the two depart immediately to rescue them. The Steel Monster quickly shows how it got its name. The tractor is enforced with heavy armor that the LBX's cannot penetrate. It is also possessed with a laser eye system. Hunter accidentally shoots a cloth down over the camera of the Steel Monster, and Ban realizes that camera is the Achilles heel. The three change their targeting strategy to the camera, and when they take out the camera Kirishima switches to manual view. Manual view at least slows down the Steel Monsters response time. A mysterious silver colored LBX then appears. It distracts the Steel Monster and points out the large crate above it. Hunter switches his target to the crate, which comes down and crushes the Steel Monster. Kirishima escapes unharmed. Ban is then told over the Loud Speaker that Professor Yamano has been removed and the only way he can get more information is by winning Angrivisdas. An escape hatch opens revealing Hazami and Gouda. The two lead Ban, Ami, and Kazu out safely before taking them back to Blue Cats. Once back at Blue Cats Hazami reveal they are back to square one, though this time they really have no idea where he is being kept.
10	"The Mysterious Transfer Student, Jin Kaidō"; Transliteration: "Nazo no Tenkōsei Kaidō Jin" (Japanese: 謎の転校生 海道ジン)	May 4, 2011
Ryuu overhears his teacher and the principal saying an exchange student is coming in, so he runs and tells the entire class. When the teacher comes in and tries to take attendance Ryuu asks her about the exchange student. She admits they are supposed to get one that day, but he has not arrived yet. A jet fighter then flies up to the school. A boy climbs out of the jet fighter and into Ban's class. It is the exchange student. He introduces himself as Kaidō Jin and says he has nothing else to tell the class. When Ryuu asks him about LBX's later on he ignores him. Instead of trying to make friends Ban, Ami, and Kazu head for Blue Cats. Hazami tells them Angrivisdas is an unsanctioned tournament with no regulations. This year however the winner will receive permission to enter Artemis, the contest that determines the best LBX player in the world. Takuya takes the group to a secret door in Blue Cats that leads down to Angrivisdas and lets them watch how the fights are. To their surprise none other than Jin is in the arena, and he easily crushes his competition. As he leaves the crowd yells that they hope his The Emperor gets crushed during Angrivisdas. Ban and his friends head to Kitijima's where Kitijima trains the three on increasing speed with a newly customized Gladiator. It takes a full week, but Ban is finally able to defeat Gladiator. As a reward Kitijima rewards Ban with the new Sigma D chip, a chip made to increase LBX's speed. As Ban and his friends prepare to leave none other than the Four Devas appear. They block Kitijima's shop entrance and have been told to take Ban and his friends to visit Gouda and to not take no for an answer.
11	"Magician in a Box"; Transliteration: "Hako no Maka no Majutsushi" (Japanese: 箱の中の魔術師)	May 11, 2011
While leading Ban and his friends to where Gouda is the Innovators agents ambush Ban and company. At first the group decides to walk away from them, but they tease him with the knowledge that they might know where his father is being held. Ban agrees to battle them, but they say they will only reveal where his father is being held if he can beat them 3-on-1. Ban and Achilles battle the Innovators Dequoo's. During the battle Ban learns his first finishing move, Lightning Lance, and is able to overpower them. The Innovators agents retreat without telling Ban anything, and the Four Devas remember how Gouda revealed to them that they would soon be fighting the Innovators. Afterwards the group goes into a nearby arcade where they find Gouda has lost in a LBX battle to one Sendou Daiki and his LBX Joker. Gouda is about to hand over all his territory to Daiki when he realizes there is a catch. Daiki can only claim Gouda's territory if he is the first one to defeat him. That honor went to Ban. Now the only way Daiki can claim the territory is by defeating Ban in battle. Ban and Achilles battle Daiki and Joker, but Ban relies to much on his finishing move, Lightning Lance. As a result Achilles is slow and cannot hit Joker. Daiki begins to use Joker's speed and causes what appears to be clones to appear. Before Joker can finish Achilles though the Emperor intervenes. Jin says they should finish their battle at Angrivisdas since they are both competing, and Daiki agrees. Ban is given a list of everyone competing in Angrivisdas by Gouda. He takes this list back to Kitijima's where Ami, Kazu, and Ban come up with strategies to defeat each competitor. As time runs out the group heads to Angrivisdas. Welcoming everyone to Angrivisdas is none other than the legendary LBX fighter Lex. Lex announces that each LBX battle will be unlimited regulation, meaning anything goes. When Lex finally turns toward Ban we see it is none other than Hazami. After the intro the tournament officially begins, and Ban meets his first opponent.
12	"The Battlefield of Darkness: Angrivisdas"; Transliteration: "Yami no Senjō Angurabishidasu" (Japanese: 闇の戦場 アングラビシダス)	May 18, 2011
Angrivisdas begins and Ban battles Head Hunter Gatoh and his Buld. Gatoh seems to dominate the pace with his rocket launcher, forcing Ban to continually dodge and run around in circles. Eventually Kazu reminds Ban that he needs to turn the battle in his favor through pace. Ban charges straight at the Buld and begins getting in multiple hits. Gatoh decides to cheat and use a stun grenade. With Achilles stunned Gatoh breaks out an axe and chops at Achilles shield. The axe has gun powder hidden in it and sends Achilles flying. The shield falls to the side and allows Gatoh free access to Achilles right arm. He begins attacking Achilles right arm continually, hoping to chop it off. When stun wears off Achilles is able to dodge again, but he loses his right arm in the process. Once again Ban is forced to dodge, but while he's dodging he's moving in closer. Ban decides to use his shield to block one of Buld's missile launches, and in the process he learns Sword Cyclone. Achilles tosses his shield aside and picks up the sword. He uses sword cyclone and advances to the semifinals with the win, thanks to his second round opponents eliminating each other at the same time. Afterwards Kazu, Ami, and Jin all advance with victories. The quarterfinals begin and Kazu and Daiki advance, setting up a Daiki vs. Ban semifinal match. Afterwards Ami tries to move in quickly and strike Emperor in the legs, where she thinks he is vulnerable, but Jin dodges the attack and finishes off Kunoichi in one strike.
13	"Joker: The Attack of the Evil Clones"; Transliteration: "Jōkā Ma no Bunshin Kōgeki" (Japanese: ジョーカー 魔の分身攻撃)	May 25, 2011
Gouda brings down his Haki-O's right arm and has Achilles use it during the semifinal match vs. Daiki. At first Daiki seems like he dodges every attack with ease. He quickly reveals that while Achilles has more strength with Hakai-O's arm, he has also left himself highly vulnerable because he is off balance. Ban tries to correct this by turning the lance into a battering club, but Daiki continues to have Joker dodge and cast his mirage again. With 3 Joker's on the field Ban begins to take hit after hit and seems to be losing with ease. Ban tries to create a smokescreen to see which Joker is real, but they still manage to come at him from two sides. Achilles gets knocked down to 25% power and once again enters V-Mode. With V-Mode active Achilles once again gains strength and begins to bludgeon the Joker's with ease. One of the hits reveals that there is not 1 Joker on the field. Instead there are three. However Ban cannot control V-Mode, Daiki realizes that V-Mode runs on a computer controlled AI attack pattern and begins to dodge the attacks and get hits on Achilles. Just then Ban receives a message from the stands. A man has appeared in the stands with the white LBX that saved them at Angel Star. The LBX's name is Pandora. It sends Ban a code, and Ban gains control of V-Mode. Takuya also sees the man and runs towards him, seemingly recognizing him from some other place. Despite Ban having gained control of V-Mode, his power has drifted to less than 10%. Joker only needs one hit to finish Achilles off. While still in V-Mode Ban remembers The Emperors beheading of 3 LBX's at one point in the arena and realizes he can use the same strategy. Achilles runs to a cliff wall that's a dead end. Daiki thinks it's so his LBX's will face Achilles one-on-one and sends them into the air so they can attack at one. Realizing his plan has worked Ban runs underneath the Joker's and releases a Lightning Lance when they are lined up as one. The Lightning Lance destroys all 3 Joker's and sends Ban to the finals, right as V-Mode wears off. After the match Ban asks Daiki is he was the spy, and Daiki says he works only for himself. Takuya arrives where the man was in the stands, but the man has disappeared. Takuya says he would not let this mystery man get in his way and ruin his plans. As Daiki leaves Gouda tells Ban good job but says he cannot fight in the finals that way. He supplies Ban with the right arm of Achilles, fully repaired. Up next Kazu faces Emperor and Jin in the second semi-final. Kazu realizes The Emperor has more speed and strength than him, so he gets distance and tries to take out The Emperor with long-range shots. The Emperor dodges the attacks and forces Kazu to use Hunter's Stinger Missile attack. The attack merely causes a smokescreen for The Emperor, and The Emperor gets one quick ax strike to the neck of Hunter finishing off Hunter. The final has been set. Ban will battle Jin for the right to move on to Artemis as the champion of Angrivisdas.
14	"Decisive Battle: The Emperor"; Transliteration: "Kessen Ji Enperā" (Japanese: 決戦 ジ・エンペラー)	June 1, 2011
Ami realizes that since they did not know who the Innovators spy was, there was a good chance it was Jin. A recap of the fights and the LBX's being used in the final is shown. Then Jin and Ban get ready to begin their battle. Jin promises to tell Ban the coordinates of where his father is at if he can beat him. Ban does not waste anytime time. He attacks head on, but The Emperor dodges most of his attacks. Ban decides to use Lightning Lance to force The Emperor to attack. Once The Emperor jumps into the air Ban activates Achilles V-Mode and does some serious damage, or so he thinks. In reality The Emperor suffers about 20% damage, and Jin decides to reveal his true strength. The Emperors eyes go from black to white to a blood red. His speed increases, and no one can keep up with Jin's hand control movements. Jin uses his finisher, Impact Kasier, to bury Achilles, but Achilles manage to dig his way out and starts blocking all of The Emperors hands on attacks. Jin continues to increase the speed of his commands, and it eventually burns out the control chip inside The Emperor. With The Emperor's functions ceased Ban and Achilles are declared the winners. Jin tells Ban Professor Yamano is located at coordinates 579–934. After everyone clears out the group returns to Blue Cats where Lex enters the coordinates and finds out it's the mansion of Kaidō Yoshmitsu. Takuya reveals that Yoshimitsu is the head of the Innovators, but no one is sure how they can infiltrate until the mysterious woman from episode 1 reappears. Her name is Rina. She is revealed to be Professor Yamano's assistant, and she just happens to have data on the Kaidō's mansion that they can use if they let her work with them.
15	"The Power to Save the World"; Transliteration: "Sekai o Sukuu Chikara" (Japanese: 世界を救う力)	June 8, 2011
After bringing them info on Kaidō's mansion, Rina asks if there is any place they can decipher it. Lex decides to take all of them to a location the kids will recognize but that will take on a new meaning when they arrive. At first Gouda says Ban, Ami, and Kazu should not be taken to that location yet, but Takuya reminds him they will likely need all of their bases. In the van on the way to the location Lex reveals that Rina, Takuya and himself were all part of the Tiny Orbit R&D team that created LBX's, and all 3 of them were Professor Yamano's assistants. However Rina, Professor Yamano, and himself were taken by the Innovators five years earlier. One year before Lex met Ban Professor Yamano realized what the Innovators planned on using the Eternal Cycler for and tried to escape. Only Lex was able to escape. The kids recognize Tokio SIA, a major mall that they are approaching, but when they arrive Lex takes them into a secret elevator shaft that goes under the mall. The kids are introduced to The Seekers, an anti-terrorist organization that is set up beneath Tokio SIA. When they get to the base they find out that the Four Devas, Mika, and Ryuu have also all been recruited by the Seekers. The Seekers decrypt the data on Kaidō's mansion and decide to infiltrate with three teams. Team 1 will be Ban, Ami, and Kazu. Team 2 will be Lex, Rina, and Takuya. Team 3 will be Gouda, Mika, and Ryuu. The rest of the Four Devas are to be held in reserve at Tokio SIA in case something goes wrong. The groups then head to Kaidō's mansion to try and save Professor Yamano.
16	"Infiltrate the Black Stronghold"; Transliteration: "Sennyū Kuroi Yōsai" (Japanese: 潜入 黒い要塞)	June 15, 2011
Rina opens up a secret passage that leads to the yard of the Kaidō's. After they arrive in the yard, the Seekers groups breaks into sets of 3 to infiltrate the house. Lex, Rina, and Takuya head to the control center to open the door while the other two groups await to get in. Rina lets them in, and they decide to go to different ways hoping that one of the two groups can make it to the room Professor Yamano is supposedly being held in. As Ban, Kazu, and Ami travel they are seen by security and pursued. Just before they are to be captured when Kazu decides to tackle them down a set of stairs. Instead of being captured they roll into a secret entrance into the bedroom of Jin. Jin challenges Van to a rematch with his new LBX, the Emperor Mark 2. When the Emperor Mark 2 and Achilles both use their finishers, they knock each other temporarily unconscious. Jin is shocked that he cannot seem to defeat Ban, even with a new computer processor. Ban and his friends are able to leave Jin's room and arrive at the room Professor Yamano is supposed to be held in. When they arrive Van calls out for his father, and instead of his father Yosihmitsu appears. Yoshmitsu says if the group can manage to defeat his LBX he will give up Professor Yamano once and for all. A 3-on-1 battle is held, and Yoshimitsu wins with ease.
17	"The Fated Reunion"; Transliteration: "Unmei no Saikai" (Japanese: 運命の再会)	June 22, 2011
After Yoshmitisu's LBX Gekkōmaru defeats Achillies, Hunter, and Kunomichi, Ban holds on to the hope that one of the other groups can arrive and defeat Yoshimitsu. That hope is quickly dashed as Yoshmitsu has the other teams brought in and reveals they have also been captured. Finally he has Professor Yamano brought in. Professor Yamano is mad at Lex because he had told Lex not to come back. Takuya manages to slip his guard and takes Yoshimitsu hostage, or so he thinks. Rina grabs a gun and makes everyone think she is helping Takuya until she points it at his back, forcing him to let Yoshimitsu go. When asked why Rina reveals that Yoshmitisu is the only man who can allow a certain medical procedure to be used. She needs this medical procedure to save her sisters live. Just as Yoshmitisu is about to have everyone killed Professor Yamano laughs and reveals that even if Yoshimitsu has Achilles, it does him no good. The decoder for the Platinum Capsule has been hidden as the prize for the Artemis Tournament, The only way to use its technology is to have both together at the same time. Professor Yamano then triggers some explosives hidden in Yoshimitsu's house, allowing the crew to escape. However Professor Yamano heads off in a different direction, saying he has some other business to take care of. After everything is finished Van is dropped off at home. Just before his mom can scold him he reveals his father is still alive, and Van's mom decides to reveal how she found out Professor Yamano was still alive years before. Ban then vows to win Artemis at all costs. As the episode ends we return to Yoshimitsu. He has entered some sort of strange lab, and he is downloading some sort of program into a mysterious young man.
18	"The Opening of Artemis"; Transliteration: "Arutemisu Kaimaku" (Japanese: アルテミス開幕)	June 29, 2011
There is one month left until Artemis starts. Ban, Kazu, and Ami decide they will enter Artemis to keep the Innovators from gaining the Metanus GX. However Blue Cats coffee is closed, so they move their training to Kitajima's and to Gouda's hideout. Ban, Kazu, and Ami practice as often as possible and against as many players as possible leveling up their battle skills as well as fine tuning their best moves. Maintenance is done daily to their LBX's to keep them also in top fighting shape. At school it is announced that Jin has had to transfer to another school, and at a secret lab we see Yoshimitsu continue to experiment on the mysterious young man. With roughly a week left until Artemis begins Ban gets a message from Lex. Lex has him meet in a secret location where he teaches him a new finisher Super Plasma Burst. The new finisher should allow him to defeat the top class fighters, but it is to only be used when the timing is right. Gouda reveals that he is entering Artemis as Lex's battle partner, meaning The Seekers will have two teams competing for the prize. The day of the tournament finally arrives. Ban, Ami, and Kazu make their way to Artemis stadium. Ryuu comes to Artemis Stadium with a special banner he has made for the occasion. At the stadium the group sees many of the world's best champions arriving. They also run into some familiar faces in Daiki and Jin, and they see the mysterious boy climb out of the car. For some unknown reason the mysterious boy begins to follow Jin when Jin is not looking. Eventually Jin confronts him and learns his name is Yuuya Haibara. The name seems familiar to Jin, but he cannot place where it is from. The episode ends with the Artemis Opening Ceremonies.
19	"The Fierce Fight: Jin and Rex"; Transliteration: "Gekitō Jin to Rekkusu" (Japanese: 激闘 ジンとレックス)	July 6, 2011
Artemis officially gets underway with Block A. 16 teams make up each group, with 5 groups total competing. In Group A Lex and his G Rex are teamed up with Gouda and his Hakai-O while Jin competes with Emperor M2. The mysterious Yuuya is watching the matches from his room and looks like he is absorbing the data, similar to what a LBX does. Jin continues to dominate with his split second killing while Lex and Gouda merely overpower the competition. The two teams make it through the first two matches and end up meeting in the semifinals. Looking for a split second kill Jin uses Impact Kasier, but G-Rex stops it with his fists. Gouda begins attacking The Emperor M2 full throttle, but once again Jin seems to be able to dodge everything. Lex uses his GRex's finishing function on The Emperor G2 to cause some serious damage, but the Emperor M2 quickly rebounds and slices Gouda's Hakai-O in half to eliminate him. G-Rex has a shot at a quick attack to finish The Emperor M2, but for some unknown reason Lex hesitates and Jin gets the win. After the match Lex goes outside and tells someone on a phone call that everything is going according to their plan. Over at Tiny Corp Takuya decides to return and confront his brother Yuuya. He reveals that Yuuya is the man that was in the stands at Angrivisdas with Pandora. He asks Yuuya to help him restore the seekers so they can get revenge for their father. Apparently Yoshimitsu is responsible for the series of events that led to his death, but what those events are is untold. Yuuya refuses saying they cannot use Tiny Corp's resources to hel them get revenge, but that does not mean there are not other ways they can do so. Back at Artemis Jin easily wins the Block A final to move to the Battle Royal. Block B begins where we are introduced to Masked J and his LBX Masquerade J, who have entered solo. In the first match of B Block Masquerade J displays amazing agility and stabs his opponents LBX's in the neck to allow him to advance to the quarterfinals of Block B. Ban is amazed by Masquerade J's moves, but he thinks Masked J looks familiar.
20	"The Troublesome Tournament"; Transliteration: "Haran no Tōnamento" (Japanese: 波乱のトーナメント)	July 13, 2011
The B Block Finals begin as Masked J battles one Shou Kanzaki and his Gladiator who have finished off all their opponents in less than a minute. At first Shou and Gladiator make hit after hit on Masquerade and appear to have an overwhelming advantage. It has all been a trick though. Masked J was merely getting the timing of Gladiator's attacks. He begins to dodge attack after attack and when Gladiator gets cornered he finishes him with Storm Sword. After the match Masked J tells Shou he needs to start focusing on his defense and stop acting so immature. The C-block contestants include Ban, Kazu, and Ami. They are called to head for the waiting rooms. In the waiting room they meet John & Paul, the North American champions. Ban tries to wish them good luck in the upcoming match, but John & Paul refuse to acknowledge him, making Ami upset. John & Paul decide they want to finish the match before it begins, but Asia Area Champion Morigami Keita and his Warrior break it up and tell them to settle it in their opening match. Ban thanks Keita and they become quick friends. Keita and his teammates Nakabayashi Reina (w/ Amazonese) and Kunoshita Kouji (w/ Buld) let Ban and his teammates see the specs on all their LBX's, as long as they get to do the same for Achilles, Hunter, and Kunoichi. Shortly after the first matches are called. Ami wants to fight the North American champions because of their feud in the back, but she feels Achilles & Hunter provide the best chance for them to move on. John & Paul launch their Orteha & Titan into the ring, and we see the match that opens the series. Of course Ban and his team prevail, and we see quick snippets of their quarter and semi matches. In the C-Block final Ban and his friends face off with Keita and his crew. They open up with a series on head-to-head matches that make the teams appear even. However Hunter gets tricked into a trap, and Achilles and Kunoichi get damaged when they move in and save Hunter.
21	"The Explosive Super Plasma Burst"; Transliteration: "Sakuretsu Chō Purazuma Bāsuto" (Japanese: 炸裂 超プラズマバースト)	July 20, 2011
With Achilles and Kunoichi damaged, Keita and Reina move in to try and finish them. Hunter uses his stinger missile though and causes a smokescreen, allowing them to escape. Ami comes up with a plan, and the group heads towards the middle of the Industrial Zone. Keita group follows at a slower pace, and eventually they get flanked by Hunter and Kunoichi. Keita thinks it is a move solely to keep him from attacking Achilles and heads to a corner where he sees Achillies shield. It ends up being a laid trap. The shield is all that's there, and Hunter has moved into sniping position. Hunter targets Warrior, but Buld jumps in the way and is eliminated. Next Hunter provides supporting fire aimed at Warrior that allows Ban to move in. Amazonese decides to target Hunter, which allows Kunoishi to come out and target Warrior 2-on-1. Amazonese has a major speed advantage over Hunter, but Hunter is able to perform the same type of kick that Ban used to send John's Ortega flying in the previous episode. With Amazonese stuck in the air Hunter is able to use his pin point targeting and eliminate her. Hunter then moves down to join Achilles and Kunoichi in a 3-on-1 assault. Keita realizes if the attack hits he'll be finished, and he launches his finishing move Trident. It hits all of Team Ban's members, and while Achilles shield absorbs the damage Kunoichi and Hunter take the attack head-on and are eliminated. The battle becomes 1-on-1, and Warrior has a major speed advantage thanks to Achilles damaged leg. Ban switches over to his energy gauge, and after he has absorbed enough attacks and thrust enough spears at Warrior he is able to release his new finisher Super Plasma Burst to gain the victory. Keita's team congratulates Ban on his efforts and moving on to the finals in a real sign of sportsmanship. Ban and his friends then go to get their LBX's repaired while D Block begins. Daiki advances throughout D Block to the finals with ease. On the other side a solo entry known as Yujin advances to the finals. Yujin is known to be one of Otacross's disciples, but he insists on fighting the LBX battles as OtaRed, a defender of justice, Daiki scoffs at him and thinks his Joker Mk 2 will get an easy victory to advance to the Battle Royale just before the final battle begins.
22	"The Mysterious Player: Yuuya Haibara"; Transliteration: "Nazo no Pureiyā Haibara Yuuya" (Japanese: 謎のプレイヤー灰原ユウヤ)	July 27, 2011
Daiki battles Yujin in the Block D Finals. Most people think Daiki will get an easy victory thanks to his overwhelming speed and the 3-on01 advantage, but Yujin convinces Daiki to face him one-on-one instead. Afterwards Block F gets underway. The mysterious player Yuuya Haibara does not appear to have a lot of skills, but he keeps getting victories and advances to the Block F finals. Jin and Ban both realize Yuuya looks like he is going through a series of tests instead of fighting seriously, and when Yuuya advances to the Block F finals it becomes quite obvious his victories, which have been less than impressive, were all merely a series of tests. What's even more disturbing is the lack of communication from Yuuya. As Yuuya advances from Block F, a 30-minute intermission is held so the five finalists can all get their LBX's in tip-top shape for the upcoming battle royale.
23	"Deciding Match: Battle Royal"; Transliteration: "Kessen Batoru Rowaiyaru" (Japanese: 決戦 バトルロワイヤル)	August 3, 2011
The finals begin with an all-out battle royal. Ban and Jin target each other from the start, but when Yujin also gets involved and hits Ban a few times he realizes he cannot target just one opponent if he is to have any chance at victory. The five finalist continue to go blow-by-blow until Yujin and Yuuya are seen attacking The Emperor Mk 2 and Masquerade J is seen attacking Achilles. While Masquerade J is attacking Achilles a file is transferred over to Achilles with a note, you'll need this in the future. Shortly before the file is completed the Innovators activate a special mode of Yuuya's control suit. The special mode ends up taking over Yuuya's brain and sends him on a rampage. He destroys Masquerade J and Bibinbird X, eliminating Masked J and Yujin from the competition. When his two teammates decide to run from the scene Jin realizes the only way to save Yuuya is by doing his LBX. Ban and Jin set aside their differences and team up together. Emperor Mk 2 causes a smokescreen while Achilles performs his Lightning Lance finisher, eliminating Judge and freeing Yuuya from the suits control. Yuuya collapses, so the competition is halted while he receives medical attention. Ban questions Jin on what the relation is between Yuuya and Jin, but Jin refuses to answer and announces it is time for their final battle to commence.
24	"The Impacting Last Battle"; Transliteration: "Shōgeki no Rasuto Batoru" (Japanese: 衝撃のラストバトル)	August 10, 2011
The finals of Artemis are held as Emperor Mk 2 and Achilles match each other blow for blow. The Emperor Mk 2 has an overwhelming speed advantage, and when Achilles shield gets knocked into the lava lake it looks like things will be over for Achilles. Achilles though is able to perform some acrobatics that Emperor is unable to match, and eventually Achilles gets behind Emperor and stabs him through the chest to finish him off. Achilles and Ban are declared the winners of Artemis. However The Emperor Mk 2 rises again. Jin loses all control of his machine, and Emperor Mk 2 grabs onto Achilles before self destructing. Achilles is destroyed. After everyone sees Achilles destroyed the power to the building is cut. Everyone is forced to evacuate, but during the commotion Innovator LBX's infiltrate the building and steal the Platinum Capsule and Metanus GX. Yagami learns that it was the Innovators red team that shut down the power at Artemis and killed the guards watching Metanus GX in the process. He goes to confront Kaidō about it and is told he is no longer necessary. Yagami leaves, and shortly after another man in a cloak walks in and stuns Kaidō with his appearance.
25	"The Start of a New Battle"; Transliteration: "Aratanaru Tatakai no Hajimari" (Japanese: 新たなる戦いの始まり)	August 17, 2011
Three days have past since Artemis ended. We learn that four guards were killed watching over Metanus GX, and that the police are looking for clues as to whom the culprit is. The kids practice with their LBX's planning to go on a rescue mission to reclaim Metanus GX, but they do not want to make a move until they are able to confirm the location it's being held at. Meanwhile Jin has taken over watching Yuuya and he begins to question his grandfather's involvement in the entire ordeal as Yuuya lies in a coma. We learn that Jin and Yuuya were both the lone survivors in their families in the tragic Tokio Bridge collapse that also took Yagami's family. Shortly after the bridge collapse Jin was adopted by Yoshimitsu and become a Kaido. When his grandfather refuses to answer why he programmed The Emperor Mk 2 to self-destruct and why he killed the guards Jin decides to rebel. Jin secretly goes to Cyber Lance to become a test player for their new generation of LBX's. He is given control of Proto Zenon, and the controller he will use has more memory than any other control. It also increases the combat range from 100m to 1 km. Elsewhere Ban visits the warehouse where Lex trained him on the Super Plasma Burst. Surprisingly Lex appears and gives Ban the Platinum Capsule. He reveals the Platinum Capsule the Innovators stole was a fake. Ban contacts his allies, but on the way to Tiny Orbit the Innovators surround the car they are traveling in hoping to steal the real Platinum Capsule.
26	"The Flash LBX, Pandora"; Transliteration: "Senkō no LBX Pandora" (Japanese: 閃光のLBX パンドラ)	August 24, 2011
Using LBX's the Innovators hack into Takuya's car system, but just before the car can be captured Pandora arrives and makes the save. Pandora then eliminates an entire trucks Dequoo's with an EMP while Hunter and Kunoichi provide support, Pandora eventually is able to hack into one of the trucks computer systems and power it down, allowing Takuya and the kids to escape, but Ami notices that Pandora has a hesitancy every 2 minutes and 40 seconds. When the group arrives at Tiny Orbit they learn that Tiny Orbit is developing a new Sparkbload system that will increase the usage of LBX's to 50 km and allow them to be used in space and on other planets. Ami realizes that Pandora had to be operated with this technology, and when she sees the railcar speeds through Tiny Orbit's station lasting 5 seconds she realizes it has to be someone there. Just then Yuusuke arrives and leads the group where they can try to decipher the Platinum Capsule. The group is not able to decipher the Platinum Capsule, but they find blueprints for a new LBX had been downloaded into the Platinum Capsule roughly 72 hours before, during Artemis. Ban reveals Masked J sent him the info, and then Yuusuke reveals Masked J was Professor Yamano. Ami decides to reveal Yuusuke's secret, and after he admits it he brings out Pandora for the others to see. Before they can get a closer look at Pandora though the Innovators attack Tiny Orbit with four Inbit's. One of the Inbit's self destructs, taking out Tiny POrbit's defense system, so Ami and Kazu go to fight the other three. Kunoichi gets destroyed during a massive bodyslam, leaving Kazu in a 3-on-1 battle, so Yuusuke sends Ami the start-up code for Pandora. Pandora arrives just in time to save Hunter and prevent the 3 Inbit's from moving past Tiny Orbit's elevator shaft.
27	"Awaken! A New Machine"; Transliteration: "Mezameyo Aratanaru Mashin" (Japanese: 目覚めよ 新たなるマシン)	August 31, 2011
Pandora uses her speed to cut down one of the Inbit's camera eyes. She then leads the other two into a corner where she appears to be trapped in a dead end. As the two start to fire at her, Ami commands Pandora to dodge their attacks and then simultaneously strikes down their other camera eyes. The three crash into each other and then explode. With the Inbit's out of the way construction begins On Ban's new LBX Odin, and Takuya takes the time to show the kids that the Seekers new base is right in the center of Tiny Orbit. Elsewhere Rina decides to infiltrate one of the Kaido's secret houses. She waits until the leader of the red team has left the room before going in to face Yoshimitsu. Her goal is to force him to approve usage of Optima in the medical field to save her sisters life. Elsewhere on the base Yagami is given a file that contains all the data on the Tokio Bridge incident, but when the red team begins to hunt him he is forced to alter his escape route. Also in the base is Jin, who has pulled data showing that Yuuya was used as a science experiment by Yoshimitsu. Jin decides to leave Yoshimitsu's care for good and join Ban and his friends fighting the Innovators. Eventually the man who gave Yagami the data leads him into a trap room and traps him, but Jin frees him allowing him to escape. Back at Yoshimitsu's office Rina holds a gun to Yoshimitsu and demands he allows Optima to go forward in the medical field. Yoshimitsu grabs the gun and gets into a wrestling contest, accidentally forcing the gun to go off and shoot him in the process. As Rina flees the scene Yoshimitsu is seen rising from the gunshot, but he is no longer human. Instead he is some sort of robot who has taken over Yoshimitsu's spot. Yagami finds Rina crying in the halls and drags her along so they can escape. The group flees to the spy jet Eclipse and manage to escape within it. Back at Tiny Orbit construction is finished on Odin. Ban assembles him and places the Platinum Capsule inside. As the group gets ready to test Odin's capabilities an alarm goes off inside Tiny Orbit. One of the rail trains has been hijacked, and its barreling full speed toward Tiny Orbit with the intention of crashing into it.
28	"Odin's Sortie"; Transliteration: "Ōdīn Shutsugeki" (Japanese: オーディーン出撃)	September 7, 2011
As the train barrels towards Tiny Orbit the group learns two trains in the station are unable to start. If the train cannot be stopped, nearly 7,000 people will be affected by the wreckage. The Innovators red team hides in three locations nearby waiting to infiltrate Tiny Orbit after the wreck. Seeing no other choice, Ban asks if using Odin and the Sparkbload together might work to stop the wreck. Odin launches and infiltrates the train with roughly 20 km until impact. When he arrives in car 1 he sees that the LBX General Commander is controlling the train. Odin and General Commander fight, but Ban has a hard time using Odin's control functions because he is so much more advanced than Achilles. Seeing no other choice Ban runs headlong at General Commander and stuns him, allowing Odin to use his Gungnir finisher. General Commander is defeated, and Odin activates the brakes, However the brakes fail to engage. Yuusuke contacts the linear command and learns of a second way to stop the train. Ban destroys the trains control panel, causing the train to crash into the tracks and friction to slow it down. The actions appear to have taken place two late though as the train still has too much speed and will crash into Tiny Orbit. As things look their most grim Jin arrives and contacts them with the message, "Let me finish the rest." Jin launches Proto Zenon and uses his rocket thrusters to create a reverse draft. the train is stopped with 1m left until impact. Afterwards Jin reveals he has turned against his grandfather. he manages to convince the group and is welcomed to the Seekers. After Jin leaves Ban's LBX is brought back to him. A message is hidden inside Odin. It's none other than Professor Yamano. He reveals the contents in Metanus GX can still be recovered by the group if they can hack into the world's most protected computer system. The group is disappointed when they learn even a team of hackers failed to do so, but Yuusuke reveals there is one man who could succeed, the legendary hacker Otacross.
29	"The Legendary Super Hacker, Otacross"; Transliteration: "Densetsu no Chō Hakkā Otakurosu" (Japanese: 伝説の超ハッカー オタクロス)	September 14, 2011
Ban, Ami, Kazu, and Gouda head to Akihabara to look for the legendary Otacross. Little do they know that Daiki is also in Akihabara looking for Ota Red hoping to get revenge. When Ban and company get depressed because no one seems to know where Otacross is at, Otacross comes onto the overhead screen and provides a clue as to where he can be found. Ami solves the clue and leads them to the location the Ota Rangers are located at. In order to claim the legendary LBX Ami must battle Ota Yellow. Meanwhile Gouda stays behind to battle Daiki. Ami uses Pandora's speed, calculations, and the finisher Chaotic Fist to defeat Bibinbird X3 while Gouda sacrifices an arm to pin Joker Mk. 2 and defeat Daiki. As a result Daiki becomes his servant and Ami wins the legendary LBX. The group is taken into Otacross's office where Otacross reveals he can hack into the computer system known as God Gate, but he does not want to. Ami begs him to reconsider, and Otacross decides to help them if they can defeat him in a LBX battle. Otacross controls three LB'x known as RX-1, RX-2, and RX-3. He evades Ban and his friends attacks with ease to begin the battle, and when he begins to attack Ban and his friends are forces them to come together. Otacross then decides to show the true spirit of the Ota and combines his 3 LBX's into Grand RX.
30	"Break In, God Gate"; Transliteration: "Totsunyū Goddo Gēto" (Japanese: 突入 ゴッドゲート)	September 21, 2011
After Otacross's LBX's fuse, they also see their strength and defensive capabilities increase. Hunter backs up and gets a few long range shots off. One of them hits Grand RX's chest, but it appears to bounce right off. Just as it appears our heroes are about to have their LBX's destroyed by Otacross, Grand RX shuts down. Hunter's long range shot may not have penetrated the armor, but it caused Grand RX to overheat giving them the win by default, Otacross keeps his word and agrees to help them hack into God Gate. In order to do so two LBX's must be scanned and sent in to fight any virtual LBX's that might stand in the way. After a conference Ban's Achilles and Kazu's Hunter are sent in. Otacross has no problem penetrating the many layers of God's Gate. When they reach the final stage they encounter the virtual Innovators LBX. Achilles and Hunter are overpowered with ease, and Otacross's avatar is in danger of being destroyed. Just them Professor Yamano's voice is heard and a new virtual LBX appears. Professor Yamano has hid Hunter's successor, Fenrir, inside God's Gate. Fenrir's data is downloaded into Hunter and he fully materializes. Fenrir has more power and can excel at hand-to-hand combat as well as long range shots, thus fully utilizing all of Kazu's skills. With Fenrir and Odin on the scene the Innovators LBX gets overwhelmed. Otacross begins to download the data to Metanus GX, but the Innovators white team takes drastic action and deletes all the files, scattering them across the web.
31	"Aim for the Akihabara Kingdom"; Transliteration: "Mezase Akihabara Kingudamu" (Japanese: 目指せ アキハバラキングダム)	September 28, 2011
Otacross reveals the only way to recover the data now is to gather together all the hackers of Akihabara. The only way to do that is to win the Akiharabar Kingdom title. Otacross reveals the current champion is a man known only as Master King, but every time he hears the name he starts to throw a temper tantrum saying that Master King cheated to gain the title. Otacross reveals the tournament will take place in one week and everyone should train until then. The team divides into sets of two, thinking it is a man-to-man tournament. Gouda trains with Daiki, Kazu trains with Ami, and Ban trains with Jin. During their first training battle Jin reveals that Yuuya has come out of his coma but he is having to go through rehab for the rest of his body. Jin and Ban reveal to each other how they first came to love and use LBX's, and Jin agrees to help the group win Akihabara Tournament. Over at Kitajima's Saki-san learns the kids are training for the tournament and seems eager to tell them something, but Kitajima cuts her off every time she gets close to revealing it. At the hospital Rina has returned to her sisters side. Yagami has agreed to be the culprit for Yoshimitsu's supposed death, but Rina is shocked when she sees Yoshimitsu is still alive and walking on the tv. Finally the day of the tournament arrives. Before the tourney can begin Yuusuke arrives at Akihabara Tower. He reveals that Tiny Orbit is the sponsor for Akihabara Kingdom and he reveals that Otacross saved Fenrir's data. With Fenrir's data saved they were able to produce Fenrir's armor frame, which Kazu gladly equips. Yuusuke leaves and Otacross reveals that Akihabara is a team battle, and that the teams will be Ban, Gouda, and Daiki as well as Jin, Kazu, and Ami. Kazu begins to protest saying they should be able to decide their own teams, btu he is overruled when Otacross reveals he has already registered these teams. On the way to the tourney the group runs into the Kitajima's, and Saki finally reveals she will be one of the participants in Akihabara's tourney. She also reveals she is actually a stronger battler than her husband, but it comes with some side quirks that none of them know about yet except her husband.
32	"The Opening of the Akihabara Kingdom"; Transliteration: "Akihabara Kingdom Kaimaku" (Japanese: アキハバラキングダム開幕)	October 12, 2011
After a lengthy stadium reveal the episode opens with 8 teams competing in the competition. The first round matches are announced: Hacker Corps vs. Meteo Train, Sakai vs. Ban Team, Cyber Knights vs. Ota Rangers, and Kaido Jin team vs. Jason Kurosawa, and the round is announced to be a one-on-one battle. Jason Kurosawa insists on coming over and shaking each team members hand from his opposition. Meanwhile Gouda and Daiki argue which of them will battle in the first round. The wait is not long as the Hacker Corps stuns everyone with a quick knockout. Ban intervenes and decides to battle Saki since they are friends. Saki sends out her Kunoichi to battle Ban's Odin. Saki features a style that basically runs headlong into anything and does not evaluate her surroundings. Ban uses this to his advantage to get the win and advance to face the Hacker Corps in the semifinals. The Ota Rangers decide to use a rotational system where all but OtaRed will participate (OtaBlue goes in the quarterfinals), and Jin decides to go first for his team. Both of their quarterfinal matches are also featured.
33	"Gouda VS. Sendou"; Transliteration: "Gouda VS Sendou" (Japanese: 郷田VS仙道)	October 19, 2011
Ban gets introduced to Yamaneko and the Hacker Corps. Ban asks them if they'll help them during a mission, but Yamaneko refuses unless Ban can become King of Akihabara. Gouda and Daiki's tensions with each other continue to escalate, so Ban sends them out together during the semifinals. Gouda tells Daiki if he does not like battling with him to just sit on the side. Both Gouda and Daiki debut their new LBX's during the semi's, Hakai-O Z and Nightmare. Yamananeko and one of the other Hacker Corp battlers counter with Red Ribbon and Green Ribbon. The battle begins and Hakai-O Z gets bombarded from both sides. Daiki refuses to move until the Hacker Corps decide to target him, but Nightmare's speed proves to be too much for the Hacker Corps. The two decide to leave Nightmare alone and go back to targeting Gouda and Hakai-O Z, but Daiki decides to intervene this time and stop the front-behind double team. The two use their finishers, Super Gaou Cannon and Death Scythe Hurricane, to defeat the Hacker Corps and advance Team ban to the finals. Before the other semi can begin OtaYellow once again confesses his love for Ami, but Ami ignores him and gives him the cold shoulder. Meanwhile Jin's cold attitude causes OtaPink to fall for him. The second semifinal features OtaBlack and OtaPink vs. Jin and Kazu. While OtaBlack and OtaPink have their Bibinbird's performing the Ota poses Jin uses his Break Gazer finisher to destroy OtaBlack. When OtaPink begins to rush Jin Kazu uses Fenrir's Hawk Eye Drive to finish off her Bibinbird and make the final Team Ban vs. Team Jin.
34	"Clash! Ban VS. Jin"; Transliteration: "Gekitotsu, Ban VS Jin" (Japanese: 激突 バンVSジン)	October 26, 2011
The finals begin with Team Ban vs. Team Jin. Both teams come up with strategies before the match, but Daiki quickly rebels against Ban's strategy when Pandora does not move out. Daiki and Nightmare battle Jin and Proto Zenon in an epic speed battle. At the other end Pandora moves in for close range attacks on Odin and Hakai-O Z while Fenrir keeps them on their toes. Ban studies the terrain and sees a cliff he believes could finish off Fenrir if they can distract him. Odin and Hakai-O Z move to separate parts of the arena, and when Fenrir jumps up to the cliff Hakai-O Z launches his Super Gaou Cannon and buries Fenrir. With Fenrir supposedly finished Odin takes on Pandora while Hakai-O Z and Nightmare both move in on Proto Zenon. Jin's speed and strategy prove to be too much for Gouda and Daiki though as Jin finishes them off in a simultaneous attack and then turns and heads towards Odin. Ban realizes he's about to be surrounded, but making matters worse Fenrir bursts out of the rocks making it a 3-on-1 battle. Ban is able to dodge attack after attack and eventually gets all three of his opponents lined up. He fires off Gungnir and finishes off Pandora, Fenrir, and Proto Zenon simultaneously to become the #1 contender for Akihabara's throne. After the battle Maa, also known as Master King, appears and Team Ban challenges him for the throne of Akihabara.
35	"Shock, The Sun God Apollo Kaiser"; Transliteration: "Shougeki, Taiyoushin Apollo Kaiser" (Japanese: 衝撃 太陽神アポロカイザー)	November 2, 2011
After a brief time to repair their LBX's Team Ban faces off with Team Maa, the reigning king of Akihabra. Maa has hit LBX Apollo Kaiser sit back and watch while two members of the Hacker Corps, using Claymid's, battle with Ban's team. The field is an ice field, so it takes some time for Hakai-O Z and Nightmare to adjust to it. Eventually Hakai-O Z and Nightmare throw their opponent's Claymid's into each other and severely damage them with their finishers. Maa decides to intervene and uses his finisher, God Speed Sword, to eliminate his teammates LBX's while damaging all of Team Ban's LBX's. Before God Speed Sword hits Ban has Odin run in and try to deflect the rays associated with the attack, but it costs Odin his left arm. After a second God Speed Sword hits Daiki is able to throw Nightmare's scythe at Apollo Kaiser and hit it. Ban realizes that Apollo Kaiser powers down for a few minutes after using his finisher, and it allows Ban to formulate a plan. Team Ban has their LBX's rush at Apollo Kaiser, with Nightmare and Hakai-O Z serving as shields. he two LBX's are able to shield Odin and allow Odin to use Gungnir when Apollo Kaiser powers down. Ban becomes the reigning king of Akihabara with the win. Afterwards Gouda officially releases Daiki from being his minion, and the Hacker Corps uses their thousands, if not millions, of members around Akihabara to search the Infinity Net for the Metanus GX fragments. They are able to gather 99% of the data, but the remaining 1% of the data is stuck in a net storm. If the data touches the storm at all it will be deleted. Seeing no other choice Yamaneko uses Otacross's virtual scanner to scan his LBX. He then creates a mini storm around his LBX, causing his LBX to be absorbed by the larger storm. Once Red Ribbon is inside he grabs the data and uses his blasters to create a hole in the storm. With the hole created he is able to throw out the data, and Ban and his friends are able to gain the decipher key for the Platinum Capsule.
36	"Humanity's Hope, Eternal Cycler"; Transliteration: "Jinrui no Kibou, Eternal Cycler" (Japanese: 人類の希望エターナルサイクラー)	November 9, 2011
As Ban and his friends begin to return to Tiny Orbit they get surrounded by Innovators who want to steal the Eternal Cycler data. Takuya attacks one of the Innovators and tries to create an opening for the kids, but they end up being surrounded. Yagami arrives on the scene and surrounds the Innovators forcing them to retreat. As the group arrives at Tiny Orbit Yuusuke decides to trust Yagami and his allies. Yuusuke then demands they begin creating a rough draft on the Eternal Cycler because the prime minister has approved Yoshimitsu's Earth Crust Generation project. The Earth Crust Generation Project calls for energy to be harvested from underground volcanoes, but it would make Earth's crust unstable and lead to much destruction. Over at Cyber Lance Jin returns Proto Zenon with the data he collected from Akihabara Kingdom. The data will allow them to evolve Proto Zenon into Zenon's final form. Elsewhere Daiki is battlign at the arcades trying to get some sense of fun back into his life, but he feels there is something missing. Back at Tiny Orbit Yuusuke runs into Sawamura and brushes him off when he asks for a specific report. No one realizes that Sawamura is a spy inside Tiny Orbit. At the same time Ban and his friends head towards the Seekers base and run into Rina, who has been rehired by Tiny Orbit for her Sparkbload knowledge. Sawamura goes into Tiny Orbit's main security room and shuts off their alarm system. Outside Kirishima is hired to steal the eternal cycler when it is completed. If he succeeds, he will be given the funds to restart Asuka Manufacturing. Back at the Seekers base Rina tells everyone how she shot Yoshimitsu and he survived. She then tells how she met Yagami as he was leaving the Innovators. Yagami then tells them how his family was killed by the Tokio Bridge incident and how the Innovators were responsible for it. As construction begins on the Eternal Cycler Yuusuke and Takuya get contacted by Otacross. Otacross informs them an army of LBX's is approaching Tiny Orbit through a tunnel. Tiny Orbit does a scan and learns more than 25,000 LBX's are about to attack as the episode comes to an end.
37	"Fort Tank Bardoma"; Transliteration: "Yousai Sensha Bardoma" (Japanese: 要塞戦車バルドーマ)	November 16, 2011
The Hacker Corps connect to the Infinity Net and send their LBX's to help out at Tiny Orbit. Gouda is sent down to work with the Hacker Corps; Ban, Kazu, and Ami will provide last defense on the staircase, and Yagami and his crew will guard the fourth floor vents. Roughly 1 hour is needed to finish the eternal cycler. As the LBX's begin to attack Gouda uses his finishing move, Super Gaou Cannon to take out nearly 1,000 LBX's. The Hacker Corps follow suit as Red Ribbon uses his Napalm Bomb, Gladiator uses his laser cutter, and Claymisha uses his trident. When the LBX's get past the first line Ami realizes the ones getting through are All Inbit's that run on AI's. With this new knowledge they are able to narrow down the attack patterns and use their finishers to take out more LBX's. Odin uses Gugnir, Fenrir uses Hawk Eye Drive, and Ami uses Chaotic Fist. When the LBX's are narrowed down to roughly 2,000 the Innovators send in their fort tank Bardoma as a last resort. Jin arrives with the newly completed Zenon, and the groups are reassigned. Ban and Jin will work with the Hacker Corps battling the tank while Ami, Kazu, and Gouda move up to the fourth floor to join Yagami protecting the lab. Zenon uses his finisher Break Gazer to cause a smokescreen, allowing Zenon and Odin to get onto the tank. The hacker corps try to follow suit, but Fort Tank Bardoma begins to fire randomly and takes out many of their LBX's. On the tank Zenon begins to hack into the tanks system while Odin takes out enemy LBX's. Odin uses Super Plasma Burst for the first time to finish off the enemy LBX's just before Zenon forces Fort Tank Bardoma to power down. News comes in. All the enemy LBX's have been defeated, and Yuuki finishes the eternal cycler test. However power goes off in the lab, and Kirishima steals the eternal cycler. Yuusuke goes in pursuit. Ban arrives at the front entrance to meet Jin and get back Odin when he sees Yuusuke pursuing Kirishima. Kirishima hesitates to use a gun he has, so the Innovators send another agent up which steals the eternal cycler. The agent then has a preprogrammed truck try to run over Kirishima, but Yuusuke pushes him out of the way and gets hit instead, ending his life right in front of Ban and Jin's eyes.
38	"When The Seekers Revive"; Transliteration: "Seeker Saisei no Toki" (Japanese: シーカー再生の時)	November 23, 2011
Five days have passed since Yuusuke died, and Ban has not left his room since that incident. Lex returns and visits Tiny Orbit where he is shown the new Seekers base. However he learns the eternal cycler data has been deleted. Before leaving Lex informs Takuya that Sawamura is an Innovator spy. As Takuya makes his way to his office, he is given the research his brother did on the Innovators and vows to fight til the very end. Takuya calls a meeting for all of Tiny Orbit and dismisses the entire board. Afterwards he returns to the Seekers base where he introduces Yagami, Hosoi, Yakabe, and Mano as the newest Seekers. The group reveals they will be providing support from the Eclipse they stole from the Innovators. Takuya reveals the data his brother got and tells everyone that his father was also killed by the Innovators in a staged car accident. He also announces that Kirishima is being brought on to create new support weapons for the LBX's. Kirishima is hesitant about doing so until Ami thanks him for creating the fortified box they use for LBX battles. We move to Ban's house where Ban's mom tries to get him to eat. She admits that she is scared but knows a time comes that people must fight and that Ban must recover. As Kazu and Ami make their way home, they get a call from Yagami. They are being pursued by one of the Innovators. The group leads the Innovator to Blue Cats where Yagami ambushes the spy and defeats his LBX Assassin. At a nearby arcade Gouda sees Daiki leaving and invites him to join the upcoming fight against the Innovators. Meanwhile Jin questions his grandfather and gains evidence that he is an android. After learning this he decides to leave the mansion for good. At the airport Kamiya Corp's president welcomes back his son Kousuke, who has been studying LBX's overseas. He believes his son is what they need to cause the Fairy Tail project to succeed.
39	"Stand Up, Ban!"; Transliteration: "Tachiagare, Ban" (Japanese: 立ち上がれ バン)	November 30, 2011
The Seekers learn the eternal cycle sampler is being kept at Kamiya Craft's Goliath. Lex sends Kazu the infiltration route, so Kazu, Ami, Gouda, and Daiki decide to go in, not knowing Lex is watching them from the shadows. The group makes it into Goliath fairly easily and arrives at the control center where they see mysterious controls known as acorns being made. The group is forced to hide when Yoshimitsu arrives. Shortly afterwards Kamiya Craft's president arrives with his son, who informs them they have a rat problem. Yoshimitsu and the President leave the room and Kousuke faces the others four-on-1 with his LBX Lucifer. At Ban's place Jin arrives to confront Ban. Ban admits he's afraid he'll die or his friends will die if they continue. Jin tells him loss is a part of life and reveals that his parents were killed in the Tokio Bridge incident. If that were not enough his grandfather has now been killed and replaced by an android. Ban gets more rebellious and tries to destroy Odin until Jin reminds him how Odin connects him to his father. This, plus some wise words from his mother, cause Ban to rebound. Jin is notified that Ami and the others have been captured in Goliath, so Ban and Jin decide to rescue them. At Kamiya Corp Yoshimitsu tells the Innovators to hand over the Eternal Cycle sampler when the Seekers arrive because he is changing up the final phase of their plan. Ban and Jin sneak in with the help of the Kaido's butler, but the Yoshimitsu android comes into the hall to battle. He launches his new LBX Kaiser to battle Odin and Zenon. Kaiser gains Odin and Zenon's battle data using his AI and then begins to defeat them. However Ban's determination causes Odin to unleash his Extreme Mode. Odin overpowers and destroys Kaiser. The destruction causes the Yoshimitsu android to short circuit. Ban and Jin move past the android and continue looking for their friends as the episode ends.
40	"Exposed Conspiracy"; Transliteration: "Abakareta Inbou" (Japanese: 暴かれた陰謀)	December 7, 2011
Kousuke watched Ban and Jin from the control room and opens and closes doors that will lead them to the others. Jin realizes they are being led into a trap but feels there is no choice but to continue. Ban and Jin make it to the control room where they see the acorns being made. Jin realizes they could be a weapon that is run by the eternal cycler. Kousuke arrives and promises to let them go if Ban and Jin can beat him in a battle. Odin and Zenon are sent out to battle Lucifer, but Lucifer has incredible speed. Ban is eventually able to analyze Kousuke's speed and jabs Lucifer in the side. Before Kousuke can retaliate his father contacts him and says it is time to go. Kousuke returns the groups CCM's and provides an escape route. Before they leave Jin asks what the acorns are for, and Kousuke reveals they are miniature megaton bombs. The groups escape route ends up being the trash line, but they are able to make it outside. Good news awaits them as Takuya reveals that Zaizen has agreed to postpone the Earth Crust project. The good news is short lived as Lex sends Ban the data on the Innovators target. The Innovators plan to destroy the worlds energy at the Tyrant Press Energy Plant. Mano is able to track down the Innovators research base only to learn they have a missile that is being loaded with Fairy BX's, LBX's with artificial intelligence. Each Fairy has an acorn at their core, and the group only has 21 hours to stop them.
41	"When the Devil Takes Off"; Transliteration: "Akuma Tobitatsu Toki" (Japanese: 悪魔飛び立つ時)	December 14, 2011
3 hours before Saturn is scheduled to launch the Seekers begin their attack. Yagami outlines Saturn's defense system known as Fencer, a dangerous laser beam system that can short out any and all electronics. The goal is to stop Saturn before the launch, and the only time they can sneak into the base is when there are only 30 minutes until launch. Ban is given the Beam Garter Shield by Kirishima, and then Takuya leads Ban, Jin, Ami, and Kazu through the hidden research lab lake entrance. The group gets on the control room elevator so they have the quickest route possible, but in the hallway before the control room they run into a Fairy. The Fairy has not AI on its side, but it also has the ability to cloak itself. Fairy takes down Fenrir and Pandora before Ami realizes that Fairy cannot hide its shadow. Ban and Jin team-up and use Gungnir and Break Gazer on Fairy's shadow to finish it off. They make it into the control room with 4 minutes remaining and begin the shutdown process. Before they can finish though the system locks them out and the control room doors shut, locking them inside. Lex comes on the monitor and reveals he is the real mastermind behind Fairy Tail. We see him shoot Yoshimitsu in a flashback, and when Saturn launches Lex reveals his plan will reset the entire world, but it is not destroying the Tyrant Press Energy Plant. As Ban and company try to get out the door opens from the outside and in walks Professor Yamano to face off with Lex.
42	"The Final Mission with Everything on the Line"; Transliteration: "Subete o Kaketa Saishuu Mission" (Japanese: 全てを賭けた最終ミッション)	December 21, 2011
After Doctor Yamano opens the doors Yagami also enters. He reveals they've traced the route of Saturn and that it is headed for N-City. Lex reveals he is targeting N-City because of the International Group Summit taking place there. Lex reveals an explosion 18 years earlier cost his father his job, but his father always claimed he did not cause the explosion. Lex traced the explosion back to Yoshimitsu, which is why he took his life, but now he sees the world falling for the same trap from politicians, economists, and developers because of their greed. The group leaves the lab and boards Eclipse and Lex and the anrdoir Yoshmitsu use a jet plane to board Saturn. Eclipse catches up with Saturn and launches a desperate attack with LBX's to try and lower fence's defenses. Six LBX's make it on board Saturn using their new umbrella shields, but they quickly encounter a fleet of Innovator LBX's waiting for them. Ban and Jin manage to make it to the fence control room where they once again encounter Kousuke. Kousuke refuses to believe they are headed for N-City and insists on fighting. Seeing no other choice Ban activates Odin's Extreme Mode and Jin activate Zenon's Alternative Mode to battle Lucifer. Lucifer tries a quick finisher with Devil Sword but fails to hit them because of the increased speed. Odin and Zenon get in many quick hits and appear to finish off Lucifer, but Lucifer rises and enters the deadly Seraphic Mode to finish the battle.
43	"The Great Decisive Battle in the Wide Open Skies"; Transliteration: "Oozora no Dai Kessen" (Japanese: 大空の大決戦)	January 4, 2012
Lucifer uses his finisher on Odin and Zenon in Seraphic mode and begins to celebrate his victory. When the smoke clears neither Odin nor Zenon have been harmed. Ban uses Gungnir and Jin uses Break Gazer in their powered up modes to finish off Lucifer and cause Kousuke to collapse. Before their LBX's can go any further Lex raises a plasma field to block off the sparkbload signals. Eclipse launches an anchor into Saturn and the Seekers infiltrate Saturn with two missions: 1) regain their LBX's and 2) shut down Saturn. Only two places can have the route changed: the control room and the cockpit. Professor Yamano and Yagami's subordinates head toward the control room while Yagami holds off Innovator LBX's. Ban and Jin head for the cockpit. Along the way Gouda, Daiki, Kazu, and Ami recover their LBX's, but they are forced to stay behind to help eliminate Innovator LBX's. After regaining Odin and Zenon Ban and Jin arrive in the sat room where the plasma field is being raised. Jin powers down the satellites just before android Yoshimitsu returns. He challenges Jin to a battle, and Jin accepts while sending Ban ahead to deal with Lex. Jin sends the camera signal to Professor Yamano allowing him to show the battle to the entire ship. Yoshimitsu easily handles Zenon until he cuts off his left arm. The loss of the left arm throws Zenon's weight off kilter and allows Zenon to begin dodging attacks. Zenon once again enters Alternative Mode, causing Yoshimitsu to start short circuiting. Jin unveils the final finisher for Zenon, Omega Explosion, and destroys Gekkomaru and Yoshimitsu. Seeing that Yoshimitsu is an android the Innovators recheck Saturns coordinates and learn the plane is headed for N-City. The Innovators stop battling and surrender. Meanwhile Ban arrives at the cockpit and finds Lex waiting so they can have the final battle.
44	"Those Who Change the World"; Transliteration: "Sekai o Kaeru Mono" (Japanese: 世界を変える者)	January 11, 2012
After Ban makes it to the cockpit Lex reveals Saturn is run by the Gravity Pump, and there is no way to shut it down. Jin also arrives at the cockpit, but before he can breakdown the door to where Ban is Dr. Yamano arrives and stops him saying they have another mission they need to complete first. Lex brings out Ifreet to battle Odin. Ifreet is armed wit Angel's AI capabilities and quickly destroys Odin's shield. Odin counters with Gungir but ends up missing Ifreet. Ifreet activates his Inferno Mode, and Lex says Inferno Mode contains all the hatred he has, meaning Inferno Mode is Lex as he is today. He knocks Odin through part of Saturn, but Ban retaliates with Jet Striker and then enters extreme Mode. Professor Yamano and Jin arrive back at the control room where Professor Yamano enters a self destruct sequence, but only Odin can activate it. Back at the battle Ifreet uses Prominence Raid, but it fails to stop Odin's Extreme Mode. Ban pierces Ifreet through the chest and appears to defeat him, but Ifreet's AI accepts all of Lex's hatred and starts firing wildly. Odin counters with Lightning Lance and follows it up with Super Plasma Burst to defeat Ifreet for good. Odin then activates the self destruct, and Ban helps Lex head back towards Eclipse. On the way back to Eclipse Lex reveals the words he wanted the world to know to Ban. Those words are, "Humans aren't beasts. Humans aren't Gods. Humans need to take the time to think what humans should do." Ban makes it onto Eclipse's escape hatch, and then Lex pushes him up further and tells Takuya to detach. Lex goes down with the ship and gives Ban yet one more friend to mourn, but Saturn and the Fairies are stopped permanently and N-City is protected.

=== Little Battlers eXperience W (2012–13) ===
The W in the title is pronounced double.
Opening themes

- "BRAVE HERO" by Little Blue boX (eps 1–16)
- "Sanmi Ittai" by Little Blue boX (eps 17–34)
- "2 Spirits" by Little Blue boX (eps 35–45)
- "Telepathy" by Little Blue boX (eps 46–58)

Ending themes

- "Do Wak Parappa" by Hiroki Maekawa (eps 1–16)
- "Me wo Tojite..." by Hiroki Maekawa (eps 17–34)
- "Umare Kawattemo Boku de Ii yo" by Hiroki Maekawa (eps 35–45)
- "Chikyū no kizuna" (地球の絆) by Dream5 (eps 46–57)

No.	Title	Original release date
1	"The LBX Insurrection"; Transliteration: "LBX no Hanran" (Japanese: LBXの反乱)	January 18, 2012
One year has passed since the Innovators were defeated. LBX battles can now been seen all across the city, and Ban has been invited to Tiny Orbit's new product revealing ceremony at Tokio SIA. Meanwhile, a boy named Hiro Ozora gains 20 consecutive victories in an LBX arcade game, winning a rare Senshiman action figure. After bumping into a mysterious man on the way out, Hiro discovers that the figure is not Senshiman, but an LBX named Perseus. Hiro has never used LBX before and, while practicing, nearly hits Ban. The latter takes an interest in Perseus, as he has never seen that model before. He then teaches Hiro how to use Perseus, only to realize he's running late for the even. At Tokio SIA. Takuya Uzaki reveals Tiny Orbit's newest product – a Black Achilles LBX known as Achilles Deed. After the presentation, Achilles Deed gets hacked, and all unmanned LBX across the city begin attacking. Ban, Ami, and Kazuya attempt to stop them, but Fenrir and Pandora get destroyed, with Ami and Kazuya being incapacitated by knock-out gas. Hiro, who has experienced a vision of the events, arrives at Tokio SIA and attempts to assist Ban. The mysterious man returns and gives Ban a D-Egg to battle Achilles Deed in so people can escape. Odin and Perseus are unable to match Achilles Deed's speed, allowing Achilles Deed to destroy Odin with its Black Storm finisher before escaping. After the battle, the mysterious man reveals that a new enemy has risen. Before he can tell Ban and Takuya anything more, a masked man comes on the electronic screen, claiming to belong to a new group called the Detectors.
2	"Ban and Hiro, Double Attack"; Transliteration: "Ban to Hiro W Shutsugeki" (Japanese: バンとヒロ W出撃)	January 25, 2012
After declaring that the world now belongs to the Detectors, the masked spokesman vanishes. Meanwhile, the mysterious man who helped Ban and Hiro introduces himself as Cobra; he was sent by Professor Yamano to give Hiro and Ban their new LBX, designed specifically to stop the threat of the Detectors. He reveals that the Detectors are kidnapping the world's strongest LBX players, including Ami and Kazuya, for unknown reasons. Cobra gives Ban a new LBX, Elysion, with which to fight. While Ban assembles Elysion, Cobra tracks down the hacked computer being controlled by the Detectors. Discovering that it's in the old Seeker base, Takuya instructs Ban and Hiro on how to get in. On B8, the two get ambushed by five Inbit LBX, but Ban and Hiro work together to defeat them with ease. The duo makes it inside the Seeker base, where they have to face multiple LBX, the last of which are two G-Rex and Achilles Deed, who are guarding the hijacked computer. A mysterious youth shows up, and uses a highly-customized Deqoo to destroy the two G-Rex. Achilles Deed retreats, allowing Elysion to shut down the computer. As Ban goes to thank him, the youth reveals he is not there to help; rather, he is there solely to fight Ban. Over at the Senate, PM Zaizen asks Yagami to investigate the Detectors; he believes that the masked man's goal is not world domination, and that he is acting on a deeper, as yet unknown, motive.
3	"The Chosen Warriors"; Transliteration: "Erabareshi Senshi-tachi" (Japanese: 選ばれし戦士たち)	February 1, 2012
Takuya and Cobra arrive at the base, but the youth, who had introduced himself as Kazama Kirito, has left. While Takuya contacts Rina to reassemble the Seekers, Cobra tells all he knows about the Detectors, which is not very much. However, he does reveal that the LBX are being controlled through a process called brainjacking, which occurs through the M Chip all LBX are required to have. However, Professor Yamano has specifically built Perseus and Elysion without M Chips, making them immune. Cobra also reveals that a third LBX from Professor Yamano will be presented to the winner of the Shibuya Town Martial Arts tournament. The next day, Takuya contacts Yagami and, after bringing him up to speed, asks him to investigate Omega Dain. Meanwhile, in Shibuya, Ran Hanasaki wins the martial arts tournament and is presented the LBX Minerva. Afterwards, she and her friend Yuki are having a celebratory battle outside when Detector LBX arrive. Minerva and Warrior (Yuki's LBX) are able to handle most of them, but then Warrior gets brainjacked. Minerva is forced to take out Warrior, only to be surrounded by Achilles Deed, a black Kunoichi, and a black Hunter. Ban and Hiro arrive and help Ran take out Kunoichi and Hunter, but Achilles Deed escapes. Ran is made a member of the team, and all three taken to the Seekers' base. Across the sea, President Claudia Renneton of A Nation consults Vice President Alfeld Gardyne and NICS head Owen Kaios on the emerging LBX crisis. Alfeld chooses to go to Omega Dain for advice, while Owen declares that NICS will begin investigating the matter immediately. Back at the Seekers' base, the signals for Ami and Kazuya's CCMs are detected. They appear to be on a plane headed to A Nation, but before precise coordinates can be determined, the signals are cut off. Ban and company decide to head to A Nation to investigate.
4	"A Crisis High in the Sky"; Transliteration: "Sora no Ue no Kiki" (Japanese: 空の上の危機)	February 8, 2012
Ban and Ran return home and get permission to head to N City to look for Ami and Kazuya. The next day, everyone meets at the airport. Takuya presents Ran and Hiro with their own LBX bags before announcing Cobra will be in charge of the group in N City, while he continues to get the Seekers up and running. The group boards Tiny Orbit's jet and heads for N City. During the flight, Cobra reveals they are heading for NICS because NICS can trace all super computers, which are required for brainjacking to work. Later that night, Detector LBX take control of the plane, causing it to descend early. Ban, Ran, and Hiro manage to defeat the Detectors, allowing the pilots to regain control of the jet. After landing safely in N City, the group is getting are met by a young girl, who challenges Ban to fight her LBX, Jeanne D.
5	"The Great Criminal Investigation at N City"; Transliteration: "N City Dai Sōsa-sen" (Japanese: Nシティ大捜査線)	February 15, 2012
After a brief and inconclusive battle, the girl introduces herself as Jessica Kaios, Owen's daughter. She reveals that the battle was a test of Ban's abilities, and that she's there to take them to NICS. Back in Japan, the Seekers are working on a vaccine program to stop the brainjacking of the super computers. After arriving at NICS and meeting Owen, Cobra shares what they know, and the two groups agree to work together. At noon, the LBX in N City get brainjacked; the Detectors' leader once again appears on screen and demands the President resign by 6 p.m., or N City will be destroyed. Ban, Hiro, Jessica, and Ran are given a program on their CCMs that will allow them to detect EM waves emitted by the hijacked computers. Using the program, they track the hijacked computer to the subway inspection train. As Jessica and Hiro head to the inspection train, the Seekers' vaccine program is completed; Cobra forwards it to them, and they install it on their CCMs. Once inside the train, they run into a brainwashed Kousuke Kamiya, who has been turned into a slave player by the Detectors via a control collar. His sole mission is to stop the group from deactivating the train's computer. With one minute left until 6 p.m., Hiro and Jessica defeat Shadow Lucifer, deactivating the control collar and freeing Kousuke. Jeanne D installs the vaccine program, and the LBX fail to start back up at 6 p.m. Before the group can get off the train, it restarts unexpectedly and begins to speed up.
6	"Duck Shuttle Takeoff"; Transliteration: "Dakku Shatoru Hasshin" (Japanese: ダックシャトル発進)	February 22, 2012
Ban, Ran, and Cobra run out to a nearby car to head to the subway station to recover Hiro and Jessica, but Achilles Deed is seen piloting the train. As the train is moved from the alternative route to the main route, a mysterious LBX begins to fill the subway with thick, sticky threads similar to a spiderweb. The threads catch on to the train and stop it roughly 1m before impact with one of the parked subway trains. As Jessica and Hiro get off they run to see what stopped the train. They find the mysterious LBX which returns to Jin. Ban and Ran arrive and Ban and Jin are reunited. Jin reveals his new LBX is Triton. Triton was customized for him and does not contain the M chip. He also reveals he was brought by another of Professor Yamano's assistants, Mongoose. Cobra and Mongoose go at it while NICS recovers Kousuke and takes him back to examine him. Over in Japan things are looking down for Tiny Orbit. The stocks are crashing and people are calling for Takuya's resignation. Before Takuya can do anything about it Tiny Orbit is bought out by Crystar Ingram, and Crystar Ingram places Kawamura Muneto, a former Innovator member in charge of the company. Takuya is kicked out of Tiny Orbit, but as he leaves his secretary tells him to let her handle the rest inside Tiny Orbit. Back in A Nation NICS makes Jin a member of the team. Ban and company are then taken to meet their resident hacker who is revealed to be none other than Otacross. Otacross reveals he has learned that the computers being brainjacked continue to maintain their functions, but they do not operate at 100%. Otacross then scans the many super computers and learns of a computer in Shang-Pao, China which is about to be brainjacked. NICS loads the team up onto their transport vehicle, the Duck Shuttle, and they take off for China. Meanwhile Takuya meets with Yagami and reveals that Crystar Ingram and Omega Dain have some sort of relation. Yagami then asks Takuya to go on some sort of mission in his place.
7	"The Reunion of Dragon Tower"; Transliteration: "Doragon Tawā no Saikai" (Japanese: ドラゴンタワーの再会)	February 29, 2012
Jessica shows everyone around the Duck Shuttle including places like the control room, the conference center/recreation room, the bedrooms, and the cockpit. When they arrive in Shang-Pao Otacross calls everyone to the control room. He introduces everyone to his creation, the Riding Saucer. The Riding Saucer was created to allows LBX's to have greater mobility in the air and in places like space. Because it is night Otacross has Ban fly Elysion around the city on a Riding Saucer. Ban does scans of the supercomputers on the way, and the group narrows it down to two super computers: Dragon Tower and Shang-Pao Harbor. The next morning the teams divide into two groups to search the locations. Ban, Ran, and Otacross go to Dragon Tower while Jin, Jessica, and Hiro go to Shang-Pao Harbor. Ban and Ran thinks Dragon Tower looks creepy, but Otacross reveals that it is actually an amusement park in disguise. The group goes inside and Ran is given a map of Dragon Tower by a giant panda bear person. Otacross decides they should check Dragon Tower by going up the emergency stairs. When the group makes it to the elevator, automated LBX's jump out and try to ambush them. Otacross eliminates them with ZX-1, and then a brainjacking signal is detected. The group raises up the tower with Otacross eliminating another set of LBX's with ZX-2 and Minerva eliminating the third, but Otacross breaks his back in the process. Ban decides to take Otacross back down but tells Ran to find the supercomputer and then wait for backup before engaging the enemy. Ran finds the supercomputer and learns that the giant panda bear person is actually a slave player. Ran ignores Ban's council and engages the slave player, who fights back with 2 Dark Kunoichi's and a Dark Pandora. Ban and Otacross detect the battle and head back up, but Minerva is defeated before they make it up. Otacross and Ban arrive and Otcross fuses his LBX's to form Perfect ZX-3. The panda bear takes off her mask and reveals herself to be Ami, who is now under Detector's control. Dark Pandora picks up Minerva and throws her over the edge of the building. Elysion boards the Riding Saucer and saves Minerva before the frame is destroyed. He returns to the roof and returns Minerva to Ran for repairs. Afterwards Elysion enters the battle box as Ban and Otacross prepare to battle Ami. Meanwhile the others arrive at Dragon Tower after learning the docks were a decoy, but as they try to head up they get ambushed by enemy LBX's, ensuring Ami would not have a fair number of combatants facing her.
8	"Ami Who Turned Into an Enemy"; Transliteration: "Teki ni Natta Ami" (Japanese: 敵になったアミ)	March 7, 2012
Ami battles Ban and Otacross in a winner takes all slugfest. Ami's speed seems to be too much for Ban and Oacross to handle. Otacross eventually gets frustrated and just has Perfect ZX-3 throw out an arm. It manages to make contact with the Pandora and temporarily stuns Ami. Ban follows suit by firing off his finisher Holy Lance forcing the Pandora and Kunoichi's into the air. Otacross uses his Thundercross while the LBX's are in the air to cause a breakover and free Ami from control. Ami collapses, and Ban decides to install the vaccine program. We learn the LBX's the others were fighting were brainjacked as they shut down when the vaccine program finishes installing. Ami comes to and admits she does not remember anything after Pandora was destroyed at Tokio SIA. Ami is told how the Detectors are handling the LBX fighters and decides to fight, but a severe headache hits her and keeps her from joining NICS at this time. The team takes Ami back to Japan where she is placed in Rina and the Seekers custody. Takuya joins the group and announces he'll be joining them from here on out, but he also brings with him a surprise. Yuuya Haibara joins the team. The group returns to N City where Takuya and Yuuya are officially made NICS members. NICS decides to investigate Crystar Ingram and Omega Dain behind the scenes, but first they decide to analyze the new data they received from the China incident. The kids are released for some free time, and Yuuya tells the others how Jin saved his life and how he and Jin became friends.
9	"The Omega Dain Infiltration"; Transliteration: "Sen'nyū Omega Dain" (Japanese: 潜入 オメガダイン)	March 14, 2012
While NICS is traveling to L-City to investigate Omega Dain, word comes in that Cairo, Egypt has been brainjacked. The team decides to divide into teams of two. Ban, Jiro, Yuuya, and Takuya will investigate Omega Dain while Hiro, Ran, Jessica, and Cobra head to Egypt. The scene shifts to Omega Dain's test room where we see the youth that said he would destroy Ban in the first episode. His name is Kazama Kirito, and he's Omega Dain's test player. Kirito destroys 10 LBX's with his customized Dequoo in less than a minute. While a video explaining Omega Dain's role in M-chips is playing Ban, Jin, and Yuuya are sent to try to make it to Omega Dain's controlroom through the air shafts. Kirito sees them and decides to make a challenge. Jin and Ban make it to the halls where their air vents are located, but Ban gets trapped in the bathroom and has to alter the infiltration route. Yuuya also makes it to his vent, but he is intercepted by Kirito and forced into battle. Yuuya debuts his Liu Bei LBX to battle against Kirito's customized Joker. While Yuuya battles Kirito Ban and Jin close in on the control room, but government officials show up and force them to vacate their hiding places. As the battle between Liu Bei and Joker hits a high mark, the government officials arrive where Yuuya and Kirito are battling. They force the battle to stop and the Vice President of A Nation announces that Omega Dain is being blockaded by the government. All non-Omega Dain personnel are forced to leave the premises, including Ban, Jin, and Yuuya. Takuya meets back up with them after the movie finishes, and as they wonder when they will get another chance to investigate Omega Dain, he gets a call from Alan Worthen, the owner of Omega Dain.
10	"The Masked Slave Player"; Transliteration: "Kamen no Sureibu Pureiyaa" (Japanese: 仮面のスレイブプレイヤー)	March 21, 2012
Hiro, Ran, and Jessica arrive in Egypt. Otacross attempts to find out which computer has been hacked, but before he can do so Hiro sees a vision where Perseus is saved by an unknown LBX. Hiro, Ran, and Jessica are sent out to take out as many brainjacked LBX's as possible until the super computer can be found. The enemy LBX's overwhelm them, and Perseus ends up being saved by M. Goujou, Cryster Ingram's test player. After the battle the LBX's stop their revolt. Detector comes on and gives the Egyptian Presidency one hour to stop all foreign oil shipments. If they fail to do so, he will restart the LBX riot. Otacross finally tracks the brainjacked super computer to a local hotel that is also being used as a refugee site for the LBX attack. Jessica instantaneously memorises the map of the building, and she leads Hiro and Ran through the hotel to stop the computer. Meanwhile in N City Takuya, Ban, Jin, and Yuuya visit Omega Dain's President. He basically confronts them and asks them why they keep suspecting him of being guilty of espionage when there are multiple reports showing M Chips to be safe. Takuya brings up the hidden room, so Alan takes them to it and shows them it is a manufacturing line for M chips. Back in Egypt, Hiro, Jessica, and Ran make it to the computer room corridor but they get cut off by two Anubius LBX's and a slave player. The slave player sends out the mystery LBX that saved Perseus earlier. The slave player is revealed to be M. Goujou, so Hiro and crew get ready to fight him.
11	"Hiro's Dormant Potential"; Transliteration: "Hiro ni Nemuru Chikara" (Japanese: ヒロに眠る力)	April 4, 2012
Hiro asks the girls to let him battle Goujou, so the girls agree to take the Anubius LBX's on. The battle seems fairly even until the team uses their finishers, including the debut of Jeanne D's Sidewinder-8 finisher. With the mystery LBX stopped and the Anubius LBX's destroyed Goujou collapses and is freed from the control collar. Ran and Jessica activate the vaccine system and stop the super computer. Before they can leave though Hiro gets another vision showing him the hotel could explode. Hiro insists on Otacross looking it up and refuses to leave until this mystery can be solved. While waiting for more details a computer in the hotel overheats and explodes. It causes some minor damage to the hotel. Otacross reveals that the hotel's cooling system appears to be what was compromised during the brainjacking. While it cooled off the hotel enough to help the customers, it did not cool it off enough for the computer systems. Otacross finds a second computer getting ready to catch fire. If it does, it will ignite the oil tank next to it and cause the hotel to explode. The hotel is evacuated and Hiro and Goujou rush to stop the computer. They find Achilles Deed blocking their way so they send out Perseus and the mystery LBX, which is finally revealed to be called Shin Egypt. Shortly after the battle commences Ran and Jessica use the Duck Shuttle's control pods to send their LBX's to distract Achilles Deed. With Achilles Deed distracted Hiro and Goujou are able to turn off the super computer and prevent it from exploding. Back in N City, Takuya learns that the Egyptian riot has been stopped. Rather than have the Duck Shuttle pick them up, he decides to have the Duck Shuttle return to N City while they use the train to travel back.
12	"A Fierce Fighting at 500 Kilometers per Hour"; Transliteration: "Jisoku 500km no Genkitō" (Japanese: 時速500kmの激闘)	April 11, 2012
The episode begins with the team about to board the train to N City. Yuuya grabs a copy of the LBX magazine and hears a conversation from the conductor about how Crystar Ingram's new CCM is being transported on this train. He also hears they are worried that a group of thieves called Wild Badge will attack. Wild Badge has been committing a lot of crimes lately with LBX's despite the speed. Yuuya boards the train and is followed close by Kirito. As the train takes off Yuuya reveals what he heard. 5 mysterious youths get out of their seats and head to the back of the train. Two decide to stand guard at the door while another 2 send in their Hakai-O's to cut the back train car off. As they do so the train begins to slow down. Takuya detects their LBX's and sends Ban, Jin, and Yuuya to investigate. On the way, they get intercepted by Kirito who chooses to let them go no further until they battle him. Jin starts to battle him, but Takuya picks up a third LBX in the drivers room. Shortly after the train speeds up again. Takuya decides to investigate on his own and gets locked in the second car by the sixth man. He contacts the guys, and when Kirito learns the story about the rain robbers is true he lets them pass. Ban, Jin, and Yuuya are stopped at the last car by the guards. A third member of the gang comes out and backs them up by one car. Ban, Jin, and Yuuya are forced to battle their opponents Hakai-O's. One of the Wild Badge members cheats and uses stun grenades to hit Liu Bei. Elysion and Triton go to cover for him, and Jin has Triton use a baseball-like swing to send one of the charges back towards the Hakai-O's. It stuns the Hakai-O's while Liu Bei recovers. Ban and company then destroy their LBX's, and Jin ties up the thieves with Triton. With 3 opponents down Yuuya is sent to free Takuya while Ban and Jin move on. The other two Wild Badge members send out their Hakai-O's to stop them, and they are joined by the sixth man who is revealed to be the leader of the group. His name is Bartz. Once again Elysion and Triton are sent into battle, but this time Kirito decides to join in. Instead of going after the Wild Badge members Kirito sends his Dequoo-Oz after Ban and Jin. Ban and Jin are able to counter most of the attacks, and when the Wild Badge members swoop in to attack Dequoo-Oz finishes two of them off. Elysion and Triton then use a combo attack to finish off Bartz's Salamander and finish the battle. Triton ties up the remaining 3 Wild Badge members. The group arrives safely in N City and we see the Wild Badge members taken away. Kirito decides to return to N City, complaining the trip was no fun. Takuya and company return to NICS. Shortly after they arrive Mongoose contacts Cobra with news that the Detectors' next attack will be an assassination attempt of A Nation's President, Claudia Linneton.
13	"Underground Texas' Wasteland"; Transliteration: "Kōya no Andagura Tekisesu" (Japanese: 荒野のアングラテキサス)	April 18, 2012
The assassination attempt information is revealed. It will take place at the Peace Speech to be held on Peace Island the day of Artemis. Artemis is to be held in the same spot, so the plan calls for LBX's to attempt the assassination from Artemis. Seeing no other choice Ban, Jin, and Yuuya decide to use their automatic entries from being finalists the year before to enter Artemis. Jessica proposes they form two teams of three since each team can hold up to three members. The others agree, but Hiro hesitates saying he does not have the experience needed to compete at Artemis. Otacross proposes Hiro, Ran, and Jessica be given special training by participating in Angra Texas, A Nation's most dangerous and no rules LBX tournament. Jessica protests the decision, but her father overrules her and makes it official. Otacross then assigns Ban, Jin, and Yuuya as trainers for Hiro, Ran, and Jessica. Ban is teamed up with Hiro, Jin with Jessica, and Yuuya with Ran. Jessica and Ran refuse to listen to any advice Jin and Yuuya give them during training, but Hiro absorbs it all. The day comes and Angra Texas begins. Otacross throws out another surprise. The combatants have to use their teacher's weapons up until the final round to get used to customizing their LBX's. The rules are explained. 10 battle circuits are set up around the stadium. Combatants will receive the number of an arena on their CCM and go battle there. 10 wins are needed to make it to the finals, but only the first 3 to get 10 wins will make it. If you lose or tie you are eliminated. Hiro and Ran win their first round matches with ease, but Jessica struggles with a Buld that has 100 firing rounds. Jin advises Jessica to use her memory for something other than memorizing specs. Jessica decides to study her opponents movements and memorizes them. With this knowledge present Jessica is able to dodge every attack. Eventually she moves in and destroys the Buld to move on in the tournament.
14	"Clash! Hiro vs. Ran!"; Transliteration: "Gekitotsu Hiro VS Ran" (Japanese: 激突 ヒロVSラン)	April 25, 2012
Angra Texas continues. Ran get frustrated not being able to balance the sword and shield and switches to her usual weapons to get win 9. Shortly afterwards Jessica and Billy get their tenth wins to advance to the finals, and Hiro picks up his ninth win. Angra Texas announces a head-to-had match between Hiro and Ran will determine who gets the final spot. They are given half an hour to prepare for the fight. During this time Ran and Yuuya get into a fight, making Yuuya feel like a lousy coach. Jessica tells him not to worry that Ban will have learned from him, but she says it takes girls using their own unique skills to be able to apply all the principles. Outside Jin comes across Ran and is surprised by what he sees. The half hour draws to a conclusion, and the fight between Ran and Hiro begins. Jin comes in as coach for Ran for this one fight instead of Yuuya. Despite her earlier struggles Ran appears to have mastered the sword and shield Liu Bei uses and she is able to hold off most of Perseus's attacks. The two appear fairly even, but Ran slowly drives Hiro into a corner. Little does she know Hiro is studying her looking for a way to throw Minerva off balance. During a thrust Hiro leaps into the air instead of to the side causing Minerva to lose balance. Perseus jabs Minerva from behind causing a break over and moving Hiro onto the 3-way final.
15	"The Triangle Duel"; Transliteration: "Kettō Toraianguru" (Japanese: 決闘 トライアングル)	May 2, 2012
Jessica, Hiro, and Billy Stallion prepare to battle for the Angra Texas title. Hiro decides to go with his Perseus swords while Jessica equips Jeanne D with only one gun and a shield to try and hold back Billy's Joker and his quick strike guns. The stadium is revealed, and all non-combatants are asked to leave, including the coaches. As the final match starts Billy decides to first target Perseus. He causes Perseus to run into a mine field, thereby trapping him and making it where he will fight Jessica one-on-one. Jessica mistakenly thinks that Billy has feelings for her, but when Billy admits the only thing he has feelings for is LBX's and that the matches he had been checking out were Hiro's she gets mad. Jessica is able to use this fury to increase her speed, and she uses the terrain as a shield. Billy decides to narrow things down and uses his quick draw to eliminate most of the mountains Jessica has been using as a shield. He then shoots her shield out of her hand, leading to a one-on-one quick draw competition. Hiro decides to use his Cosmo Slash finisher to eliminate the rest of the land mines, and as the smokescreen reaches Jessica and Billy shots are fired. Bill walks out the winner and turns his eyes towards Hiro. Billy's speed proves to be too much for Hiro at first, but Hiro remembers what it was like fighting with a lance. He decides to turn Perseus's entire body into a lance. He manages to knock away Billy's guns, and after him and Billy regain their weapons of choice they face down each other. Hiro gains new speed and manages to make it a close fight that Billy cannot keep up with. Billy is defeated, and Hiro becomes the Anga Texas champion. With his new confidence Hiro gains automatic admission to Artemis, meaning NICS could form up to four teams if they choose to.
16	"The Shocking Vampire Cat"; Transliteration: "Shōgeki no Vanpaia Kyatto" (Japanese: 衝撃のヴァンパイアキャット)	May 9, 2012
NICS arrives at Alohaora Island, where the President's speech is being given and Artemis is being held. They have one day to get ready for the events. Waiting for them when the arrive are none other than Gouda and Daiki, who will be entering Artemis as a team. Ban and Jin agree to confide in them. On the island also is the assassin who tried to kill Zaizen the previous year. He recognizes Ban and realizes he should be on his guard. The President arrives with much media covering her arrival. Included in the security detail are Takuya, Yagami, and the other agents. Yagami and his agents have been sent by Zaizen to join the NICS security detail. Gouda and Daiki hear the details and agree to serve as additional watchmen. They receive the EM wave program. The next day comes, and the NICS kids enter Artemis and let the computer generate random teams. The computer comes out with Ban, Jin, and Jessica as one team and Hiro, Yuuya, and Ran as the other. Shortly after they enter the kids meet an LBX player named Asuka Kojo who hopes to enter Artemis. (S)he fears (s)he cannot enter because (s)he is unable to find the CCM. However, Jessica sees it and gets Ban's name cleared of being a thief. Asuka decides to hang out with Ban and his friends after that. Ban also sees other familiar faces in Otared, whose being joined by new team members Otagold and Otasilver. Artemis begins. The prize for this years winner is Crystar Ingram's new Spark 3000. Asuka is placed in Block A, the Otarangers in D, and Daiki/Gouda are placed in Block C along with Team Jackal (the Assassin). A shocker comes up when the NICS kids are placed in the same bracket, E Block. The tournament begins. Asuka debuts the new LBX Vampire Cat. Vampire Cat seems to be outmatched from 2-on-1 teamwork, but Asuka reveals (s)he's been playing around this entire time. Vampire Cat debuts great speed and makes it through Block A without using one finisher.
17	"Protect the President"; Transliteration: "Daitōrō o Mamoru" (Japanese: 大統領を守れ)	May 16, 2012
B Block of Artemis reaches its exciting conclusion as the Alexander Sisters use their speed and weapons to advance to the final with ease. Meanwhile Jackal is seen placing chips around the Artemis Stadium. C-Block begins, and we see Gouda and Daiki advance to the final with ease using Hakai-O and Nightmare. In the final they meet up with the Assassin Jackal and his LBX Mad Dog. Gouda and Daiki rush head in and try to eliminate Mad Dog, but Mad Dog is persistent and continues to dodge every attack. Ban and the others search the stadium for mysterious EM waves but do not find any until the President's speech begins. As the President begins her speech, Jackal activates the chips, causing false EM wave readings to appear all around the stadium. Jackal switches Mad Dog to auto combat mode and then uses his CCM to activate Router LBX's that have been placed across the ocean. Otacross finds the water readings, so Ban and Hiro board their Riding Saucers to go and investigate the router at 800m. Meanwhile Asuka gets bored with the C-Block finals but realizes Jackal's controls do not match up with Mad Dog's movements. (S)he uses Vampire Cat's camera mode to zoom in and sees that Jackal is the assassin and that the President is about to get shot unless (s)he finds someway to act.
18	"Artemis's Balanced Battle"; Transliteration: "Aretemisu Kōbōsen" (Japanese: アルテミス攻防戦)	May 16, 2012
As the C-Block final continues Mad Dog activates his finisher Invisible to avoid attacks from Hakai-O Z and Nightmare. Ban and Hiro dive underwater and get into a battle with 2 Nazu LBX's. Ban comes up with a strategy to stop the Nazu's movements. He takes one of Perseus' swords and creates a whirlpool with the finisher Storm Sword. Perseus follows it up with a one sword Power Slash to destroy the Nazu's. Afterwards Elysion and Perseus dodge some attacks from the Router LBX before slashing him apart. With this Assassin powers down, but Jackal has planned carefully. He activates a second router LBX at the 850m mark. Ban and Hiro rush to the scene on the Riding Saucers. Assassin powers back up and takes his final target. Ban and Hiro get ambushed at the second site by 4 Nazu's, but Achilles Deed starts sniping the Nazu's from the air, without Ban and Hiro knowing who has done it. At Artemis, Daiki reveals that the Mad Dog is on auto mode, so Gouda rushes in with a chaou-Gao Cannon. Mad Dog jumps to avoid it, but Daiki finishes it with a Death Scythe Hurricane. Back on the water Elysion and Perseus slash the second router LBX to finish the assassination attempt for good. Yagami recovers the Assassin LBX, and then Takuya decides they should all rush to Artemis to capture the Assassin. Otacross informs the group the Assassin's EM Waves shut off when the battle with Gouda and Daiki ended. The group tries to pursue Jackal, but Asuka gets to him first. (S)he enters into a battle with Jackal and another Assassin, which is completely defeated by Vampire Cat's Triple Head Spear. When they come out of the D-Egg Jackal has been surrounded. Ban and company are on one side while Yagami and company are on the other. Jackal is arrested and taken away by NICS. Meanwhile the kids return to Artemis to get ready for their chance to win it all.
19	"Decisive Battle! Ban vs. Hiro!"; Transliteration: "Kessen Ban VS Hiro" (Japanese: 決戦 バンVSヒロ)	May 23, 2012
With the assassin having been defeated Otacross takes the time to travel from shop-to-shop collecting rare LBX kits. Meanwhile Cobra returns to the beach and flirts with the ladies only to get multiple face slaps. The kids return to the stadium and arrive just in time to watch the D Block Finals. In D Blocks Final Otarangers Z takes on Team Buld. Otasilver and Otagold appear to take on a lot of damage while Otared analyzes the enemy's movements. Eventually Otared sees through the attack pattern of Team Buld, and the Otarangers advance to the final. Finally E Block comes into play. Team Ban and Team Hiro easily advance to the block final. Before the match can begin, Ran seems overly optimistic about facing Ban, so Jessica comes up with a plan. As the battle begins Yuuya's Liu Bei and Ran's Minerva pursue Ban's Elysion while Jin's Triton and Jessica's Jeanne D pursue Hiro's Perseus. Both teams reveal those strategies were traps for their opponents when Yuuya comes back and starts firing at Jin from the castle rooftop. Jin decides to go and help take out Ran but comes back when Jeanne D gets cornered. The trap was actually meant for Jin. Yuuya unleashes his gun straight into Triton's chest causing trito to fall over. Triton gets backup and Triton and Liu Bei come face-to-face. They fire simultaneous shots and take each other out. At the same time Minerva and Jeanne D fire simultaneous shots and take each other out, leaving Ban and Hiro as the final two. The two put on the greatest recorded LBX battle and end up taking each other out simultaneously with the others weapons and finishers. Both teams are declared to be losers, meaning no one will come out of Block E, but the crowd begins to cheer for both Ban and Hiro causing the tournament sponsors to change their minds. Ban and Hiro are both advanced to the final, making it a 6-man battle royal to come.
20	"In Which Hands Will End Up The Laurels"; Transliteration: "Eikan wa Dare no Teni" (Japanese: 栄冠は誰の手に)	May 30, 2012
The finals of Artemis take place. Some teams hold competitions to determine who will go participate (the Otarangers determine who will go on by playing paper, rock scissors while Daiki and Gouda determine by seeing who can be the first to drink 20 cans of tomato juice). Others teams just tell their stars to go on (Ban, Hiro, and Jasmine Alexander advance this way). Finally, Asuka goes from being a solo player in the competition. Over at the Peace Hall, the President discusses the recent assassination attempt with NICS and with Alan Worthen of Omega Dain. Alan apologizes for Artemis being used and says they will come up with better security for the next competition. After the conference ends the Vice President tells the President instead of getting rid of all their weapons, they should work on increasing their military power to battle the Detectors. We return to Artemis where the final round of battles begin with the battle royale. Asuka uses Vampire Cat to lure Perseus and Hakai-OZ into a one-on-one battle, and Bibinbird Gold is forced to battle Jasmine's Amazonese. Bibinbird Gold is the first one eliminated followed shortly by Hakai-OZ. Amazonese then targets Ba and Elysion, but Ban uses his shield to block all of her Gatling guns shots and take her out. Ban, Hiro, and Asuka all meet at the center of the diorama for the final battle. None of them seem to be able to gain an advantage on the other until Perseus charges at Vampire Cat. Vampire Cat jumps, causing Perseus to run into Elysion. As Elysion and Perseus battle it out Asuka has Vampire Cat launch her finisher, Devil Soul. Devil Soul gives Asuka the Artemis Championship. During the post match interview, Asuka announces to her little brother Takeru, who built Vampire Cat from scratch, that his big sister has won, stunning all the members of NICS as they realize Asuka is a girl. Asuka is invited to join NICS, but she turns it down saying maybe they'll meet again in the future, but right now she has other things to do. Otacross then approaches Ban and Hiro and announces if they can get stronger then they can unlock a special mode in their LBX's that he has recently uncovered.
21	"The Greatest Special Training in History"; Transliteration: "Shijōsaidai no Tokkun" (Japanese: 史上最大の特訓)	June 6, 2012
The episode begins with Kirito facing off with Ban and Hiro in a simulation room. It's part of a training regiment Dr. Mummy has come up with for him. Kirito defeats Elysion and Perseus and then exits the sim chamber where Dr. Mummy asks him to stick around to face something new. Back in N City the members of NICS get together and review all Detector activity till date. They come to the conclusion that the Detectors want to cause an economic crisis. Secretary Kaios proposes that each of the LBX fighters comes up with special training programs while Otacross searches the Infinity Net and Takuya and Cobra investigate the Detectors. Secretary Kaios also says they will try to come up with a new way to search Omega Dain. Ban, Hiro, and Ran decide to ask Otacross about the new power their LBX's have. Otacross says that in order to achieve the new power, they must first test their bodies. He sends the team through 10 different phases that test their physical abilities, make them work as a team, and makes them learn new ways to balance. After the tests Otacross brings out his new Perfect ZX4 to battle. Perfect ZX4 is supposedly 400 times stronger than Perfect ZX3 was. The group withstands his Mega Thunder Cross and unlocks their special modes. Back we go to Omega Dain where Doctor Mummy has Kirito face off against his LBX Killer. Kirito sends out his Joker Kirito custom to battle this LBX killer and sees it ripped to shreds with ease. Doctor Mummy begins to laugh and announces it is time to introduce his LBX Killer, Killer Droid, to the entire world.
22	"The Confrontation at the Clocktower"; Transliteration: "Tokei-dai no Taiketsu" (Japanese: 時計台の対決)	June 13, 2012
Alan Worthen meets with Omega Dain staff and tells them to find a way to track the Detectors because they are attacking buildings with connections to Omega Dain through the Paradise satellite to which they vow to do so. Meanwhile Professor Yamano contacts NICS and asks them to send the kids to Britannia, England so he can tune their LBX's and upgrade Elysion, Minerva, and Perseus. Secretary Kaios agrees, so the kids head there. They are taken to Professor Yamano's lab where he reveals he has come up with new weapons for the kids LBX special modes, but he needs to do maintenance on them first. Before the maintenance can begin, the Detectors brainjack Britannia clock tower's computer and takes over Britannia's LBX's. The kids board the subway on two different cars. One of the cars containing Ban, Jin, and Ran shuts down on the way, but Jessica, Hiro, and Yuuya make it. As they begin to climb the clock tower they see the Asia area champion Keita has been turned into a slave player. He is defeated by Kirito, but Kirito refuses to let the NICS kids pass unless they can defeat him in battle. He sends out his Hakai-O Kirito custom to battle and manages to break over Jessica and Hiro without Hiro having ever used his special mode leaving Yuuya by himself to battle. He does debut the finisher Light Speed Fist Flash to finish off Jessica though.
23	"The Fearsome LBX Killer"; Transliteration: "Senritsu no LBX Kirā" (Japanese: 決戦 バトルロワイヤル)	June 20, 2012
The train finally starts up again for Ban, Jin, and Ran allowing them to once again move towards Britannia clock tower. Meanwhile Alan Worthen spots Achilles Deed watching the battle unfold between Kirito and Yuuya and tells him to send in Killer Droid to capture him. Killer Droid tries to target Achilles Deed, but Achilles Deed never gets locked onto. Ban and company arrive and find Keita and wonder who could be battling. They also hear the commotion from Killer Droid above. Inside the battle dome, Yuuya uses his shield to block most of Hakai-O custom's attacks. When the shield arm gets chopped off, he launches a surprise attack. He uses Liu Bei's finisher White Tiger Slash to knock out Hakai-O custom. The dome lowers and Killer Droid is knocked down in front of them. Kirito decides to retreat, and Professor Yamano tells Ban and company to do the same after Yuuya deactivates the control computer. Killer Droid keeps this from happening as he raises a battle shield and traps Ban, Jin, and Ran inside. The three try their best to stop Killer Droid. Ban and Ran activate their special modes: Knight Mode and Burning Mode. Minerva even finds what appears to be a weak spot on Killer Droid's chest. In the end it proves to be useless. Killer Droid causes the team to retreat because of his guns and blades and knocks all three of the LBX's out. With the LBX's defeated Killer Droid's shield comes down. The group retreats back to the Observatory where Professor Yamano begins upgrades immediately. However, Alan Worthen's not satisfied though. He scans the area and finds the observatory. Suspecting that's where Achilles Deed has run off to, Alan sends a giant army of brainjacked LBX's to attack the observatory.
24	"A Shocking Combination: Sigma Orbis"; Transliteration: "Kyōgaku Gattai Sigma ōbisu" (Japanese: 驚愕合体 Σオービス)	June 27, 2012
With the army of LBX's at the door steps the group contacts Otacross and asks him to scan for a control computer. Otacross is unable to locate one because the group is being led by a control LBX. With their LBX's being upgraded the kids have no choice but to get spare LBX's from the lab. They fight and destroy a few of the LBX's, but the real trouble begins when Killer Droid shows up. He eliminates all the controlled LBX's and then targets the spare LBX's. He also knocks out the power. Professor Yamano is forced to stop work on Liu Bei, Triton, and Jeanne D and focus on Elysion, Perseus, and Minerva's upgrades with only 30 minutes of emergency power. Killer Droid takes out the spare LBX's with ease and then powers down until Professor Yamano shows up with the upgraded trio. Killer Droid activates his K Dome battle field and traps Ban, Hiro, Ran, and Professor Yamano inside it. Hiro tries his special Strike Mode, but Perseus inflicts no damage to Killer Droid. Professor Yamano tells the kids to go to Dock Mode instead. The three LBX's fuse together and become Sigma Orbis. All three have control over parts of Sigma Orbis. Ban is in charge of maneuvering, Ran defense, and Hiro attacking. Killer Droid finds himself unable to land a single hit on Sigma Orbis, and Hiro finishes off Killer Droid with Sigma Orbis's finisher ε Drive Sword. After the battle, Professor Yamano stays in Europe and the kids return to NICS headquarters with all of them having upgraded LBX's. They are surprised though when Otacross reveals that Killer Droid is not a weapon of the Detectors. Instead, it is the creation of a new threat.
25	"The LBX of Bonds and Friendship"; Transliteration: "Yūjō to Kizuna no LBX" (Japanese: 友情と絆のLBX)	July 4, 2012
The group tries to master the new flexibility of their LBX's while Ban, Ran, and Hiro try to master usage of Sigma Orbis. When Hiro falls for a trap that causes Sigma Orbis to lose, Ban begins to yell and claims that Hiro always attacks too fast without thinking of the danger. Cobra hears the argument outside and gives them the afternoon off to cool their heads. The groups divide into sets of two to go have some fun or contemplate events. Hiro and Yuuya head to Geek Street where Hiro hopes to collect rare Senshiman action figures. Yuuya tags along hoping to learn about some of the shows he has never seen, having had no real childhood. They get what Hiro wanted to get, but some of the geeks present recognize them and ask them to battle. As neither of them had brought their LBX's they get a couple of loaners to do battle. Meanwhile, Jin talks with Ban and helps him realize he cannot control all the attacking and force someone else to adjust their pace. Back at the geek shop all 5 people that recognized Yuuya and Hiro participate in a 5-on-2 battle. Without having Perseus, Hiro begins to realize what true teamwork is. Yuuya leads 4 of the guys in a distraction maneuver while Hiro takes out the lone shark. 4-on-2 seems a little more reasonable as Hiro and Yuuya each are able to dispose of 2 of their opponents. As everyone returns to NICS both Ban and Hiro ask for one more battle to end the day. It's a 3-on-1 battle of Jeanne D, Triton, and Liu Bei against Sigma Orbis. Ban leaves Hiro to deciding all attack patterns while Ran decides all defense maneuvers. The scheme works as the group is able to get Jeanne D on her own and then eliminate her. Triton and Liu Bei try a double attack only to get eliminated by Sigma Orbis's lasers. The groups congratulate each other on their new found teamwork when Hiro and Yuuya announce they are entering the Big City Extras LBX competition. Everyone thinks of joining until they learn that cosplay is a mandatory requirement. Hiro and Yuuya end up being the only ones to enter.
26	"Brilliant Players"; Transliteration: "Kareinaru Pureiyā-tachi" (Japanese: 華麗なるプレイヤーたち)	July 11, 2012
As the BC Extras tournament begins, Ban and his friends decide to go watch, but Jessica cannot stand seeing all the cosplay and retreats before the first match can begin. Hiro and Yuuya head back for the competition with Hiro dressed as Senshiman and Yuuya dressed as another member from the series, but when Hiro criticizes Yuuya's costume it makes Yuuya a little upset, as he knows nothing about cosplay. Hiro's teammate changes when Shirley, dressed as Senshigirl, enters the picture. Hiro and Shirley team up to form the Cosmic Hero Senshiman team. Yuuya is a little upset about being left behind, but he quickly meets Shirley's original teammate, a young girl named Alice. He agrees to team up with Alice. The teams are divided into two blocks. Cosmic Hero Senshiman team ends up in A Block with Hiro and Alice, the Revenge Corps from Hell, over in B Block. Yuuya learns Alice has never battled with LBX's, only provided support, and he alters his fighting style to make them the most efficient team possible. Cosmic Hero Senshiman team easily advances to the finals and becomes the A Block champion, but Yuuya and Alice are met with a huge obstacle in the semifinals. A masked team known as Team Ota has been destroying opponents one after the other. They finally unveil themselves in the semifinals, and it's none other than Otared and Otacross. Jin sneaks out of the arena before the second round begins, and Yuuya alters his cosplay costume for each round throughout.
27	"The Important Parts of LBX"; Transliteration: "Taisetsunamono LBX" (Japanese: 大切なもの LBX)	July 18, 2012
Otacross transforms into Master Ota to begin the final battle. Team Ota changes up their LBX's and break out Perfect ZX3 and Perfect ZX4. The two use overwhelming synchronization to overwhelm Liu Bei, but Shirley comes out and makes Alice realize what she's always lacked is boldness. Alice decides to be bold and has her Gray Maid take on Perfect ZX4 1-on-1. Otared is surprised by the confidence and speed Alice shows, but is even more shocked when Alice manages to break over Perfect ZX4. Otacross fights Yuuya with everything he has, but Yuuya realizes what his love is since he never had a real childhood. Liu Bei gains a boost of speed and confidence, and the Revenge Corps from Hell move onto the final. Otacross acts out a quick death scene that makes everyone in the audience cry until he gets a phone call saying one of his disciples has found the perfect customizing parts for his first LBX Sakura. The finals begin. Yuuya once again comes out in a new cosplay, this time as his own LBX – Liu Bei. The new confidence Alice has gained allows them to go 1-on-1 with Shirley and Hiro, and when Shirley's Kunoichi and Hiro's Perseus crash, Yuuya is able to finish them off with his White Tiger finisher. Yuuya and Alice are named champions. As the kids leave, they get a call from Otacross about an LBX rebellion that has just started in Campbellen, Australia, and they must leave to stop it ASAP.
28	"The Dominated City"; Transliteration: "Shihaisareta Machi" (Japanese: 支配された街)	July 25, 2012
The team arrives in Campbellen and witness the destruction the LBX's are causing from the Duck Shuttle. Otacross is unable to locate the control computer, so Ban, Hiro, and Ran launch Elysion, Perseus, and Minerva on Riding Saucers to find the best ways to attack the LBX's in the city. Along the way, Hiro nearly crashes into an automatic blimp flying around the city. Detector finally comes on and informss the world that Campbellen is but the first city in his plan for world domination. From Campbellen he will take control of the whole Australian nation and then eventually the whole world. Otacross is finally able to lock onto the control computers EM waves, but he learns there are four readings. They are coming from the four automated blimps floating around the city. The team thinks they can handle 3 of them, but they are unsure what to do with the fourth. Reinforcements arrive as President Zaizen sends Yagami and his team in the Eclipse to assist in the battle. Along with them is Ami and her new Pandora. Otacross hacks into the 4 blimps computers and forces them to land. The groups then leave the Duck Shuttle and the Eclipse in teams of two to do battle. Ban and Hiro enter the first blimp where they find Gouda is now a slave player. Jin and Yuuya enter blimp two where they find Daiki. Ran and Jessica team up in blimp three where Otasilver is the slave player. Finally, Ami and Yagami infiltrate blimp four and run into Yamaneko. The teams get trapped in D-Eggs and are forced to battle the slave players who use familiar, yet different LBX's – Hakai-O Dogma, Nightmare Fear, Bibinbird Chaos, and Bloody Ribbon.
29	"The Truth Detector"; Transliteration: "Ditekutā Sono Shinjitsu" (Japanese: ディテクター その真実)	August 1, 2012
The battles between the Slave Players and the agents of NICS intensify, but in the end Ban and his friends walk out with the victories thanks to the finishers Holy Lance, Ocean Blast, Homura Kuzushi, and Souken Rangaki. The Eclipse picks up Gouda while the Duck Shuttle picks up Daiki, Otasilver, and Yamaneko, much to the relief of Otacross. Hiro notices that all four blimps are from the Ocean Museum locally and thinks that it might have something to do with Detector. The group goes to investigate and finds that Asuka has been turned into a slave player. Ban and Hiro fight Asuka and Vampire Cat but try to remain cautious because of her strength. Detector watches the battle carefully and decides to send someone in. The person ends up being Kazuya, who is teamed with Achilles Deed. Asuka sees the collar and assumes that Kazuya is on her side, but Black Achilles uses Black Storm in Demonic Mode to break over Vampire Cat. Kazuya takes off the collar and reveals he is not a slave player, much to Ban's relief, but he reveals that he has been working with Detector because they have found a greater threat. Afterwards Detector reveals himself to be none other than Professor Yamano. Professor Yamano reveals that the Ocean Museum has been secretly manufacturing missiles for a super weapon. Ocean Museum is owned by none other than Omega Dain, who also owns the super weapon. The super weapon they have created is the Paradise Satellite. The group hesitates believing Professor Yamano until they see the weapons themselves. Ban confront his father on turning the LBX's evil and destroying many people's dreams, but a temporary truce is called for when they learn Omega Dain is about to make another move. Professor Yamano is also confronted by Asuka as she questions why he turned her into a slave player. Professor Yamano reveals that while he did make the others into slave players, Asuka was made a slave player by Omega Dain as they tried to protect their weapon.
30	"The Father and Son of LBX"; Transliteration: "Chantoko no LBX" (Japanese: 父と子のLBX)	August 15, 2012
The team is able to shut down the missiles and Ocean Museum is turned over to the Australian government. Asuka decides to join the NICS team to get revenge on Omega Dain for turning her into a slave player. Kazuya and Professor Yamano are also brought on board, bringing the team up to 9 LBX fighters. Secretary Kaios informs Professor Yamano that he will be tried for his terrorist acts, but not until the possibility of war ends. First they must stop Omega Dain's plans. Professor Yamano instructs NICS to search the control computers he hacked for information on Paradise being a secret military base. The group finds no definitive evidence that Paradise is a military base. However the Seekers base reveals a shocking truth. By further delving into the records, they find Paradise has occasionally let off mysterious energy aimed right at nations that have opposed A-Nation's power plants. The group realizes that Paradise must have a laser firing system that is doing the destroying. Professor Yamano instructs NICS to search for the tanker Future Hope, believing it operates Paradise. The tanker is found, but a large radar device keeps the team from getting close. With no other choice 8 of the kids use Riding Saucers while Kazuya just uses Achilles Deed's flight system. The group is launched out of the Duck Shuttle. Thousands of enemy LBX's come out of Future Hope to block the passage as the episode ends.
31	"The Fortress Floating in the Sea"; Transliteration: "Umi ni Ukabu Yōsai" (Japanese: 海に浮かぶ要塞)	August 22, 2012
The attack on Future Hope begins with a battle in the skies. The automated enemy LBX's prove to not have the skills needed to stop the kids LBX's. Ran and Asuka simultaneously land on Future Hope and get attacked by ground LBX's that have been hiding. Ami makes the save. The boys and Jessica finish off the air LBX's and then join the other three in defeating the ground LBX's. Duck Shuttle lands on Future Hope, and the groups decide to divide into two teams. Professor Yamano will lead Ban, Kazuya, and all the girls except Jessica to what they believe is the control room while Cobra will lead Hiro, Jin, Yuuya, and Jessica to a second room that has high computer readings coming from it. At the center of the ship, the teams get ambushed in a missile room. Asuka, Jessica, and Ran stay behind to take out the new enemy LBX's while Ban, Kazuya, and Ami head up with his father toward the control room. Cobra leads Hiro, Jin, and Yuuya to the second room where they find Hiro's mom, Professor Haruka Ozora programming a new supercomputer called Adam and Eve. Hiro criticizes his mom for getting too caught up in her work and ignoring all the terrorist activities Omega Dain has done. She informs them the only way to shut down Future Hope is in the control room. Doctor Mummy watches the groups' progress from the control room and tells everyone to evacuate the ship after putting it in lockdown. Professor Ozora has Adam and Eve access Omega Dain's hidden files and reads what activities they have truly been performing. She decides to leave Omega Dain after shutting down Adam and Eve, but first she will help the group destroy Future Hope. Professor Yamano, Ban, Ami, and Kazuya make it to the control room where Doctor Mummy greets them. Ban recognizes that Doctor Mummy is covered in bandages and has the same hair color that Lex did. As the episode ends, Ban asks Doctor Mummy if he is Lex in disguise.
32	"Attack of the Killer Droid"; Transliteration: "Kirā Doroido o Ute" (Japanese: キラードロイドを討て)	August 29, 2012
Ban and company confront Doctor Mummy, believing him to be Lex. Doctor Mummy sends out a Killer Droid to take care of Elysion, Achilles Deed, and Pandora. The group gets trapped in the battlefield and decides to use their speed and agility to aggravate Killer Droid until Hiro and Ran can arrive and form Sigma Orbis. Hiro, Jin, and Yuuya advance toward the control room but get surrounded by LBX's. When their LBX's get cornered, Vampire Bat ambushes some of the LBX's from behind. Shortly thereafter, Jeanne D and Minerva do likewise. The six LBX's combined overwhelm Omega Dain's LBX fleet, allowing them to once again advance towards the control room. Over at Omega Dain, Kirito finds evidence on their computer that supports the idea that Lex is Doctor Mummy. He also finds that Omega Dain is tied to someone in the presidency. He decides to take this knowledge to Alan Worthen so he can complete the Cyclops AI he's working on. Back on Future Hope, Kazuya accidentally shoots the wires on Killer Droid's feet, causing him to slow down. Ami uses this opportunity to shoot Killer Droid in the chest and weaken the shield surrounding them. Killer Droid raises up in a frenzy and reboots. Elsewhere on the ship, Doctor Ozora powers down Adam and Eve and apologizes for them having to suffer from Omega Dain's plan because of their innocence. Hiro and the others arrive, and Killer Droid senses their LBX's so it expands the shield to encompass the newcomers. Ban, Hiro, and Ran try to form Sigma Orbis, but Killer Droid would not let their LBX's get close to each other. The others decide to use a coordinated attack on Killer Droid's leg wires to slow it down enough to allow Sigma Orbis to form. At the President's office Jessica's father arrives and forces his way into the office. He reveals Omega Dain's hidden weapon and reveals that someone in the Presidency is working with them. Back at Omega Dain, Kirito makes it to Alan Worthen's office and finds it empty. As he prepares to leave, he sees blood on the floor. Kirito runs over to the blood and discovers Alan Worthen who is now dead. Back on Future Hope, Sigma Orbis transforms and destroys Killer Droid with one shot. Doctor Mummy flees, but before Professor Yamano can power down the computer, Doctor Ozora arrives and makes them let her do it. The ship is programmed to explode if any unauthorized users get on the computer. As she begins powering down the ship, she learns a shocking secret. Secretary Kaios is called and informed that Vice President Alfeld Gardyne is the spy in the presidency. Alfeld calls in support from Bishop, Omega Dain's computer technician, and reveals he is actually an assassin who has killed Alan Worthen. His goal now is to give the Presidency to Alfeld, which means Secretary Kaios and the President have just become new collateral damage in his plan. The two are taken away by the infiltration spies and Alfeld laughs at their predicament.
33	"The Secret of Paradise"; Transliteration: "Paradaisu no Himitsu" (Japanese: パラダイスの秘密)	September 5, 2012
Alfeld forces the President and Secretary Kaios to accompany him to the National Defense Base, a defense base which controls all satellites for A-Nation. After entering the base the President and Secretary Kaios are introduced to Doctor Mummy, whom Alfeld refers to as Lex. Over on Future Hope, Doctor Ozora finishes powering down the base when Hiro receives one of his visions of the future. Hiro foresees a scenario where the President and Secretary Kaios perish in an explosion at the National Defense Base. Jessica recognizes the description of the building Hiro describes and gets him to confirm it is the National Defense Base. The team boards the Duck Shuttle and departs for the National Defense Base. Along the way, Cobra is able to hack into the base's cameras, with the help of Professor Yamano, and they confirm the President and Secretary Kaios are being held there. Back at the National Defense Base, Alfeld questions the President on the code to access the satellite controls. The President refuses to give him the codes, and he says they will be doing this in a while. As the Duck Shuttle flies toward the National Defense Base, Professor Yamano is asked some questions by Doctor Ozora and the kids. One of the questions he gets asked is how he was able to be Detector when the kids were in England standing next to him. Kazuya admits that it was a pre-recorded segment and that he was helping Professor Yamano by that time. As they get closer Takuya expresses a concern about getting the Duck Shuttle close enough with being detected. Otacross finds a path in the canyon that will keep the Duck Shuttle off the National Defense Base's radar, and Metamo R flies them through that route. Unluckily for the group LBX's have been dispatched around the National Defense Base in case something like this happens. Ban, Hiro, and Ran are forced to launch their LBX's on the Flying Saucers to do battle with the Defense Base LBX's.
34	"Rushing the Defense Base"; Transliteration: "Totsunyū Kokubō Kichi" (Japanese: 突入 国防基地)	September 12, 2012
After landing, the groups divides into 3 teams to infiltrate the Defense Base. Team 1 is Jessica, Asuka, Yuuya, and Takuya. Team 2 id Ban, Hiro, Ran, and Professor Yamano. Team 3 consists of Jin, Ami, Kazuya, and Cobra. While the groups make their way up three canyons to sneak into the base, Otacross and Professor Ozora find the best infiltration route for the base using a video game simulation. Words reaches the Defense Base that one platoon of their LBX's has been eliminated, so they send an army of LBX's down the canyon to try and slow everyone down. Jessica, Asuka, Yuuya, Jin, Ami, and Kazuya are all spotted by the defense LBX's and are forced to fight. Ban, Hiro, Ran, and Professor Yamano spot the defense LBX's before they are spotted and hide behind a rock where they would not be seen. The defense LBX's give up on them. Professor Yamano spots a side canyon trail that will take them to the same location without getting caught, so Ban and company go up that trail. Professor Ozora successfully finds a way through the case to the command center and sends the data to the teams. Ban sends Elysion in to knock out the fans, and then the team begins sneaking through the base. All is going well until Hiro trips in the vehicle assembly area and causes some noise. Groups come rushing to capture them, but the other two teams arrive and cause a distraction, allowing Ban and his team to make it to the command center's entryway. As they arrive at the entryway they are confronted by Lt. Jack Gelato, leader of the Fire Sweets LBX squad. He uses one of Professor Yamano's original creations, Proto I to engage the guys in a D-egg battle. Proto I has amazing speed and a special mechanism known as the High-Dimensional Multiple Joint System that lets it flip when it gets attacked from both sides.
35	"The Threatening LBX Proto I"; Transliteration: "Kyōi no LBX Puroto I" (Japanese: 脅威のLBX プロト・I)	September 19, 2012
Proto I proves to be too strong for Ban, Hiro, and Ran to handle. However Professor Yamano notices Proto I still has a problem with overheating. Ban proposes the merge to form Sigma Orbis, but Professor Yamano tells him to wait until they have only around 10% power remaining. If they can cause Proto I to overheat, they have a chance of beating him with Sigma Orbis. Minerva gets severely damaged, but Ban and Hiro use Elysion and Perseus to distract Proto I until it's time to merge. With only 10% power remaining, the group merges into Sigma Orbis. With roughly only 5% power remaining Proto I finally overheats and Sigma Orbis is able to beat him. The group shows Jack Gelato proof of the President and Secretary Kaios having been brought in, and he decides to help the group. Jack tries to enter the passcode to access the command center, but it has been changed, and the President and Secretary Kaios are trapped inside. Alfeld, Doctor Mummy, and Bishop are seen boarding the space shuttle at the base as they were unable to gain the needed passcode, but they seem unfazed. Ban and company use Sigma Orbis's finisher to open the door, and Secretary Kaios and the President escape with only 5 seconds to spare before the command center explodes. The group races to the shuttle's control room and the shuttle's launch pad as two different teams to try and stop the launch. Professor Yamano is able to hack part of the ship's system and tries to dump the fuel, but instead the Command Center's computers all power down. The ship launches as Alfeld heads toward space. Secretary Kaios then announces they will return to NICS immediately and re-equip the Duck Shuttle so the kids can pursue them into space and stop Paradise permanently.
36	"Take Off into Space"; Transliteration: "Uchū e no Hasshin" (Japanese: 宇宙への発進)	October 3, 2012
After dropping off Secretary Kaios and the President, the team heads to a secondary NICS facility to modify the Duck Shuttle for space travel. Meanwhile, in space, Alfeld, Doctor Mummy, and Bishop board Paradise and Doctor Mummy is tasked with starting up Paradise. Doctor Mummy succeeds, and Alfeld begins to laugh. While Duck Shuttle is being updated, Professor Yamano announces that Minerva will be getting upgrades to make her worthy of space travel. He also reveals that they have been given two Proto I's by Jack Gelato and that these LBX's will be customized for Ban and Hiro. Detector returns, though everyone suspects it is actually Alfeld. Detector orders the world to surrender and vows to show everyone the Detectors' real power. Alfeld uses the Paradise satellite to destroy an unmanned A-Nation Island. He then gives everyone a 6-hour deadline to surrender or he will destroy their nations one-by-one. Secretary Kaios and the President think about what they should do when the NICS main headquarter computer goes into lockdown and traps everyone in the facility. Alfeld comes on and announces the President has been kidnapped by Detector but that A Nation will continue to fight the terrorists. The people rally and support his words. Secretary Kaios learns that the direct communication with Duck Shuttle is still active and contacts the group. Doctor Ozora informs him that the lockdown probably means NICS will be the next target. She also reveals it takes 6 hours to recharge the satellite cannon. Duck Shuttle's renovations are completed and Professor Yamano begins construction on an upgraded Minerva. After the Duck Shuttle loads onto the launch pad many enemy LBX's begin attacking. The kids, minus Ran, launch on the Riding Saucers and start taking out many of the LBX's, but they are overwhelmed. When the launch pad gets attacked, Hiro and Ban decide to sacrifice their Riding Saucers to keep it safe. Triton and Liu Bei save Elysion and Perseus. The kids reboard the Duck Shuttle and launch only seconds before the launch pad is destroyed, but they make it into space safely.
37	"The Descent of Icarus"; Transliteration: "Ikarosu no Kōrin" (Japanese: イカロスの降臨)	October 10, 2012
After making it into space, Doctor Ozora reveals that with Paradise's computer reactivated, they will face a dangerous laser defense system. Otacross comes up with the idea that they can create a dodging program and avoid the lasers successfully so they can infiltrate Paradise. Otacross and Doctor Ozora begin working on the new program. Meanwhile the kids are reminded that their LBX's must remain on the Flying Saucers and use various long range guns or they will lose their LBX's to space forever. The exception to this is Achilles Deed and the newly remodeled Minerva Kai, which is presented back to Ran. After giving Ran Minerva Kai, Professor Yamano returns to working on new LBX's for Ban and Hiro. Enemy LBX's begin to attack, and everyone launches except Ban and Hiro. The damage Elysion and Perseus suffered from the sacrifice of their Flying Saucers has penetrated their cores, making them unable to be used. Minerva Kai and Achilles Deed do their best to take out any enemy LBX's that get too close while the others fly out further, but Duck Shuttle comes under attack. Too much damage to Duck Shuttle would make it unable to re-enter Earth's atmosphere. Professor Yamano completes the modifications to the Proto I's, and Ban and Hiro launch Ikaros Zero and Ikaros Force. Ikaros Zero and Ikaros Force easily dispose of the enemy LBX's while debuting a new mode they have – weapons form. Under weapons form, the Ikaros can turn into a weapon their partner can use to delete most enemies with a finishing function. In this episode, Ban turns Ikaros Zero into weapon form and Hiro destroys most of the enemy LBX's with the Finishing Function 00 Sword. The group has their LBX's reboard the Duck Shuttle. On Paradise Kirito vows to get the 3% data he needs to finish his program to bring his girlfriend back to life before Ban and company get there. Duck Shuttle comes into range of the laser defense system, and when the ship gets down to a 20% dodge rate, it looks like they will be destroyed. However Doctor Ozora and Otacross arrive with the dodging program and uploads Metamo R with it. He is able to get the Duck Shuttle to dodge all attacks and get under the satellite where there are no lasers, allowing the Ikaros and Minerva Kai to go out and create a passage for them.
38	"Capturing Paradise"; Transliteration: "Paradaisu o Kōryaku Seyo" (Japanese: パラダイスを攻略せよ)	October 17, 2012
In order to get inside Paradise, Ikaros Force, Ikaros Zero, and Minerva Kai must create an opening. Ikaros Force goes into his weapon form and Ikaros Zero uses Meteor Breaker to penetrate the first layer of steel. Minerva Kai then uses her Extreme Flame Avalanche finisher to penetrate the second layer and create the needed opening. Ikaros Force then downloads the blue prints for Paradise, allowing Otacross to come up with a route to the command center. In order to make it to the command center the group will have to divide into 4 teams and destroy the limiters, thereby activating the elevator. Otacross leads the group into Paradise, but about halfway in they are cut off by Kirito. Kirito has decided to get the final 3% he needs to complete Cyclops AI through battle. He traps Ban, Hiro, and Ran in a D-Egg and sends out his Dequoo OZ, Hakai-O Kirito Custom, and Joker Kirito Custom to battle Ikaros Zero, Ikaros Force, and Minerva Kai. A glimpse of Kirito's past is seen. Many weeks ago, Kirito had a girlfriend named Amy. One rainy day, Kirito was running late to a date and a truck slid on the wet road and killed Amy right in front of his eyes. Kirito built an android version of Amy, but without the perfect brain it lacked the feelings that it was Amy. Alan Worthen offered Kirito the perfect brain on the pretext that he would become Omega Dain's test player. That perfect brain is part of Cyclops AI and sits now at 97%. The group begins to battle, and Ikaros Zero destroys Hakai-O Kirito Custom with Cosmo Slash. Minerva Kai destroys Joker Kirito custom with Extreme Flame Avalanche. Just before Ban can unleash Ikaros Force's finisher, the download reaches 100% and Dequo-OZ powers up abruptly. Ikaros Zero transforms into weapon mode and they unleash the Meteor Breaker to counter Dequoo-OZ's strength from the finisher X Blade. The two powerful finishers makes the D-Egg to go unstable and allows a mysterious LBX to infiltrate the battlefield. The mysterious LBX stabs Dequoo-OZ through the chest and steals the perfect brain. Alfeld comes on and thanks Kirito for his hardwork and relieves him of his duties, announcing that the perfect brain can only work in LBX's and could never work in an android. Alfeld's LBX flees with the perfect brain, and the kids are able to move on. Kirito collapses to the ground utterly devastated. As the group moves on they divide into teams. Ami goes with Kazuya, Jin with Yuuya, Jessica with Asuka, and Ban, Hiro, and Ran travel with Professor Yamano and Doctor Ozora. They destroy the limiters and activate the emergency elevators. As the groups arrive in the control corridor hallway an alarm sounds. The emergency doors to the control center close with only Ban's team making it through to the elevator. Seeing no other choice Ban's group takes the elevator to the control room where they are welcomed by Alfeld, Doctor Mummy, and Bishop with only 15 minutes left until the satellite can fire again.
39	"The Ultimate Power of Zeus"; Transliteration: "Kyūkyoku no Chikara Zeusu" (Japanese: 究極の力 ゼウス)	October 24, 2012
Ota X finds a way for the other teams to get out, while Ban and his team have a confrontation with Gardyne. He relates a story of how his father was wrongly accused of corruption, and his career destroyed. Alfeld's father died without realizing his dreams of a blissful future, devoid of corruption. He knew that his father's lack of power was what killed him. Therefore, he used all his power when he launched Operation Paradise. Lex then challenges Team Jin and Team Yuuya to a Killer Droid each. Gardyne meanwhile challenges Ban, Hiro and Ran to a battle against Zeus, the LBX with perfect brain. The teams defeat Dr. Mummy with their finishers. Adam and Eve suddenly finish their energy reload and lock onto their target, NICS. Gardyne orders Mummy to fire the laser, but he refuses. He binds them with a special gun of his, then reveals himself to be Mami Hiyama, Lex's little sister. Ban remembers Lex's final words about humans not being gods or beasts. Mami then continues Lex's dream. She then temporarily stuns Gardyne and Bishop. Using Lex's CCM and Zeus, she asks Ban for a challenge.
40	"Awakening Adam and Eve"; Transliteration: "Adamu to Ibu no Kakusei" (Japanese: アダムとイブの覚醒)	October 31, 2012
Mami and Ban, Hiro and Ran continue their battle. Ran manages to land her attack function on Zeus' left leg. This weakness is exploited by Hiro and Ban to defeat Zeus. Haruka, meanwhile, talks to Adam and Eve, telling them to stop attacking NICS, but they seem to disobey. Mami then presses the button to fire the main laser, but nothing happens. Haruka then explains, relieved, that Adam and Eve actually did obey her commands. She then attempts to command them to manual shut down process, but Adam and Eve refuse, who have now become sentient. Dr. Yamano explains that the Adam and Eve AI only serve one purpose: thinking. They keep answering question on question, command on command. If this process is disturbed, they experience one emotion: death. Adam and Eve have learnt this by themselves. Adam and Eve then use Zeus, and Mami launches a Killer Droid, Pegasus, and Zeus harnesses it as the episode comes to a close.
41	"Countdown to Destruction"; Transliteration: "Hametsu e no Kauntodaun" (Japanese: 破滅へのカウントダウン)	November 7, 2012
Killer Droid Pegasus starts fighting with Ban and the others. As Minerva is damaged it doesn't fight. Adam and Eve sends Ban and Hiro's battle data to Zeus. Miss Haruka says to Dr. Yamano that it is impossible to beat Adam and Eve because it contains their battle data. Dr. Yamano says her that when Hiro's concentration level reaches a certain limit, he performs much faster and Adam and Eve doesn't know about it. Ban turns Ikaros Zero into weapons form and Hiro attacks Killer Droid Pegasus. Later, the vice versa happens and Ban uses Meteor Breaker and destroys Killer Droid Pegasus. After that, Miss Haruka permanently deletes Adam and Eve and everyone returns to Earth. The police arrests Mami, Alfeld and Bishop. The President thanks and appreciates Ban and others.
42	"Inadan Aki's Crazy Laughing Special!!"; Transliteration: "Inadan Toki no Bakunetsu Gattai Supesharu!!" (Japanese: イナダン秋の爆熱合体スペシャル!!)	November 21, 2012
Summary of all episodes by Ban, Ran, Hiro and Ota X
43	"The Boy with the Glowing Eyes"; Transliteration: "Hikaru Me no Shōnen" (Japanese: 光る目の少年)	November 28, 2012
It's been weeks since the Paradise satellite was destroyed, and LBXs are back to being a child's life and hobby. However, a mysterious youth arrives in N City and starts a rebellion using his LBX Vector. The NICS team are called in to assess the situation. In the chaos, Ban, Hiro and Ran follow the black LBX to a subway tunnel. After receiving contact from Vector, Ran's Minerva Kai goes berserk and starts attacking Ikaros Zero and Ikaros Force until Kirito uses Fenrir Flare to render Minerva Kai break over. Later, the mysterious youth appears and introduces himself to be Mizell.
44	"The Flying Devil"; Transliteration: "Soratobu Akuma" (Japanese: 空飛ぶ悪魔)	December 5, 2012
After the rebellion, the team is called back to headquarters. They speculate that the reason Minerva Kai went berserk is because of a phenomenon called as Ghost Jack. They believe that Vector has the ability to control any LBX or computer. Before they can come to a conclusion, they turn to the attention of another LBX rebellion taking place. Unbeknownst to them, the fighter jet Eclipse gets hacked and flies away. After the rebellion gets quelled, Eclipse appears in the sky, where it descends and transforms into a gigantic robotic machine which Mizell names as Mizell Trouzer.
45	"Perfect World"; Transliteration: "Pāfekuto Wārudo" (Japanese: パーフェクトワールド)	December 12, 2012
Mizell starts hacking into all the electronic devices in the city. He then broadcasts his intentions of optimizing the world before taking off. NICS soon find themselves in a pinch after being unable to come up with a plan to defeat Mizell. Doctor Yamano later suggests the team with using a prototype called as the AX-000, which could be the only thing that can defeat Mizell.
46	"The Ultimate Prototype"; Transliteration: "Kyūkyoku no Purototaipu" (Japanese: 究極のプロトタイプ)	December 19, 2012
Doctor Yamano reveals the reason behind the development of the AX-000 to the team. They then conclude that they must get the blueprint for the AX-000 which is hidden in the old Innovator base. Their plan gets interrupted when they get a report about a power station in Indonesia under attack by ghost jacked LBXs. The team splits into two with Hiro, Jessica, Ran, Asuka and Cobra going to Indonesia to quell the rebellion, and Ban, Ami, Kazuya, Jin, Yagami and Doctor Yamano going to the Innovator base.
47	"Get the Blueprint"; Transliteration: "Sekkeizu o Te ni Irero" (Japanese: 設計図を手に入れろ)	December 26, 2012
Ban and his team arrive at the old Innovator base where they find that the base is heavily guarded by ghost jacked LBXs. Fortunately, they manage to enter the base using a secret entrance which is known only to Jin. They reach the control room and finds the AX-000 blueprint, which Doctor Yamano downloads into Ikaros Zero. But before they can escape, Vector launches a surprise attack on the team using Killer Droid Pegasus. After taking some heavy beating, they manage to defeat Vector. On the other hand, Hiro and his team manager to retake control of the power station. Suddenly, they get a report that Tiny Orbit is attacked and is under control by Vector.
48	"The Deadly Luminous Shooter"; Transliteration: "Hissatsu Ruminasu Shūtā" (Japanese: 必殺 ルミナスシューター)	January 9, 2013
Ban and his team arrive at Tiny Orbit which is currently in lockdown. Professor Kitajima narrates the reason behind the siege and suggests the team to bring the situation under control. Inside the building, Vector ghost jacks all the LBXs and drives all the workers outside. Takuya shuts down the power so that Vector won't get the data they need. Rina, who is still trapped inside while retrieving important data gets rescued by Ban and Ami. Another worker, Yuki gets rescued by Jin and Kazuya. Before they can escape, they get confronted by a ghost jacked Odin. The team starts battling Odin, who proves to be too strong for them. Yuki then suggests the use of a weapon known as the Luminous Shooter, which Kazuya uses to destroy Odin in one shot.
49	"Fight to the Death in the Tunnel"; Transliteration: "Kōdō-nai no Shitō" (Japanese: 坑道内の死闘)	January 16, 2013
Doctor Yamano and his team of scientists start the development of the AX-000. Doctor Ozora later suggests the use of a special heat-resistant metal called Stanfield Ingot. But Rina tells that the import of Stanfield Ingot came to a halt many months ago. Fortunately, they locate a mine in China which has Stanfield Ingot. Ban, Hiro, Ran, Asuka and Cobra travel to China where they find a large number of ghost jacked LBXs and Vector guarding the entrance. They manage to defeat them and get some of the Stanfield Ingot and return to NICS.
50	"The Lost City of LBX"; Transliteration: "LBX no Kieta Machi" (Japanese: LBXの消えた街)	January 23, 2013
51	"The Completion of Super O Legion"; Transliteration: "Chō Kansei ōregion" (Japanese: 超完成 オーレギオン)	January 30, 2013
52	"The LBX of Hope"; Transliteration: "Kibō no LBX" (Japanese: 希望のLBX)	February 6, 2013
53	"Enter the Destiny Gate"; Transliteration: "Totsunyū Disutinī Gēto" (Japanese: 突入 ディスティニーゲート)	February 13, 2013
54	"The Secret of Mizell"; Transliteration: "Mizeru no Himitsu" (Japanese: ミゼルの秘密)	February 20, 2013
55	"The Birth of Two Powers"; Transliteration: "Tanjō 2tsu no Chikara" (Japanese: 誕生 2つの力)	February 27, 2013
56	"A Wicked Judge"; Transliteration: "Jaakunaru Shinpan" (Japanese: 邪悪なる審判)	March 6, 2013
57	"Final Play-Off in Tokio City"; Transliteration: "Saishū Kessen Tokio Shiti" (Japanese: 最終決戦トキオシティ)	March 13, 2013
58	"Forever LBX"; Transliteration: "LBX yo Eien ni" (Japanese: LBXよ 永遠に)	March 20, 2013

=== Inazuma Eleven Go vs. Little Battlers eXperience W The Movie (2012) ===
No.	Title	Original release date
1	"Inazuma Eleven Go vs. Danball Senki W Movie"; Transliteration: "Gekijouban Inazuma Eleven GO vs Danball Senki W" (Japanese: 劇場版 イナズマイレブンGO vs ダンボール戦機W)	December 1, 2012
A strange disturbance has combine 15 worlds together, including the world of LBX and Inazuma soccer. An all-star soccer match is about to take place between Inazuma Japan Legend and Shunsei Inazuma japan. The match progresses with Inazuma Japan Legend making amazing saves and unpredictable shots, but than a mysterious man named Asta attacks and uses some hissatsu techniques that have never before been seen. If that were not enough LBX's begin showing up all over the place and begin attacking the audience. Luckily the Duck Shuttle shows up. Ban, Hiro, Ran, Jin, Kazu, Ami, Asuka, Yuuya, and Jessica launch their LBX's and begin battling the enemies LBX's. A mysterious boy named San controls the LBX's, but he decides to save his wildcards for another day. Ban and Hiro communicate with Tenma and the other soccer players, and they come up with a plan to destroy the enemy LBX's. Once the enemy LBX's are destroyed another new girl appears. She casts some sort of spell that causes everyone in the world to start disappearing. Luckily Fei arrives in the Inazuma Bus and saves Shunsei Inazuma Japan. They follow the Duck Ship to the woods where they introduce themselves and quickly become friends. A little later on a scream is heard in the woods. Ban, Hiro, and Tenma rush to the scene where they save a girl named Fran from two LBX's. The group quickly begins to know Fran and thinks she is becoming their friend. It is all a setup though. Fran tries to make them all disappear in the night, but their hope and goals protect them. Fran realizes the only way to defeat them is by causing dissent within the ranks. Slowly dissent is caused. First Fran has a killer droid destroy Pandora and Achilles Deed, which causes Kazu and Ami to disappear. Then she plants evidence that will turn the two groups against each other. What she had not counted on was Shinsuke watching her planting the evidence in the tent in middle of the last night. He reveals this to everyone, and they turn against Fran. Fran summons Asta and San revealing that the three are the responsibles for what is happening right now, and the three challenge everyone to a soccer (against Asta) and LBX (against San) match at coordinates G223. Of course everyone rushes off to do the battle. Asta and San use techniques which cause the teams to turn against each other, but Ban, Hiro, and Tenma use their various speeches to again focus the group. Inazuma Japan ends up defeating Asta's The Destructchers 3–2, and Ban and his friends destroy all of San's LBX's. Fran goes ballistic when she sees her brothers lose and attacks both groups with her own LBX, Keshin Armed, Mixi Max and soccer special technique that erases everything. The groups unite to create God Hand W which engulfs Fran and turns her back into her light hearted good self. With Fran and her brothers defeated the worlds are restored to normal. The groups say goodbye before disappearing and go back to their worlds where they can once again enjoy soccer, LBX battles, and for Fran she can be reunited with her siblings and create a world full of flowers and joy.

=== Little Battlers eXperience Wars (2013) ===
Opening themes

- "Mugen Myself" by Little Blue boX (eps 1–21)
- "Eternal" by Little Blue boX (eps 22–37)

Ending themes

- "Kamisama Yāyāyā" by Dream5 (eps 1–21)
- "Bokutachi no Wars" by Ryota Ohsaka, Sayori Ishizuka, and Tomoaki Maeno (eps 22–36)
- "Hirameki" by Ryota Ohsaka (ep 37)

No.	Title	Original release date
1	"Arrival on the Battlefield"; Transliteration: "Senjou ni Orita Hi" (Japanese: 戦場に降りた日)	April 3, 2013
2	"Dreadful War Time"; Transliteration: "Kyoufu no War Time" (Japanese: 恐怖のウォータイム)	April 10, 2013
3	"The Violet Devil of Death"; Transliteration: "Shinigami Violet Devil" (Japanese: 死神バイオレットデビル)	April 17, 2013
4	"Entrusted New Weapons"; Transliteration: "Takusa Reta Shin Heiki" (Japanese: 託された新兵器)	April 24, 2013
5	"Trap at Black Wind Camp"; Transliteration: "Burakku Uindo Kyanpu no Wana" (Japanese: ブラックウィンドキャンプの罠)	May 1, 2013
6	"Formation Attack"; Transliteration: "Fōmēshon Atakku" (Japanese: フォーメーションアタック)	May 8, 2013
7	"The Fortified Tank, Eldband"; Transliteration: "Yōsai Sensha Erudobando" (Japanese: 要塞戦車エルドバンド)	May 15, 2013
8	"Deploy the Riding Armor"; Transliteration: "Shutsugeki: Riding Armor" (Japanese: 出撃 ライディングアーマー)	May 22, 2013
9	"LBX Graveyard"; Transliteration: "LBX no Hakaba" (Japanese: LBXの墓場)	May 29, 2013
10	"Large Droid Invades"; Transliteration: "Large Droid Shuurai" (Japanese: ラージドロイド襲来)	June 5, 2013
11	"Old Tales"; Transliteration: "Kataritsugareru Mono" (Japanese: 語りつがれるもの)	June 12, 2013
12	"Bandit, the Intruder"; Transliteration: "Rannyuusha Bandit" (Japanese: 乱入者バンデット)	June 19, 2013
13	"Where I Belong"; Transliteration: "Boku no Iru Basho" (Japanese: 僕のいる場所)	June 26, 2013
14	"Battle at Angel Piece"; Transliteration: "Angel Piece Kouryakusen" (Japanese: エンジェルピース攻略戦)	July 3, 2013
15	"Fated Showdown"; Transliteration: "Shukumei no Taiketsu" (Japanese: 宿命の対決)	July 10, 2013
16	"The Sleepy Giran Forest"; Transliteration: "Nemureru Mori Giran" (Japanese: 眠れる森ギラン)	July 17, 2013
17	"The Formless LBX"; Transliteration: "Sugatanaki LBX" (Japanese: 姿無きLBX)	July 24, 2013
18	"The Revealed Truth"; Transliteration: "Akasareta Shinjitsu" (Japanese: 明かされた真実)	July 31, 2013
19	"For the Sake of the World"; Transliteration: "Kono Sekai no Tame ni" (Japanese: この世界のために)	August 7, 2013
20	"Battle in the Death Forest"; Transliteration: "Death Forest no Tatakai" (Japanese: デスフォレストの戦い)	August 14, 2013
21	"Awakening! Overload"; Transliteration: "Kakusei: Overload" (Japanese: 覚醒 オーバーロード)	August 21, 2013
22	"新たなる機体"; Transliteration: "Aratanaru Kitai" (Japanese: 時計台の対決)	August 28, 2013
23	"Targeted Hikaru"; Transliteration: "Nerawareta Hikaru" (Japanese: 狙われたヒカル)	September 4, 2013
24	"Porton's Pride"; Transliteration: "Porton no Hokori" (Japanese: ポルトンの誇り)	September 11, 2013
25	"Road to Recovery"; Transliteration: "Fukkatsu e no Road" (Japanese: 復活への道(ロード))	September 18, 2013
26	"Doubt the Second World"; Transliteration: "Second World o Utagae" (Japanese: セカンドワールドを疑え)	October 9, 2013
27	"Resurrected Soldier"; Transliteration: "Yomigaeru Senshi" (Japanese: よみがえる戦士)	October 16, 2013
28	"Clash! Muraku vs. Kyouji"; Transliteration: "Gekitotsu: Muraku vs. Kyouji" (Japanese: 激突 ムラクVSキョウジ)	October 23, 2013
29	"Revival of the Violet Devil"; Transliteration: "Fukkatsu: Violet Devil" (Japanese: 復活 バイオレットデビル)	October 30, 2013
30	"Seledy's Identity"; Transliteration: "Seredy no Shoutai" (Japanese: セレディの正体)	November 6, 2013
31	"Our Own World Alliance"; Transliteration: "Oretachi no Sekai Rengou" (Japanese: 俺たちの世界連合)	November 13, 2013
32	"The Moment the World Changes"; Transliteration: "Sekai ga Kawaru Toki" (Japanese: 世界が変わる時)	November 20, 2013
33	"Arata's Decision"; Transliteration: "Arata no Ketsui" (Japanese: アラタの決意)	November 27, 2013
34	"True Battle"; Transliteration: "Hontou no Tatakai" (Japanese: 本当の戦い)	December 4, 2013
35	"Real Wars in the Box"; Transliteration: "Hako no Naka no Real Wars" (Japanese: 箱の中の戦争(リアルウォーズ))	December 11, 2013
36	"Final Battle"; Transliteration: "Saishuu Kessen" (Japanese: 最終決戦)	December 18, 2013
37	"To Our Future"; Transliteration: "Oretachi no Mirai e" (Japanese: 俺たちの未来へ)	December 25, 2013

=== Little Battlers eXperience Wars Special (2014) ===
No.	Title	Original release date
1	"All Star Battle"; Transliteration: "Ōru Sutā Batoru" (Japanese: スペシャルアニメ)	February 27, 2014
Sena Arata is left behind for failing to have the schools superintendent, Josephine Daimon, sign his permission form. However, he encounters a surprise. Leaving the ship is the legend himself, Yamano Ban, who has come to lecture and guide the school on LBX Technology. At a special assembly Ban explains why he has come only to have Arata ask Ban is he will hold a match with him. Ban agrees. What Ban does not tell him is that it will be a tag-team match. Ban (w/ Odin) teams up with Jin (w/ Zenon) and battles Arata (w/ Dot Blastizer) and Muraku Houjou (w/ Magna Orthus). Ban and Jin easily prevail over the two. Ban tells Arata the reason he lost is because he is not conversing with his LBX. Later Ban and Arata hold a rematch with Achilles and Achilles Deed. This time the two put up an even fight. Arata is able to communicate with Achilles Deed. In the end both use their hissatsu techniques (Lightning Lance & Cosmo Slash) and end the battle in a draw. After the battle Ban decides to go to Nation-A to continue learning more about LBX's when he graduates High School, and Arata is finally able to leave the island after getting his permission form signed.

=== LBX Girls (2021) ===
Opening theme

- "Dream hopper" by Rikako Aida

Ending theme

- "Compass Song" (コンパスソング, "Konpasu Songu") by Kano

No.	Title (Note: All English titles are taken from Funimation.)	Directed by (Note: Information is taken from the ending credits of each episode.)	Written by	Original release date
1	"The Day I Fell Into a Battlefield"; Transliteration: "Senjō ni Ochita Hi" (Japanese: 戦場に落ちた日)	Keitarō Motonaga	Yasuyuki Mutō	January 7, 2021
2	"Chosen Girls"; Transliteration: "Erabareshi Shōjotachi" (Japanese: 選ばれし少女たち)	Norihiko Nagahama	Yasuyuki Mutō	January 14, 2021
3	"The Battle of Gotenba"; Transliteration: "Gotenba Kōbō-sen" (Japanese: 御殿場攻防戦)	Makoto Sokuza	Yasuyuki Mutō	January 21, 2021
4	"The Legendary Super-Builder Otacross"; Transliteration: "Densetsu no Chō Birudā Otakurosu" (Japanese: 伝説の超ビルダーオタクロス)	Kaoru Yabana	Yasuyuki Mutō	January 28, 2021
5	"The Old Capital, Conquered"; Transliteration: "Shihaisareta Koto" (Japanese: 支配された古都)	Tsutomu Murakami; Kaoru Yabana	Yasuyuki Mutō	February 4, 2021
6	"Special Move: Attack Function"; Transliteration: "Hissatsu Atakku Fankushon" (Japanese: 必殺 アタックファンクション)	Keitarō Motonaga	Yasuyuki Mutō	February 11, 2021
7	"Suzuno's Secret"; Transliteration: "Suzuno no Himitsu" (Japanese: スズノの秘密)	Juria Matsumura	Yasuyuki Mutō	February 18, 2021
8	"The Terrifying Ammonite"; Transliteration: "Senritsu no Anmonaito" (Japanese: 戦慄のアンモナイト)	Naoki Murata	Yasuyuki Mutō	February 25, 2021
9	"The Battle at Kanmon Strait"; Transliteration: "Kanmonkaikyō no Gekitō" (Japanese: 関門海峡の激闘)	Naoki Murata	Yasuyuki Mutō	March 4, 2021
10	"For the Sake of this World?"; Transliteration: "Kono Sekai no Tame ni?" (Japanese: この世界のために？)	Keitarō Motonaga	Yasuyuki Mutō	March 11, 2021
11	"Interceptor Group Juggernaut"; Transliteration: "Yūgeki Shōtai Jagānōto" (Japanese: 遊撃小隊ジャガーノート)	Norihiko Nagahama	Yasuyuki Mutō	March 18, 2021
12	"Bonds That Save the World"; Transliteration: "Sekai o Sukuu Kizuna" (Japanese: 世界を救う絆)	Keitarō Motonaga	Yasuyuki Mutō	March 25, 2021

== English ==
=== LBX: Little Battlers eXperience (2014–16) ===
==== Season 1 (2014–15) ====
Ending theme

- "Battle On" by Mike Twining & Andrew Twining

No.	Title	Original release date
1	"Starting Small"	August 24, 2014
Van Yamano and his best friends, Amy Cohen and Kaz Walker, are competing in the Artemis Tournament, whose winner(s) will be hailed as the best LBX player(s) in the world. After pulling off a huge first round upset, Van thinks back to how this whole adventure started. Van's father, Prof. Jon Yamano, had invented the LBX, but had disappeared in an airline accident shortly after. In the present (relatively-speaking), Van regularly plays LBX battles at a local game shop, as doing so makes him feel closer to his father. However, his mother refuses to let him own one, seemingly blaming LBX for Jon's disappearance. After one such day, Van encounters a mysterious woman how a mysterious woman, who hands him a briefcase she says is from his father. She adds that he must keep it safe for the sake of the world, but, before she can explain more, she is forced to flee from a trio of black-suited figures. Back home, Van opens the suitcase to discover a brand new LBX, the AX-00. As he assembles it, the three aforementioned Agents track the AX-00 to Van's house. They deploy their own LBX, hoping to steal the Platinum Capsule concealed inside. Van is forced to fight them off in his own living room; while he successfully defeats the intruders, the room is completely trashed. His mother, who comes home after the battle, thinks that Van caused it while playing with LBX against her wishes, and orders him to clean up the mess. Episode 1 of Danball Senki.
2	"The Hunt Begins"	August 31, 2014
The next morning, Van's mother shocks him by reversing her long-standing rule, stating that he can play LBX on the condition that he becomes so good that no one can defeat him. Van takes the AX-00 to the game store, where the owner, Ken Navarro, offers him the new Achilles armor as a celebration gift. Unfortunately, local gang leader Hanz Gordon has already walked away with the Achilles armor, having used a fake purchase card to acquire it. Van and Amy begin planning a way to track down Hanz and get the armor back. Meanwhile, Damon Osgood, CEO of Tiny Orbit, is being taken to task during a board meeting; he had authorized the construction and shipment of a new, anonymously-sent LBX armor without clearing it with the board first. In response, he shows off the Achilles armor specs, arguing that, while they indeed come from an anonymous source, they are hardly the work of an amateur. The board are blown away by Achilles' specs, but maintain that Damon should have consulted them first. Soon after, Damon receives specs for a new LBX armor called Hunter, whose sole purpose is to assist Achilles. The accompanying email is signed, "From Jon". Later, after school, Van, Amy, and their friend Gabe Lewis find Hanz's three lieutenants, known as the Hands of Hanz. Gabe is defeated in the resulting LBX battle, but Kaz then steps in to save his friends. After defeating the Hands, Van, Kaz, and Amy follow them to their hideout, where they finally come face-to-face with Hanz. Episode 2 of Danball Senki.
3	"Enter the Destroyer"	September 7, 2014
Wanting to make it a fair fight, Hanz gives Van the Achilles armor to equip AX-00. However, Hanz warns in advance that, if Van loses, the newly-assembled Achilles will become part of Hanz's LBX collection. Van, Amy, and Kaz come up with a plan to attack Hanz's Destroyer; Amy will use Kunoichi's speed to distract Hanz, Kaz will attack with Trooper from long range, and Van will swoop in with Achilles whenever there is an opening. The plan seems to be working at first, but then Destroyer unleashes its Breath of Fire move, creating a smoke screen. Hanz follows this up by using the smoke as cover for his attacks, destroying Trooper and severely damaging Kunoichi and Achilles. However, just as it starts to look bleak, Achilles seems to start fighting back on its own, inspiring Van to keep going. Meanwhile, Kaz spots a weakness in the Breath of Fire attack; it uses so much power that it briefly shuts down all other systems, leaving Destroyer vulnerable for a few seconds. The team use both the weakness and Hanz's overconfidence to take out Destroyer's cannon, rendering Breath of Fire useless. Hanz fights back with Destroyer's brute strength, but is quickly defeated by Achilles. Hanz honors his word, allowing Van to keep Achilles; he is later seen reporting his failure to a man named Lex. The next day, while mourning the loss of Trooper, Kaz is tricked by a street vendor (soon revealed to be one of the Agents) into picking up an LBX called Pharaoh, which quickly brainwashes him. Kaz then confronts Van and Amy, challenging them to an LBX battle. Contains scenes from episodes 3 and 4 of Danball Senki.
4	"Revelations"	September 14, 2014
Now completely ruthless, the brainwashed Kaz has just one objective; destroy Achilles at all costs. But just when it looks like his goal will be achieved, Van's extroller begins to expand and indicates that "V Mode" has been activated. Achilles once again begins fighting back on its own, easily defeating Pharaoh, which returns Kaz to normal, albeit with no memory of what happened. The next day, the kids are approached by a man named Tyler Osgood, who takes them to the Blue Cats cafe, run by Len Hiyama. Tyler gives Kaz the Hunter LBX armor, which Kaz quickly assembles. Tyler then reveals some shocking news; Van's father is still alive, and is being held hostage by an organization called the New Dawn Raisers (NDR). The NDR have issued a challenge for Van to enter the upcoming Catacombs Contest; if Van wins, they will release his father. However, Tyler also tells Van about the Platinum Capsule hidden in Achilles, which the NDR are hoping to steal by defeating him. Van accepts, feeling he should take any chance to get his father back. Meanwhile, a boy named Justin is being questioned by his grandfather about his upcoming first day at school. Contains events from episodes 4, 5, and 7 of Danball Senki.
5	"A New Arrival"	September 21, 2014
The boy called Justin is dramatically dropped off at Van's school in a fighter jet piloted by his family butler. His full name is Justin Kaido, and he proceeds to blow everyone off when they try to talk to him. Back at the Blue Cats cafe, the group learn that the Catacombs Contest is a no-holds-barred, anything goes competition, and that the winner is automatically entered into the prestigious Artemis Tournament. They also learn that the NDR will likely send an agent to take out Van, but Van is still determined to save his father. Kaz and Amy also declare their intention to enter, not wanting to let Van fight on his own. Tyler then takes the kids through a secret passage underneath Blue Cats, which leads to the venue for the Catacombs Contest. There, they are surprised to see Justin among the LBX players practicing for the Contest; his LBX, named Emperor, has impressive speed, power, and agility, winning its three-on-one fight in 24.17 seconds. They also hear that Justin will be competing against them in the Catacombs Contest. With only a week before the Contest, Van and his friends head to the Navarros' store to train against Ken's Gladiator LBX. Six days later, following another training bout, the group is met by the Hands of Hanz, who tell them Hanz wants to see Van. En route, they are confronted by the Agents, who challenge Van to an LBX battle. Van easily defeats them with his new finisher, Thunderbolt Thrust. Afterwards, he demands to know where his father is. Episode 10 of Danball Senki,
6	"The Catacombs Contest"	September 28, 2014
Van is taken to a local arcade by the Hands of Hanz, where he sees that Han has lost an LBX battle to a rival gang leader named Dak Sendo. When Dak learns that Van has also defeated Hanz, he challenges him to an LBX battle. Van enters into the battle and quickly tries to win with the Thunderbolt Thrust. However Harlequin dodges the attack and starts to damage Achilles arm and leg. He then begins to use a special move which makes three Harlequins appear on the field. Unsure of if it's an illusion or if there are really three Van appears to be at the end of the battle. Eventually Justin intervenes and tells them to finish their battle at the Catacomb Contest since both are registered. Dak agrees and they leave. After Dak leaves Han provides him information on all the contestants in the upcoming Catacombs Contest. Van and his friends continue and finish their special training and arrive for the Catacombs Contest where they learn the legendary Lex is none other than Len. Round One of the Catacombs Contest begins with Van battling a fighter known as Gravedigger. Van appears to have the upper edge with his speed, but then Gravedigger pulls out a stun pellet, temporarily paralyzing Achilles. Contains scenes from episodes 11 and 12 of Danball Senki.
7	"Harlequin Unleashed"	October 5, 2014
While the stun is in effect, the Grave Digger takes off one of Achilles arms. When stun wears off Van uses his shield to block some missile attacks while building up momentum. It unlocks a new finishing move for his sword, the Spiral Slash. After unleashing Spiral Slash Grave Digger is defeated. Thanks to a double finish in the other Block A match Van moves on to the semifinal. In Black B Dak Sendou easily advances, in Block C Kaz advances, and in Block D Justin and Amy advance. The quarterfinals are held. Once again Dak and Kaz advance, setting up a Dak vs. Van semifinal, but Amy is shocked when Justin finishes her off in less than 3 seconds. To allow Achilles to continue to fight Hans lends Van his Destroyer's right arm. Van also decides to switch from the sword to the spear to try to keep Harlequin at bay. However the added wait slows down Achilles, making him more vulnerable. Harlequin gets his special attack off. Van surprisingly withstands it and gains the power to control V-Mode. With V-Mode he reverses the tide, revealing that Dak was actually controlling 3 Harlequins for his special attack. Episode 13 of DanbalL Senki.
8	"Showdown! The Emperor!"	October 12, 2014
Justin battles Kaz in the second semifinal. Hunter quickly puts ground between himself and the Emperor, but when the Emperor dodges his long range attacks he swiftly moves in on Hunter and defeats him in 9.9 seconds, setting up a final between Justin and Van. Before the match begins Justin reveals he is the N.D.R. agent and promises Van he will reveal his father's location if he loses the match. Achilles attacks the Emperor head on and does about a quarters worth of damage. When Van unleashes his V-Mode after a decoy Thunderstorm Thrust Justin decides to move The Emperor to full power. The Emperor does about 50% of damage to Achilles before unleashing his finisher, Explosion. Achilles hides under the ground to avoid most of the damage. After dodging the attack Achilles possesses strength equal to the Emperor. Justin enters commands faster than ever and eventually forces The Emperor into a system shutdown. Van advances to the Artemis Tournament as the last LBX standing. Justin gives Van the coordinates where his father is being held and then calls his grandfather. After the tourney Lex asks the kids to call him Lex. The mysterious woman returns and is revealed to be Rina Richardson, a scientist who worked side-by-side with Lex and Van's father. She has blueprints for the house Professor Yamano is being held out. Lex and Tyler decide to take the kids to the Tokyo LC and reveal what is beneath it to diagnose the hard drive Reyna has brought them. Contains events from episodes 14 and 15 of Danball Senki.
9	"Storming the Dark Fortress"	October 19, 2014
The house Professor Yamano is being held at ends up being the house of Cillian Kaido. The counter-terrorist group breaks into sets of 3 to infiltrate the house. Little do they know that there is some dissidence going on inside the N.D.R. The Agents are tasked with investigating Cillian Kaido by Devin. Specifically they are to see if he had anything to do with a bridge collapse 7 years earlier. Inside the house Van, Kaz, and Amy are about to be captured when Kaz decides to tackle them down a set of stairs. Instead of being captured they roll into a secret entrance into the bedroom of Justin Kaido. Justin challenges Van to a rematch with his new LBX, the Emperor Mark 2. When the Emperor Mark 2 and Achilles both use their finishers, they knock each other temporarily unconscious. Justin is shocked that he cannot seem to defeat Van, even with a new computer processor. Van and his friends are able to leave Justin's room and arrive at the room Professor Yamano is supposed to be held in. When they arrive Van calls out for his father, and instead of his father Cillian Kaido appears. Cillian says if the group can manage to defeat his LBX he will give up Professor Yamano once and for all. Contains events from episodes 15 and 16 of Danball Senki.
10	"A Fateful Reunion!"	October 26, 2014
Cillian's LBX Gekkōmaru quickly defeats Achilles, Hunter, and Kunomichi. Afterward Cillian has the other teams brought in and reveals they have also been captured. Finally he has Professor Yamano brought in. Professor Yamano is mad at Lex because he had told Lex not to come back. Tyler manages to slip his guard and takes Cillian hostage, or so he thinks. Reyna is then revealed to be a spy, as Killian is keeping a certain medical procedure that would save her sister from hitting the market. Just as Cillian is about to have everyone thrown into his personal prison, Professor Yamano laughs and reveals that even if Cillian has Achilles, it does him no good. The decoder has been hidden in the prize for the Artemis Tournament, and the only way to use its technology is to have both together at the same time. Professor Yamano then triggers some explosives hidden in Cillian's house, allowing the crew to escape. However Professor Yamano heads off in a different direction, saying he has some other business to take care of. After everything is finished Van is dropped off at home. Just before his mom can scold him he reveals his father is still alive, and Van's mom decides to reveal how she found out Professor Yamano was still alive years before. Van then vows to win Artemis at all costs. Episode 17 of Danball Senki.
11	"Artemis Begins!"	November 2, 2014
Van, Kaz, and Amy decide to enter Artemis as Team Yamano. Van gets a call from Lex, and Lex decides to teach Van a new finisher that should allow him to contend at Artemis. Lex also reveals that he and Hans will enter together as a Team at Artemis. At school it is revealed that Justin has been withdrawn from the class. Days pass, and Van and his friends make their way to Artemis. They are placed in C Block against the North American champions. Team Lex is placed in A-Block, where one of their opponents is none other than Justin. Overall 5 blocks are created, and the only way to become the best of the best is by winning your block and participating in the final Battle Royal. As the A-Block matches begin Lex debuts his undefeated LBX, G-Lex. Contains scenes from episodes 18 and 19 of Danball Senki.
12	"In Victory and Defeat"	November 9, 2014
Artemis begins with A-Block. Both Justin and Team Lex advance to the semi-finals with ease. They face each other in the semi-finals. At first Team Lex appears to have the advantage as G-Lex cancels out Groundbreaker with a single punch. However Destroyers sword gets blown apart and the G-Lex seems to hesitate, giving the Emperor an open shot and the win. Afterwards Lex is seen on the phone saying it is finished, almost as though he had planned something. Justin and the Emperor Mark 2 advance from A-Block. B-Block is then held, and the mysterious Phantom Fighter Masked J and his LBX Masquerade shock everyone with their speed and finesse. Van feels he recognizes Masked J from somewhere, but he cannot put his finger on it. Masked J advances to the finals from B Block. C-Block then begins. Van tries to wish the North American champs good luck in their upcoming match, but he gets brushed aside making Amy upset. Luckily the Asian Area Champions intervene and tell them to settle it in the battle box. Amy asks Kaz to take the match as she feels her strategy will get them the win. The match from episode 1 is replayed, and it's revealed to be Team Van's debut match in the Artemis Tourney. With Amy's strategy the American champs are upset and Team Van advances to the C-Block semi's. Contains events from episodes 19 and 20 of Danball Senki.
13	"The Vorpal Vortex!"	November 16, 2014
Block C's final features a showdown between the Asian Area Champions and Team Van. At first Team Van seems to have the upper hand as they have divided the Asian Area Champions apart. However the Asian Area champions have carefully srawn Team Van's members where they want them to be. They target Hunter, but Achilles and Kunoichi manage to make the save, suffering some damage in the process. Team Van comes up with a new plan. Hunter is able to take out two of the Asian champions members, but then Keita Morigami manages to take out Hunter and Kunoichi, leaving the match-up to be decided between his Gladiator and Van's Achilles. Achilles breaks out his new finisher, the Vorpal Vortex, and manages to advance. Up next we go through the entire D-block of the tournament. Dak Sendou and his Harlequin Mark 2 seem to have an overwhelming advantage until they make it to the final. Out of nowhere the mysterious Red Raven, a pupil of the legendary Otaku, defeats Dak and his team and advances to the Artemis Final. Episode 21 of Danball Senki,
14	"Battle Royale"	November 23, 2014
In Block E, the mysterious Nils Richter makes it to the final. Nils rarely speaks and asks like he is merely testing his subjects skills before finishing off the Oceania Champion to make the Battle Royale final. Justin thinks he knows Nils from somewhere, and when he goes to Nils waiting room to spy he sees Nils represents a company that has ties to the N.D.R. As the Battle Royale begins Nils reveals his clothing is actually a new designed controller that he's testing. The Battle Royale begins with Justin and Van targeting each other until Eugene, AKA Red Raven shots off his chargers and hits Achilles. Up next Masked J attacks Van, but while he's attacking he sends him a message on the controller saying you may need this. Nils goes into a new mode, PS mode, which seems to short out the controller. With his energy slash he takes out Masquerade and then begins beating on Birdbeak X eliminating both Phantom J and Eugene, the Red Raven. With the suit out of control Nils teammates are told to withdraw and run away. Now Van is left to face off with Justin and Nils, but should he team up with one of them to take out the other first? Contains scenes of episodes 22 and 23 of Danball Senki.
15	"Winner Takes All!"	December 7, 2014
When the Vtroller begins to take over Nils Richter, Justin and Van are forced to work together to fight his LBX. Van enters Vmode to gain the additional speed and Justin provides a smoke screen and long range attacks. Justin realizes he has seen Nils before at his grandfather's house and wonders what his ties are to the N.D.R. Once Nils is defeated the two call off their temporary truce. They use their finishers trying to gain the upper hand or to stop missiles, but in the end Groundbreaker, Thunderbolt Thrust, and Vorpal Vortex all fail. The two end up battling by the side of a volcano, and thanks to some fancy clips Achilles is able to get in close enough to jab The Emperor Mark 2 by his control panel and win the battle. After the battle ends Justin's Vtroller enters self destruct mode. The Emperor resurrects on his own and grabs Achilles before self destructing. Power is cut off to Artemis Stadium, and the special panel Achilles has had is stolen by an N.D.R. LBX. Even worse the N.D.R. gains control of the metanoa GX, meaning they can now manufacture the Infinity Engine in its entirety. When Devin learns what has happened, he confronts Cillian. Cillian says they can move on without Devin and fires him. Devin leaves, and some time passes before the door opens again. When the door opens Cillian is shocked by what he sees. Contains scenes from pisodes 23 and 24 of Danball Senki.
16	"A Glimmer of Hope."	December 14, 2014
Lex reveals the platinum capsule stolen was a fake and gives the real one to Van. It also has Justin leave his home and receive a new LBX. Finally, while on the way to Tiny Orbit, the N.D.R. attempts to kidnap Van so they can gain possession of the platinum capsule. Van and his friends are saved by a mysterious LBX that seems to hesitate for 5 seconds every 5 1/2 minutes. Thanks to the mysterious LBX the kidnapping is thwarted and Van and his friends are able to arrive at Tiny Orbit. Contains events from episodes 25 and 26 of Danball Senki.
17	"Changing of the Guard"	December 21, 2014
Tyler arrives at Tiny Orbit where he plans to try and decode the platinum capsule. The owner of Tiny Orbit comes down and confronts Tyler about it. His name is Damon Osgood, Tyler's older brother. After revealing he just wants to stop the N.D.R. at all costs Amy decides to reveal she knows the mysterious LBX came from Damon. At first Damon tries to hide the fact, but when Amy calls him out because Tiny Orbit is the only company with spark bed technology Damon finally reveals the mysterious LBX. Its name is Pandora. While trying to decode the platinum capsule Damon comes across blue prints for a new LBX named Odin. It shows that Odin's blue prints have a spot inside him where they can hide the platinum capsule. The program was downloaded to Van a mere 72 hours and is signed by Phantom J. Damon reveals that Phantom J is none other than Professor Yamano. Shortly after the power to Tiny Orbit is cut off and 3 N.D.R. LBX's infiltrate Tiny Orbit. Kaz and Amy attempt to stop them, resulting in Kunoichi's destruction. Damon sends Amy the download program for Pandora, making Pandora her new LBX, and Pandora and Hunter are able to defeat the N.D.R. LBX's. After the events at Tiny Orbit are completed Reyna Richardson turns on the N.D.R. for not keeping their promise and shoots Cillian. Cillian then reawakens with red eyes, though Reyna does not know he is still alive. Episode 27 of Danball Senki.
18	"Odin's Assault"	January 4, 2015
Devin and The Agents infiltrate the N.D.R. with the intention of stealing their stealth jet. Devin gets captured but is freed by Justin. On his way to the jet he runs into Reyna and decides to take her with him. At Tiny Orbit construction on Odin is completed. Before Odin can be completed a train is hijacked and set spiraling toward Tiny Orbit. Most of Tiny Orbit is evacuated, but Damon and Tyler decide to make one last ditch effort to stop the train with Odin. Odin transforms into his fighter jet mode and flies into the train. When he arrives in the engine room a N.D.R. LBX awaits him. Odin is able to defeat the enemy with the help of a smoke screen and his finisher, but when he tries to engage the breaks he learns the power to them has been cut. The train headquarters tells Tiny Orbit how to manually engage the brakes. Odin does so, but the train still has too much speed. Justin arrives at Tiny Orbit and uses his new LBX, Proto Zenon, to force the train to stop before it can run into Tiny Orbit. The N.D.R. is forced to withdraw and Justin reveals he has turned against the N.D.R. Episode 28 of Danball Senki.
19	"The Legendary Hacker"	January 4, 2015
Van, Amy, Kaz, and Hans head to Electronica City looking for the Legendary Hacker Otaku. Dak is also in Electronica looking for Eugene, AKA Red Raven. Just as Van and company begin to feel depressed and think about leaving, Otaku appears on the video board and gives them a challenge. They can find him if they win the legendary LBX. First they must solve a riddle to find the legendary LBX. The riddle leads the crew to Electronica Tower. Hanz stays behind to battle Dak while Van and the others advance into the battle room where they meet the Otaku Rangers- Blue Raven, Yellow Raven, Pink Raven, Black Raven, and Eugene (Red Raven). In order to win the legendary LBX, Amy must defeat Yellow Raven. Hamz gets a surprising win over Dak and forces him to become part of his crew. Meanwhile Amy defeats Yellow Raven to win the Legendary LBX. The Otaku Rangers show everyone where they can meet Otaku. Otaku thanks them for winning the legendary LBX and defeating his Otaku Rangers, but before he will help them they must defeat his LBX in battle. Otaku controls three LBX at once, so Van, Amy, and Kaz agree to fight. Otaku ends up combining his three LBX into one, and Kaz sacrifices Hunter to stop Otaku's final attack and keep Amy and Van in the contest. Episode 29 of Danball Senki,
20	"Breaching the Gate"	January 11, 2015
Hunter's attack does damage to Otaku's LBX chest and allows Odin to finish it with Gungir Blast. Otaku has the crew scan two of their LBX's to enter the cyber net. Hunter and Odin enter and are able to make it to the Metanoa GX. Once there, they face the cyber LBX Hades. Hunter is quickly destroyed, but a new cyber LBX arrives with the voice of Professor Yamano telling Kaz it is now his. The cyber LBX is the successor to Hunter, Fenrir. Fenrir quickly destroys Hades, so the N.D.R. decides to destroy the Metanoa GX. Luckily Otaku has planned some back-up measures. He contacts the Hacker Corps, who come and help him regather the data. 99% of the data is recovered. However the last 1% of the data is inside a cyber storm and risks being destroyed. Elsewhere, the Agents get the Eclipse's cloaking mechanism working. Devin reveals that the N.D.R. will likely think he is the one who killed Cillian and sends Rina back to be with her sister. While Rina is watching the TV, she is shocked to see Cillian is still alive. Contains events from episodes 30, 31, and 35 of Danball Senki.
21	"The Infinity Engine!"	January 11, 2015
Bobcat inputs his own LBX into the cyber net and creates a storm around it. With the disturbance he is able to get into the center of the cyber storm. Bobcat then has Red Ribbon blast a hole in the storm and throws the data out of the storm, finishing the metanoa GX blueprints. As Tyler, Van, and company head back to Tiny Orbit they find themselves surrounded by N.D.R. agents. Devin and The agents make the save and convince Tyler they have left the N.D.R. Everyone returns to Tiny Orbit where Damon reveals that the N.D.R. plans on going after a power plant that provides 80% of the worlds power. The only way to stop the N.D.R. should they take control of that plant it with The Infinity Engine. Work begins immediately on The Infinity Engine. Things are looking up when Otaku contacts them. He reveals the N.D.R. has learned about the service tunnels under Tiny Orbit and they have sent an army of 25,000 LBX to Tiny Orbit to steal The Infinity Engine. Teams are made to stop the LBX invasion. Hans is to work with Bobcat and the Hacker Corps, who have sent LBX to help over the cyber net. Van, Amy, and Kaz go to guard the elevator shaft, and Devin and the Agents are sent to guard the fourth floor. Little down they know that Kohl Industries is making back-up plans in case the invasion fails, Justin has gained enough data to allow Proto Zenon to evolve into his complete form, and Dak has gained a new LBX. Contains events from episodes 36 and 37 of Danball Senki.
22	"Hold the Line!"	January 18, 2015
Behind all the LBX's the N.D.R. brings out a remote controlled tank. Justin arrives with Zenon, and the teams are redrawn. Hans, Amy, and Kaz are sent to join Devin and The Agents at the Lab while Justin, Van, and the Hacker Corps attack the tank. Justin causes a smoke screen allowing Zenon and Odin to get close. The hacker corps then continues to create smoke, causing the tank to fire random shots, taking out most of their LBX. On top of the tank Odin provides cover for Zenon while Zenon hacks into the tanks system and shuts it down. After the battle the friends start to meet up, and the Infinity Engine prototype is completed. A man named Howard though sneaks inside Tiny Orbit and steals the Infinity Engine. Damon chases Howard only to watch Howard get attacked by a N.D.R. agent. The N.D.R. agent then has a van try to run down Howard, but Damon pushes him to safety and sacrifices his life in the process. The bad news- Van and Justin see it all, and it sends Van into a state of depression. The next day Tyler reforms the C.I.O. and makes Devin and the Agents (Eenie, Meanie, and Minie) into members. The come up with a plan to protect the power stations systems with the stealth jet and the C.I.O.'s LBX's. Hans recruits Dak to join them at protecting the station, and Justin decides to leave his grandfather and join the C.I.O. At the same time he gains proof that his grandfather has been killed and is now being controlled by some sort of Terminator Android. The N.D.R. decides to counter to by bringing in their own wildcard, one Curtis Kohl, the Artemis 1 champion. Episode 38 of Danball Senki.
23	"A Sense of Purpose"	January 18, 2015
Kaz and Amy are followed by the N.D.R. black-ops team, but Devin sets up a trap that allows him to reveal he has turned against the N.D.R. At Van's house Justin arrives to talk one-on-one with Van. He reminds Van that the only true way they lose is by giving up and letting themselves be destroyed. Van finally agrees to return to Tiny Orbit and join the fight against the N.D.R. once more. At Tiny Orbit Van receives a message from Lex telling him where the N.D.R. final base is at. Eenie also finds a countdown clock at the base which reveals when the N.D.R. is going to attack the power plant. Everyone finds out the N.D.R. has created a group of LBX's that are self intelligent and self learning. The entire project is called Project Saturn. Van, Kaz, Amy and a couple of others infiltrate the base with less than an hour remaining hoping to shut the N.D.R. plan down for good, but instead they find one of the Fairies has been activated and is serving as security for the base. Contains events from episodes 39, 40, and 41 of Danball Senki.
24	"The Final Mission"	January 25, 2015
Van and his friends continue to face off against the Angel. Amy realizes it has a flaw. When it cloaks itself, you can still see the shadow on the ground. With this knowledge the group is able to use their LBX's to eliminate it. The group enters the control room to shut down Saturn but instead get sealed inside the control room and lose all access to communicate with the outside. Lex comes on the video board and reveals he has been playing them the entire time. He wants to send the entire world back to the dark ages by attacking N City and the world leaders conference that is taking place there. Lex also reveals he is controlling the robot that has replaced Cillian Kaido. Professor Yamano and Devin are able to enter hack into the bases controls and enter the control room, freeing everyone in there. The entire team boards the stealth jet and take off trying to catch Saturn. Their speed projects they will catch them in one hour, so they come up with a plan to use jet packs on their LBX to board Saturn and take out its defense system. Once that is done they can board Saturn and stop it manually. The team is able to do so, losing some drone LBX in the process. Van and Justin make their way to the control room, but before they can shut down the system they are intercepted by Kurtis Kole. Contains scenes from episodes 41 and 42 of Danball Senki.
25	"A Race Against Time"	January 25, 2015
Van and Justin battles Kurtis Kole. Van and Justin unleash their LBX hidden extreme mode, but Kole counters with Seraphic mode. When Odin & Zenon dodge Kole's attack with his shield, they are able to unleash their finishing moves. Saturn's shield is disabled, but Lex counters by putting up a magnetic shield to disable to spark box technology. Devin decides they'll board the ship manually and asks the kids to stay behind, but they refuse. Professor Yamano agrees and asks them to split into groups of 2 to 3 to split up the ships defenses. The kids recover their LBX, but only Justin and Van are able to move ahead. It is revealed the only way Saturn can be stopped is by hitting the self destruct button. The group is forced to split even further when Cillian intercepts Justin, and Van makes it to the control panel only to find out he must defeat Lex. Episode 43 of Danball Senki.
26	"A New Dawn Rises"	February 8, 2015
The final showdown is at hand as Van battles Lex. Both have grown tremendously and know each other's skills. However Lex has a new LBX, Ifrit, which is programmed with Lex's hatred and can enter the dangerous inferno mode. If Van can succeed at defeating Ifrit, he will be able to install the self destruct program that will send Saturn to its doom. if he should fail then Lex will be able to destroy City once and for all, along with the worlds political leaders. Even if the self destruct should go off, will either Lex or Van be able to survive the trek back to the stealth jet? A new dawn is about to rise, and the main question is which side will do the prevailing? Episode 44 of Danball Senki.

==== Season 2 (2015–16) ====
Ending theme

- "Save the World" by Mike Twining & Andrew Twining

No. overall	No. in season	Title	Original release date
27	1	"LBX Uprising"	October 18, 2015
One year has passed since the New Dawn Raisers were defeated. LBX battles can now been seen all across the city, and Van has been invited to Tiny Orbit's new product reveal at the Tokyo CT Center. Nearby, one Hiro Hughes competes in the LBX arcade game, racking up 20 consecutive victories to win a rare Super-Duper Man action figure. After bumping into a mysterious man on the way out, Hiro opens the box, but finds an LBX Odysseus instead of Super-Duper Man. Hiro, who has never used LBX before, nearly hits a passing Van while practicing. Van is intrigued by Odysseus, having never seen it before. He then teaches Hiro how to use it, before realizing he is late for the event. At the product reveal, which Van gets to just in time, Tyler Osgood unveils a new Achilles model known as Achilles Fiend. After the presentation, Achilles Fiend gets hacked, and all unmanned LBX across the city begin attacking. Amy, Van, and Kaz attempt to stop them, but Fenrir and Pandora are destroyed, while Kaz and Amy become incapacitated by knock-out gas. Hiro arrives, having received some kind of vision, and attempts to assist Van. The mysterious man returns, and gives Van a D-Chip Hologram to battle Achilles Fiend in so people can escape from the Center. However, Odin and Odysseus are unable to match Achilles Fiend's speed, leading to Achilles Fiend destroying Odin with its Dark Storm finisher. After the battle, the mysterious man reveals to Van, Hiro, and Tyler that a new enemy has arisen. Before he can explain further, a masked man appears on all television and electronic screens across the city. The man identifies himself as part of a new group called The Directors, who plan to control the planet by any means necessary. Episode 1 of Danball Senki W.
28	2	"Double Offense"	October 18, 2015
The mysterious man introduces himself as Cobra, an agent sent by Professor Yamano to help Hiro and Van against the Directors. Revealing that the Directors are kidnapping the world's strongest LBX players, Cobra gives Van a new LBX, Elysion, to fight them. As Van assembles Elysion, Cobra discovers that the hacked computer being controlled by the Directors is the old CIO base, inside the CT Center. Tyler tell Van and Hiro how to get into the base, with the two battling multiple hacked LBX on the way. Finally, they face two G-Lex LBX, plus Achilles Fiend, all of whom are guarding the hijacked computer. A mysterious youth arrives, and uses a highly-customized Deqoo to destroy the two G-Lexes. Achilles Fiend retreats, and Elysion shuts down the computer. As Van goes to thank the mysterious youth, the youth reveals he is not there to help. Instead, he is there to defeat Van, and he'll defeat all enemies who get in the way of that goal. The youth introduces himself as Kurt Bryant, but before they can battle, he senses Tyler and Cobra coming and decides to flee. Meanwhile, Prime Minister Vanguard tasks Devin with investigating the Directors. Across the sea, President Claudia Lenton of the AU asks Vice President Alfred Gordon and NICS head Owen Kaios to devise countermeasures to the LBX crisis. Gordon chooses to investigate Crystogram Corporation, while Owen puts the NICS on full alert. Contains scenes from episodes 2 and 3 of Danball Senki W.
29	3	"Three's a Crowd"	October 25, 2015
While Tyler contacts Rina to revive the CIO, Cobra reveals all he knows about the Directors, which is not very much. He reveals that the LBX are being taken over through a process called brainjacking; this brainjacking occurs through the M Chip, which all LBX are required to have by the ILBXF. However, Professor Yamano has secretly built Perseus and Elysion without M Chips. He also reveals that a third LBX from Professor Yamano will be presented to the winner of the Shibuya Town Martial Arts tournament that afternoon. Over in Shibuya, Laura Hanasaki wins the martial arts tournament and is presented with Minerva, that third LBX. While having a celebratory battle with her friend Yuki, Laura is attacked by Director LBX. Minerva and Warrior, Yuki's LBX, are able to handle most of them, but then Warrior gets brainjacked. Minerva is forced to take out Warrior, but is then surrounded by Achilles Fiend, a black Kunoichi, and a black Hunter. Van and Hiro arrive, helping Laura take out Kunoichi and Hunter, but Achilles Fiend escapes. After explaining the situation, Laura is made a member of the team, and all three are taken to the CIO base. Meanwhile, Tyler contacts Devin and the Mos, asking them to investigate the International LBX Federation (ILBXF). At the CIO base, Keith Young manages to detect the signals from Amy and Kaz's extrollers. They seem to be on a plane headed to the AU, but before precise coordinates can be determined, the signals cut out. Van and company decide to head to the AU to investigate. Contains scenes from episodes 3 and 4 of Danball Senki W.
30	4	"On the Move"	November 1, 2015
En route to the AU, the team's plane is high-jacked by the Directors' LBX, forcing Van, Hiro, and Laura to fight a series of battles against them without damaging the plane. Eventually, they succeed, and the plane continues on course. On arrival in L-City, Van is challenged by a brash young girl to battle her LBX, Jeanne D'Arc. After the battle ends in a draw, the girl introduces herself as Jessica Kaios = Owen's daughter, also known as Jess - and reveals she was testing Van's skill before fulfilling her assignment; taking the team to see her father. At the NICS base, the team have their extrollers modified, allowing them to locate the control computers responsible for brainjacking. Soon after, all the LBX in L-City are brainjacked by the Directors. Contains scenes from episodes 4 and 5 of Danball Senki W.
31	5	"Trained Heroes"	November 8, 2015
With L-City under attack, the team is divided in two to track down the control computer. Hiro and Jess track it to a subway car, only to encounter a brainwashed Kurtis Kole, who challenges them to a fight. The two manage to defeat Kole and purge the computer, only for the subway car to restart, on course for a high-speed collision with a stationary train. Just when all seems hopeless, an unknown LBX manages to stop the car with synthetic webbing. The team discover that the LBX, named Triton, is controlled by Justin Kaido, who reveals he's been recruited to join them. Justin's recruiter then reveals himself; Mongoose, a fellow agent of Cobra's. The two spies seem to hold each other in utter contempt, perfectly reflecting their code names. Contains scenes from episodes 5 and 6 of Danball Senki W.
32	6	"Shangpei Showdown"	November 15, 2015
NICS brings Master Otaku on board to track down the infected supercomputers. His trace points the team towards Shangpei, where they head using the NICS's Duck Shuttle. After Van tests the new LBX surf sled, Master Otaku uses the data it collected to determine that the infected computer is at one of two locations; Dragon Tower, or the Shangpei Port Management Hub. The team divides in two, with Van, Laura, and Master Otaku heading to Dragon Tower, and Justin, Hiro, and Jess checking out the Port. At Dragon Tower, Van's group gets ambushed by rogue LBX, where Master Otaku wrenches his back while showing off. Laura eventually makes it up to the top of the tower, where she is met by a brainwashed slave driver in a panda suit. Laura is defeated, but Van and the injured Master Otaku make it in time to save her LBX. The slave driver then reveals herself to be Amy, to the shock of both Van and Master Otaku. Meanwhile, Justin's group are diverted from the Port to assist, but are intercepted on the first floor, leaving Van and Master Otaku to take on Amy by themselves. Contains scenes from episodes 6 and 7 of Danball Senki W.
33	7	"Plan of Attack"	November 22, 2015
Amy battles Van and Master Otaku in an all or nothing slugfest. Amy's speed seems to be too much for Van and Master Otaku to handle, until Master Otaku's Perfect ZX-3 unleashes its Mega Thunder Cross, destroying Amy's LBX and freeing her from the Directors' control. Van then purges the supercomputer, disabling the LBX Justin's group are fighting. Amy does not remember anything useful, but is determined to stay and help free Kaz. However, her severe exhaustion from being controlled means she has to sit things out for the moment. While Amy is looked after by the CIO, Tyler announces he'll be joining the team from here on out. However, he also brings with him a surprise; Nils Richter, now fully recovered from the events of the last season. Tyler reveals he was forced out of his company, and wants to help NICS investigate Crystogram behind the scenes. But first, they decide to analyze the new data they received from Shangpei, letting the kids leave early to bond with Nils. Meanwhile, Devin Aeron recalls how Prime Minister Vanguard gave him a second chance. The next day, NICS comes to the conclusion that the ILBXF needs to be investigated; on arrival in L-City, the team divides in two, with Van, Justin, Nils, and Tyler tasked with infiltrating the ILBXF. Contains scenes from episodes 8 and 9 of Danball Senki W.
34	8	"In Plain Sight"	November 29, 2015
Van's group begin investigating the ILBXF via a company tour, but are unaware that they're being monitored by Kurt Bryant, who is more than eager to battle them. All three make it to the secure areas, where they plan to send their LBX through air ducts to find the main computer. However, Kurt intercepts Nils, while Van gets trapped in the bathroom and has to alter the infiltration route. Justin and Van are then caught by government officials, who also stop the fight between Nils and Kurt. They announce that the ILBXF is being locked down, forcing everyone to leave the premises; Vice President Gordon then appears, and advises Van, Justin, and Nils to forget any of this ever happened. Before they leave L-City, Alan Worthing, President of the ILBXF, calls Tyler and invites him to a meeting. When confronted by the allegations, Worthing invites the group to see for themselves. Instead of the main computer, they find a production line for M Chips; the group is forced to admit defeat. Back at NICS, it's discovered that the Directors' next plan is to sabotage President Lenton's speech at Peace Memorial Park, marking her first full year in office. It turns out President Lenton's speech is taking place on the same day as this year's Artemis Tournament, held on nearby Aloha Island, which suggests the Directors might base themselves there. As the previous year's finalists, Van, Justin, and Nils are already qualified to enter; and, as teams of up to three players are accepted, the others can sign on as their teammates without having to qualify themselves. Meanwhile, Owen says he'll try to persuade President Lenton to postpone her speech until after the tournament. Contains scenes from episodes 9, 11, and 12 of Danball Senki W.
35	9	"Artemis, Round One!"	December 6, 2015
With President Lenton refusing to reschedule her speech, the team heads for Aloha Island and the Artemis Tournament. Shortly after arriving, they run into Hanz and Dak, quickly bringing them up to speed. Hanz and Dak agree to join the search. The next morning, the group register and the teams are formed; Van, Justin, and Jess form one team, while Hiro, Nils, and Laura form the other. At registration, they encounter a young participant named Asuka Carter, who appears to be an uncouth, loudmouth boy. Asuka's extroller is missing, leading a frustrated Asuka to accuse Van of stealing it. However, Jess notices that it's in Asuka's back pocket. Relieved and grateful (though unapologetic), Asuka tags along with the group, despite never being invited to. In addition, the group meets Eugene again, now heading a new team called Otaku Rangers Z. Finally, the tournament begins, and a huge shock occurs as Asuka's custom LBX, Werecat, wins A Block solo without using a single special move. Episode 16 of Danball Senki W.
36	10	"I Spy With My Little Eye"	December 13, 2015
In B Block's final match, the Alexander Sisters, South America's LBX champions, use their speed and teamwork to clinch the win. Hanz and Dak have an equally smooth run in C Block, securing their place in the final. There, they face off against a participant known only as Jackal, and his LBX Chameleon. Hanz and Dak try to eliminate Chameleon quickly, but Chameleon is persistent and proceeds to dodge every attack. Meanwhile, Van and the others search the stadium for mysterious EM waves, as well as the Directors' agent, but do not find any until the President's speech begins. At that moment, EM wave readings appear all around the stadium. Jackal, who is really the Directors' agent, activates Hitman, an LBX already in place at Peace Memorial Park, then uses his extroller to activate Router LBX that have been placed across the ocean to boost his signal. Master Otaku finds wave readings emanating from the ocean, 800m and 1600m from the stadium. Realizing this must be a relay system, Van and Hiro board their surf sleds to go and investigate the 800m contact. They manage to find and take out the Router LBX, but a new reading pops up at 850m; Jackal had a backup plan in case the first failed. Meanwhile, Asuka realizes that Jackal's control inputs do not match up with Chameleon's movements. Using Werecat's camera mode to zoom in, Asuka sees that Jackal is targeting President Lenton via his extroller. Contains scenes from episodes 17 and 18 of Danball Senki W.
37	11	"Artemis Showdown!"	December 20, 2015
Van and Hiro get ambushed at the 850m contact, but they are saved by Achilles Deed, allowing them to destroy the backup router, which disables Hitman and saves President Lenton. Meanwhile, Hanz and Dak realize Chameleon is running on an auto program, and use this knowledge to finally take it out. With the plan foiled, and eliminated from the tournament, Jackal decides to retreat. But before he can leave the stadium, Asuka intercepts him and beats him in an LBX battle, allowing NICS to arrive and take Jackal into custody. With the President safe, the group returns to focus on Artemis. Otaku Rangers Z win D Block, and both Van and Hiro's teams make it to the final of E Block. However, an unexpected result occurs when both teams eliminate each other simultaneously. Initially, both are disqualified as per the rules, but cheers from the crowd convince the tournament organizers to reverse the decision and advance both teams. Contains scenes from episodes 18 and 19 of Danball Senki W.
38	12	"Artemis Battle Royale!"	February 28, 2016
The Artemis Finals features a 6-player battle royale between Van, Hiro, Asuka, Dak, Jasmine Alexander, and Goldfinch from Otaku Rangers Z. By the end, Van and Hiro take on Asuka's Werecat together, but Asuka defeats them simultaneously after a hard fight. At the victory ceremony, Asuka reveals herself to be a girl, much to the team's surprise. Meanwhile, Kurt is being tested by a mysterious man in bandages, who is putting Kurt up against his deadly new creation - the Slayer Droid. Contains scenes from episodes 20 and 21 of Danball Senki W.
39	13	"Special Assignment"	March 6, 2016
Professor Yamano contacts NICS and asks them to send the kids to his hidden lab in Albion. By pure coincidence, Hiro's mother also lives in Albion. The group arrives in Albion, where Professor Yamano offers to turn Elysion, Odysseus, and Minerva into Super LBX, as well as upgrading Triton, Jeanne D'Arc, and Liu Bei. But before the customization can begin, a brainjacking occurs in Albion. The group splits into two, each taking a different subway train; however, the train carrying Van, Justin, and Laura stops when its power cuts out, leaving Hiro, Jess, and Nils to go it alone. Before they can make it to the control computer, Kurt intercepts them and forces them into battle. Meanwhile, on the roof, Achilles Fiend is watching, but it gets attacked by Slayer Droid, and is forced to retreat. Van's train restarts, but the group arrives too late to intervene in the battle. Hiro's group defeats Kurt, only for Slayer Droid to jump in, delaying their attempt to reach the control computer. Meanwhile, Alan Worthing and the mysterious man in bandages watch the action via viewscreen. Contains scenes from episodes 22 and 23 of Danball Senki W.
40	14	"A Trapped trap"	March 13, 2016
41	15	"The Playmaker"	March 20, 2016
42	16	"Straight to the Point"	March 27, 2016
43	17	"The Director"	April 3, 2016
44	18	"Operation: Covert Rescue"	April 10, 2016
45	19	"Ghost From the Past"	April 17, 2016
46	20	"Conflict in the Canyon"	April 24, 2016
47	21	"Achilles Heel"	May 1, 2016
48	22	"Access Denied"	May 8, 2016
49	23	"Locked on Target"	May 15, 2016
50	24	"The Heart of Evil"	May 22, 2016
51	25	"No Room for Error"	May 22, 2016
52	26	"Fall of Eden"	May 29, 2016
Contains scenes from 41 of Danball Senki W. Episodes 42-58 of W were never edited or dubbed.
