= Strangers (2018 TV series) =

British television crime drama series

- Genre: Crime drama
- Created by: Mark Denton; Jonny Stockwood
- Written by: Mark Denton; Jonny Stockwood; Marston Bloom; Adam Gyngell; Fred Armesto; Harry Williams; Jack Williams
- Directed by: Paul Andrew Williams
- Starring: John Simm; Anthony Wong; Emilia Fox; Katie Leung; Tom Wu; Anthony Hayes; Dervla Kirwan; Tim McInnerny; Raquel Cassidy
- Composer: Raffertie
- Country of origin: United Kingdom
- Original language: English
- No. of series: 1
- No. of episodes: 8 (list of episodes)

Production
- Executive producers: Harry Williams; Jack Williams; Paul Andrew Williams; John Simm; Mark Denton; Jonny Stockwood
- Producer: Matthew Bird
- Cinematography: Eben Bolter
- Editors: Liana Del Giudice; Charlene Short
- Running time: 44 minutes
- Production company: Two Brothers Pictures

Original release
- Network: ITV
- Release: 10 September – 29 October 2018

Strangers is a British television crime drama series, principally written and created by Mark Denton and Jonny Stockwood, that was first broadcast on ITV on 10 September 2018. Originally titled White Dragon, the series was principally filmed in Hong Kong and is notable for featuring the first English-speaking role for Hong Kong actor Anthony Wong.

Aside from Wong, John Simm stars as the principal character, Professor Jonah Mulray, alongside Dervla Kirwan as his wife Megan; Emilia Fox as Sally Porter, the second British Secretary; Katie Leung as Lau Chen, David and Megan's daughter; and Tom Wu as Daniel Tsui, a senior detective working for the Hong Kong police. Prior to the television premiere, the first episode was made available to watch four days early on both the ITV Hub and STV Player as a "Player Première".

== Plot ==
Professor Jonah Mulray's life is turned upside-down when his wife, Megan (Dervla Kirwan), is killed in a car crash in Hong Kong. Although she lived and worked there half her life, Jonah has never been. He lives a small, sheltered life, and his fear of flying has kept him in London. But now he has no choice but to travel to the other side of the world to identify the body of the woman he loved.

Not long after arriving in Hong Kong, Jonah makes a shocking discovery about his wife. Jonah is drawn deeper and deeper into a web of conspiracy as he comes to terms with this utterly alien and unfamiliar environment, battling to uncover the truth about his wife's death.

== Cast ==
- John Simm as Professor Jonah Dougal Mulray
- Anthony Wong as David Chen
- Emilia Fox as Sally Porter
- Katie Leung as Lau Chen
- Anthony Hayes as Michael Cohen
- Tom Wu as Detective Inspector Daniel Tsui
- Dervla Kirwan as Megan Emilia Harris
- Tim McInnerny as Arthur Bach
- Raquel Cassidy as Rachel Hargreaves
- Thomas Chaanhing as Detective Inspector Felix Chong
- Kenneth Tsang as Xiadong Xo
- Christophe Tek as Detective Wilfred Chow
- Jason Wong as Kai Huang
- Ryan McKen as Faraz Reza
- Kae Alexander as Becky
- Andrew Knott as Conrad Davies
- Rosalind Halstead as Emma
- Orion Lee as Allen Ma
- Stuart Ong as Shibao
- Dave Wong as Robin Liu
- Peter Lau as Choi Huang, Kai Huang's Father

== Production ==
Harry and Jack Williams, principally known for mystery drama series The Missing, were executive producers of the series, as well as contributing to the script. Paul Andrew Williams was the sole director for all eight episodes.

== Episodes ==
No.	Title	Directed by	Written by	Original release date	Viewers (millions)
1	"Episode 1"	Paul Andrew Williams	Mark Denton & Jonny Stockwood	6 September 2018 (ITV Hub); 10 September 2018 (ITV)	7.22
University lecturer Professor Jonah Mulray is heartbroken when the police arrive at his place of work to inform him that his wife, Megan, has been killed in a car crash in Hong Kong. Determined to find out what happened in her final hours, Jonah flies to Hong Kong only to be confronted by the revelation that Megan had a second husband, former cop David Chen.
2	"Episode 2"	Paul Andrew Williams	Mark Denton & Jonny Stockwood	17 September 2018	6.36
Jonah confronts the police with evidence confirming that Megan was murdered - namely a phone message which features an audible gunshot. But after having his phone taken into custody as evidence, Jonah discovers the message has been edited. When Megan's corpse later disappears from the morgue, Jonah fears he may be caught in the middle of a conspiracy.
3	"Episode 3"	Paul Andrew Williams	Mark Denton & Jonny Stockwood	24 September 2018	6.36
David admits to knowing that Megan was murdered, having seen the bullet wound on her corpse. Jonah discovers photos on Megan's laptop which leads him and David to a local recycling centre, where they steal a hard drive containing footage of the man driving the truck that ploughed into Megan. Jonah also finds false passports for Megan and her daughter Lau.
4	"Episode 4"	Paul Andrew Williams	Marston Bloom	1 October 2018	6.10
David goes off the grid, forcing an increasingly anxious Jonah to manipulating Lau to find out where he has gone. He tracks him down to a casino in Macau, where he witnesses him handing over the hard drive containing footage of the truck driver that killed Megan to Kai Huang, a member of a known Triad family whom David was reportedly taking bribes from.
5	"Episode 5"	Paul Andrew Williams	Fred Armesto & Adam Gyngell	8 October 2018	5.56
Jonah is arrested on suspicion of murdering Faraz Reza. David admits to being involved in the murder and hands in the gun, allowing Jonah to go free. Jonah pursues Kai Huang and ambushes him on his brother's wedding day in an attempt to find out what truly happened to Megan. Sally and Arthur discuss how Faraz's demise will impact their overall objective.
6	"Episode 6"	Paul Andrew Williams	Fred Armesto & Adam Gyngell	15 October 2018	5.06
Jonah finally pieces together the mystery surrounding the death of Megan. She was paid HK$5 million the day before her murder. She was however shot by Kai the day after the transaction. Kai is later killed in prison. A stranger abducts Lau.
7	"Episode 7"	Paul Andrew Williams	Fred Armesto & Adam Gyngell	22 October 2018	5.22
It turns out Lau was kidnapped by a man hired by Xiadong Xo, a prominent local politician, who raped Megan 20 years ago. Xo turns out to be Lau's real father and they realise he was behind the HK$5 million payment. Jonah finds out that Megan was used by Sally and Arthur, so that they could potentially blackmail Xo in return for political favours. Jonah and David go to rescue Lau, but it doesn't quite go as planned.
8	"Episode 8"	Paul Andrew Williams	Harry Williams and Jack Williams	29 October 2018	5.93
Jonah and Lau seek protection in the consulate. Jonah convinces journalist Michael Cohen to help them publish a story linking Megan's murder to a Xiadong Xo. Jonah and Michael find evidence that it was not the magnate himself, but someone working closely with him that was behind the killing of Megan.

== Home media ==
The complete series was released on Region 2 DVD and Region B Blu-ray on 19 November 2018 via Dazzler Media.
