= Full English (TV series) =

TV series or program

- The Johnson family: Eve, Dusty, Edgar, Wendy, Jason, Ken, and Ken's imaginary friend Squidge.
- Created by: Jack Williams; Harry Williams; Alex Scarfe
- Voices of: Daisy Haggard; Kayvan Novak; Richard Ayoade; Rosie Cavaliero; Oliver Maltman
- Countries of origin: United Kingdom; United States
- Original language: English
- No. of seasons: 1
- No. of episodes: 6 (1 unaired)

Production
- Executive producers: Jack Williams; Harry Williams; Alex Scarfe
- Producer: Claudia Katz
- Running time: 30 minutes
- Production companies: Two Brothers Pictures; Rough Draft Studios

Original release
- Network: Channel 4
- Release: 12 November – 17 December 2012

Full English is a British short-lived adult animated sitcom created by Jack Williams, Harry Williams and Alex Scarfe for Channel 4. The programme was produced by Two Brothers Pictures. It parodies and satirises various popular entertainment personalities in the United Kingdom.

Full English first aired on 12 November 2012, with the first series ending abruptly after the final episode, due to air on 17 December 2012, was pulled from schedules in the morning, over fears by Channel 4 executives that the episode would have been seen as "offensive" to the Roma community. It was replaced with a repeat of Alan Carr: Chatty Man. The episode, titled "My Big Fat Gypsy Knightmare," revolves around a character named Eve who fears becoming conventional like her parents. In an act of rebellion, she decides to marry a gypsy boy. Originally scheduled to air as the fourth episode, it was later delayed until the end of the season to allow for additional deliberation by Channel 4 executives regarding its content.

On the show's Facebook page, the producers expressed disappointment at the delaying of the episode, stating that Episode 6, which they considered the best in the series, would not be aired due to legal and OFCOM concerns, with OFCOM advising that the episode should not be aired because it "may cause significant complaints". Consequently, the series concluded abruptly. It was repeated three times on Channel 4's sister channel, E4 in 2013. The repeat run did not feature the final episode, which is only available on the DVD.

It was later announced on its official Facebook page that the show had been cancelled.

== Background ==
Full English is set in the heart of British suburbia.

Edgar, a put upon wage slave, works for his self-obsessed, borderline-evil father-in-law Ken Lavender. Married to houseproud wife Wendy, they are parents to three very different children, man-child Dusty, amiable and dimwitted Jason and 'Emo' Eve.

Created, produced and written by brothers Harry & Jack Williams, the show is made using hand-drawn animation, with all the characters and sets created by the artist Alex Scarfe – each frame is individually drawn before being scanned into a computer using Toon Boom Harmony, which gives it a realistic depth. This work is done by Rough Draft Studios in Los Angeles and South Korea, and is the first show were they are credited as a production company.

== Characters ==
- Edgar Johnson (Richard Ayoade) – the patriarch of the Johnson family, husband to Wendy and father to Dusty, Jason and Eve. He is a nerdy, bespectacled man in his late-40s who is a coward and runs away in the first signs of conflict or danger. He is shy and often sexually frustrated. Edgar is employed by his father-in-law, Ken, at his confectionery company Sweet Lavender, even though Ken believes his daughter, Wendy, is too good for him.
- Wendy Johnson (Rosie Cavaliero) – the wife of Edgar and the mother of Dusty, Jason and Eve, a housewife in her mid-50s who tires of minding after her family, as she is often the only one capable of doing so. She is not unhappy with her home life, it just leaves her feeling unfulfilled. Wendy is the apple of her father, Ken's, eye.
- Dusty Johnson (Kayvan Novak) – the eldest son of the family, a lazy, obese man-child who still lives at home with his parents, to their despair. He is imaginative and not unintelligent but dimwitted, lisping and overly optimistic about his own ideas. The rest of the family is content to leave him to his own fantasy world. In episode 4 it was revealed Dusty is 30 years old, despite his age being stated as 28 on the Channel 4 website as well as shown on episode 3.
- Jason Johnson (Kayvan Novak) – the 17-year-old middle child, is an amiable, jocular lad, generally kind but stupid. In episode 2, it was hinted that he could be gay.
- Evelyn "Eve" Johnson (Daisy Haggard) – the youngest of the Johnson children. She is 14 years old, fat and an emo (or a Goth, it is unclear) who struggles with her diet and social life. She is moody, surly and monosyllabic towards her family, but shows a fanciful and romantic side in other contexts. She is also the lead vocalist of a punk band, Bloodmonkey.
- Ken Lavender (Oliver Maltman) – is the egotistical ageing lothario and self-made millionaire owner of Sweet Lavender confectionery company, as well as the father of Wendy Johnson. He has lived a full and exciting life and does not care who he 'screws over' on his way to the top. He loves his daughter dearly but despises her hapless husband, Edgar.
- Squidge (Kayvan Novak) – a huge, green balloon-like creature, and purely a figment of Ken's imagination. His squeaking voice masks a wildly amoral nature, and he often eggs Ken on to do terrible things; the official website suggests that Squidge could be a manifestation of Ken's evil side.
- Various other characters in the show are voiced by series regulars: Simon Greenall, Lucy Montgomery and Darren Boyd.

== Episodes ==
No.	Title	Directed by	Written by	Original release date
1	"Britain's Got Bloodmonkey"	Dwayne Carey-Hill	Jack Williams & Harry Williams	12 November 2012
Eve decides to enter her band, Bloodmonkey, into Britain's Got Talent. They're not very good. But thanks to a misunderstanding, Simon Cowell thinks her parents are dead, and the sympathy vote looks like it might propel her all the way to the final (where she'll be up against an asthmatic girl in a wheelchair who plays the violin). Meanwhile, Edgar and Wendy go away for their anniversary, but unknown to them their eldest son Dusty has stowed away as a surprise. And Ken attempts to rekindle an old romance with Her Majesty the Queen – invoking jealousy of Squidge. Spoofs: Skins, Britain's Got Talent, Simon Cowell, Jeremy Kyle, Ant & Dec, Adolf Hitler, Elizabeth II, Stephen Fry, Gregg Wallace, Geordie Shore
2	"Mangina"	Richard Bazley	Jack Williams & Harry Williams	19 November 2012
Edgar shows his true colours by running away and leaving his family for dead during a break-in at the house. Their neighbour Johannes, who has a lust for Wendy, saves the day. Shamed, Edgar resolves to man up and goes to his local gym, but decides taking steroids will be quicker and easier. Meanwhile, Jason goes traveling in Thailand to find himself and meets someone who looks exactly like him. And Eve accidentally summons the spirits of two great women to guide her with a Ouija board. Spoofs: Paralympic Games, London Underground, Jade Goody, Princess Diana, Charlie Brooker, Bear Grylls, Top Gear, Virgin Mary
3	"Dusty and the Real Girl"	Ira Sherak	Jack Williams & Harry Williams	26 November 2012
Dusty surprises the family by bringing home a girl. An inflatable one. Wendy decides he needs a girlfriend so she hires him an escort – without exactly realising what that word really means. Meanwhile, Eve overdoses on chocolate during a tour of Ken's confectionery factory. Ken has a crisis of conscience about manufacturing food that makes people fat and contemplates selling up to his arch-nemesis and occasional squash partner Richard Branson. And tiny aliens plan to take over the Earth. Spoofs: Channel 4 Documentaries, Charlie and the Chocolate Factory, Match.com, James Cameron, Avatar, WeightWatchers, Richard Branson, Britain's Next Top Model, Snoop Dogg, James Blunt, Michael McIntyre, Nigella Lawson, Dannii Minogue
4	"Bank to the Future"	Richard Bazley	Jack Williams & Harry Williams	3 December 2012
Edgar decides it's time for his eldest son Dusty to finally make something of himself, but he's horrified when Dusty lands a job as a banker. Dusty does a brilliant job and is applauded for taking thoughtless risks with large amounts of money including his most daring scheme – gambling the entire country's economy by flipping a coin. Meanwhile Jamie Oliver comes back from the future and his latest crusade is helping kids pass their exams one by one. And Ken attends a psychiatrist to rid of Squidge.
5	"Edgar, Interrupted"	Dwayne Carey-Hill	Jack Williams & Harry Williams	10 December 2012
After getting slightly annoyed at work, Edgar is committed to a mental home by Ken. To Edgar's surprise, the place is full of men who are hiding out from their demanding families, and he decides he quite likes it there. Until he realises the place isn't quite what it seems... Meanwhile, Dusty is bitten by a squirrel and decides this has given him superpowers. He starts fighting crime dressed as 'Squirrelman'. And at home, Jason tries to fill Edgar's shoes as the man of the house.
6	"My Big Fat Gypsy Knightmare"	Ira Sherak	Jack Williams & Harry Williams	Unaired
Eve is worried that she'll become boring and suburban-like her parents, so when she meets a gypsy boy it's the perfect opportunity to rebel – and the two of them decide to get married. Her parents don't object as much as they might, though. Wendy's found an old bucket list, and they're working their way through it to prove they're still young at heart. And Ken is offered a knighthood – but will Sir Richard Branson allow it?

== Full English adventure game ==
A free Flash adventure game was released to promote the show. Developed by Leamington Spa digital agency fish in a bottle, it is a multi-chapter game that is meant to introduce the characters, and features the full voice cast from the show.

The game received positive reviews, with Mike Rose of review site Gamezebo stating, "Full English may be a simply point-and-clicker, but it's good fun and the parodies are often delicious."

== Reception ==
Full English was universally panned by critics, most pointing out the show's poor attempt to emulate American adult animated shows, notably the uncanny character resemblances to Family Guy, as well as the poor art designs of the characters in general. On the character designs, Harry Venning of The Stage wrote: "The animation is flat and uninteresting, while the characters' faces are ugly and unappealing."

More positive reviews came from Sam Wollaston of The Guardian, who wrote "I think it's hilarious." and The Metro describing Full English as: "It's rough around the edges but it does have the requisite dysfunctional family at its filthy heart".
