= The Widow (TV series) =

British television series

- Genre: Drama; Suspense; Action
- Created by: Harry Williams; Jack Williams
- Written by: Harry Williams; Jack Williams
- Directed by: Sam Donovan; Olly Blackburn
- Starring: Kate Beckinsale; Charles Dance; Matthew Le Nevez; Alex Kingston; Babs Olusanmokun; Jacky Ido; Shalom Nyandiko; Bart Fouche; Louise Brealey; Ólafur Darri Ólafsson; Réginal Kudiwu
- Composer: Dominik Scherrer
- Country of origin: United Kingdom
- Original language: English
- No. of seasons: 1
- No. of episodes: 8

Production
- Executive producers: Harry Williams; Jack Williams; Christopher Aird; Kate Beckinsale; Sam Donovan
- Producer: Eliza Mellor
- Cinematography: Stuart Howell; John Lee
- Editors: Daniel Greenway; Peggy Koretzky; David Thrasher
- Running time: 60 minutes
- Production companies: Two Brothers Pictures; Film Afrika (South Africa production services)

Original release
- Network: Amazon Prime Video
- Release: 1 March 2019
- Network: ITV
- Release: 8 April – 30 April 2019

The Widow is a British television drama series created and written by Harry and Jack Williams, airing on both British ITV and American streaming service Amazon Prime Video, with Prime also carrying the series internationally. It stars Kate Beckinsale as a woman who believes that her husband was killed in a plane crash three years earlier, but then discovers that he is still alive in the Congo. The show was released on Amazon Prime Video on 1 March 2019 before being broadcast on ITV from 8 April 2019.

== Premise ==
The series follows Georgia Wells (Kate Beckinsale) whose husband Will died in a plane crash on a trip to the Congo in Africa. Three years later, she sees a man resembling him on a news story reporting civil unrest in the Democratic Republic of the Congo, and she travels to Kinshasa to uncover the truth. She starts to look for answers, particularly why her husband evidently faked his own death. The eight-episode series features multiple story lines and explores themes such as violence and corruption.

== Production ==
The Widow is a co-production of British ITV and Amazon Video. It was filmed in South Africa, Wales, and Rotterdam. The heat in some of the locations became difficult for Beckinsale, who was hospitalised after passing out while shooting a scene.

== Cast ==
- Kate Beckinsale as Georgia Wells
- Charles Dance as Martin Benson
- Alex Kingston as Judith Gray
- Babs Olusanmokun as General Azikiwe
- Shalom Nyandiko as Adidja
- Luiana Bonfim as Gaëlle Kazadi
- Louise Brealey as Beatrix
- Bart Fouche as Pieter Bello/Hennie Botha
- Ólafur Darri Ólafsson as Ariel
- Howard Charles as Tom
- Réginal Kudiwu as Djamba
- Jacky Ido as Emmanuel
- Matthew Le Nevez as Will Mason
- Matthew Gravelle as Joshua

== Episodes ==
| No. | Title | Directed by | Written by | Original release date | Original UK air date | UK viewers (millions) |
|---|---|---|---|---|---|---|
| 1 | "Mr. Tequila" | Sam Donovan | Harry Williams & Jack Williams | March 1, 2019 | 8 April 2019 | 8.08 |
Georgia Wells lives alone in a cottage in the Welsh countryside. While watching a news story about civil unrest in the Democratic Republic of the Congo, she sees a man that she believes is her husband, who presumably died in a plane crash three years earlier. Still haunted by the past, Georgia travels to the Congo to find out the truth.
| 2 | "Green Lion" | Sam Donovan | Harry Williams & Jack Williams | March 1, 2019 | 9 April 2019 | 6.88 |
To find the truth about her husband, Georgia must first work with Emmanuel, together they attempt to track down the mysterious Pieter Bello. Meanwhile, Beatrix makes a shocking discovery about how Ariel lost his sight.
| 3 | "The Survivors" | Sam Donovan | Harry Williams & Jack Williams | March 1, 2019 | 15 April 2019 | 6.74 |
Judith arranges a lift for Georgia with a group of medical aid workers, but the volatility of the region threatens to derail their journey. Pieter forces Adidja to partake in a terrifying exercise, while Ariel must confront the horrors of his past.
| 4 | "Violet" | Sam Donovan | Harry Williams & Jack Williams | March 1, 2019 | 16 April 2019 | 6.42 |
Martin and Ariel seek to determine the identity of the army general linked to the plane crash, while Georgia puts herself in danger to get closer to the elusive Pieter.
| 5 | "Poteza" | Olly Blackburn | Harry Williams & Jack Williams | March 1, 2019 | 22 April 2019 | 6.27 |
As she finally comes face to face with Pieter, Georgia resorts to extreme measures to learn more about Will's disappearance. Judith's return to her home brings back memories from her past, but she doesn't foresee an unexpected twist of fate.
| 6 | "The Spider and the Web" | Olly Blackburn | Harry Williams & Jack Williams | March 1, 2019 | 23 April 2019 | 6.16 |
Georgia and Adidja make a journey deep into the Congolese wilderness that yields unexpected consequences. Meanwhile, in the search for answers about the plane crash, Martin puts himself and Ariel ever closer to Azikiwe's dangerous path.
| 7 | "Will" | Olly Blackburn | Harry Williams & Jack Williams | March 1, 2019 | 29 April 2019 | 6.77 |
The search for Will takes Georgia to Rwanda. On her arrival, she prepares to finally learn the answers about what really happened to her husband, but is not ready for what she finds there.
| 8 | "Nigel" | Olly Blackburn | Harry Williams & Jack Williams | March 1, 2019 | 30 April 2019 | 6.30 |
Blindsided by the revelations about Will, Georgia returns to Kinshasa. But before she can right the wrongs of the past, she must contend with those determined to stop her from exposing the truth.

== Reception ==
On Rotten Tomatoes season 1 has an approval rating of 56% based on reviews from 27 critics. The site's consensus states: Ferociously ambitious, The Widow boasts Kate Beckinsale's killer action chops but goes astray in a jungle of problematic tropes and unsatisfying twists.
