= The Tourist (TV series) =

Internationally co-produced television series

- Series 1 promotional poster
- Genre: Drama-thriller; Black comedy
- Written by: Harry Williams; Jack Williams
- Directed by: Chris Sweeney
- Starring: Jamie Dornan; Danielle Macdonald; Shalom Brune-Franklin; Ólafur Darri Ólafsson; Genevieve Lemon; Alex Dimitriades; Damon Herriman
- Composer: Dominik Scherrer
- Countries of origin: United Kingdom; Australia; Germany
- Original language: English
- No. of series: 2
- No. of episodes: 12

Production
- Executive producers: Harry Williams; Jack Williams; Christopher Aird; Andrew Benson; Tommy Bulfin; Chris Sweeney
- Producer: Lisa Scott
- Cinematography: Geoffrey Hall
- Production companies: Two Brothers Pictures; Highview Productions; All3Media; South Australian Film Corporation; ZDF

Original release
- Network: BBC One (UK); Stan (Australia); HBO Max (US; series 1); ZDF (Germany)
- Release: 1 January 2022 – 28 January 2024

The Tourist is a drama-thriller black comedy television series. It stars Jamie Dornan as the victim of a car crash who wakes up in a hospital in the Australian outback with amnesia. The series premiered on 1 January 2022 on BBC One in the UK, the next day on Stan in Australia, and on 3 March on HBO Max in the US. The second series, set in Ireland, premiered on 1 January 2024 in the UK and Australia, and on 29 February 2024 in the US.

== Plot ==
The plot places the series in the thriller genre, but the dialogue and characters contain many elements of black comedy, and there is also a romantic sub-plot.

=== Series 1 ===
An Irishman wakes up with amnesia in an Australian hospital. Seeking answers, he encounters a local woman who remembers him and volunteers to help him rediscover his identity. What few clues he can find hint that he has a dark past from which he must escape before it catches up with him.

== Cast and characters ==
=== Main ===
- Jamie Dornan as The Man / Elliot Stanley / Eugene Cassidy
- Danielle Macdonald as Probationary Constable Helen Chambers
- Victoria Haralabidou as Lena Pascal
- Shalom Brune-Franklin as Luci Miller / Victoria / Emma Halliwell
- Greg Larsen as Ethan Krum

=== Season 1 ===
- Ólafur Darri Ólafsson as Billy Nixon
- Alex Dimitriades as Kosta Panigiris
- Genevieve Lemon as Sue
- Danny Adcock as Ralph
- Damon Herriman as Detective Inspector Lachlan Rogers
- Alex Andreas as Dimitri Panigiris
- Maria Mercedes as Freddie Lanagan
- Michael Ibbotson as Peter the Policeman
- Kamil Ellis as Sergeant Rodney 'Lemon' Lammon
- The Umbilical Brothers (David Collins and Shane Dundas) as helicopter pilots Arlo and Jesse
- Lasarus Ratuere as Chris
- Rhonda Doyle as Constable Carter

=== Season 2 ===
- Conor MacNeill as Detective Ruairi Slater
- Olwen Fouéré as Niamh Cassidy
- Francis Magee as Frank McDonnell
- Réginal-Roland Kudiwu as Monsieur Tioté
- Diarmaid Murtagh as Donal McDonnell
- Nessa Matthews as Orla McDonnell
- Mark McKenna as Fergal McDonnell
- Siobhán O'Kelly as Claire McDonnell
- Nathan Page as Constable Alex

== Episodes ==
Series	Episodes	Originally released			Average UK viewers (millions)
Series	Episodes	First released	Last released	Network	Average UK viewers (millions)
1	6	1 January 2022	30 January 2022	BBC One	8.46
2	6	1 January 2024	28 January 2024	BBC One	3.69

=== Series 1 (2022) ===
No. overall	No. in series	Title	Directed by	Written by	Original release date	U.K viewers (millions)
1	1	"Episode 1"	Chris Sweeney	Harry Williams and Jack Williams	1 January 2022	8.74
A man is driving across the Australian outback, stops for a bathroom break, and is then chased and run off the road by a cargo truck. He wakes up in hospital and is interviewed by Probationary Constable Helen Chambers, but has no memory of who he is, why he is there, or what has happened. A note in his pocket indicates that he is to meet someone at a cafe in a town called Burnt Ridge at a specified time the next day. The following morning he checks out of the hospital, against medical advice, and goes to the cafe. Luci, the waitress, ushers him out of the cafe just before a bomb goes off. Billy, a large man with an American accent, arrives at the hospital with a bouquet of flowers looking for the man. Luci has photos on her phone of her with the man, indicating that she knows him, and she deletes them. The man retraces his steps around Burnt Ridge over the previous days and finds a mobile phone. He receives a call begging for help from a man who knows him and is buried alive.
2	2	"Episode 2"	Chris Sweeney	Harry Williams and Jack Williams	2 January 2022	8.12
The man and Luci hire a helicopter and race to find the caller, who is buried in an oil drum in Currimundi, but he is dead when they find him. Helen follows up with hospital staff and interviews Billy about why he went to the hospital. Helen's fiancé, Ethan, is not supportive and is angry with her for working on the case, believing that she should be spending more time with him. The man recognizes Luci's handwriting on the helicopter's insurance waiver as the handwriting from the note that sent him to the cafe. Luci admits that she knows him and that his name is Elliot Stanley.
3	3	"Episode 3"	Chris Sweeney	Harry Williams and Jack Williams	9 January 2022	8.60
Luci informs Elliot they met in Bali six months earlier and had a passionate romance, which ended when Elliot killed a man who was trying to murder them. Over drinks, they rekindle their feelings. In the morning they evade the police looking for them and return to Burnt Ridge. Helen worries that Elliot is in danger. She ignores Ethan, who belittles her involvement in any serious police work, and drives to Burnt Ridge. Billy tracks Elliott, Luci and Helen to a boarding house and attacks them with a shotgun. Elliot saves Helen's life and ends Billy's attack. Billy falls into an empty well and they assume that he is dead. Luci does not want to resume a relationship with Elliot and the two separate. Detective Rogers, from the major crimes division, and local police officer Lammon find the buried man's body, and are informed about the shootout in Burnt Ridge. Rogers issues an arrest order for Elliott as a murder suspect. Helen, hearing Rogers' order on her radio, attempts to arrest Elliot, but he steals her gun and kidnaps her, forcing her to drive him. Luci returns to her home and finds Billy, who greets her as "Victoria".
4	4	"Episode 4"	Daniel Nettheim	Harry Williams and Jack Williams	16 January 2022	8.72
Kostas, who takes hallucinogens, flies to Australia with his brother Dmitri, looking for Elliot. Luci fights off Billy, who dies after crashing into a window. Billy's phone rings and Luci answers it and talks to Kostas. She chooses a fake passport from several and inadvertently drops the others while leaving. The plane with Kostas and Dmitri lands and they get into a taxi, but Kostas kills the driver at Dmitri's urging. Helen and Elliot arrive at Luci's trailer, see the passports, and realize "Luci" is trying to leave the country. Helen realizes that the passport names are mixed first and last names of the Spice Girls and deduces that Luci's passport will have the first and last name missing from the passports that were left behind. They set off after her but Helen's car breaks down in a small town. Elliot and Helen rent a motel room, spend the night and become much closer. At an airport, Luci resolves to "end this" and places a phone call to India. A police constable recognizes Helen's car and Detective Rogers speeds to the motel. Helen hides as Elliot attempts to surrender. Lammon tries to call for backup but Rogers shoots him. Rogers handcuffs Elliot and calls Kostas to tell him that he has Elliot. Kostas laughs and chats with "Dmitri", who is revealed to be a hallucination, as Kostas is in the taxi alone.
5	5	"Episode 5"	Daniel Nettheim	Harry Williams and Jack Williams	23 January 2022	9.07
After killing Lammon, Detective Rogers takes Elliot to Kostas. Rogers reveals Kostas has taken Rogers' wife hostage, forcing him to bring Elliot to Kostas. When they arrive, Elliot drinks water from Kostas's bottle that has LSD in it. Kostas demands that Elliot lead them to a hidden bag of money he stole from Kostas. Elliot starts hallucinating and Kostas continues to converse with the imaginary "Dmitri". When Elliot starts digging for the money, he goes through a series of psychedelic experiences. There he encounters people from his past, including his father in his death bed, Kostas and Luci, and Lena Pascal, who says that she knows Elliot and is living in Adelaide. When he returns to consciousness, he finds the bag. Helen receives a tip from Luci about Elliot's likely location and leads some police officers there, but finds out that Luci was lying. She decides to forget Elliot and returns to Ethan. Luci joins Kostas, Rogers, and Elliot and puts Kostas on a video call with his elder brother Dimitri, living in India.
6	6	"Episode 6"	Daniel Nettheim	Harry Williams and Jack Williams	30 January 2022	9.12
Kostas refuses to accept that Dimitri is alive. A shootout ensues in which Kostas is killed and Luci is injured. Rogers leaves to save his wife while Elliot grabs the money and drives away with Luci. She reveals that she is a con-artist named Emma Halliwell and had targeted Kostas and his drug-trafficking operation before meeting Elliot. They stole Kostas's money aided by another man named Marko and fled to the remote Australian outback. Kostas sent Billy after them and it was Billy who buried Marko in the barrel. Luci dies from her injuries, Elliot hides the money and calls Helen asking for help. Ethan gives Helen an ultimatum to choose between him and Elliot, and Helen chooses to help Elliot. Reunited, Helen and Elliot discover that Rogers has blamed them for the murders and that the police are after them. They take hostages at a restaurant to get the police to bring Lena Pascal from Adelaide. Helen finds evidence that proves that Rogers is lying. Elliot is taken to jail and meets Lena Pascal, who reveals that she was mutilated and others died because Elliot had them working as drug smuggling 'mules'. Elliot is bailed out, but does not know why he is not charged for what he did to Lena. Elliot gives the bag of money to Sue, the owner of the Burnt Ridge boarding house, and tries to kill himself, but is later recovered safe, remembering much of his previous life. Learning of Elliot's past, Helen leaves him. A heartbroken Elliot swallows a handful of pills and Helen is persuaded to give him a second chance.

=== Series 2 (2024) ===
No. overall	No. in series	Title	Directed by	Written by	Original release date	BBC One broadcast	U.K viewers (millions)
7	1	"Episode 1"	Fergus O'Brien	Harry Williams & Jack Williams	1 January 2024	1 January 2024	4.22
Helen and Elliot travel to Ireland in response to a letter from 'Tommy', who claims to know about Elliot's past. When they go to meet him, Elliot is kidnapped by siblings Donal and Orla McDonnell and Donal's son, Fergal. Helen calls the Gardai (police) and is taken to the police station by Detective Ruairi Slater, where she meets Elliot's mother, Niamh Cassidy. When Helen shows Niamh a photo from the kidnap site, Niamh promptly leaves. Helen follows her and witnesses her stab and kill a man, claiming that her son was kidnapped by his cousins. Orla is shown on the phone confirming Elliot is trapped on an island; the call is to Lena Pascal, who is on a plane to Ireland, coincidentally sitting next to Ethan Krum.
8	2	"Episode 2"	Fergus O'Brien	Harry Williams & Jack Williams	1 January 2024	2 January 2024	3.59
Helen brings Detective Slater to the site of the murder she witnessed, only to discover the site cleaned. They are confronted by Frank McDonnell, a powerful crime lord. Elliot manages to escape aided by one of his captors, young Fergal McDonnell. Fergal tells Elliot he does not know why they kidnapped him. Frank castigates his son Donal for starting a war with the Cassidys by kidnapping Elliot. Donal replies he did it to make Niamh Cassidy "give back what she took from you". At the police station, Helen discovers some surprising DNA evidence from the site of Elliot's kidnapping. She travels to Slater's home to discuss it, and finds Slater in the basement alongside a woman's decomposing body. Elliot sneaks into the McDonnell's headquarters in a whisky museum and finds an exhibit called 'The Disappearance of Elliot Stanley'.
9	3	"Episode 3"	Lisa Mulcahy	Harry Williams & Jack Williams	1 January 2024	7 January 2024	3.33
Frank tells Elliot that his real name is Eugene Cassidy. Elliot escapes, but cannot find or contact Helen. The agitated Slater imprisons Helen in his basement. He tells Helen that body is that of his wife, who died from cancer, and that he was overcome and couldn't bear parting with her. Ethan Krum, seeking to reunite with Helen, arrives at Elliot's hotel and they form an awkward partnership to search for her. They track Helen to Slater's house, but he lies successfully and sends them away. Helen bonds with Slater by playing the role of his dead wife. They feel sympathy for each other and Slater releases Helen. Elliot and Ethan fight off attacks by the McDonnell gang. Lena Pascal meets with the McDonnells and reveals that she wrote the letter that brought Elliot to Ireland. Elliot is taken to meet his mother, Niamh. Helen rings Elliot and they reunite at the hotel, where Helen reveals the DNA test shows that Fergal McDonnell is Elliot's son.
10	4	"Episode 4"	Lisa Mulcahy	Harry Williams & Jack Williams	1 January 2024	14 January 2024	3.50
Elliot calls Frank and asks to meet Fergal. Frank makes the meeting conditional on Niamh Cassidy returning a missing case sent to him long ago by his dying father. The plane carrying the case crashed off the coast of Ireland and Frank contracted a diver named Elliot Stanley to retrieve it. Frank suspects (accurately) that Niamh killed Stanley and took the case. Elliot and Helen travel to Niamh’s but as she dismisses Frank’s story, McDonnell men attack the house. Elliot, Helen and Niamh escape. Donal's wife Claire confirms Elliot is Fergal's biological father, enraging Donal. Fergal contacts Elliot to arrange a meeting at his school. On the way, Helen and Elliot argue about remaining in Ireland, given the trouble it has brought them. Elliot and Fergal talk briefly before Donal and his men arrive and take Elliot and Helen at gunpoint to meet Lena Pascal. Lena wants Elliot to suffer as she did, and shoots Helen in the stomach.
11	5	"Episode 5"	Kate Dolan	Harry Williams & Jack Williams	1 January 2024	21 January 2024	3.65
Elliot manages to disarm Donal and drive Helen away to get help. In hospital, Helen is in a coma and has a dream in which she and Elliot return to Australia, but her obsession with Elliot's past and Frank's missing case cause Elliot to leave her. In real life, Elliot stays by Helen's bedside and is met by Claire McDonnell, who tells Elliot that she wants him to kill her abusive husband. Elliot meets Donal but it is a trap, but he is saved by one of Niamh's henchmen. Helen wakes from her coma. Elliot meets Claire again, who is badly bruised. Elliot kidnaps Donal and takes him to an abandoned hotel where Donal shot and killed Elliot’s brother Joe, many years earlier, after mistaking Joe for Elliot. Elliot fires his gun. Helen learns of Donal’s murder through the TV news and assumes Elliot is responsible.
12	6	"Episode 6"	Kate Dolan	Harry Williams & Jack Williams	1 January 2024	28 January 2024	3.87
Elliot is arrested for killing Donal, which he strongly denies. Helen doesn’t believe Elliot and leaves him, stating that although she loves him, his apparent violent, criminal life is "too much". Frank suggests to a stunned Fergal that he can do something to “prove himself a true McDonnell”. Fergal asks for Elliot's help, they evade some McDonnell henchman in a car chase and go to Cassidy’s Pub. At the airport, Helen decides to stay and solve the Elliot Stanley mystery and solicits the aid of Ethan and Slater. With the additional help of Stanley’s widow Deirdre, Helen figures out the truth. Deirdre implies that Elliot may be Eugene's biological father. The Cassidy and McDonnell clans meet up at Cassidy’s Pub, ready for a showdown. Frank enters the pub alone carrying a bomb Fergal was supposed to smuggle in. Elliot protects Fergal as Niamh reveals she killed Donal. Helen arrives with the case and shows its contents: love letters between Frank’s father and Niamh’s mother, indicating that Frank and Niamh are brother and sister. Helen and Elliot profess their love for each other. In an epilogue, Helen and Elliot are living happily in Amsterdam. An unopened file they threw into a fire suggests Elliot/Eugene Cassidy was an undercover agent.

== Production ==
=== Development ===
In February 2020, it was announced that BBC One and Stan would co-produce a limited mystery-thriller series written by Harry and Jack Williams, directed by Chris Sweeney, and produced by Two Brothers Pictures. HBO Max later joined as a distributor for the US market. In January 2021, Jamie Dornan, Danielle Macdonald, Shalom Brune-Franklin, Ólafur Darri Ólafsson, Alex Dimitriades, and Hugo Weaving joined the cast of the series. Damon Herriman replaced Weaving a week before filming started.

=== Filming ===
==== Series 1 ====
Filming, which began in March 2021 in South Australia, took place in the regional towns of Port Augusta and Peterborough, and the Flinders Ranges, with some scenes being shot in Adelaide. The production crew recreated Bali's Kuta Beach on Adelaide's North Haven Beach. Principal photography was concluded in July 2021.

==== Series 2 ====
Filming for the second series started in April 2023 with Jamie Dornan and Danielle Macdonald returning. Principal photography began in April 2023 in Dublin, Ireland. Diarmaid Murtagh, Conor MacNeill, Olwen Fouéré, Francis Magee, Mark McKenna, Réginal-Roland Kudiwu and Nessa Matthews joined the cast alongside Dornan, Macdonald and Larsen. Shooting took place in and around Dublin with some scenes being shot in Bray, Djouce and the Wicklow Mountains.

== Release ==
The series is distributed internationally by All3Media.

The first episode of the series premiered on 1 January 2022 on BBC One in the UK, and the following day in Australia on Stan. On 3 March 2022 it was released on HBO Max in the US and Latin America, as well as on Amazon Prime in Canada.

Later all six episodes were released on BBC iPlayer. With an overall view of 18 million on its release, the series became the third most successful drama launch for the iPlayer. As of March 2022, it became the most watched series on iPlayer. The first episode was watched 6,428,000 times on iPlayer alone during 2022, making it the 3rd most viewed individual programme on the platform that year.

ZDF released the series on 12 August in Germany.

In March 2022, the series was renewed for a second series, with filming having started in April 2023. Set in Ireland, the second series premiered on 1 January 2024 on BBC One in the UK and on Stan in Australia. In the US, the series moved to Netflix after being dropped by Max, and premiered on 29 February 2024.

== Reception ==
=== Series 1 ===
Review aggregator Rotten Tomatoes reported 97% approval based on 36 reviews with an average rating of 7.40/10. The site's critics consensus reads: "Jamie Dornan makes for a compelling guide through The Tourist, a beguiling drama that deepens its mystery with solid shocks and welcome moments of levity." On Metacritic, the show has a weighted average score of 81 out of 100 based on 11 critics, indicating "universal acclaim". Critics particularly praised Dornan's and Macdonald's performances.

In a 4/5 stars review, Lucy Mangan wrote in The Guardian: "This outback thriller from the writer of The Missing is fun, stylish and clearly still has many twists up its sleeve." While Ed Cumming of The Independent addressed it as Dornan's best work until then, Lauren Morris in the Radio Times described it as "An unpredictable, edge-of-your-seat mystery that startles you with laugh-out-loud moments of ridiculousness." The Guardian ranked it number 24 on their list of best television shows of 2022. It also became the most-watched drama of 2022 in the UK.

=== Series 2 ===
On the review aggregator website Rotten Tomatoes, 96% of 23 critics' reviews are positive, with an average rating of 7.60/10. The website's consensus reads: "The Tourist continues to twist and turn towards an unguessable destination, with Jamie Dornan and Danielle Macdonald's palpable performances making the journey wholly worthwhile along the way." Metacritic, which uses a weighted average, assigned the film a score of 78 out of 100, based on 10 critics, indicating "generally favorable" reviews.

In a 4/5 star review in the Evening Standard, Nick Clark praised the writing and said that the second series was "tense, brutal and often laugh-out-loud funny". Awarding it 4/5 stars, Anita Singh of The Daily Telegraph felt that it was funnier than the first series. Adam Sweeting writing for The Arts Desk, said: "Sometimes the Williamses lurch too far in the direction of gratuitous weirdness." He lauded Dornan's performance stating: "But a big hand for Jamie Dornan, who negotiates slings, arrows and blows to the head with good grace, wry humour and quiet authority." Barbara Ellen of The Observer rated it 3/5 stars and said: "the mystical layer that set the initial series apart is largely missing", but she still found it "strong".

=== Accolades ===
Year	Award	Category	Recipient(s)	Result	Ref.
2022	Logie Awards	Most Outstanding Actor	Jamie Dornan	Nominated	
2022	Logie Awards	Most Outstanding Supporting Actor	Damon Herriman	Nominated	
2022	Logie Awards	Most Outstanding Miniseries or Telemovie	The Tourist	Nominated	
2022	Monte Carlo Television Festival Awards	Golden Nymph Award for Best Television Series	The Tourist	Won	
2022	Monte Carlo Television Festival Awards	Golden Nymph Award for Best Creation	The Tourist	Won	
2022	Monte Carlo Television Festival Awards	Betaseries Public Prize	The Tourist	Won	
2022	Edinburgh International Television Festival	Breakthrough Award	Danielle Macdonald	Won	
2022	TV Times Magazine Awards	Favourite Dramatic Performance	Jamie Dornan	Nominated	
2022	AACTA Technical Crafts Awards	Best Cinematography in Television	Ben Wheeler (for episode 1)	Nominated	
2022	AACTA Technical Crafts Awards	Best Cinematography in Television	Geoffrey Hall (for episode 6)	Nominated	
2022	AACTA Technical Crafts Awards	Best Production Design in Television	Scott Bird (for episode 1)	Won	
2022	AACTA Awards	Best Television Drama Series	The Tourist	Nominated	
2022	AACTA Awards	Best Lead Actor in Television Drama	Jamie Dornan	Nominated	
2022	Royal Television Society Crafts and Design Awards	Best Sound-Drama	Paul Cotterel, Paul Carter and Del Kenneally	Nominated	
2022	Royal Television Society Crafts and Design Awards	Best Picture Enhancement	Dan Coles	Nominated	
2022	Royal Television Society Crafts and Design Awards	Best Photography-Drama & Comedy	Ben Wheeler	Nominated	
2022	Venice TV Awards	Best Drama	The Tourist	Nominated	
2022	Location Managers Guild Awards	Outstanding Locations in Limited Anthology Television	Sarah Abbey, Mark Evans, Maria Humphreys and Scott McCarten	Nominated	
2022	British Society of Cinematographers Awards	Best Cinematography in a Television Drama	Ben Wheeler	Won	
2022	British Academy Television Awards	Best Photography and Lighting: Fiction	Ben Wheeler	Nominated	
2022	National Film Awards UK	Best Supporting Actress in a TV Series	Shalom Brune-Franklin	Nominated	
2024	Logie Awards	Best Drama Program	The Tourist	Nominated	
