= The Perfect Lie =

2026 South Korean television series

- Promotional poster
- Hangul: 라이어
- Lit.: Liar
- RR: Raieo
- MR: Raiŏ
- Genre: Psychological thriller; Mystery
- Based on: Liar by Harry and Jack Williams
- Written by: Baek Jae-young
- Directed by: Jo Young-min
- Starring: Yoo Yeon-seok; Seo Hyun-jin
- Music by: Kim Tae-seong
- Country of origin: South Korea
- Original language: Korean
- No. of episodes: 8

Production
- Production companies: Kakao Entertainment; Zip Cinema; Cedar and Cypress

Original release
- Network: MBC TV
- Release: October 30, 2026 – present

The Perfect Lie (Korean: 라이어) is an ongoing South Korean psychological thriller television series written by Baek Jae-young, directed by Jo Young-min, and starring Yoo Yeon-seok and Seo Hyun-jin. It is an adaptation of the 2017 British drama Liar by Harry and Jack Williams. The series premiered on MBC TV on October 30, 2026, and airs every Friday and Saturday at 21:50 (KST). It is also available for streaming on Disney+ and Hulu.

== Synopsis ==
The Perfect Lie follows the story of Kang Ji-seon, an elementary school teacher, and Min Jun-ho, a cardiac surgeon who raises his son alone. After an apparently perfect first encounter, the two begin giving completely opposing accounts of the same memory. As their stories collide, they engage in an intense search for the truth, where it becomes increasingly difficult to distinguish between truth and lies.

== Cast ==
=== Main ===
- Yoo Yeon-seok as Min Jun-ho

A cardiac surgeon who raises his son as a single father.

- Seo Hyun-jin as Kang Ji-seon

An elementary school librarian who becomes involved with Min Jun-ho.

- Ok Ja-yeon as Lee Hwa-young

Lieutenant from the Women and Youth Affairs Division.

=== Supporting ===
People around Ji-seon

- Kim Ji-hyun as Kang Ji-eun

Anesthesiologist at Sangcheon University Hospital, Ji-seon's older sister.

- Lee Chun-hee as Kim Hyung-soo

Kang Ji-eun's husband and Kang Ji-seon's brother-in-law.

- Oh Dong-min as Park Joong-hyun

Administrative staff at Sangcheon University Hospital, Ji-seon's former lover.

People around Jun-ho

- Kang Ji-yong as Min Hyun-soo

A 5th grade elementary school student, son of Jun-ho and the deceased Eun-hye.

- Jung Ji-woo as Joo Eun-hye

Jun-ho's deceased wife, Hyun-soo's mother.

People involved in the case

- Im Sung-jae as Park Seok-gu

Lee Hwa-young's husband.

== Production ==
=== Development ===
The series was first announced in late 2025 as a joint production between Kakao Entertainment and its subsidiary Zip Cinema. Director Jo Young-min was confirmed to lead the project. The script is written by Baek Jae-young.

=== Casting ===
In December 2025, it was confirmed that Yoo Yeon-seok and Seo Hyun-jin would reunite as lead actors eight years after their collaboration in Dr. Romantic.

== Viewership ==
The Perfect Lie : South Korea viewers per episode (thousands)

Season	Episode number												Average
Season	1	2	3	4	5	6	7	8	9	10	11	12	Average
1	418	390	414	411	495	479	965	628	TBD	TBD	TBD	TBD	TBD

Source: Audience measurement performed nationwide by Nielsen Korea.

Average TV viewership ratings (nationwide)
Ep.	Original broadcast date	Average audience share (Nielsen Korea)	
Ep.	Original broadcast date	Nationwide	Seoul
1	October 30, 2026	1.9% (26th)	2.0% (21st)
2	October 31, 2026	1.9% (29th)	1.8% (28th)
3	November 6, 2026	2.2% (21st)	2.2% (20th)
4	November 7, 2026	2.4% (27th)	2.3% (21st)
5	November 13, 2026	2.7% (21st)	2.5% (20th)
6	November 14, 2026	2.5% (25th)	2.4% (26th)
7	November 20, 2026	5.2% (6th)	5.2% (7th)
8	November 21, 2026	3.6% (15th)	3.6% (8th)
9	November 27, 2026		
10	November 28, 2026		
11	December 4, 2026		
12	December 5, 2026		
Average		—	—
In the table above, the blue numbers represent the lowest ratings and the red numbers represent the highest ratings.; N/A denotes ratings that were not published.
