= The Assassin (TV series) =

British television series

- Promotional poster
- Genre: Crime thriller
- Created by: Harry Williams; Jack Williams
- Starring: Keeley Hawes; Freddie Highmore; Gerald Kyd; Shalom Brune-Franklin; Devon Terrell; David Dencik; Alan Dale; Gina Gershon; Jack Davenport; Richard Dormer; Ali Fardi; Soroush Helali
- Countries of origin: United Kingdom; Germany; Australia
- Original language: English
- No. of series: 2
- No. of episodes: 12

Production
- Executive producers: Sarah Hammond; Harry Williams; Jack Williams; Daisy Mount; Alex Mercer; Keeley Hawes; Freddie Highmore; Hamish Wright
- Producer: Nige Watson
- Production companies: Two Brothers Pictures; Banijay Entertainment; Screen; Hermit Productions

Original release
- Network: Amazon Prime Video (United Kingdom); ZDF (Germany); Stan (Australia)
- Release: 25 July 2025 – present

The Assassin is a British crime thriller television series created by Harry and Jack Williams for Amazon Prime Video, ZDF and Stan. It stars Keeley Hawes and Freddie Highmore. The first series was released on 25 July 2025. On 7 November 2025, it was reported that a second series was in development. All six episodes of the second series were released on 6 November 2026.

== Premise ==
A retired assassin living in Greece is reunited with her estranged son who is seeking answers about his father and his mother's past. However, both find themselves in danger when the assassin's past catches up with her.

== Cast ==
- Keeley Hawes as Julie Green, a retired assassin and former soldier
  - Georgina Bitmead as young Julie
- Freddie Highmore as Edward Green, an investigative journalist and Julie's son
- Gerald Kyd as Luka, a local butcher and friend of Julie
- Alan Dale as Aaron Cross, the billionaire CEO of Cross Global Mining
- Shalom Brune-Franklin as Kayla Cross, Aaron's daughter and Edward's fiancée, head of the Cross Global Mining charitable foundation
- Devon Terrell as Ezra Cross, Aaron's son, Kayla's brother and Vice-Chairman of Cross Global Mining
- David Dencik as Jasper de Voogdt, the former head of IT for Cross Global Mining
- Gina Gershon as Marie Bertrand, a woman tracking down Edward
- Jack Davenport as Sean, an assassin and Julie's ex-boyfriend
- Richard Dormer as Damien Hammond, Julie's handler
- Ali Fardi as Khaled, a Libyan National Army prison guard
- Soroush Helali as Chris, a bodyguard for Aaron Cross

== Production ==
The series is created by Harry and Jack Williams and produced by Two Brothers Pictures in association with German company ZDF, All3Media International, and Stan in Australia. Keeley Hawes and Freddie Highmore star, and executive produce. Executive producers also include Sarah Hammond.

The series began filming in Greece in August 2024.

Many scenes of the series were taken in Porto Germeno, Salamis and Athens.

== Series overview ==
Series	Episodes	Originally released
1	6	25 July 2025
2	6	6 November 2026

== Episodes ==
=== Series 1 (2025) ===
No. overall	No. in series	Title	Directed by	Written by	Original release date
1	1	"Episode 1"	Lisa Mulcahy	Harry Williams & Jack Williams	25 July 2025
In 1994, assassin Julie Green skillfully kills a gangster and several henchmen in Bulgaria, and the same evening finds out she is pregnant. 31 years later, Julie has been retired a decade and lives on a Greek island. She is visited by Edward, her estranged journalist son, who confronts her about constantly lying and a large sum of money he has been anonymously gifted. Her former handler Damien supposedly calls, offering Julie triple her fee to kill Kayla, daughter of Cross Global Mining CEO Aaron Cross, on a nearby yacht. However, she deduces the caller is using AI to impersonate Damien and holds off. Cross has Jasper de Voogdt, his head of IT, imprisoned in Libya for trying to blackmail him. Jasper secretly calls Cross’s office, quoting “Chantaines” and demanding to be broken out. A local wedding on the island is attacked by assassins targeting Julie, who massacre the village. She kills a sniper and flees with Edward and local butcher Luka to the safety of the Cross’s nearby yacht. Once on board, Edward reveals Kayla is his fiancée.
2	2	"Episode 2"	Lisa Mulcahy	Hamish Wright	25 July 2025
Kayla has the yacht depart the island immediately. Sean, an assassin and Julie’s ex-boyfriend, boards the yacht by jetski and targets her after the contract value triples. She kills him after a brutal fight in the galley, revealing her background to the others. Julie reveals Kayla was her planned target, and to uncover who wants them both dead, suggests travelling to Damien’s last known location in Albania. Jasper is extracted by a prison guard, but flees to avoid being killed as a loose end by Cross. Kayla tells Edward that Jasper emailed her weeks prior about information on “Chantaines”, which could destroy the company if brought to light. Edward is revealed to be investigating the Cross family. Kayla’s brother Ezra tells her he knows nothing of “Chantaines”, and that his shady behaviour has only been because he wants her charitable foundation removed from the company. In London, a woman named Marie attends an art class and expresses an interest in Edward's parentage.
3	3	"Episode 3"	Lisa Mulcahy	Krissie Ducker	25 July 2025
Ezra meets with his father in France, who is hosting a party. Marie attends and tells Ezra she is looking for Edward, claiming to be his aunt. The two sleep together, and she tries to find Edward’s location via Ezra and Kayla. Jasper calls Ezra, telling him even he and Kayla are not safe from Aaron ensuring “Chantaines” does not come out. Edward confesses to Kayla he initiated their first meeting when investigating links between CGM and the trust that left him money. Despite assuring her his love is genuine, she leaves the group. In Tirana, Damien has been reported dead, but a what3words geocode on a corpse under his name in the local morgue leads Julie, Edward and Luka to his hideout. He tells Julie he was attacked two weeks prior by men looking for her. Julie reluctantly concedes she needs to stop pursuing and flee with a new identity. Luka, having instead wanted to confront his villagers killers, leaves in disgust. To stop himself being hunted, Damien betrays Julie, but is held at gunpoint by Edward.
4	4	"Episode 4"	Daniel Nettheim	Harry Williams, Jack Williams and Hamish Wright	25 July 2025
Julie disarms and shoots Damien, but spares his life in exchange for a truck and access to an Athens safehouse. In France, Ezra tells Kayla about Jasper's call, and how he saw Aaron discreetly reading an old letter from a safe. Kayla confronts her father about the letter and what “Chantaines” means, but he claims ignorance. Marie pays Aaron’s bodyguard to kill him, but Ezra saves him. In return, Aaron promises him successorship of CGM if he helps keep “Chantaines” a secret for the company. A news report airs showing Edward and Julie as wanted after the island massacre. Edward and Ezra call Jasper about “Chantaines”, and he agrees to explain everything if they transport him to Athens from Tripoli. Whilst high on cocaine, Ezra divulges the plan to Marie and arranges to have Jasper killed to impress his father. Kayla finds the letter after getting Aaron drunk. Edward meets a paranoid Jasper at the National Garden, where Julie wounds an assassin who opens fire on them.
5	5	"Episode 5"	Daniel Nettheim	Selina Lim	25 July 2025
Julie kills the assassins pursuing Jasper and Edward. Marie arrives and convinces Edward to escape in her car, saying she’s his aunt and working with Julie. She tells him it was his father who made the anonymous payment to him, but then drugs him. The letter and codename “Chantaines” is revealed to be Kayla and Ezra’s mothers suicide note, which implicates her and Aaron in having one of CGM’s first investors, an arms dealer, murdered. Jasper confesses to Julie he doesn’t know specifics about “Chantaines”, and his wider threats were a bluff to get out of prison. Luka returns to the injured Damien, and tortures him for details of the men who killed his village. After finding Damien’s laptop with the hit information, he meets with Julie and Jasper in northern Greece to crack its encryption. Julie tells Luka she kept Edward from his father to protect him. Kayla calls Julie after Ezra tells her about the botched Jasper assassination. Searching Damien’s laptop, Julie recalls she was hired by the Cross’s to kill the arms dealer back in 1994, but spared his family. Edward is put on a private jet. Julie reveals that Marie might be his biological mother.
6	6	"Episode 6"	Daniel Nettheim	Krissie Ducker	25 July 2025
Edward awakes in Spain. Marie explains his real name is Florent, his true parentage and how Julie took him as a baby after killing his father and putting her in a coma. Julie breaks into Marie’s compound, with Luka doing overwatch. Ezra becomes acting CEO after Aaron dies from prescription overdose, which is implied he may have orchestrated. He offers company resources to locate Edward if Kayla keeps “Chantaines” a secret. Kayla agrees, and later arrives in Spain with armed mercenaries to assist Luka, and they raid the compound. Luka confronts but spares Afonso, Marie’s henchman who massacred his village. Edward flees and finds Julie in the basement. She explains she never wanted children, and was even glad to have a miscarriage when pregnant, but couldn’t leave him alone as a baby believing both his parents were dead. Marie tells Edward he was born from a surrogate and isn't biologically hers. She poisons him, telling Julie she has spent 29 years planning revenge against her. Marie demands Edward execute Julie in exchange for the atropine antidote. Full of guilt, Julie gives Edward her gun and tells him to do it to save himself, but he kills Marie instead. Edward survives after being airlifted to hospital in the Cross family helicopter. Ezra burns his mothers suicide note. 3 months later, Julie is in a relationship with Luka, and joins Kayla and Edward to visit Edward’s biological mother.

=== Series 2 (2026) ===
No. overall	No. in series	Title	Directed by	Written by	Original release date
7	1	"Episode 1"	Terry McDonough	Harry Williams & Jack Williams	6 November 2026
8	2	"Episode 2"	Terry McDonough	Harry Williams & Jack Williams	6 November 2026
9	3	"Episode 3"	Terry McDonough	Harry Williams & Jack Williams	6 November 2026
10	4	"Episode 4"	Sarah O'Gorman	Harry Williams & Jack Williams	6 November 2026
11	5	"Episode 5"	Sarah O'Gorman	Harry Williams & Jack Williams	6 November 2026
12	6	"Episode 6"	Sarah O'Gorman	Harry Williams & Jack Williams	6 November 2026

== Release ==
The first series premiered on both Prime Video in the UK and Stan in Australia on 25 July 2025. The second series was released on 6 November 2026.

== Reception ==
On the review aggregator website Rotten Tomatoes, 72% of 18 critics' reviews are positive. The website's consensus reads: "Though it struggles to find its footing between thrilling caper and comedic drama, The Assassin is sustained by the full array of talent shared between Keely Hawes and Freddie Highmore to splendid effect." Reviewing for The Guardian, Lucy Mangan gave the series five stars, describing it as "perfectly crafted preposterousness ... stylish, witty, tightly written (and) even more tightly paced". David Opie for Empire magazine gave it four stars, praising the interplay between Hawes' and Highmore's characters and summarising that "it's how The Assassin plays with gender and genre that marks the show out as something worth making time for". Emily Baker for The i Paper was more critical, characterising it as a "wannabe James Bond thriller" which "pushes the boundaries of reasonable storytelling beyond comprehension", with Hawes' talent "completely let down by thin characterisation and a shoddy, juvenile script".
