= Shalom Brune-Franklin =

British-Australian actress

- Born: 18 August 1994 (age 32); St Albans, England
- Citizenship: British, Australian
- Education: Ocean Reef Senior High School; Western Australian Academy of Performing Arts
- Occupation: Actress
- Years active: 2012–present
- Known for: Our Girl; The State; Doctor Doctor; Bad Mothers; Line of Duty (series 6); The Tourist

Shalom Brune-Franklin is a British-Australian actress. On television, she is known for her roles in the Nine Network series Doctor Doctor (2016–2017), the BBC series Our Girl (2017–2018), Line of Duty series 6 (2021) and The Tourist (2022), the Channel 4 series The State (2017), the Binge series Love Me (2021–2023) and the HBO series Dune: Prophecy (2024–). She was named a 2026 Brit to Watch by Variety.

== Early life and education ==
Shalom Brune-Franklin was born in St Albans in England to a Mauritian mother and Thai-born English father.

When she was a teenager, she moved with her parents and her younger brother, Siam, to Perth, Western Australia. She holds both British and Australian citizenship.

During her studies at Ocean Reef Senior High School, Brune-Franklin took up drama, and then won the school's drama award for high achievement. She enrolled to study journalism at the Edith Cowan University, but after seeing the Western Australian Academy of Performing Arts (WAAPA), she decided on an acting career. Brune-Franklin auditioned at the WAAPA and then later that year was the most outstanding student.

== Acting credits ==
Key
†	Denotes works that have not yet been released

=== Film ===
Year	Film	Role	Notes
2013	Dinner Date	Jennifer	Short
2015	Tryptophan	Chocolate Dealer	Short
2016	Swiss Avalanche	Holly	Short
2017	OtherLife	Coder #2	
2017	Thor: Ragnarok	College Girl #1	
2026	Sunny Dancer	Lucy	

=== Television ===
Year	Title	Role	Notes
2016	Barracuda	Leanne	Episode: "2000"
2016–2017	Doctor Doctor	Aoife	Series regular; 11 episodes
2017	The State	Umm Khulthum	Mini-series
2017–2018	Our Girl	Maisie Richards	Series regular; 12 episodes
2019	Bad Mothers	Bindy	Mini-series
2020	Moominvalley	Seahorses	2 episodes
2020	Cursed	Morgan le Fay	Series regular; 9 episodes
2020	Roadkill	Rose Dietl	Mini-series
2021	Line of Duty	DC Chloë Bishop	Recurring role; 7 episodes
2021	War of the Worlds	Lilly	2 episodes
2021–2023	Love Me	Ella	Series regular; 11 episodes
2022	The Tourist	Luci/Victoria	Series 1; 6 episodes
2023	Great Expectations	Estella	Miniseries
2024	Baby Reindeer	Keeley	Miniseries
2024	Dune: Prophecy	Mikaela	TV series
2025	The Assassin	Kayla	Miniseries
2025	The Girlfriend	Brigitte	TV series

=== Theatre ===
Year	Play	Role	Venue	Notes
2014	The Grapes of Wrath	Muley Graves	Western Australian Academy of Performing Arts, Mount Lawley, Perth	
2014	Blood Wedding	La Novia (The Bride)	Western Australian Academy of Performing Arts, Mount Lawley, Perth	
2015	The Playboy of the Western World	Sara Tansey	Western Australian Academy of Performing Arts, Mount Lawley, Perth	
2015	Macbeth	Lady Macbeth	Western Australian Academy of Performing Arts, Mount Lawley, Perth	
2016	Girl Shut Your Mouth	Grace	State Theatre Centre of Western Australia, Perth	with Black Swan State Theatre Company
