= Gerald Kyd =

Greek-Scottish actor

- Born: Gerasimos Avvakoumides; 1973 (age 52–53); Pretoria, South Africa
- Occupation: Actor

Gerald Kyd (born Gerasimos Avvakoumides, 1973) is a Scottish actor of Greek descent. He became known for his role as Sean Maddox in the BBC medical drama Casualty.

== Early life and education ==
Gerald Kyd was born as Gerasimos Avvakoumides in Pretoria, South Africa. His father was Greek and his mother Scottish.

He moved to England after his parents divorced when he was 14, and studied at the London Academy of Music and Dramatic Arts for three years, graduating in 1997.

== Career ==
Kyd was spotted by an agent who gave him work immediately after graduating. He later spent seven months performing in live theatre with the Royal Shakespeare Company.

He starred as Sean Maddox in the BBC medical drama Casualty from 1998 until 2000, later reprising the role for a few episodes in 2006.

Kyd subsequently appeared in many British TV series, including The Split in 2022, Malory Towers in 2024, and The Assassin in 2025.

He played MI6 agent Thomas Mercer in the 2025 Netflix miniseries Hostage, and in 2026 played Mylonas in the Netflix crime drama series Legends.

== Filmography ==
=== Films ===
Year	Title	Role	Notes
2003	The Principles of Lust	Waiter	
2003	Lara Croft: Tomb Raider – The Cradle of Life	Sean's Man	
2004	The Defender	Morgan	Direct-to-video

=== Television ===
Year	Title	Role	Notes
1997	Underworld	Niko	1 episode
1998–2000, 2006	Casualty	Sean Maddox	Main cast (series 13—14), recurring role (series 21)
1999	CI5: The New Professionals	Derbeg	Episode: "Hostage"
2003	Grease Monkeys	Jeremy	Episode: "Hey Fever"
2004	In Search of Shakespeare	Various	Miniseries, ensemble cast
2006	Brief Encounters	Steve	Miniseries, episode: "All in a Day's Work"
2006	All in the Game	Ratza	TV movie
2010	Persons Unknown	Mark Renbe	Summer replacement limited series, main cast
2013	The Bible	Cyrus	Miniseries, episode: "Survival"
2016	Sherlock	Thomas Ricoletti	Episode: "The Abominable Bride"
2017	Silent Witness	Yusuf Hamed	2 episodes: "Identity (parts 1 & 2)"
2018	Unforgotten	Adrian Mullery	Recurring role (series 3)
2019	Jesus: His Life	Caiaphas	Episode: "Caiaphas: The Raising of Lazarus"
2021	Doctor Who	General Logan	Episode: "War of the Sontarans"
2022	The Split	J.J. Johnson	Recurring role (series 3)
2024	Malory Towers	Mr. Murray	Recurring role (season 5)
2025	The Assassin	Luka	Main cast
2025	Hostage	Agent Thomas Mercer	Miniseries, supporting cast
2026	Legends	Mylonas	6 episodes

== Theatre credits ==
- The Seagull – Boris Trigorin – Royal Shakespeare Company
- Cyrano De Bergerac – Chevalier D'Antignac-Juzet
- The Prophet in Exile – Khalil Gibran –
- The Pit and the Pendulum – William –
- Loves Labours Lost – King Ferdinand – English Touring Theatre
- Deathtrap – Clifford Anderson –
- The Local Stigmatic – David – Lyric Theatre, Hammersmith
- The Ramayana – Rama – Birmingham
- Richard II – Henry Hotspur Percy – Globe Theatre
- Edward II – Gaveston – Globe Theatre
- Revelations – Tony – Hampstead Theatre, London
- Conversations in Havana – Che –
- The Three Musketeers – Athos – Bristol Old Vic
- Blood and Gifts – Colonel Afridi – Royal National Theatre (2010)
- The Real Thing – Henry – West Yorkshire Playhouse, Leeds & UK Tour (2012)
- 55 Days – John Lilburne – Hampstead Theatre, London (2012)
- Richard III – Catesby – Trafalgar Studios, London (2014)
- Feed the Beast – Michael – Birmingham Repertory Theatre (2015)
- Hapgood – Ridley – Hampstead Theatre (2015)
