= Liar (TV series) =

British TV drama series (2017 & 2020)

- Genre: Drama; Mystery; Thriller
- Created by: Harry Williams; Jack Williams
- Starring: Joanne Froggatt; Ioan Gruffudd; Zoë Tapper; Warren Brown; Richie Campbell; Jamie Flatters; Shelley Conn; Danny Webb; Katherine Kelly
- Composers: Glenn Gregory; Berenice Scott
- Country of origin: United Kingdom
- Original language: English
- No. of series: 2
- No. of episodes: 12

Production
- Executive producers: Harry Williams; Jack Williams; James Strong
- Producer: Eliza Mellor
- Cinematography: Matt Gray BSC
- Running time: 45 minutes
- Production company: Two Brothers Pictures

Original release
- Network: ITV
- Release: 11 September 2017 – 6 April 2020

Liar is a British thriller television series created by Harry and Jack Williams, and co-produced by ITV and SundanceTV. The series stars Joanne Froggatt and Ioan Gruffudd as two people whose initial attraction leads to far-reaching consequences for them and their friends and families. The series premiered on ITV on 11 September 2017, with the first series concluding on 16 October 2017. The programme was renewed for a second and final series, which premiered on 2 March 2020, concluding on 6 April 2020.

== Plot ==
Laura Nielson, a smart and capable teacher in the middle of a breakup, is set up on a date with widowed surgeon Andrew Earlham. However, the morning after, Laura realises she has been raped. When reporting the rape to the police proves fruitless, Laura investigates the incident herself.

== Cast and characters ==
=== Main ===
- Joanne Froggatt as Laura Nielson, a smart and dedicated teacher who is newly single
- Ioan Gruffudd as Andrew Earlham, a renowned surgeon whose son, Luke, is a pupil in Laura's class
- Zoë Tapper as Katy Sutcliffe, Laura's older sister, a surgical nurse who works with Andrew at the local hospital
- Richie Campbell as Liam Sutcliffe, Katy's husband and father of her two children
- Jamie Flatters as Luke Earlham, Andrew's son who is a pupil in Laura's class
- Shelley Conn as DI Vanessa Harmon, a detective with the fictional Thanet and Dover Police who investigates Laura's allegation of rape
- Danny Webb as DS Rory Maxwell, a Thanet & Dover Police detective and second in command to Vanessa Harmon
- Kieran Bew as Ian Davis, Laura's new love interest

=== Recurring ===
- Warren Brown as PC Tom Bailey (Series 1), Laura's ex-boyfriend who is having an affair with her sister, Katy
- Eileen Davies as Andrew Earlham's elderly friend Sylvia (Series 1)
- Jill Halfpenny as Jennifer Robertson, Vanessa's wife, a soldier
- Dawn Steele as Catherine McAulay (Series 1), an Edinburgh barmaid and friend of Andrew Earlham
- Katherine Kelly as DI Karen Renton (Series 2), an officer from the Metropolitan Police
- Sam Spruell as Oliver Graham (Series 2), an old acquaintance of Andrew Earlham
- Amy Nuttall as Winnie Peterson (Series 2), a nurse
- Howard Charles as Carl Peterson (Series 2), Winnie's husband who owns a boatyard, an ex-soldier and Afghanistan veteran
- Dermot Crowley as Henry Neilson (Series 2), the father of Laura Neilson and Katy Sutcliffe
- Jack Colgrave Hirst, as Greg Maxwell (Series 2), son of DS Rory Maxwell, a National Crime Agency officer
- Lucy Speed as a Counsellor (Series 2)
- Michael Wildman as DI Michael McCoy (Series 2)
- Jenny Galloway as the Marina Inn hotel receptionist (Series 2)

== Production ==
Liar was announced on 15 April 2016 as the first full production from Two Brothers Pictures. On 30 September 2016, the miniseries was commissioned by American cable network SundanceTV and British commercial broadcaster ITV. Commercial broadcasters TF1 and Seven have also ordered the series. Filming for the series began in London and Kent in November 2016. The marshes were filmed in Tollesbury, Essex. The seaside hometown for main character Laura was filmed at Deal, Kent and Kingsdown. Some inner town sequences in Brockley, Nunhead, Shortlands (Episode 3), South Ealing, and Edinburgh (Episode 4).

After the first series concluded on 16 October 2017, it was announced that the programme would be returning for a second series. The second series, which premiered on 2 March 2020, focuses on a whodunnit storyline involving the cliffhanger of the first series' finale. Froggatt and Gruffudd both returned.

== Episodes ==
=== Series 1 (2017) ===
No. overall	Episode	Directed by	Written by	Original release date	UK viewers (millions)
1	"The Date"	James Strong	Harry Williams & Jack Williams	11 September 2017	8.86
2	"I Know You're Lying"	James Strong	Harry Williams & Jack Williams	18 September 2017	8.50
3	"White Rabbit"	James Strong	Harry Williams & Jack Williams	25 September 2017	8.87
4	"Catherine"	Samuel Donovan	Harry Williams & Jack Williams	2 October 2017	8.82
5	"Check Mate"	Samuel Donovan	Harry Williams & Jack Williams	9 October 2017	9.03
6	"The Marshes"	Samuel Donovan	Harry Williams & Jack Williams	16 October 2017	9.49

=== Series 2 (2020) ===
No. overall	Episode	Directed by	Written by	Original release date	UK viewers (millions)
7	Episode 1	James Strong	Harry Williams & Jack Williams	2 March 2020	7.02
8	Episode 2	James Strong	Harry Williams & Jack Williams	9 March 2020	6.85
9	Episode 3	James Strong	Harry Williams & Jack Williams	16 March 2020	6.69
10	Episode 4	Chris Sweeney	Harry Williams & Jack Williams	23 March 2020	7.15
11	Episode 5	Chris Sweeney	Harry Williams & Jack Williams	30 March 2020	6.59
12	Episode 6	Chris Sweeney	Harry Williams & Jack Williams	6 April 2020	6.91

== Broadcast ==
The series premiered on ITV on 11 September 2017 at 9pm, in exactly the same slot that the Two Brothers Pictures series Rellik premiered on BBC One. It premiered on SundanceTV on 27 September 2017 and is available for streaming on Sundance Now and YouTube. The series was acquired in Australia by the Seven Network and in New Zealand by TVNZ. It was also acquired in the Philippines by ABS-CBN and premiered on Kapamilya Channel and other television channels and platforms on 10 March 2025 with a Tagalog-dubbed version.

== Adaptations ==
As of 2015, 9 remakes of Liar have been released by networks in other countries, including Botswana, India, Italy, Spain, Germany, France, Turkey, Greece, Slovakia and Malaysia. The Italian remake, Non mentire, premiered on Canale 5 on February 17, 2019. The Spanish remake, Mentiras, was first released on Atresplayer Premium on April 19, 2020, before eventually premiering on Antena 3 on January 12, 2022. The German remake, Du sollst nicht lügen, was first released on Joyn Plus+ on February 2, 2021, before debuting on pay television on Sat.1 Emotions on February 7 and premiering free-to-air on Sat.1 on February 9. The French remake, Mensonges, was first released on Salto on July 30, 2021, before premiering on TF1 on September 2, 2021. The Turkish remake, Yalanci, premiered on Show TV on September 17, 2021. The Greek remake, Psemata, premiered on Alpha TV on May 5, 2022. The Slovak remake, Klamstvo, premiered on Markíza on February 20, 2023. The Malaysian remake, "LIAR", was first released on Astro GO (on demand) on March 25, 2023, before premiering on Astro RIA on April 3, 2023. The Hindi adaptation, Marzi, aired on Voot on March 3, 2020. An upcoming Korean remake, The Perfect Lie, will be released on October 30, 2026 on MBC TV and Disney+.
