= Dominik Scherrer =

British composer (born 1967)

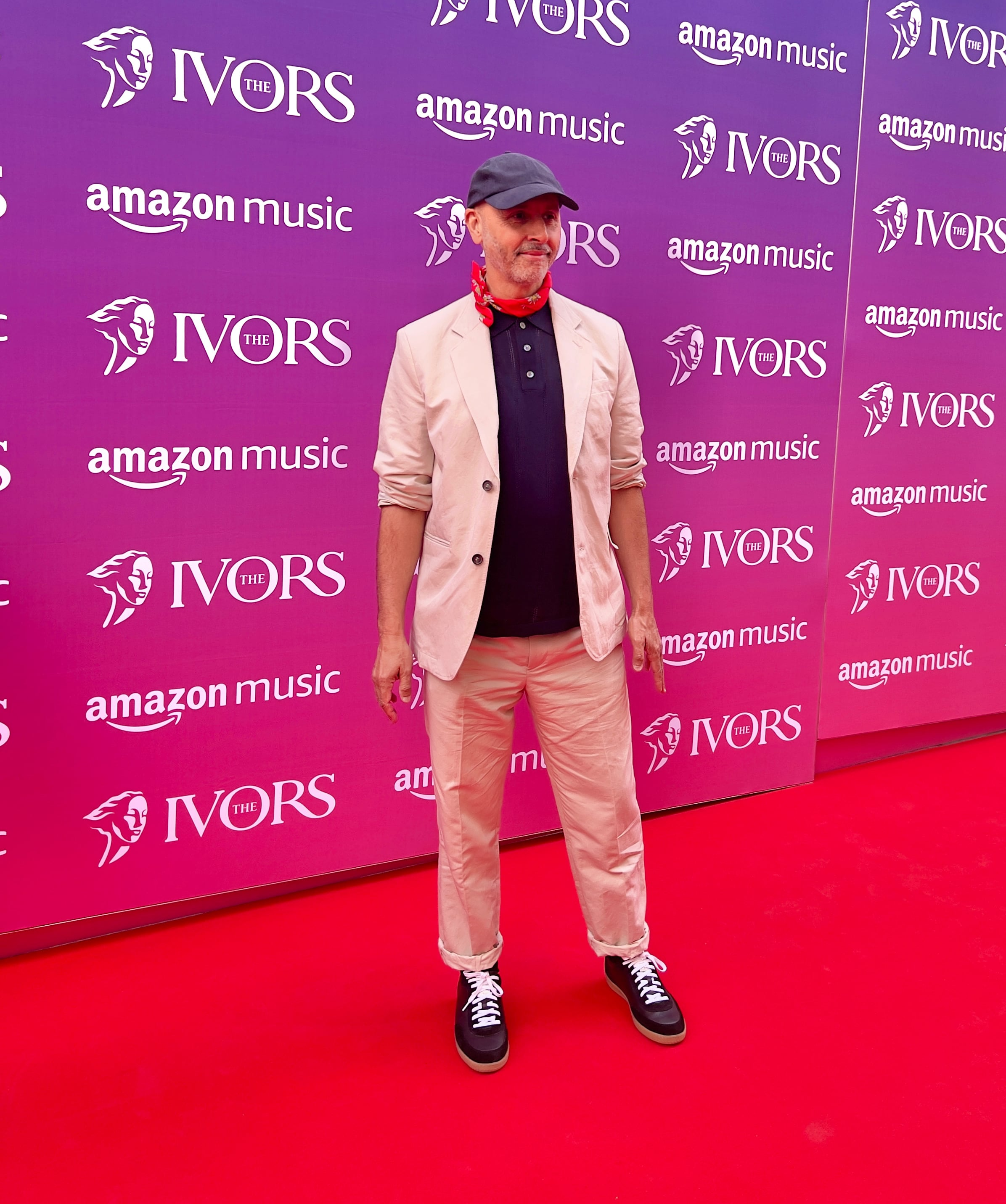
Scherrer in 2024

Dominik Scherrer is a Swiss-British composer born in 1967 in Zurich, Switzerland, who has written prolifically for film, theatre and television.

== Career ==
Scherrer has composed the music score for both seasons of the British television series Ripper Street and worked on a third series in 2014. He won the Best Television Soundtrack Award for his work on Ripper Street at the 2014 Ivor Novello Awards.

== Filmography ==
- The Honeytrap (2002)
- The Nine Lives of Tomas Katz (2002)
- Agatha Christie's Marple (2004–13)
- Jericho (2005)
- The Truth (2006)
- Scenes of a Sexual Nature (2006)
- Primeval (2007–09)
- Inspector George Gently (2010–11)
- Christopher and His Kind (2011)
- Just Henry (2011)
- Monroe (2011–12)
- All About You ('Tutto parla di te', 2012)
- Ripper Street (2012–16)
- The Missing (2014–2016)
- An Inspector Calls (2015)
- The Collection (2016)
- One of Us (2016)
- Requiem (2018)
- The City and the City (2018)
- The Widow (2019)
- Baptise (2019–2021)
- Memory (documentary short) (2019)
- Elizabeth Is Missing (2019)
- The Serpent (2021)
- The Tourist (2022)
- The Rapture (2026)

== Discography ==
- The Honeytrap (original soundtrack) (2007)
- Scenes of a Sexual Nature (original soundtrack) (2007)
- Monroe (original soundtrack) (2011)
- Primeval (original soundtrack) (2011)
- An Inspector Calls (original soundtrack) (2015)
- Ripper Street (original soundtrack) (2015)
- The Missing (original soundtrack) (2015)
- Requiem (original soundtrack) with Bat for Lashes (2018)
- The City and the City (original soundtrack) (2018)

== Awards and nominations ==
- Ivor Novello Award, Nominee Best Television Soundtrack, Boat Story (2024)
- Ivor Novello Award, Nominee Best Television Soundtrack, The Serpent (2022) (also Golden Globe nominee)
- Ivor Novello Award, Nominee Best Television Soundtrack, The Collection (2017)
- Primetime Emmy Award for Outstanding Music Composition for a Miniseries, Movie, or a Special, nominee, The Missing (2015)
- Ivor Novello Award, Winner Best Television Soundtrack, Ripper Street (2014)
- Royal Television Society Award, nominee for Best Television Soundtrack Ripper Street (2013)
- Ivor Novello Award, Nominee Best Television Soundtrack, Agatha Christie's Marple (Series 5) (2011)
- New York Festivals Film & TV Award New York Festivals], Winner Best Television Soundtrack, Agatha Christie's Marple (Series 1) (2005)
- Locarno Film Festival, Winner Prix Action Light, Hell for Leather (1998)
- International Composers Festival, Hastings and Bexhill-on-Sea
