= Boat Story =

British television series

- Genre: Black comedy; Crime drama; Thriller
- Created by: Jack Williams; Harry Williams
- Written by: Jack Williams; Harry Williams
- Directed by: Jack Williams; Harry Williams; Alice Troughton; Daniel Nettheim
- Starring: Daisy Haggard; Paterson Joseph; Craig Fairbrass; Michele Austin; Ethan Lawrence; Joanna Scanlan; Tcheky Karyo; Phil Daniels; Dominic Weatherill
- Theme music composer: Dominik Scherrer
- Country of origin: United Kingdom
- Original language: English
- No. of episodes: 6

Production
- Executive producers: Cristopher Aird; Tommy Bulfin; Daniel Walker; Jack Williams; Harry Williams; Sarah Hammond; Daisy Haggard; Paterson Joseph
- Producer: Matthew Bird
- Production locations: Versa Studios, Leeds, United Kingdom
- Production companies: All3Media; Two Brothers Pictures

Original release
- Network: BBC One; Amazon Freevee
- Release: 19 November – 4 December 2023

Boat Story is a 2023 British comedy thriller television miniseries made for BBC One and Amazon Freevee by the All3Media production company, Two Brothers Pictures. Written and co-directed by Harry and Jack Williams, it stars Daisy Haggard, Paterson Joseph, Tchéky Karyo, Joanna Scanlan, Craig Fairbrass, and Phil Daniels.

== Synopsis ==
Cocaine is found on a boat by two hard-up strangers, Janet and Samuel, who agree to sell it and split the proceeds. They quickly find themselves entangled with the police, masked hit men, and a sharp-suited gangster known as "The Tailor".

== Cast ==
- Daisy Haggard as Janet Campbell
- Paterson Joseph as Samuel Wells
- Tchéky Karyo as The Tailor
- Joanna Scanlan as Pat Tooh
- Craig Fairbrass as Guy
- Phil Daniels as Craig Dodds
- Ethan Lawrence as PC Ben Tooh, Pat's son
- Michele Austin as Camilla Wells, Samuel's wife
- Kate Dickie as Katia
- Ólafur Darri Ólafsson as the Narrator
- Adam Gillen as Vinnie Douglas
- Jonas Armstrong as Arthur
- Dominic Weatherill as Greg Lake
- Charlie Hamblett as Benoit

== Production ==
The project was announced by the BBC and Amazon Freevee in November 2022 as a six-part series, produced by Two Brothers Pictures of All3Media. Written by Harry and Jack Williams, the actors Haggard, Joseph, Daniels, Scanlan, Karyo and Fairbrass were announced as the cast. The Williams brothers direct episodes, as do Alice Troughton and Daniel Nettheim.

=== Filming ===
Filming took place on Coatham Beach, Redcar on the Yorkshire coast in November 2022. Filming also took place in Redcar, Selby, and Halifax in 2023.

== Reception ==
=== Critical reception ===
Jasper Rees in The Daily Telegraph gave the show four stars out of five, praising the performances of “likeable” Haggard and Joseph, noting that the tone swung “wildly between carefree irony and repellent savagery” and that “in the first episode, a tongue is severed with brutal nonchalance while bodies pile profligately high in a Tarantino-esque killing spree.” Nick Hilton in The Independent gave the series three stars out of five, praising Haggard as “a terrific presence”, but found the “quippy tone grating” when coupled with the violence akin to “directors like the Coen Brothers, Quentin Tarantino, and Martin McDonagh”, and “humour mixed with a blackness colour-matched from the darkest recesses of the universe”. Lucy Mangan in The Guardian also praised the performance of Haggard and gave the series five stars. Saying that she "loved it", she noted its "cleverness, style and innovation", and thought it evoked "Quentin Tarantino, Wes Anderson and the Coen brothers in its ability to mash genres together".

== Broadcast ==
Boat Story premiered on BBC One and BBC iPlayer in the United Kingdom on 19 November 2023, and was released on Amazon Freevee in the United States on 12 March 2024.

== See also ==
- Tarantinoesque film
