= Keeley Hawes =

British actress (born 1976)

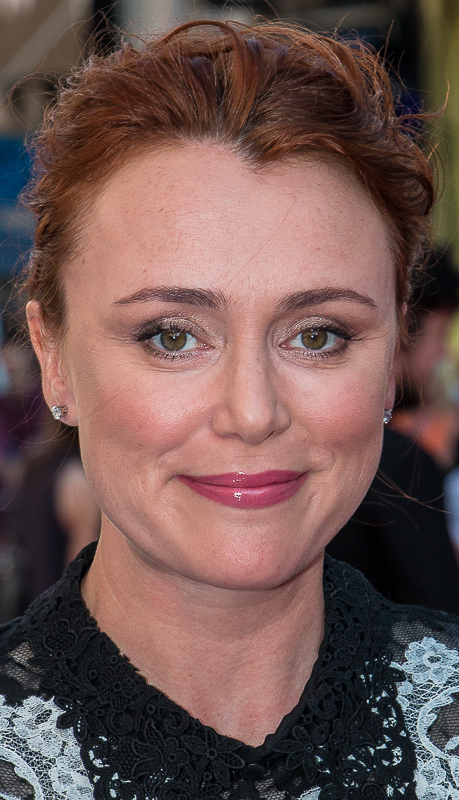
- Hawes in 2014
- Born: Clare Julia Hawes; 10 February 1976 (age 50); Paddington, London, England
- Education: Sylvia Young Theatre School
- Occupation: Actress
- Years active: 1989–present
- Spouses: Spencer McCallum (m. 2001; div. 2004) Matthew Macfadyen (m. 2004)
- Children: 3

Clare Julia "Keeley" Hawes (born 10 February 1976) is a British actress. After beginning her career in a number of literary adaptations, including Our Mutual Friend (1998) and Tipping the Velvet (2002), Hawes rose to fame for her portrayal of Zoe Reynolds in the BBC series Spooks (2002–2004), followed by her co-lead performance as DI Alex Drake in Ashes to Ashes (2008–2010). She is also known for her roles in Jed Mercurio's Line of Duty as DI Lindsay Denton (2014–2016) and in BBC One drama Bodyguard (2018), in which she played Home Secretary Julia Montague.

Hawes is a three-time BAFTA TV Award nominee, having been nominated for the British Academy Television Award for Best Actress for her roles as Lindsay Denton and Julia Montague, and a British Academy Television Award for Best Supporting Actress for her role as Dorothy Wick in the drama Mrs Wilson.

Hawes has had leading roles in the 2010 revival of Upstairs, Downstairs, the limited series The Casual Vacancy (2015), The Missing (2016), the ITV comedy-drama The Durrells (2016–2019), the Russell T Davies drama serial It's a Sin (2021), The Midwich Cuckoos (2022) and BBC America/AMC science fiction thriller Orphan Black: Echoes (2023). She has also acted as an executive producer on ITV drama Honour (2020) and comedy-drama Finding Alice (2021), starring in them both.

Hawes's film appearances include Death at a Funeral (2007), High-Rise (2015), Misbehaviour (2020) and To Olivia (2021), in which she portrays actress Patricia Neal. She has also provided the voice of Lara Croft in the Tomb Raider video games, including Tomb Raider: Legend, Tomb Raider: Anniversary, Tomb Raider: Underworld, and Lara Croft and the Guardian of Light.

== Early life and education ==
Clare Julia Hawes was born on 10 February 1976 in London, and grew up in a council flat in Marylebone. She is the youngest of four children.

Hawes attended Sylvia Young Theatre School, where she became friends with singer Emma Bunton and actress Kellie Bright. In her teenage years she worked in various part-time jobs including at Sainsbury's and McDonald's. At age 17 she was approached on Oxford Street by a modelling scout, and signed up by Select Model Management. After numerous features for teen magazine Shout, Hawes became a fashion intern for Cosmopolitan. During this period, she was first asked to audition for a film.

We're not an acting family, but my parents have always encouraged me. I'm sure my dad spreads the word about my programmes to everyone who gets in his cab, which must help the ratings!

== Career ==
Hawes first came into the public eye in the 1990s, having supporting roles in Troublemakers, Dennis Potter's Karaoke (1995), Heartbeat (1995) and The Beggar Bride (1997). Hawes's first film role was in the 1998 film The Avengers, in which she played Tamara.

Hawes appeared in several BBC adaptations of classic and modern literature, including Our Mutual Friend (1998), The Cater Street Hangman (1998), Wives and Daughters (1999) and as the young Diana Dors in the biopic The Blonde Bombshell (1999).

In the late 1990s, Hawes featured in four music videos, "Saturday Night" by Suede, "Marvellous" by The Lightning Seeds, "Come Around" by The Mutton Birds, and "She's a Star" by James.

In 2002, Hawes appeared in the BBC drama Tipping the Velvet. From 2002 to 2004, she appeared as Zoe Reynolds in the spy drama series Spooks. In 2003, she appeared in the BBC's re-telling of The Canterbury Tales. In 2006, Hawes replaced Jonell Elliott as the voice of Lara Croft in the action-adventure video game, Tomb Raider: Legend. She appeared as Rosie in the British comedy The Vicar of Dibley from 2006 to 2007. Also in 2007, Hawes appeared as Jane in the comedy Death at a Funeral. She reprised her voiceover role as Lara Croft in the video games Tomb Raider: Anniversary, a remake of the original Tomb Raider, released in 2007, followed by 2008's Tomb Raider: Underworld.

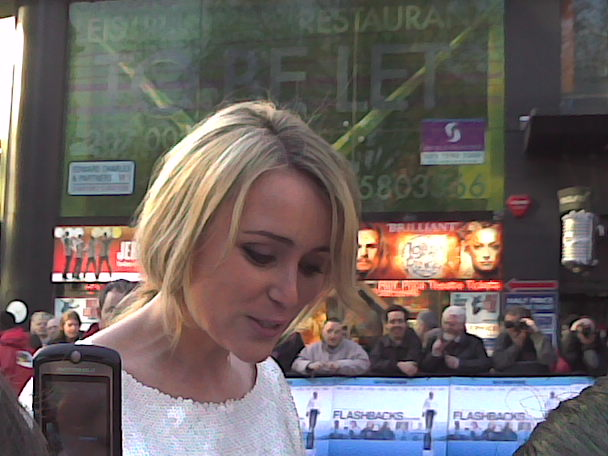
Hawes in 2008

In April 2008, Hawes began filming the BBC drama Mutual Friends, and appeared in That Mitchell and Webb Look. From 2008 to 2010, she appeared in Ashes to Ashes, the spin-off from the hit BBC series Life on Mars, as Alex Drake, a police officer in London's Metropolitan Police. For her portrayal of Alex Drake, Hawes was granted the Best UK Television Actress Award in 2008 by the Glamour Awards.

In 2009, Hawes portrayed Detective Superintendent Martha Lawson in a six-episode ITV series, Identity. The 2010 release of the isometric Tomb Raider spin-off game, Lara Croft and the Guardian of Light, again featured Hawes as the voice of Lara Croft. In December of that year, she starred as Lady Agnes Holland in the three-episode relaunch of Upstairs, Downstairs.

On 25 April 2011, Hawes narrated the documentary Kate and William: A Royal Love Story on BBC One, prior to the wedding of Prince William and Catherine Middleton. That June, she also narrated the ITV1 documentary Four of a Kind as part of ITV's Extraordinary Families season.

Hawes appeared as Catherine Mundi in 2014's fantasy adventure film Mariah Mundi and the Midas Box. She also guest-starred in 2014 as Ms. Delphox in the eighth series of Doctor Who, and returned as Lara Croft in the voiceover role for that year's release of the game Lara Croft and the Temple of Osiris. Her performance as Detective Inspector Lindsay Denton in the BBC Two drama Line of Duty (2014–2016), was described in The Daily Telegraph as "the performance of 2014", and garnered her a nomination for the BAFTA TV Award for Best Actress. In October 2014, Hawes was made an Honorary Graduate by the University of Suffolk.

From 2016 to 2019, Hawes played the main role of Louisa Durrell in ITV's popular comedy-drama The Durrells. She appeared in 2018's TV series Bodyguard, in which she played Home Secretary Julia Montague, and was nominated for a BAFTA for the role. Also in 2018, Hawes played Dorothy Wick in Mrs Wilson, opposite Iain Glen. Hawes came in at number 38 on the 2018 Radio Times TV 100 list, determined by television executives and broadcasting veterans. She has since appeared in Traitors and Summer of Rockets, both in 2019.

Hawes later played Detective Chief Inspector Caroline Goode in the 2020 miniseries Honour which was based on the real life murder of Banaz Mahmod. She also appeared in the films Misbehaviour and Rebecca that year. In 2021, Hawes co-created, served as an executive producer and starred in the ITV comedy-drama Finding Alice as Alice Dillion. It was later announced that there would be a second series. In 2021, Hawes appeared in the Russell T. Davies five-part drama It's a Sin as Valerie Tozer. The series follows five 18-year-olds who move to London in 1981 and have their lives turned upside down by the AIDS crisis. It aired on Channel 4 and on HBO Max in the United States. Critics and viewers praised her performance in the final episode as "outstanding and magnificent" and a "masterclass". Similarly, the Radio Times described her performance as "stunning" and "heartbreaking." Critics and viewers also expressed their desire for Hawes to win a BAFTA and other awards for her performance. The following month, Hawes appeared as actress Patricia Neal in 2021 film To Olivia, which revolves around her marriage to Roald Dahl and the death of their daughter.

In June 2022, Hawes appeared in a leading role as Dr. Susannah Zellaby in Sky Max science fiction horror drama The Midwich Cuckoos based on the novel of the same name. In 2024, she played Amanda Thirsk in Scoop. In 2025, Hawes starred in The Assassin, a thriller television series created by Harry and Jack Williams for Amazon Prime Video.

== Philanthropy ==
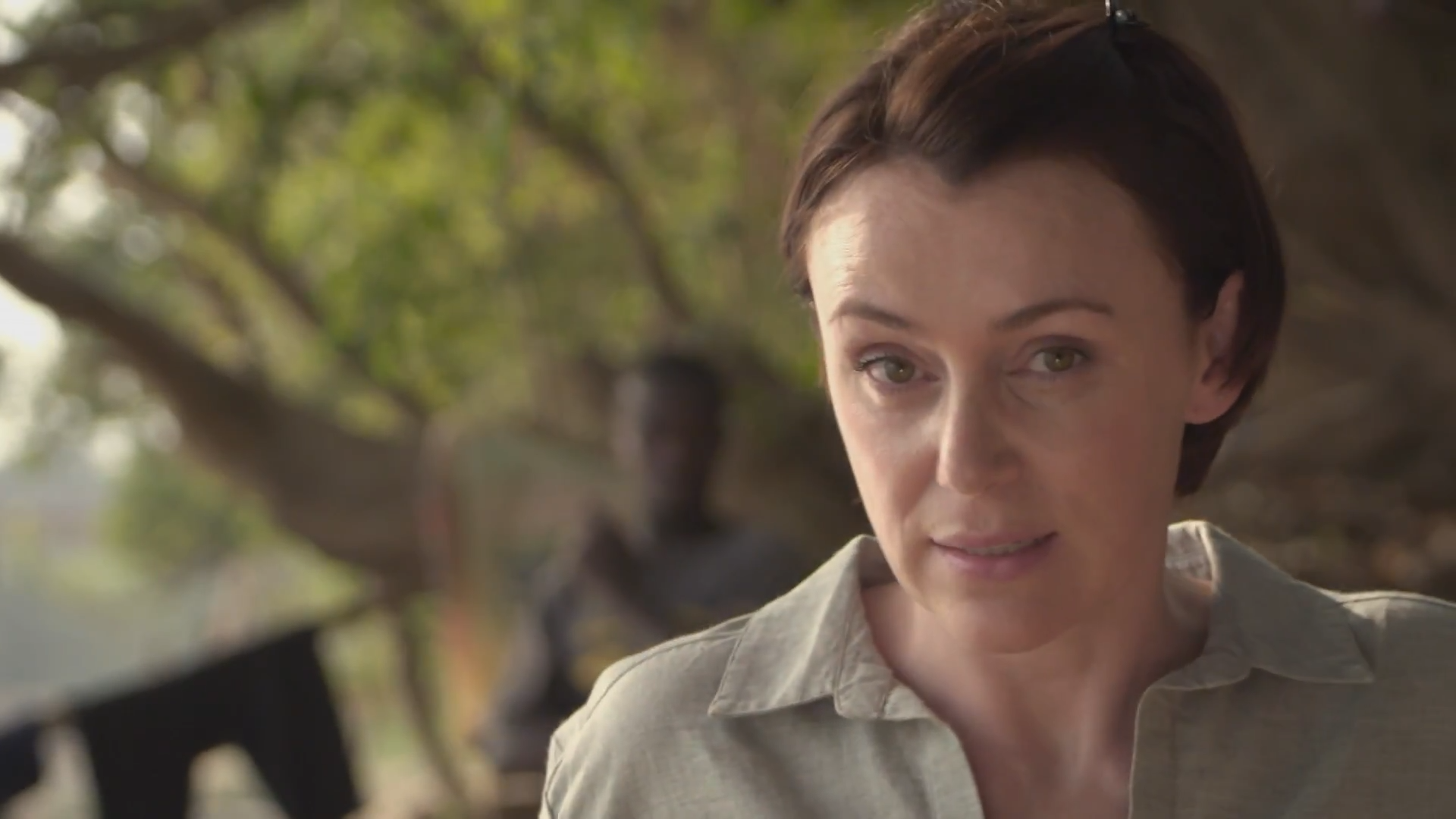
Hawes in Sierra Leone in 2018

Hawes began working with UNICEF in 2012; in 2017 she became a UNICEF ambassador. Her main focus has been visiting Syrian refugee children and families living in the Za'atari refugee camp and host communities in Amman.

== Personal life ==
Hawes married cartoonist Spencer McCallum in December 2001; their son had been born in August. She married Matthew Macfadyen, her co-star in Spooks, in November 2004 and their daughter was born the following month. Their son was born in September 2006.

== Filmography ==
Key
†	Denotes films that have not yet been released

=== Film ===
Year	Title	Role	Notes
1998	The Avengers	Tamara	
1999	The Last September	Lois Farquar	
2000	Complicity	Yvonne	
2003	Chaos and Cadavers	Samantha Taggert	
2005	A Cock and Bull Story	Elizabeth / Herself	
2007	Death at a Funeral	Jane Howells	
2008	The Bank Job	Wendy Leather	
2008	Flashbacks of a Fool	Adult Jesse Scot	
2013	The Adventurer: The Curse of the Midas Box	Catherine Mundi	
2015	High-Rise	Ann Royal	
2016	Never Land	Sarah	Short film
2020	Misbehaviour	Julia Morley	
2020	Rebecca	Beatrice	
2021	To Olivia	Patricia Neal	
2024	Scoop	Amanda Thirsk	

=== Television ===
Year	Title	Role	Notes
1989	Forever Green	Carol	Episode: "#1.3"
1989	Tricky Business	Arabella	Episode: "Bang on Time"
1990	Troublemakers	Mandy Harper	6 episodes
1992	The Ruth Rendell Mysteries	Sarah Mabledene	Episode: "Talking to Strange Men"
1994	Don't Forget Your Toothbrush	Bra Girl	Episode: "#1.9". Uncredited role
1996	Karaoke	Linda Langer	Miniseries; 4 episodes
1996	Cold Lazarus	Linda Langer	Miniseries; 1 episode
1996	Pie in the Sky	Stella Jackson	Episodes: "Devils on Horseback: Parts 1 & 2"
1996	Heartbeat	Michelle	Episode: "Snapped"
1996	The Moonstone	Rachel Verinder	Television film
1997	The Beggar Bride	Angela Harper	Miniseries; 2 episodes
1998	Our Mutual Friend	Lizzie Hexam	Miniseries; 4 episodes
1998	The Cater Street Hangman	Charlotte Ellison	Television film
1999	The Blonde Bombshell	Diana Dors (1945–1960)	Miniseries; 2 episodes
1999	Wives and Daughters	Cynthia Kirkpatrick	Miniseries; 4 episodes
2001	Hotel!	Tricia	Television film
2001	Murder in Mind	Deborah	Episode: "Sleeper"
2001	Othello	Dessie Brabant	Television film
2002	A Is for Acid	Gillian Rogers	Television film
2002	Me and Mrs Jones	Jane	Television film
2002	Tipping the Velvet	Kitty Butler	Miniseries; 3 episodes
2002–2004	Spooks	Zoe Reynolds	Main role; series 1–3; 22 episodes
2003	Lucky Jim	Christine Callaghan	Television film
2003	Canterbury Tales	Emily	Miniseries; episode: "The Knight's Tale"
2004	Sex & Lies	Kate	Television film
2004	Murdoch Mysteries	Dr. Julia Ogden	Miniseries; episodes: "Except the Dying" & "Poor Tom Is Cold"
2005	Agatha Christie's Marple	Philippa Haymes	Episode: "A Murder Is Announced"
2005	ShakespeaRe-Told	Ella Macbeth	Miniseries; episode: "Macbeth"
2005	Under the Greenwood Tree	Fancy Day	Television film
2006	The Best Man	Kate Sheldrake	2 episodes
2006	After Thomas	Nicola Graham	Television film
2006–2007	The Vicar of Dibley	Rosie Kennedy	Episodes: "The Handsome Stranger" & "The Vicar in White"
2008	Mutual Friends	Jen Grantham	6 episodes
2008–2010	Ashes to Ashes	DI Alex Drake	Main role; series 1–3; 24 episodes
2010	Identity	DSI Martha Lawson	6 episodes
2010	That Mitchell and Webb Look	Herself	Episode: "#4.1"
2010–2012	Upstairs, Downstairs	Lady Agnes Holland	Main role; series 1 & 2; 9 episodes
2013	The Lady Vanishes	Mrs. Todhunter / Laura Parmiter	Television film
2013	Ambassadors	Jennifer Davis	Miniseries; 3 episodes
2013	The Tunnel	Suze Beaumont	3 episodes
2014	Doctor Who	Ms. Delphox / Madame Karabraxos	Episode: "Time Heist"
2014–2016	Line of Duty	DI Lindsay Denton	Main role; series 2 & 3; 11 episodes
2015	The Casual Vacancy	Samantha Mollison	Miniseries; 3 episodes
2015	Fungus the Bogeyman	Wendy Snow	Sky One miniseries; 3 episodes
2016	The Hollow Crown	Queen Elizabeth	Episodes: "Henry VI Part 2" & "Richard III"
2016	The Missing	Gemma Webster	Main role; 8 episodes
2016–2019	The Durrells	Louisa Durrell	Main role; series 1–4; 26 episodes; also exec. producer (2019)
2017	Inside No. 9	Louise	Episode: "Diddle Diddle Dumpling"
2018	The Coronation	Herself - Narrator	Television documentary film
2018	Bodyguard	Home Secretary Julia Montague	Main role; 3 episodes
2018	Mrs. Wilson	Dorothy Wick	Miniseries; 3 episodes
2019	Traitors	Priscilla Garrick	Main role; 6 episodes
2019	Summer of Rockets	Kathleen Shaw	Miniseries; 6 episodes
2019	Year of the Rabbit	Lydia	Main role; miniseries; 6 episodes
2020	Honour	DCI Caroline Goode	Miniseries; 2 episodes; also exec. producer
2021	Finding Alice	Alice Dillon	Main role; 6 episodes; also creator & exec. producer
2021	It's a Sin	Valerie Tozer	Channel 4 miniseries; 5 episodes
2022	The Midwich Cuckoos	Dr. Susannah Zellaby	Sky Max series; 7 episodes
2022	Crossfire	Jo Cross	Miniseries; 3 episodes; also exec. producer
2023	Stonehouse	Barbara Smith/Stonehouse	Main role; miniseries; 3 episodes
2023	Orphan Black: Echoes	Kira Manning	Main role; 10 episodes
2025	Miss Austen	Cassandra Austen	Main role; miniseries; 4 episodes; also exec. producer
2025	The Assassin	Julie	Main role; 12 episodes; also exec. producer
2026	Falling	Anna	Main role; miniseries; 6 episodes

=== Theatre ===
Year	Title	Role	Venue
2011	Rocket to the Moon	Belle	Royal National Theatre
2013	Barking in Essex	Chrissie	Wyndham's Theatre
2024	The Human Body	Iris Elcock	Donmar Warehouse

=== Video games ===
Year	Title	Voice role
2006	Tomb Raider: Legend	Lara Croft
2007	Robin Hood's Quest	Maid Marian
2007	Spooks Interactive	Zoe Reynolds
2007	Tomb Raider: Anniversary	Lara Croft
2008	Tomb Raider: Underworld	Lara Croft
2010	Lara Croft and the Guardian of Light	Lara Croft
2014	Lara Croft and the Temple of Osiris	Lara Croft
2023	Tomb Raider Reloaded	Lara Croft
2023	Call of Duty: Modern Warfare II	Lara Croft
2025	World of Tanks	Lara Croft

== Awards and nominations ==
Year	Award	Category	Work	Result	Ref.
2008	Crime Thriller Awards	Best Actress	Ashes to Ashes	Nominated	
2009	NAVGTR Awards	Lead Performance in a Drama	Tomb Raider: Underworld	Nominated	
2009	Crime Thriller Awards	Best Actress	Ashes to Ashes	Nominated	
2010	Crime Thriller Awards	Best Actress	Ashes to Ashes and Identity	Nominated	
2014	Crime Thriller Awards	Best Actress	Line of Duty	Won	
2015	British Academy Television Awards	Best Actress	Line of Duty	Nominated	
2015	Broadcasting Press Guild Awards	Best Actress	Line of Duty	Nominated	
2017	Broadcasting Press Guild Awards	Best Actress	The Durrells, The Missing and Line of Duty	Won	
2019	Broadcasting Press Guild Awards	Best Actress	Bodyguard and Mrs. Wilson	Nominated	
2019	British Academy Television Awards	Best Actress	Bodyguard	Nominated	
2019	British Academy Television Awards	Best Supporting Actress	Mrs. Wilson	Nominated	
2019	Monte-Carlo Television Festival	Outstanding Actress in a TV Series – Drama	Bodyguard	Nominated	
2021	Edinburgh International Television Festival	Best TV Actor – Drama	It's a Sin	Nominated	
2022	RTS Programme Awards	Actor (Female)	It's a Sin	Nominated	
