= The Beggar Bride =

- Starring: Keeley Hawes; Nicholas Jones; Joe Duttine; Kacey Ainsworth; Jean Anderson
- Composer: Colin Towns
- Country of origin: United Kingdom
- Original language: English
- No. of series: 1
- No. of episodes: 2

Production
- Running time: 150 minutes

Original release
- Network: BBC1
- Release: 24 August – 25 August 1997

The Beggar Bride is a 1997 British two-part television programme adapted from the Gillian White novel of the same name.

== Overview ==
The Beggar Bride aired over two consecutive nights, in late August 1997. "All dramas require a suspension of disbelief," noted Bryn Evans in a newspaper review, "and this one needed more than most." It was released on VHS in 1999 by 2 Entertain Video.

== Cast and crew ==
=== Cast ===
- Keeley Hawes as Angela Harper
- Nicholas Jones as Sir Fabian Ormerod
- Joe Duttine as Billy Harper
- Kacey Ainsworth as Tina
- Jessica and Stephanie Foulger as the babies
- Jean Anderson as Lady Alice Hurleston
- Angela Belton as WDC Jones
- T. R. Bowen as Jerry (as Trevor Bowen)
- John Bowler as Inspector Hayes
- Elena Byers as Pandora Ormerod
- Joanna Byers as Tabitha Ormerod
- Constance Chapman as Nanny Ba Ba
- Maurice Denham as Lord Evelyn Hurleston
- Iain Easton as Robert
- Ian Easton as Robert (the chauffeur)
- Francesca Folan as Ruth Hubbard
- Miles Harvey as Aaron Teale
- Diana Kent as Ffiona Ormerod
- Richard Lintern as Callister
- Lizzie Mickery as Sandra Baines
- Georgina Sutcliffe as Laura
- Charlotte Williams as Honesty Ormerod
- Nicholas Pepworth as the wedding photographer
- Jessica Smith as Harry #2
- Johnathon as waiter

=== Crew ===
- Director: Diarmuid Lawrence
- Producer: Kate Harwood
- Executive Producer: Michael Wearing
- Script: Lizzie Mickery and Gillian White (novel)

== Music ==
- "She's a Star" by James
- "You've Got a Lot to Answer For" by Catatonia
