= Angela Black (TV series) =

British television series

- Genre: Drama; Thriller
- Created by: Harry Williams and Jack Williams
- Written by: Harry Williams and Jack Williams
- Directed by: Craig Vivieros
- Starring: Joanne Froggatt; Michiel Huisman; Samuel Adewunmi
- Country of origin: United Kingdom
- Original language: English
- No. of seasons: 1
- No. of episodes: 6

Production
- Executive producer: Harry Williams and Jack Williams
- Production location: London
- Running time: 50 minutes
- Production company: Two Brothers Pictures

Original release
- Network: ITV
- Release: 10 October – 14 November 2021

Angela Black is a six-part thriller series, created and written by Harry Williams and Jack Williams, which began airing on ITV on 10 October 2021, in six weekly installments. The show is produced by ITV in conjunction with Two Brothers Pictures.

== Synopsis ==
The series stars Joanne Froggatt as Angela Meyer, a wife and mother of two who is in an abusive relationship with her husband Olivier (Michiel Huisman). One day, she is approached by a mysterious man, Ed Harrison (Samuel Adewunmi), who claims that Olivier has hired him to kill her. The pair form an unlikely relationship, and try to turn the tables on Olivier.

== Cast ==
- Joanne Froggatt as Angela Meyer
- Michiel Huisman as Olivier Meyer
- Samuel Adewunmi as Ed Harrison/Theo Walters
- Seth Stokes as Max Meyer; Angela and Olivier's son
- Clement Stokes as Sam Meyer; Angela and Olivier's son
- Ashley McGuire as Judy; Angela's boss
- Pippa Nixon as PC Claire Chappelhow
- Zora Bishop as Nasrin (Episodes 4 and 5)
- Joe Coen as Chris (Episodes 4 and 5)
- Lara Rossi as Gwen (Episodes 5 and 6)
- Sara Houghton as Marissa; a friend of the Meyer family

== Episodes ==
No.	Title	Directed by	Written by	Original release date	U.K viewers (millions)
1	"Episode 1"	Craig Viveiros	Harry Williams and Jack Williams	10 October 2021	6.75
Four months after he last assaulted his wife, Olivier Meyer strikes again. This time, he leaves her with a missing tooth and facial bruising, all because he feels she embarrassed him at a dinner party earlier that evening. The next day, while walking the children to school, his wife, Angela, is approached by a strange man who claims that Olivier has hired him to follow her, and that he has been doing so for the past two months. Angela dismisses the man as a crank, despite his claims that Olivier has hired him to gather evidence to submit for divorce proceedings. Later that evening, the man, claiming to be Ed Harrison, visits Angela at home and claims the stakes have been raised - Olivier wants her dead.
2	"Episode 2"	Craig Viveiros	Harry Williams and Jack Williams	17 October 2021	6.54
Ed tries to convince Angela to work with him, using the disappearance of one of Olivier's former work colleagues, Yuki, as leverage. Ed reveals that Olivier and Yuki were having an affair, and tries to convince Angela to look in Olivier's briefcase, which pertains to contain evidence confirming this. Angela manages to do so, and is shocked to find a letter and a suggestive picture of Yuki. As the distance in Angela and Olivier's relationship grows, Ed reaches out to Angela with a proposition - to kill Olivier before he kills her.
3	"Episode 3"	Craig Viveiros	Harry Williams and Jack Williams	24 October 2021	6.45
Angela and Ed put their plan to murder Olivier into action. Angela drugs Olivier with a sleeping pill, and leaves him in bed while Ed sneaks in to the house, on the pretence of being an armed intruder. Angela escapes to the safety of a neighbour, while Ed does the deed. Angela phones 999, but on her return to the house, is shocked to find Olivier alive and Ed nowhere to be found. The following night, Ed telephones Angela and informs her that Olivier has discovered they tried to murder him, and advises her to run. Before she can leave, Olivier arrives with the police in tow, and Angela is arrested. In interview, she discovers that the events of the past few days have been the subject of a thriller novel by an author, "Ed Harrison", and that all evidence pointing towards the real Ed's involvement has been cleverly wiped or edited.
4	"Episode 4"	Craig Viveiros	Harry Williams and Jack Williams	31 October 2021	6.11
5	"Episode 5"	Craig Viveiros	Harry Williams and Jack Williams	7 November 2021	5.96
6	"Episode 6"	Craig Viveiros	Harry Williams and Jack Williams	14 November 2021	5.79

== Production ==
Filming for the series began in London in October 2020. All six episodes of the series premiered exclusively on BritBox in the UK before their linear broadcast. Internationally, the series has aired on Stan in Australia, Spectrum Original in the United States, and via Globoplay in Brazil.
