= Maya (2026 TV series) =

Upcoming British television series

- Genre: Thriller
- Created by: Daisy Haggard
- Written by: Daisy Haggard
- Directed by: Daisy Haggard; Jamie Donoughue
- Starring: Bella Ramsey; Daisy Haggard
- Country of origin: United Kingdom
- Original language: English

Production
- Executive producers: Daisy Haggard; Jamie Donoughue; Harry Williams; Jack Williams; Sarah Hammond; Alex Mercer; Daisy Mount
- Producer: Kenny Tanner
- Cinematography: Si Bell
- Production companies: All3Media; Two Brothers Pictures

Original release
- Network: Channel 4 (UK); Starz (U.S.)

Maya is an upcoming thriller television series on Channel 4 and Starz starring Bella Ramsey and Daisy Haggard. The six-part series is written by Haggard, who is co-directing with Jamie Donoughue.

== Premise ==
Maya (Bella Ramsey), a teenage girl, and her mother Anna (Daisy Haggard) are placed in a witness protection programme after fleeing their lives in London to escape a life-threatening danger. Leaving behind Anna’s parents, Nancy (Harriet Walter) and George (Tom Courtenay), the mother-daughter duo are relocated to a remote Scottish village under new identities, attempting to start again.

They are aided in their adjustment by Senior Detective Constable Debs (Josie Walker) and witness protection officers Tony (Stuart Bowman) and Karen (Kiran Sonia Sawar). But their efforts to rebuild are haunted by the emotional trauma of their past and the relentless pursuit of two hitmen, Benji (Ben Chaplin) and Ted (Raphel Famotibe). As the danger escalates, it becomes clear that a calculating figure from their past, the seemingly charming Bobby (Tobias Menzies), remains a looming and very present threat.

== Cast ==
- Bella Ramsey as Maya
- Daisy Haggard as Anna
- Harriet Walter as Nancy
- Tom Courtenay as George
- Josie Walker as Debs
- Stuart Bowman as Tony
- Kiran Sonia Sawar as Karen
- Ben Chaplin as Benji
- Raphel Famotibe as Ted
- Tobias Menzies as Bobby
- Jessica Cameron as Baby Maya

== Production ==
=== Development ===
Channel 4 announced that it had commissioned Maya in February 2025. The series is produced by Two Brothers Pictures. The project marks Haggard's directorial debut. Kenny Tanner is the scripted producer. Haggard and British director Jamie Donoughue serve as executive producers alongside Harry and Jack Williams, Sarah Hammond, Alex Mercer, and Daisy Mount for Two Brothers Pictures.

Ollie Madden, director of Film4 and Channel 4 Drama, have said that “Daisy’s pilot script for Maya had us laughing with its British take on parenting and the oddities of witness protection schemes - whilst being gripping in its no-holds barred storytelling. We are fans of both Daisy and the team at Two Brothers and can’t wait to see this series come to life.”

On 1 July 2026, Starz boarded the series as a co-production partner. Per Deadline, Maya will be a flagship upcoming Channel 4 drama being leveraged as part of the Disney+ partnership. It will gain an additional distribution platform and access to Disney+'s UK and Irish subscriber base, while remaining part of Channel 4's programming offering.

=== Casting ===
Haggard immediately pictured Bella Ramsey in the lead role when she conceived of the series, writing the part with Ramsey in mind. Ramsey and Haggard previously portrayed daughter-mother roles in the Netflix animated series Hilda.

In September 2025, the ensemble cast members were announced: Harriet Walter, Tom Courtenay, Josie Walker, Stuart Bowman, Ben Chaplin, Raphel Famotibe, Serena Manteghi, Tobias Menzies, Archie Backhouse, Paul Blair, Sonny Poon Tip, Finlay Shack, Max Fincham, Ash Hunter, Harry Hadden-Paton, Tori Allen-Martin, and Isabele Derosa.

=== Filming ===
Production took place in Scotland. A shop in Dalmuir closed for filming on September 8, 2025. The film crew also shot various scenes on Gourock Ferry Terminal, in Giffnock and Newton Mearns, and in the streets of Glasgow and Dennistoun. Filming wrapped in the first week of December 2025.

== Release ==
The six-episode series is expected to premiere on Channel 4 in 2026.

== Reception ==
The Standard and the Irish Independent named Maya as one of 2026's most anticipated TV shows. The Independent listed Maya as one of the "20 TV shows that everybody will be talking about" in 2026. italktelly called Maya one of the shows "to look forward to on television in 2026." The Guardian also listed Maya as "must see TV" in 2026. Deadline said it is the "buzziest show" at the 2026 London TV Screenings and "Haggard and Ramsey will make this one worth watching".
