= Baptiste (TV series) =

British TV drama series

- Genre: Psychological drama; Mystery thriller
- Created by: Harry Williams; Jack Williams
- Written by: Harry Williams; Jack Williams; Kelly Jones; Catherine Moulton
- Directed by: Börkur Sigþórsson; Jan Matthys; Thomas Napper; Hong Khaou
- Starring: Tchéky Karyo; Tom Hollander; Jessica Raine; Clare Calbraith; Trystan Gravelle; Anastasia Hille; Alec Secăreanu; Nicholas Woodeson
- Theme music composer: Dominik Scherrer
- Composer: Dominik Scherrer
- Country of origin: United Kingdom
- Original language: English
- No. of seasons: 2
- No. of episodes: 12

Production
- Executive producers: Christopher Aird; Tommy Bulfin; Harry Williams; Jack Williams
- Producer: John Griffin
- Production locations: Season 1: Netherlands, Belgium; Season 2: Hungary
- Production company: Two Brothers Pictures

Original release
- Network: BBC One
- Release: 17 February 2019 – 22 August 2021

Related
- The Missing

Baptiste is a British television drama series starring Tchéky Karyo as Julien Baptiste, a character that originated in the series The Missing. The spinoff is produced by Two Brothers Pictures and distributed worldwide by their parent company All3Media. The first series, set in Amsterdam, was broadcast on BBC One starting in February 2019 and is written by Harry and Jack Williams, who also wrote The Missing. A second series, set in Budapest, began on BBC One on 18 July 2021.

== Synopsis of first series ==
The show uses one of the central characters from the TV series, The Missing, the detective Julien Baptiste, played by Tchéky Karyo. Baptiste's wife and daughter are played by the same actors from The Missing; otherwise, all other characters and actors starring in the programme are new.

After having an operation on his brain tumour, Julien Baptiste claims he is not the man he once was. His former boss persuades him to help the Dutch police look for a missing 15-year-old enslaved sex worker in Amsterdam. While looking, he meets Edward Stratton, the uncle of the missing girl. All is not as it seems with Edward and the show also introduces Kim Vogel, who has a criminal history and Constantin, a Romanian national who is seen murdering and dismembering a victim at the start of the programme.

== Cast ==
=== Main ===
- Tchéky Karyo as Julien Baptiste
- Tom Hollander as Edward Stratton (series 1)
- Clare Calbraith as Clare
- Talisa Garcia as Kim Vogel (series 1)
- Trystan Gravelle as Greg
- Anastasia Hille as Celia Baptiste
- Anna Próchniak as Natalie Rose
- Barbara Sarafian as Martha Horchner
- Alec Secăreanu as Constantin (series 1)
- Nicholas Woodeson as Peter
- Boris Van Severen as Niels Horchner
- Jessica Raine as Genevieve Taylor (series 1)
- Zachary Baharov as Nicolae (series 1)
- Fiona Shaw as Emma Chambers (series 2)
- Gabriella Hámori as Kamilla Agoston (series 2)
- Stuart Campbell as Alex Chambers (series 2)
- Conrad Khan as Will Chambers (series 2)
- Dorka Gryllus as Zsófia Arslan (series 2)
- Miklós Béres as Andras Juszt (series 2)

=== Recurring ===
- Gijs de Lange as Herman (series 1)
- Camille Schotte as Sara Baptiste
- Omar Baroud as Ron (series 1)
- Martha Canga Antonio as Lina (series 1)

== Episodes ==
Series	Episodes	Originally released	
Series	Episodes	First released	Last released
1	6	17 February 2019	24 March 2019
2	6	18 July 2021	22 August 2021

=== Series 1 (2019) ===
No. overall	No. in series	Title	Directed by	Written by	Original release date	UK viewers (millions)
1	1	"Shell"	Börkur Sigþórsson	Harry Williams & Jack Williams	17 February 2019	9.17
A meter reader kills a man in the English seaside town of Deal, Kent. While Julien Baptiste is in Amsterdam with his family, an old friend, Martha, from the Dutch police, asks him to search for a missing sex worker, Natalie Rose. He meets Edward Stratton, who claims to be Natalie's uncle, and the two men delve into the criminal underworld of Amsterdam's red light district. The meter reader turns up in a seedy Amsterdam pool hall and later 'bumps' into Baptiste's wife and grand daughter at the supermarket. Baptiste notices a street kid following him and Stratton who tells them about the "Dream Room" brothel. A Dutch tulip farmer finds a pendant and silver chain on his field. Baptiste takes a call that leads them to Kim Vogel, a woman who runs a cafe and a 'collective' for sex workers and directs them to Germany. Martha e-mails Baptiste information about Dragomir Zelincu and Baptiste revisits Kim Vogel, who gives him Natalie's location. At the tulip farm, the farmer's dog digs up something at the end of a tulip row.
2	2	"Measure of a Man"	Börkur Sigþórsson	Harry Williams & Jack Williams	24 February 2019	7.98
With help from Kim Vogel, Julien finds Natalie, who reveals that Edward is not her uncle, but a client. Julien goes to Edward's address in Antwerp and finds the severed head of the man from Deal hidden in the house.
3	3	"For Blood"	Börkur Sigþórsson	Harry Williams & Jack Williams	3 March 2019	7.86
Julien confronts Edward, who tells him that the head is that of his father, who has been murdered by Romanian gangsters belonging to the Brigada Serbilu, after Edward helped Natalie to steal some money that they were laundering. Julien sends his own family into hiding, while he continues to work on the case with help from Niels, a young Dutch detective, who is Martha's son.
4	4	"Vertrouwen"	Jan Matthys	Harry Williams & Jack Williams	10 March 2019	7.55
Kim Vogel is murdered. Julien goes in pursuit of the stolen money while Genevieve, a British detective, coerces Edward to meet Constantin, the gangsters' spokesman. When the money is discovered, Edward gives Julien the slip and returns to the UK. Martha confesses to Julien that Niels is his natural son.
5	5	"Lucy"	Jan Matthys	Kelly Jones	17 March 2019	7.36
Having tracked Edward down, Julien and Genevieve conceive an audacious plan to turn Constantin and bring down the Brigada. Julien begins negotiations with Constantin, but the Brigada murder Constantin in Amsterdam for having misappropriated their money. They track down Edward's ex-wife and murder her and her partner; Edward manages to turn the tables on the assassin, but Julien realises that someone in the Dutch police has betrayed them.
6	6	"Into the Sand"	Jan Matthys	Harry Williams & Jack Williams	24 March 2019	7.18
Edward finds evidence against the Brigada among Kim's belongings. Niels is revealed to have been secretly working for the Brigada, and goes on the run. When Julien, Genevieve and the police catch up with him, he takes Martha hostage and kills her.

=== Series 2 (2021) ===
No. overall	No. in series	Title	Directed by	Written by	Original release date	UK viewers (millions)
7	1	"Episode 1"	Thomas Napper	Harry Williams & Jack Williams	18 July 2021	7.95
Told in flashback, Julien Baptiste travels to Hungary to help the British ambassador, Emma Chambers, find her missing family, who vanished while they were on vacation. When her husband's body is found, the pressure is on to save Emma's two sons, Alex and Will. Baptiste finds a witness overlooked by the police, who admits to seeing a man with a tattoo on his neck driving away shortly after.
8	2	"Episode 2"	Thomas Napper	Harry Williams & Jack Williams	25 July 2021	5.19
9	3	"Episode 3"	Hong Khaou	Harry Williams & Jack Williams	1 August 2021	4.33
Baptiste suspects the abductors are far-right, anti-immigration extremists led by a figure known online as Gomorrah. Emma discovers that Alex was communicating online with a mysterious girl, and she and Baptiste investigate where they had planned to meet. While the right-wing politician Kamilla Agaston gives a speech, masked terrorists conduct a mass shooting in Budapest's immigrant neighbourhood, leaving Emma paralysed from the waist down. Baptiste kills one of the masked gunmen, only to discover that it is Alex.
10	4	"Episode 4"	Hong Khaou	Harry Williams & Jack Williams	8 August 2021	3.82
Fourteen months after the shooting, Baptiste's wife has divorced him and Zsófia has been fired as a scapegoat. Kamilla's British husband, Michael, is initially identified as Gomorrah. After questioning him, Baptiste suspects that Gomorrah is really Kamilla and that she knows where Will is. They follow her and discover she has left a duffel-bag full of cash in an abandoned farmhouse, and the person who arrives to pick it up is discovered to be Will.
11	5	"Episode 5"	Hong Khaou	Catherine Moulton	15 August 2021	2.88
Emma is shocked to discover that Will, who was radicalised after the murder of his sister by an immigrant, was preparing another terrorist attack. Will claims he was held in Kamilla's basement but Baptiste is suspicious, as there is no lock on her basement door. He realises that Andras Juszt is Gomorrah. Will escapes and is picked up by Andras.
12	6	"Episode 6"	Hong Khaou	Harry Williams & Jack Williams	22 August 2021	2.92
While Will prepares to martyr himself in another attack, Andras instead attempts to beat Will to death at their hideout in order to blame immigrants for his murder. Baptiste confronts Andras at the hideout, and the two engage in a fight. Andras stabs Baptiste, who only suffers minor injuries; Baptiste succeeds in beating him unconscious with a rock. Andras is arrested and imprisoned. Emma confesses Alex's involvement in the terrorist attack to the public. She encourages Baptiste to return to France and his wife and granddaughter. Will survives but is in a coma.

== Production ==
The BBC announced in April 2018 that a spin-off from its successful The Missing series would go into production and was set to be broadcast in 2019.

Most of the action for the first series was set in Amsterdam in the Netherlands; although some exterior scenes were shot there, some were actually filmed in Antwerp and Ghent in Belgium. Additionally, a handful of scenes were shot in Deal, Kingsdown, Ramsgate and Sandwich, all in Kent, England.

The first series consisted of six episodes, all being broadcast on a Sunday evening.

A second and final series began on BBC One on 18 July 2021.

== Reception ==
Carol Midgley writing in The Times, gave the first episode three out of five and declared the first 45 minutes to be "underwhelming", though the last 15 minutes picked up and left her "semi-intrigued". The Guardian described the programme as a "slowburning spin-off" and "the opener draws you into a darkly compelling plot".

The Daily Telegraph described the first series as "worth sticking with" and gave it three out of five.

Stuart Jeffries of The Guardian gave the second series four out of five.
