= Two Brothers Pictures =

British television production company

Two Brothers Pictures Ltd.
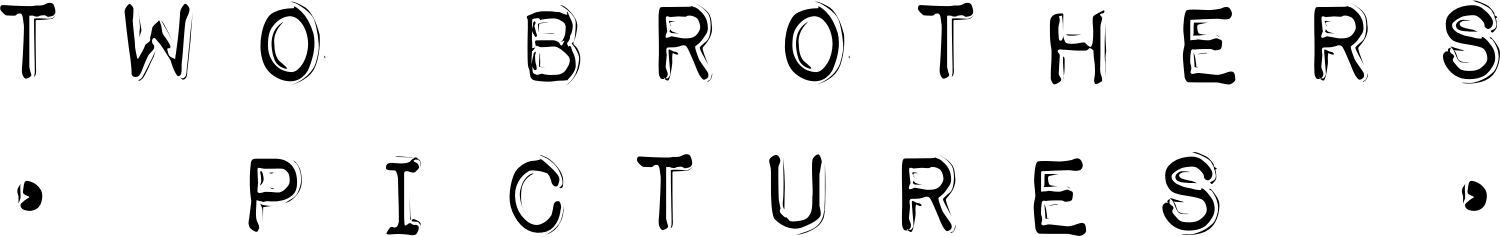
- Type: Subsidiary
- Industry: Television
- Founded: 2014; 12 years ago
- Founders: Harry and Jack Williams
- Headquarters: London, England
- Key people: Harry and Jack Williams (Writers and Managing Directors); Michael Latif (Chief Operating Officer); Sarah Hammond (Chief Creative Officer)
- Services: Production company
- Parent: All3Media (2017–2026); Banijay UK (2026–present)
- Website: twobrotherspictures.com

Two Brothers Pictures is a British television production company founded in 2014 by brothers Harry and Jack Williams. The company launched with the BBC One series The Missing. The show was nominated for two Golden Globe Awards, four BAFTAs and two Emmys as well as winning two Nymph d'Ors, Bulldog, and BPG awards.

== History ==
In 2016, Two Brothers Pictures launched their comedy, Fleabag, on BBC Three and Amazon, written by and starring Phoebe Waller-Bridge. Fleabag's first series received numerous awards, including; BAFTA TV (Female Performance in a Comedy), Televisual (Best Comedy), Writers Guild of Great Britain (Best TV Sitcom), RTS (Best Breakthrough, Best Comedy Writer), Chortle (Best TV Comedy), BPG (Best Writer), Broadcast (Best Multichannel, Best Original Programme) and NME (Best TV Series).

In 2016, Claire Evans joined as chief operating officer. Two Brothers Pictures joined the All3Media Group in 2017.

Other programs include Liar, conspiracy thriller Strangers (originally titled White Dragon), Cheat and The Widow for ITV, and Rellik, Baptiste for BBC One and The Tourist for Stan and BBC One.

In 2025, the Two Brothers Pictures released The Assassin (TV series) for Amazon Video. In 2026, season 2 has been ordered with Harry and Jack Williams returning to executive produce. Deadline reported in July 2026 that season 2 landed a host of international buyers attached.

In 2026, the production company will release Maya, a six part drama starring Daisy Haggard and Bella Ramsey on Channel 4 and Starz.

A television adaptation of British videogame, Atomfall, is being developed as a co-production between Two Brothers and Rebellion. Harry and Jack Williams, will write the TV drama, as reported by Deadline in April 2026.

In June 2026, Sarah Hammond, previously an executive producer, has been elevated to chief creative officer. Latif has stepped into the role of chief operating officer. Deadline reported that Two Brothers Pictures will produce the action-comedy, Danger Money, with Prime Video.

== Filmography ==
Year	Title	Aired on
2014–2016	The Missing	BBC One / Starz
2015	Fried	BBC Three
2016–2019	Fleabag	BBC Three / Amazon Prime Video
2016	One of Us	BBC One
2017–2020	Liar	ITV
2017	Rellik	BBC One
2017	Urban Myths: Cary Grant and Timothy Leary	Sky Arts
2018	Strangers	ITV / Amazon Prime Video
2018	Wonderdate	BBC iPlayer
2019–2021	Baptiste	BBC One
2019	The Widow	ITV / Amazon Video
2019	Cheat	ITV
2019–2021	Back to Life	BBC Three
2021	Angela Black	ITV / Spectrum
2022–2024	The Tourist	BBC One / Stan
2023	Boat Story	BBC One
2024–present	Dinosaur	BBC Scotland / Hulu
2025–present	The Assassin	Amazon Prime Video
2026	Maya	Channel 4/Starz
TBA	Atomfall	TBA
TBA	Danger Money	Amazon Prime Video
