= The Missing (British TV series) =

2014 British television drama

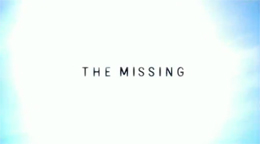
- Genre: Psychological drama; Mystery thriller
- Created by: Harry Williams; Jack Williams
- Written by: Harry Williams; Jack Williams
- Directed by: Tom Shankland (Series 1); Ben Chanan (Series 2)
- Starring: James Nesbitt; Frances O'Connor; Ken Stott; Jason Flemyng; Arsher Ali; Saïd Taghmaoui; Titus De Voogdt; Émilie Dequenne; Eric Godon; Anastasia Hille; Tchéky Karyo; David Morrissey; Keeley Hawes; Roger Allam; Laura Fraser; Lia Williams; Abigail Hardingham; Jake Davies; Ólafur Darri Ólafsson; Florian Bartholomai; Filip Peeters; Derek Riddell
- Theme music composer: Amatorski
- Opening theme: "Come Home"
- Composer: Dominik Scherrer
- Country of origin: United Kingdom
- Original language: English
- No. of series: 2
- No. of episodes: 16

Production
- Executive producers: John Yorke; Harry Williams; Jack Williams; Jan Vrints; Elaine Pyke; Charles Pattinson; Polly Hill; Eurydice Gysel; Willow Grylls; Colin Callender
- Producers: Chris Clough (Series 1); Julian Stevens (Series 2)
- Cinematography: Ole Bratt Birkeland
- Editor: Úna Ní Dhonghaíle
- Running time: 60 minutes
- Production companies: New Pictures; Company Pictures; Two Brothers Pictures; Playground Entertainment

Original release
- Network: BBC One
- Release: 28 October 2014 – 30 November 2016

Related
- Baptiste

The Missing is a British anthology drama written by brothers Harry and Jack Williams. It was first broadcast in the UK on BBC One on 28 October 2014. The first eight-part series, about the search for a missing boy in France, was directed by Tom Shankland. It stars Tchéky Karyo as Julien Baptiste, the French detective who leads the case, with James Nesbitt and Frances O'Connor as the boy's parents.

The second eight-part series, about a missing girl in Germany, was directed by Ben Chanan. It was broadcast in the UK, on BBC One, from 12 October 2016. Tchéky Karyo returns as Julien Baptiste, with David Morrissey and Keeley Hawes as the girl's parents.

Both series received positive reviews, with critics praising the cast, especially Tchéky Karyo's performance, and the storytelling. In February 2019, a spin-off series titled Baptiste was broadcast on BBC One, again starring Karyo and written by Jack and Harry Williams.

== Series one ==
=== Production ===
Filming began in February 2014 with help from the Belgian government's tax shelter scheme. The series was co-produced by New Pictures, Company Pictures, Two Brothers Pictures and Playground Entertainment with Fortis Film Fund, Czar TV Productions and Vlaamse Radio- en Televisieomroeporganisatie. The distributor was All3Media who sold the series at MIPCOM. The series producer was Chris Clough and the executive producers were Charlie Pattinson, Willow Grylls and Elaine Pyke for New Pictures, John Yorke for Company Pictures, Harry and Jack Williams for Two Brothers Pictures, Polly Hill for the BBC, Colin Callender for Playground Entertainment and Eurydice Gysel for Czar TV Productions. The Missing was commissioned by Charlotte Moore and Ben Stephenson for BBC One.

Although the first story is set in France and the United Kingdom, most of the scenes were filmed in Huy, Halle, Charleroi and Brussels, Belgium, taking advantage of the Belgian Tax Shelter for film funding. Only a few scenes were shot in Paris and London.

=== Synopsis ===
Tony Hughes, his wife Emily and their five-year-old son Oliver, are travelling from the United Kingdom to northern France for a holiday. It is the summer of 2006, during the FIFA World Cup. Soon after entering France, their car breaks down. They are forced to spend the night in the fictional small town of Châlons du Bois. That evening, Tony and Oliver visit a crowded outdoor bar, where a quarter-finals football match is being watched. Tony loses sight of his son, who goes missing. Businessman Ian Garrett offers a reward for information leading to Oliver's capture, but it later emerges that, on discovering that Garrett is a paedophile, Tony beat Garrett to death and concealed the evidence.

Eight years later, Oliver has not been found; the police have closed their investigation. Now divorced, Tony has continued to search for his son after seeing a recent photograph in which a little boy is wearing a scarf identical to the one Oliver was wearing on the day he disappeared and made for him with a unique insignia. Tony contacts Julien Baptiste, the retired detective who led the original investigation, and they discover where Oliver was kept prisoner after his initial disappearance. The police are persuaded by Baptiste to reopen the case, but the investigation is hampered by the disappearance of a piece of evidence, given by a corrupt police officer to a journalist. Baptiste recovers the evidence of Garrett's murder but gives it to Tony, who he feels has already suffered enough. Eventually the pair discover that Oliver was killed shortly after his disappearance, but no one survives who can tell them what happened to his body. Emily makes a fresh start by remarrying, but Tony cannot accept that Oliver is dead, and continues to search.

=== Cast ===
- James Nesbitt as Tony Hughes, father of the missing boy, Oliver Hughes. Tony feels partly responsible for his disappearance and has therefore devoted his life to finding his son.
- Frances O'Connor as Emily Hughes, mother of Oliver and wife of Tony in 2006. Emily is devastated by the disappearance of her son and her relationship with Tony breaks down, leading her to start a relationship with detective Mark Walsh, to whom she is engaged in 2014.
- Tchéky Karyo as Julien Baptiste, lead detective on Oliver's case. Julien rejoins Tony when they find further evidence in 2014, but is still scarred by past events. His daughter is a drug addict who refuses his help regularly.
- Jason Flemyng as Mark Walsh; an English detective holidaying in Châlons De Bois in 2006. He starts a relationship with Emily.
- Ken Stott as Ian Garrett; a property developer constructing his family holiday home near Châlons De Bois. Ian becomes a benefactor for the Hughes but holds dark secrets that could be linked to Oliver's disappearance.
- Diana Quick as Mary Garrett; Ian's wife, still scarred by the disappearance of her own daughter years ago.
- Arsher Ali as Malik Suri; an English journalist who is determined to make his big break by any means. By bribing corrupt detective Khalid Ziane, he has obtained evidence that could lead to Oliver's killer.
- Titus De Voogdt as Vincent Bourg; who is living near Châlons De Bois in 2006. He is the police's first suspect due to his reputation as a paedophile, and ends up setting out to 'cure' himself of his obsession.
- Saïd Taghmaoui as Khalid Ziane; a corrupt police officer who hands vital evidence to Malik Suri and later resorts to violence to cover up his actions.
- Anastasia Hille as Celia Baptiste; Julien's wife who is devastated by her daughter's addiction.
- Oliver Hunt as Oliver Hughes; the Hughes' young son who vanishes on their holiday in 2006.
- Jean-François Wolff as Alain Deloix; the owner of Hotel Eden, the hotel where the Hughes are staying in Châlons De Bois. He is a recovering alcoholic.
- Eric Godon as Georges Deloix; Alain's brother and the Mayor of Châlons De Bois, who continually stops the police from reopening the case in 2014.
- Émilie Dequenne as Laurence Relaud
- Astrid Whettnall as Sylvie Deloix
- Anamaria Marinca as Rini Dalca
- Johan Leysen as Karl Sieg
- Camille Schotte as Sara Baptiste; Julien Baptiste's daughter, suffering from addiction
- Anjli Mohindra as Amara Suri, Malik's wife
- Joséphine de La Baume as Monique Pelletier, an artist who starts a relationship with Tony.

== Series two ==
=== Production ===
The second series was confirmed in December 2014 and production began in February 2016. Again written by Harry and Jack Williams, this series was directed by Ben Chanan. The filming locations were Morocco, Belgium (Malmedy, Brussels & Ghent) and Germany. Episode four shows a Hanover hospital (which was filmed in Az Sint-Lucas Ghent) and episode five shows soldiers marching over the Vesdre dam in eastern Belgium, and the fictional Vaaren in Switzerland is Monschau, in Germany.

=== Synopsis ===
The story is paralleled by flashbacks to 2014 and is set near a British army garrison in Eckhausen, Germany. In 2014 police tell Sam and Gemma Webster, whose daughter Alice went missing in 2003, that Alice has reappeared and claims she had been held captive with Sophie Giroux, a French girl who disappeared about the same time. Retired French detective Julien Baptiste, who was in charge of the Giroux investigation, cannot resist becoming involved again and travels to Germany and Iraq to find answers.

=== Cast ===
- David Morrissey as Captain Sam Webster
- Keeley Hawes as Gemma Webster, Sam's wife
- Tchéky Karyo as Julien Baptiste
- Anastasia Hille as Celia Baptiste, Julien's wife
- Roger Allam as Brigadier Adrian Stone
  - Thomas Arnold as young Adrian
- Laura Fraser as Sergeant Eve Stone, Adrian's daughter
- Abigail Hardingham as Alice Webster / Sophie Giroux
  - Madi Linnard as young Alice
  - Eulalie Trillet as young Sophie
  - Chelsea Edge as real Alice Webster
- Jake Davies as Matthew Webster, Sam and Gemma's son
- Ólafur Darri Ólafsson as Stefan Andersen
- Filip Peeters as Kristian Herz, a butcher
- Lia Williams as Nadia Herz, Kristian's wife
- Derek Riddell as Major Adam Gettrick, Press Officer
- Florian Bartholomäi as Jorn Lenhart
- Brian Bovell as Lieutenant Colonel Henry Reed
  - Dempsey Bovell as young Henry
- Daniel Ezra as Trooper Daniel Reed, Henry's son
- Diana Kent as Penny
- Indica Watson as Lucy

== Episodes ==
Series	Episodes	Originally released		Avg. UK viewers (millions)
Series	Episodes	First released	Last released	Avg. UK viewers (millions)
1	8	28 October 2014	16 December 2014	7.37
2	8	12 October 2016	30 November 2016	8.06

=== Series 1 (2014) ===
No. overall	No. in series	Title	Directed by	Written by	Original release date	UK viewers (millions)
1	1	"Eden"	Tom Shankland	Harry Williams & Jack Williams	28 October 2014	6.28
2	2	"Pray for Me"	Tom Shankland	Harry Williams & Jack Williams	4 November 2014	7.66
3	3	"The Meeting"	Tom Shankland	Harry Williams & Jack Williams	11 November 2014	7.68
4	4	"Gone Fishing"	Tom Shankland	Harry Williams & Jack Williams	18 November 2014	7.12
5	5	"Molly"	Tom Shankland	Harry Williams & Jack Williams	25 November 2014	7.30
6	6	"Concrete"	Tom Shankland	Harry Williams & Jack Williams	2 December 2014	6.88
7	7	"Return to Eden"	Tom Shankland	Harry Williams & Jack Williams	9 December 2014	7.33
8	8	"Till Death"	Tom Shankland	Harry Williams & Jack Williams	16 December 2014	8.70

=== Series 2 (2016) ===
No. overall	No. in series	Title	Directed by	Written by	Original release date	UK viewers (millions)
9	1	"Come Home"	Ben Chanan	Harry Williams & Jack Williams	12 October 2016	9.20
In 2003 Alice Webster is abducted in Germany, where her father is stationed on a British Army base. In 2014, just before Christmas, a barefoot and traumatised Alice re-appears in the same town, suffering from acute appendicitis. She claims that she was held captive with a French girl, Sophie Giroux, who went missing around the same time. Retired French detective Julien Baptiste, an expert on the Giroux case, investigates. He suspects that she may not be Alice.
10	2	"The Turtle and the Stick"	Ben Chanan	Harry Williams & Jack Williams	19 October 2016	8.27
In 2014 Baptiste and the girl visit an abandoned WWII bunker where she says she was held. A receipt found at the bunker is traced to a local butcher, Kristian Herz. The girl formally identifies Herz as her captor after Brigadier Adrian Stone surreptitiously threatens the girl, by way of a fable, evidently implicating himself in some way. In 2016 Baptiste has a brain tumour. He flies to Kirkuk, Iraq, searching for a British Army Trooper Daniel Reed. Baptiste feels he is being followed. Assisted by a resident European reporter, he approaches the front line where the two are captured by Peshmerga soldiers.
11	3	"A Prison Without Walls"	Ben Chanan	Harry Williams & Jack Williams	26 October 2016	7.93
In 2014 Baptiste confronts the girl, speaking in French, calling her Sophie. She runs away, buys a can of petrol and hides it in the garden shed. At dinner she shocks the Webster family by telling of a roller coaster ride she enjoyed while abducted, and claims she still does not feel free. She asks Matthew to lock her in the shed, and to do a favour: to visit Herz in prison and apologise for her actions. That night the shed is ablaze. Sam is badly burned attempting to save her but only a corpse remains. In 2016 the Peshmerga soldiers lead Baptiste to Daniel Reed, AWOL, who tells him he has discovered a dark secret about his father; Henry Reed had been making regular payments to a Mirza Barzani in Erbil. Gemma, who has started to consider Baptiste's suspicion, finds a photograph of Alice with Sophie on the roller coaster.
12	4	"Statice"	Ben Chanan	Harry Williams & Jack Williams	2 November 2016	7.77
In 2014 Baptiste encounters Lenhart, the investigating German police officer, and they decide to join forces. CCTV shows the girl buying flowers. They are told she would have taken them to the cemetery. They find the statice on Reed's grave. In 2016 Baptiste in Iraq finally locates Mirza Barzani, who says that Reed had been making regular compensation payments for a certain crime that Reed and his "army friend Stone" had committed in 1991 against his then 9-year-old sister. By 2016 Stone is suffering from dementia. Gemma notices a third girl on the roller coaster with Alice and Sophie.
13	5	"Das Vergessen"	Ben Chanan	Harry Williams & Jack Williams	9 November 2016	8.03
In 2014 Baptiste and Lenhart inspect Henry Reed's house in Eckhausen where he had apparently committed suicide. Phone records lead them to a prostitute who had visited the house on the night of his death. She confirms Baptiste's suspicions that it was not suicide but murder. In 2016 Stone admits to Baptiste that "three of us" did something to a girl. German police officer Lenhart identifies the third girl on the roller coaster as Lena Garber who also went missing. He visits the army press officer Adam Gettrick at his home. A young child appears unexpectedly from upstairs and shows Lenhart a drawing, saying it is of herself and her mother in the cellar. Gettrick overpowers Lenhart and kills him with a drill.
14	6	"Saint John"	Ben Chanan	Harry Williams & Jack Williams	16 November 2016	7.42
In 2015 Sam starts an affair with Sergeant Eve Stone, Brigadier Stone's daughter. Matthew steals an army Land Rover and his father takes the blame. In 2016 Sam confesses to his wife that Eve is pregnant. Baptiste tells Gemma that Brigadier Stone was involved in Alice's disappearance; Matthew overhears and breaks into Stone's care home, beating him and leaving him seriously injured. Baptiste persuades Gemma to illicitly copy army files that show that the senior British officer in Iraq during 1991 was Kristian Herz's wife, Nadia Herz. Baptiste accosts Herz, and she admits she knows something about the crime that happened there.
15	7	"1991"	Ben Chanan	Harry Williams & Jack Williams	23 November 2016	7.79
Iraq 1991. Gettrick is abducted by a local whose daughter he molested, and Herz refuses to search for him, believing him to be AWOL. Stone and Reed rescue Gettrick and set fire to the house, killing Mirza Barzani's father and sister. In 2016 Nadia Herz briefs Baptiste on all she knows about the incident, and he suggests that Gettrick framed her husband as revenge for her failure to help him. Baptiste is arrested on suspicion of assaulting Stone. After his release, he and Gemma break into Gettrick's home and uncover a padlocked cellar door. Gettrick drives, with the small child, to a house hidden in the woods in Switzerland. In the boot of the car is Alice Webster, who is re-imprisoned at the house.
16	8	"The Mountain"	Ben Chanan	Harry Williams & Jack Williams	30 November 2016	8.04
In 2014 Sophie develops appendicitis. Gettrick blackmails Stone and Reed into helping him using his knowledge of what happened in Iraq, and then kills Reed when he tries to go to the police. He instructs Sophie to pose as Alice; releasing her to seek medical help. In 2016 Baptiste and the Websters search Gettrick's house and deduce that he has left for Vaaren in Switzerland. Baptiste and the Websters close in on Gettrick, who ends up shooting Sam. The Swiss police arrive after Eve traces Baptiste's phone. Gettrick is captured by the police and Alice is freed. When Gettrick is interrogated he admits that he had killed Lena Garber and placed her body in the burning shed. Sam does not survive. Kristian Herz is released from prison. Sophie is reunited with her father, who meets Lucy, his granddaughter, for the first time. Eve confronts her father over the events in Iraq, but his dementia seems to prevent him from understanding. Baptiste undergoes brain surgery.

== Reception ==
The first series of The Missing earned a score of 96% on Rotten Tomatoes, with an average rating of 8.4/10 out of 28 reviews. The site's critical consensus reads, "The Missing turns a common premise into a standout thriller with heartfelt, affecting performances." On Metacritic, the series has a score of 85 out of 100 based on 21 reviews, indicating "universal acclaim". The Guardian called it "hauntingly brilliant television". The Daily Telegraph described it as "supremely compelling". The Independent said it was "tense [...] absorbing [...] mercilessly believable". The New York Times wrote "The Missing is imaginatively written, well cast, chillingly believable and quite addictive. This kind of story has been told this way before, but somehow that doesn’t make this telling any less compelling."

Gerard O'Donovan, in The Telegraph referred to the final episode as "... a manipulation too far.... I mostly felt that sinking feeling you get when a book or series you've loved goes wrong in the final stretch".

In January 2015, at the 72nd Golden Globe Awards, the series was nominated for Best Miniseries or Television Film and Frances O'Connor was nominated for Best Actress – Miniseries or Television Film. For the 5th Critics' Choice Television Awards, James Nesbitt was nominated for Best Actor in a Movie/Miniseries. At the 2015 British Academy Television Awards, the series received four nominations — Best Drama Series, Radio Times Audience Award, Nesbitt for Best Actor and Ken Stott for Best Supporting Actor. For the 67th Primetime Emmy Awards, Tom Shankland received a nomination for Outstanding Directing for a Limited Series, Movie or a Dramatic Special.

On Rotten Tomatoes, the second series has earned a score of 100%, with an average rating of 8.55/10 out of 15 reviews. The site's critical consensus reads, "The Missing's astute narrative and intense perplexity allow for more thrills and exciting guesswork in season 2." On Metacritic, the series has a score of 76 out of 100 based on 14 reviews, indicating "generally favorable reviews".
