= Harry and Jack Williams =

English television writers and producers

Harry and Jack Williams are English brothers best known for their work as television screenwriters and producers. They created The Missing and its spinoff Baptiste having previously worked on series such as Hotel Babylon, Wild at Heart, and Call the Midwife. After setting up their production company Two Brothers Pictures in 2014, they developed and produced Fleabag and created Liar, Angela Black, The Tourist, and Maya.

== Early life ==
The brothers were born in England. Jack was born in London on 15 January 1979, but Harry's birthplace and date of birth is unknown. They are the sons of writer and director Nigel Williams and producer Suzan Harrison.

== Career ==
The Williams started out writing comedy, including Roman's Empire and Honest. Jack also moonlighted as a script editor, while Harry had some small acting roles. They expanded to drama series, such as Hotel Babylon, Wild at Heart, and Call the Midwife. Their animated sitcom Full English, was released in 2012, and other than Fried in 2015, the Williams would shift towards primarily writing thrillers. In 2014, the first series of The Missing, an international co-production between the BBC and Starz, was broadcast. The second series was announced in December that year and production began in February 2016. Subsequently, the character of Julien Baptiste was given his own series. With Tchéky Karyo reprising the role, the programme was broadcast from 2019 to 2021.

The Williams set up the production company Two Brothers Pictures in 2014. It has since developed and produced television projects such as Fleabag, as well as several of the Williams' own projects, such as Liar, Angela Black and Boat Story. In 2022, their thriller series The Tourist, starring Jamie Dornan as an amnesiac, aired on BBC One and STAN. In March 2022 it was renewed for a second season which aired in January 2024.

Their series The Assassin filmed in Greece in August 2024 with a cast including Keeley Hawes. Season 2 of The Assassin has been ordered in February 2026.

On June 25, 2026, Deadline reported that the Williams will produce the action-comedy, Danger Money, with Prime Video. They've landed Ray Winstone in his first Amazon project.
