= The Circle (franchise) =

British reality game show franchise

- The international logo for The Circle
- Original work: The Circle

Films and television
- Television series: The Circle (independent international versions, see below)

Audio
- Original music: "The Circle Theme"

Miscellaneous
- First aired: 18 September 2018
- Distributor: Channel 4; Netflix; Hulu

Official website
- https://www.thecirclecasting.com/

The Circle is a reality competition television franchise, first broadcast in the United Kingdom on Channel 4 in 2018, and subsequently syndicated internationally by Netflix.

Each version in the franchise features contestants who live in different apartments in a complex that is isolated from the outside world. The players are continuously monitored during their stay in the apartments by cameras as well as personal audio microphones. Throughout the course of the competition, they are eliminated, or "blocked", until only one remains and wins the cash prize.

As of November 2026, four countries (United Kingdom, United States, Brazil and France) have launched their installments to the franchise with a total of five competitions in the countries aired. All versions of the show were initially filmed in an apartment block in Salford in the United Kingdom, with the American version moving to Atlanta, Georgia for later seasons.

== Premise and format ==
The contestants, or "players", move into the same apartment building. However, the contestants do not meet face-to-face during the course of the competition, as they each live in their own individual apartment. They communicate solely using their profiles on a specially designed social media app that gives them the ability to portray themselves in any way they choose. Players can thus opt to present themselves as a completely different personality to the other players, a tactic known as catfishing; for example, one male player in the first season presented himself as a female identity, while another female contestant used photos of a woman she felt was more attractive.

Throughout the series, the contestants "rate" one another from first to last place. At the end of the ratings, their average ratings are revealed to one another from lowest to highest. Normally, the two highest-rated players become "Influencers", while the remaining players will be at risk of being "blocked" by the Influencers. However, occasionally there may be a twist to the blocking process – varying from the lowest rating players being instantly blocked, the identity of the Influencers being a secret, or multiple players being blocked at one time. Blocked players are eliminated from the game, but are given the opportunity to meet one player still in the game in-person. Then, the day after a blocking, a video message is shown to the remaining players to reveal if they were real or fake.

During the finale, the contestants rate each other one final time, where the highest rated player wins the game and the cash prize. Some versions of the show also feature a "Fan Favourite" award in which viewers vote for their favourite player to receive to a smaller cash prize.

== History ==
=== Concept ===
Tim Harcourt is the creative director of Studio Lambert, which produces the British and American versions of the show. Harcourt wondered what a reality show would look like if the people never met face-to-face. He had also been considering the idea of a bird's-eye view-style documentary of an apartment building, seeing into each of their lives. He began to work on The Circle after hearing that Channel 4 was looking for a reality-show format centered on social media.

=== International development ===
The British version of the show premiered in 2018, and was renewed for its second series a few months after the first season ended. After the first series was Channel 4's "youngest profiling" show in six years, according to the British TV industry magazine Broadcast, talks began of international versions. On 8 October 2018, Netflix announced its partnership with All3Media to create three international versions of The Circle on Netflix, including the American version. Brandon Reigg, Netflix's Vice Principal of Unscripted Content, stated, "We think the show's combination of modern social media interaction and competition will captivate Netflix members around the world, in multiple languages, and we're delighted to partner with Studio Lambert and Motion to produce these three new local versions."

The first international version, The Circle in the United States, premiered on 1 January 2020. Soon after, The Circle Brazil started airing on 11 March 2020 and ended on 25 March. Two weeks later, the entire first season of The Circle France was released on 9 April.

On 15 June 2020, Channel 4 announced that they were commissioning The Celebrity Circle, a celebrity version of The Circle as a fundraiser for the Stand Up to Cancer campaign in the UK.

== International versions ==
As of May 25, 2022, 10 winners have been crowned within 5 different versions of The Circle.

Franchise with a currently airing season (1)
Franchise with an upcoming season (1)
Franchise with an unknown status (0)
Franchise awaiting confirmation (0)
Franchise that has ceased to air (2)

Country	Title	Network	Seasons and winners	Cash prize	Presenter(s)	Narrator
Brazil	The Circle Brasil	Netflix	Season 1, 2020: Marina Gregory	R$300,000	Giovanna Ewbank	
France	The Circle Game	Netflix	Season 1, 2020: Romain Ben	€100,000	—N/a	Alfred Gerbet
United Kingdom	The Circle	Channel 4	Season 1, 2018: Alex Hobern; Season 2, 2019: Paddy Smyth; Season 3, 2021: Natalya Platonova	£100,000	Maya Jama (1); Alice Levine (1); Emma Willis (2–3)	Sophie Willan
United Kingdom	The Celebrity Circle for Stand Up to Cancer	Channel 4	Season 1, 2021: Lady Leshurr	—N/a	Emma Willis	Sophie Willan
United States	The Circle	Netflix	Season 1, 2020: Joey Sasso; Season 2, Spring 2021: DeLeesa St. Agathe; Season 3, Fall 2021: James Andre Jefferson Jr.; Season 4, 2022: Frank Grimsley; Season 5, 2022–23: Sam Carmona; Season 6, Spring 2024: Brandon Baker; Season 7, Fall 2024: Jojo and Nicky Scarlotta	$100,000 (Note: On the 4th season of the American version of The Circle, the top prize is $150,000.)	Michelle Buteau	
United States	The Circle	Hulu	Season 8, 2026: Current season	$100,000	Tinx	

== In popular culture ==
An episode of the Dropout comedy game show Game Changer, titled "Ratfish", was inspired by The Circle. During the episodes, the players (comedians familiar with one another) entered “The Circle” as comedic characters. As they interacted in the group chat and mini-games, each player was ultimately tasked with discovering one another's identities to avoid being eliminated.
