= The Circle (French TV series) =

French reality television show

- The official title screen for the show
- Also known as: The Circle France
- French: The Circle Game
- Genre: Reality competition
- Narrated by: Alfred Gerbet
- Country of origin: France
- Original language: French
- No. of series: 1
- No. of episodes: 12

Production
- Running time: 37–51 minutes
- Production company: Studio Lambert

Original release
- Network: Netflix
- Release: 9 April 2020

Related
- The Circle franchise

The Circle France (also known as The Circle Game in France) is a French reality competition show, produced by Studio Lambert and Motion Content Group which first aired on Netflix on 9 April 2020 that is based on a British TV series of the same name. Along with The Circle France, Netflix also released separate versions of The Circle in the United States and Brazil. The show bills itself as a game based around social media, with the concept that "anyone can be anyone in The Circle". It has been compared to Big Brother and Catfish in format, as well as Black Mirror episode "Nosedive" with the concept of ratings.

On 9 April 2020, the season was won by Romain Ben, who had played the game as himself, and won the €100,000 (US$110,000) prize that came along with it. Éléa Zazu was the runner-up.

== Format ==
The contestants, or "players", move into the same apartment building. However, the contestants do not meet face-to-face during the course of the competition, as they each live in their own individual apartment. They communicate solely using their profiles on a specially designed social media app that gives them the ability to portray themselves in any way they choose. Players can thus opt to present themselves as a completely different personality to the other players, a tactic otherwise known as catfishing; for example, one male player in the first season presented himself as a female identity, while another female contestant used photos of a woman she felt was more attractive.

Throughout the series, the contestants "rate" one another from first to last place. At the end of the ratings, their average ratings are revealed to one another from lowest to highest. Normally, the two highest-rated players become "influencers", while the remaining players will be at risk of being "blocked" by the influencers. However, occasionally there may be a twist to the blocking process – varying from the lowest rating players being instantly blocked, the identity of the influencers being a secret, or multiple players being blocked at one time. Blocked players are eliminated from the game, but are given the opportunity to meet one player still in the game in-person. Then, the day after a blocking, a video message is shown to the remaining players to reveal if they were real or fake.

During the finale, the contestants rate each other one final time, where the highest rated player wins the game and €100,000 (US$110,000).

== Players ==
The players were selected from the "20–25 individuals" being cleared to appear on the show, with the remaining people never leaving standby status and not appearing on the show. The first nine players were revealed on The Circle France's Instagram profile. The players' profiles were revealed as they introduced themselves on-screen during an episode.

Name	Age	Residence	Playing as	Entered	Exit	Status
Lou Baudry	22	Marseille	Herself	Episode 1	Episode 2	Blocked
Jo Guérin	78	Verneuil-sur-Seine	Friends playing jointly as 25-year-old "Nicolas"	Episode 1	Episode 4	Blocked
Monique Genty	75	Verneuil-sur-Seine	Friends playing jointly as 25-year-old "Nicolas"	Episode 1	Episode 4	Blocked
Cédric Doumbé	27	Bordeaux	Himself	Episode 1	Episode 6	Blocked
Gary Jarny	30	Les Sables-d'Olonne	Himself	Episode 1	Episode 8	Blocked
Ines Camilia Tazi	23	London	Herself, but single	Episode 1	Episode 9	Blocked
Paolo Rodriguez	21	Chatou	Himself	Episode 6	Episode 10	Blocked
Virginie Constance Catala	28	Avignon	Herself, but a single 30-year-old gynecologist	Episode 8	Episode 11	Blocked
Maxime Merkouchenko	24	Monaco	"Valeria", his 25-year-old wife, but single and from Nice	Episode 1	Episode 12	Fifth place
Edmundo Faisca	24	London	Twin brothers playing as "Nelia", a 25-year-old fashion blogger from Toulouse	Episode 4	Episode 12	Fourth place
João Faisca	24	London	Twin brothers playing as "Nelia", a 25-year-old fashion blogger from Toulouse	Episode 4	Episode 12	Fourth place
Rudy Doukhan	37	Marseille	"Gabriel", a single 32-year-old father	Episode 3	Episode 12	Third place
Éléa Zazu	27	Nice	Herself	Episode 1	Episode 12	Runner-up
Romain Ben	28	Paris	Himself	Episode 1	Episode 12	Winner

=== Future Appearances ===
==== Perfect Match ====
Ines Tazi appeared on Season One of Perfect Match. She was eliminated in Episode Nine.

== Episodes ==
No.	Title	Original release date
1	"Hello Circle"	9 April 2020
The first eight players entered The Circle and created their profiles, including their name, age, hometown, and a short bio. Immediately after, the players were shown everyone else's profiles. For the rest of the day, players were given time to chat with each other and talk on The Circle Chat. Then the ratings opened, and the players had to rate the other profiles from first to seventh. The two players that received the highest average rating would become an Influencer.
2	"Blocked"	9 April 2020
Éléa and Cédric, placing first and second respectively, became the first Influencers.: Game ("D'accord, pas d'accord?", lit. "Agree or Disagree?"): Players were given statements and had to say whether they agree or disagree with the statements. After all the players had answered, the results were revealed and the players were allowed to discuss their answers.; That night, Éléa and Cédric went to the Hangout to discuss their decision. Meanwhile, those in danger entered the At Risk Chat to talk. Éléa and Cédric decided to block Lou. After being blocked, Lou visited Cédric to talk face-to-face. The next morning, The Circle posted a goodbye message from Lou.
3	"#cgolri"	9 April 2020
A new player, Rudy entered The Circle, playing as Gabriel.: Game ("Cinémojis", lit. "Cinema Emojis"): Players were given a string of emojis to represent a movie title. Players had to guess the movie title, and then answer a question pertaining to that movie. The highest scoring players earned a private party with Rudy. Gary, Ines, and Maxime were the highest scoring players.; The next day, the ratings opened. Rudy, being the newest player in The Circle, could rate but could not be rated. Ines and Maxime became Influencers, placing first and second respectively.
4	"The Rocking Grandmother"	9 April 2020
Ines and Maxime decided to block Jo & Monique. Jo & Monique decided to visit Romain, revealing that they were a catfish. The next morning, The Circle posted a goodbye video from Jo & Monique, revealing to all players that Nicolas was a lie. Soon after, the players were allowed to post a new photo to their profile. Edmundo & João enter The Circle, playing as Nelia. Edmundo & João could pick one player to invite on a private date.
5	"#TeamWinner"	9 April 2020
Edmundo & João chose to go on a date with Romain.: Game ("Tague le Joueur", lit. "Tag the Player"): Players were shown a series of memes. The players would then tag the player that they thought best fit the meme.; That night, ratings opened. As the newest players, Edmundo & João could rate but could not be rated. This time, Rudy could be rated.
6	"Knocked Out"	9 April 2020
It was announced that there would be no Influencers. The two lowest rated players would be at risk. The other six players would decide who would be blocked. The two lowest rated players, Éléa and Cédric, went to the Hangout where they saw each other face-to-face. Cédric received three of the five available votes, meaning he was blocked. Soon after, Paolo entered The Circle. The players had to write a handwritten card to send the Paolo. After, they were uploaded to the newsfeed for everyone to see.
7	"Alliances"	9 April 2020
Paolo was able to send one gift, either a teddy bear, a box of chocolates, or a bouquet, to whoever's message made this biggest impact on him. He decided to send the box of chocolates to Romain.: Game ("Soirée Pyjama", lit. "Pajama Party"): The players were given their own pair of matching pajamas. Through the night, the players were allowed to have a pajama party with each other, engaging in chats and dancing to music. The next morning, the ratings opened. With Paolo being the newest player, he could rate the others but he was not allowed to be rated. Then the ratings were revealed. Éléa and Ines, placing first and second respectively, became the Influencers.
8	"The Last 8"	9 April 2020
Éléa and Ines decided to block Gary. Gary decided to visit Ines, meeting face-to-face. The next morning, Gary's goodbye message was posted on the newsfeed. That same day, the last player, Virginie, entered The Circle.: Game ("Le Plus Beau Portrait Gâteau", lit. "The Best Looking Will Get What's Cooking"): The players had to bake a cake that bore the effigy of Virginie. Virginie would pick the best looking cake. She decided Éléa's cake was the best.
9	"The Super Influencer"	9 April 2020
The players were informed that Virginie was the last player to join The Circle. They were also told that the next rating would not have two Influencers, but just one "Superinfluencer" who would have the power to block any player of their choosing. The ratings opened, and since Virginie was the newest player, she could rate but could not be rated. Romain became the Superinfluencer, and he decided to block Ines. The next morning, the newsfeed was updated with Ines' goodbye message.: Game ("La Vérité, Rien Que La Vérité?", lit. "The Truth, Nothing but the Truth?"): One at a time, the players was asked a question pertaining to one of the players. After all of the players answered the question, the results were revealed.
10	"The Betrayal"	9 April 2020
The ratings opened with another rule change. The least popular player would be instantly blocked. Paolo was the lowest rated player, and he was blocked. Paolo went to visit Edmundo & João. The next morning, the newsfeed was updated with Paolo's goodbye video. Soon after, the players were allowed to post a new photo to their profile.: Game ("Circle Challenges"): The players were given a series of challenges. The winner of each challenge could eliminate two players until there were two left. The winner of the last challenge won a video from their family. They could also choose one other player to receive a video from home. Éléa won, and she also gave a video from home to Maxime.
11	"No Filter"	9 April 2020
The ratings opened. These ratings determined who advanced to the finale. The next morning, the ratings were revealed. Romain and Élea, placing first and second respectively, and became the last Influencers of the season.: Game ("Le Quart D'heure No Fliter", lit. "The No Filter Quarter Hour"): Players could anonymously ask one player a question, which they can answer however they choose to. After the player answers, the chat opens to everyone to give their thoughts on the question.; Romain and Élea decided to block Virginie.
12	"The Finale"	9 April 2020
The players entered their ratings for the final time. Then, the players, as part of finale night, all went to one room to meet each other face-to-face for the first time during the whole game. Romain entered first, followed by Maxime, Éléa, and Rudy. Edmundo & João entered the room last. Then, one at a time, they entered the living room, where all of the blocked players were waiting. Before the ratings were revealed, the final five players were informed that all of the final eight players had taken part in the final ratings, including Virginie, Paolo, and Ines. Romain, earning first place, became the winner of The Circle France.

== Background ==
=== Concept ===
Tim Harcourt is the creative director of Studio Lambert, which produces the British and American versions of the show. Harcourt wondered what a reality show would look like if the people never met face-to-face. He had also been considering the idea of a bird's-eye view-style documentary of an apartment building, seeing into each of their lives. He began to work on The Circle after hearing that Channel 4 was looking for a reality-show format centered on social media.

=== Development ===
The British version of the show premiered in 2018, and was renewed for its second season a few months after the first season ended. After the first season was Channel 4's "youngest profiling" show in six years, according to the British TV industry magazine Broadcast, talks began of international versions. On October 8, 2018, Netflix announced its partnership with All3Media to create three international versions of The Circle on Netflix, including the American version. Brandon Reigg, Netflix's Vice Principal of Unscripted Content, stated, "We think the show's combination of modern social media interaction and competition will captivate Netflix members around the world, in multiple languages, and we're delighted to partner with Studio Lambert and Motion to produce these three new local versions."

== Production ==
=== Casting ===
In an interview with Variety, Tim Harcourt, one of the executive producers for Studio Lambert, stated that The Circle format and premise allowed the casting team to search for all different kinds of people. He noted how the casting contrasted from casts on show like Real Housewives or Jersey Shore and how those shows are "all one gang of quite similar characters." He explained how there was no set cast for the show until it was over. The first eight players to enter were all predetermined and planned, but everything after that was all luck to whoever got on. Harcourt stated that the production team would decide who would be the right fit depending on who just left the game, acknowledging that with thirteen contestants, not all who were possible players end up on the show at all.

Jennifer Teixido was the casting director for The Circle France.

=== The Circle app ===
Each apartment that the players live in is plastered with screens in every room in order for the players be able to hold conversations with other players as they go about their everyday lives. Each player starts out the game by creating a profile. This includes sharing their age, relationship status, a short bio, and one photo to use as their profile picture. Every day, the players are allowed to share a status update, explaining their thoughts for the day. Sometimes, either through rewards or passing a certain milestone, the players are allowed to upload another photo to their profile. However, the main purpose of The Circle ("du Cercle" in French) is to be the only way players can communicate with each other.

At several points during the game, usually every episode, The Circle has the players play a minigame so that they can get to know their fellow players better. Tim Harcourt of Studio Lambert says that "some games were really good for bonding them, some were really good for them learning about each other, some were good for testing who's a catfish, some could have been more divisive."

At certain points during the show, there would be a rating. Players would have to rate each other from first to last by using The Circle and announcing the players they want in each placement. Then, the ratings would be averaged and create an average placement for each player. Depending on how high or low their average placement was, the player's ranking would determine if they became in influencer or not. An influencer is usually the two people who get first and second place at the ratings. The influencers would head to the hangout and discuss over The Circle which person to block.

=== Filming ===
The Circle France was filmed in December 2019, in the same Salford, England apartment building that was also used by American version's first season, the British version's second season, and the Brazilian version's first season. The season was the last of that batch of four seasons filmed.

=== Release ===
On 26 March 2020, the trailer for the French version was released, revealing the premiere date to be 9 April 2020, and the prize amount to be €100,000 (US$110,000). All twelve episodes were released on 9 April; this is different from all other versions which released several episodes weekly.

== Results and elimination ==
Color Key
The contestant was blocked.
The contestant was an influencer.
The contestant was immune from being blocked.

	Episode 2	Episode 4	Episode 6	Episode 8	Episode 9	Episode 10	Episode 11	Episode 12 Finale	
Romain	3rd	5th	4th	=4th	1st	2nd	1st	1st	Winner (Episode 12)
Éléa	1st	7th	6th	1st	Not published	4th	2nd	2nd	Second place (Episode 12)
Rudy "Gabriel"	Not in The Circle	Exempt	2nd	3rd	Not published	5th	5th	3rd	Third place (Episode 12)
Edmundo & João "Nelia"	Not in The Circle		Exempt	7th	Not published	6th	6th	4th	Fourth place (Episode 12)
Maxime "Valeria"	7th	1st	1st	6th	Not published	3rd	4th	5th	Fifth place (Episode 12)
Virginie	Not in The Circle				Exempt	1st	3rd	Blocked (Episode 11)	
Paolo	Not in The Circle			Exempt	Not published	7th	Blocked (Episode 10)		
Ines	=4th	2nd	3rd	2nd	Not published	Blocked (Episode 9)			
Gary	=4th	3rd	5th	=4th	Blocked (Episode 8)				
Cédric	2nd	4th	7th	Blocked (Episode 6)					
Jo & Monique "Nicolas"	8th	6th	Blocked (Episode 4)						
Lou	6th	Blocked (Episode 2)							
Notes	none		1	none	2	3	none	4	
Influencers	Cédric; Éléa	Ines; Maxime	none	Éléa; Ines	Romain	none	Éléa; Romain	none	
Blocked	Lou; Influencers' choice to block	Jo & Monique "Nicolas"; Influencers' choice to block	Cédric; 3 of 5 votes to block	Gary; Influencers' choice to block	Ines; Superinfluencer's choice to block	Paolo; Lowest rated player	Virginie; Influencers' choice to block	Maxime "Valeria"; Lowest rated player	Edmundo & João "Nelia"; Fourth highest rated player
Blocked	Lou; Influencers' choice to block	Jo & Monique "Nicolas"; Influencers' choice to block	Cédric; 3 of 5 votes to block	Gary; Influencers' choice to block	Ines; Superinfluencer's choice to block	Paolo; Lowest rated player	Virginie; Influencers' choice to block	Rudy "Gabriel"; Third highest rated player	Éléa; Second highest rated player
Blocked	Lou; Influencers' choice to block	Jo & Monique "Nicolas"; Influencers' choice to block	Cédric; 3 of 5 votes to block	Gary; Influencers' choice to block	Ines; Superinfluencer's choice to block	Paolo; Lowest rated player	Virginie; Influencers' choice to block	Romain; Highest rated player	

=== Notes ===
- ^Note 1: In Episode 6, there were no Influencers. Instead, the two lowest-rated players were at risk and were the only ones that could be blocked. The five other players (excluding Edmundo & João, as a new player) voted publicly in the Circle Chat to block one of the bottom two. Romain, Maxime and Rudy chose to block Cédric, and Ines and Gary chose to block Éléa. Since Cédric received more votes, he was blocked.
- ^Note 2: In Episode 9, the ratings were not published. Instead, the highest-rated player automatically became a secret "Superinfluencer", who had the sole decision on whom to block.
- ^Note 3: In Episode 10, there were no Influencers. Instead, the least popular player was instantly blocked.
- ^Note 4: In Episode 12, the Final Set of Ratings determined the winner of The Circle Game. In a twist, the last three blocked players (Ines, Virginie, Paolo) also contributed for the Final Ratings, as they were a part of the Final 8 players - they rated all remaining players before their post-block room visit.

== Reception ==
Joe Keller from Decider, in a regular series called "Stream It or Skip It", told his audience to stream it. His reasons include that the format is still solid and the gist of the show is still fresh, despite four previous international seasons. However, he does comment that the cast is lacking in diversity, especially since this season aired after the "sexually-fluid" cast of the Brazilian version.
