= The Circle (Brazilian TV series) =

Brazilian reality television show

- Promotional poster for the series
- Also known as: The Circle Brazil
- Portuguese: The Circle Brasil
- Genre: Reality competition
- Presented by: Giovanna Ewbank
- Country of origin: Brazil
- Original language: Portuguese
- No. of seasons: 1
- No. of episodes: 12

Production
- Running time: 39–61 minutes
- Production company: Studio Lambert

Original release
- Network: Netflix
- Release: 11 March – 25 March 2020

Related
- The Circle franchise

The Circle Brazil (also known as The Circle Brasil in Brazil) is a Brazilian reality competition show, produced by Studio Lambert and Motion Content Group which will be launched on Netflix. It premiered on 11 March 2020 and ended on 25 March as part of a three-week event. Along with The Circle Brazil, Netflix also released separate versions of The Circle in the United States and France. The Circle Brazil will be the first Brazilian reality TV show on Netflix. The show bills itself as a game based around social media, with the concept that "anyone can be anyone in The Circle". It has been compared to Big Brother and Catfish in format.

Marina Gregory won the first season of The Circle Brazil and the R$300,000 prize that came along with it. Rayssa "Ray" Santos was the runner-up.

== Format ==
The contestants, or "players", move into the same apartment building. However, the contestants do not meet face-to-face during the course of the competition, as they each live in their own individual apartment. They communicate solely using their profiles on a specially designed social media app that gives them the ability to portray themselves in any way they choose. Players can thus opt to present themselves as a completely different personality to the other players, a tactic otherwise known as catfishing; for example, one male player in the first season presented himself as a female identity, while another female contestant used photos of a woman she felt was more attractive.

In each episode, the contestants "rate" one another from first to last place. At the end of the ratings, their average ratings are revealed to one another from lowest to highest. Normally, the two highest-rated players become "Influencers", while the remaining players will be at risk of being "blocked" by the Influencers. However, occasionally there may be a twist to the blocking process – varying from the lowest rating players being instantly blocked, the identity of the influencers being a secret, or multiple players being blocked at one time. Blocked players are eliminated from the game, but are given the opportunity to meet one player still in the game in-person. Then, the day after a blocking, a video message is shown to the remaining players to reveal if they were real or fake.

During the season finale, the contestants rate each other one final time, where the highest rated player wins the game and R$300,000 (US$67,000).

== Players ==
A total of 14 players were selected from the "20–25 individuals" being cleared to appear on the show, with the remaining people never leaving standby status and not appearing on the show. The players' profiles were revealed as they introduced themselves on-screen during an episode.

Name	Age	Hometown	Playing as	Entered	Exit	Status
Ana Carla Medeiros	22	Campina Grande, Paraíba	Herself	Episode 1	Episode 2	Blocked
Rob Vulcan	34	Sorocaba, São Paulo	"Julia", a single and bisexual 34-year-old	Episode 1	Episode 3	Blocked
Gabriel "Gaybol" Cardoso	26	São Paulo, São Paulo	Himself	Episode 1	Episode 5	Blocked
Paloma "Loma" Lisboa	26	São Paulo, São Paulo	"Lucas", a sexy straight 25-year-old male	Episode 1	Episode 6	Blocked
João Akel	20	Araxá, Minas Gerais	Himself, but a 30-year-old dietician	Episode 1	Episode 9	Blocked
Lorayne Oliver	22	Realeza, Paraná	Herself	Episode 1	Episode 10	Blocked
Renan Marconi	30	Maringá, Paraná	Himself, but a single 26-year-old	Episode 9	Episode 10	Blocked
Raf Vilar	37	Rio de Janeiro, Rio de Janeiro	"Ana", a bisexual 35-year-old writer	Episode 7	Episode 11	Blocked
Lucas Blazute	30	Rio Branco, Acre	Twin brothers playing jointly as 27-year-old female "Luma"	Episode 2	Episode 12	Fifth place
Marcel Blazute	30	Rio Branco, Acre	Twin brothers playing jointly as 27-year-old female "Luma"	Episode 2	Episode 12	Fifth place
Raphael Dumaresq	24	Natal, Rio Grande do Norte	Himself	Episode 1	Episode 12	Fourth place
João Paulo "JP" Gadelha	31	Recife, Pernambuco	Himself, but 28-years-old	Episode 1	Episode 12	Third place
Rayssa "Ray" Santos	22	Manaus, Amazonas	Herself, but a single 25-year-old	Episode 4	Episode 12	Runner-up
Marina Gregory	25	Rio de Janeiro, Rio de Janeiro	Herself, but a 22-year-old singer	Episode 1	Episode 12	Winner

=== Future appearances ===
After this season, in 2020, JP Gadelha appeared in A Fazenda 12, he finished in 19th place

In 2021, Marina Gregory appeared as original cast member on De Férias com o Ex Brasil: Celebs 2, while in 2022 Gregory appeared on De Férias com o Ex Brasil: Salseiro VIP as an original cast member and compete on All Star Shore winning the game.

== Episodes ==
No.	Title	Original release date
Week 1
1	"Welcome to The Circle"	11 March 2020
The first nine players entered The Circle and were tasked with creating their profiles, including their age, relationship status, a short bio, and a profile picture. Immediately after, the players had to rank the other players from first to eighth bases on their first impressions of their profiles. The two players who ranked first and second would become The Circle Influencers, making the decision on whom they should block from The Circle. When the ratings were revealed, Dumaresq and Marina received first and second place, respectively. They went up to the Blue Room where they made the decision on who to block.
2	"House Party"	11 March 2020
Dumaresq and Marina decided to block Ana Carla. As part of the format of the game, Ana Carla made her way to meet one of her fellow players face-to-face. She visited Dumaresq where she confronted him on calling her a catfish.: Game: The next day, the players played an informal game where The Circle showed all the players an astrology chart and had the players guess what zodiac sign each of the other players were.; That night, there was a "festa" or party. The players all got a package at their door full of clothes they would wear to a carnival. Also in the box was ingredients and a recipe on how to make a caipirinha. Then, music was played throughout the apartments and the players started to dance. However, during the party, two twin brothers joined The Circle, playing as one player.
3	"Follow the Dance"	11 March 2020
The twins, who were revealed to be Lucas & Marcel, played jointly as a woman named Luma. They created their profile for The Circle, and joined the party. Before viewing Lucas & Marcel's profile, the players were allowed to post their best carnival photo as a new photo on the profile. While they were posting their photos, Lucas & Marcel were able to view all the other profiles. After every player posted their carnival photo, Lucas & Marcel posted their own photo, officially revealing Lucas & Marcel to the players. When Lucas & Marcel's photo is shown to the players, Rob immediately comments that they are accepting of transgender people despite that neither the photos Lucas & Marcel are using, nor the description on Lucas & Marcel's profile, suggests that she would be transgender. The next day, Rob asks Lucas & Marcel if their birth certificate has male or female on it, again hinting that she is transgender. This confuses many players since they did not think she was transgender. Lucas & Marcel say she is a woman and that female is written on her birth certificate.: Game ("Segue o Baile", lit. "Follow the Dance"): Lucas & Marcel had to perform different dance moves and the players, one at a time, had to guess which dance they were doing. The players who guessed the right dance move got coconut water and a certificate stating that they have excellent skills in recognizing dance styles.; After the game, rating started. As new players, Lucas & Marcel could rate, but couldn't be rated. Lorayne and Marina were rated first and second respectively, making them Influencers. They decided to block Rob.
4	"Opinion Poll"	11 March 2020
Rob went to Marina's apartment. The next morning, the newsfeed was updated with a video from Rob, revealing to all the players that he was a catfish.: Game ("Pesquisa de Opinião", lit. "Opinion Poll"): The Circle gave the players five categories (sexiest, two-faced, biggest player, trustworthy, and most likely to be a catfish); the players had to choose which player fit the category the most. After everyone answered the questions, the poll results were announced.; After the game, Ray entered The Circle.
Week 2
5	"Poisoned Apple"	18 March 2020
The news that a new player arrived was given to the players. Ray was told she would be able to see the results of the Opinion Poll from last episode. From the results, she could choose one person to go on a date with in the Blue Room. She decided to go on a date with Lorayne.: Game ("Jogo da Verdade", lit. "Game of Truth"): One at a time, players would ask another player a question. The player who received the question could either answer the question truthfully or complete a dare produced by The Circle.; After the game finished, the ratings opened. As the new player, Ray could rate the other players but could not be rated. When the rating results were revealed, it was announced that the lowest rated player would immediately get blocked from The Circle. The lowest rated player was Gaybol. Gaybol went to visit JP's apartment.
6	"Blue Room"	18 March 2020
It was revealed that another player would be blocked that night. JP and Lorayne, after receiving first and second place respectively, became Influencers and headed to the Blue Room. JP and Lorayne decided to block Lucas. Loma headed to Marina's apartment, where she revealed herself to be catfishing as Lucas. The next morning, the newsfeed was updating with video messages from Gaybol and Loma, revealing that Loma was a catfish.
7	"The Circle Cup"	18 March 2020
Raf joined The Circle, playing as his best friend, Ana. After he created Ana's profile, his profile became public, and the players were able to see Ana's profile. Then, The Circle Chat opened, allowing Raf to make his first impression as Ana.: Game ("Mentes Brilhantes", lit. "Brilliant Minds"): Split into two teams, the Pink Team and the Blue Team, will each select a player for a given category. The player will have to answer a question that pertains to the category. The team to have the most correct answers won a pizza party; the losing team will be revoked of their access to The Circle for the night. After they tied, it went to a tiebreaker question. The Blue Team answered the last question correctly, granting Ray, Lorayne, JP, Lucas, and Marcel a pizza party.
8	"Painting Truths"	18 March 2020
The ratings opened, and, as the new player, Ana could not be rated but she could rate the other players.: Game: Each player received a canvas and painting supplies. They were told to use the painting supplies to create a painting for a specific player given by The Circle. The players could paint whatever they wanted, as long as it was directed to that player.; The results were revealed. Lucas & Marcel and Dumaresq came in first and second respectively, making them the Influencers. They made their way to the Blue Room to make their decision on who to block. However, the Influencers were given the power to save one person of their choosing before deliberating on who to block. Lucas & Marcel saved Ray and Dumaresq saved Marina.
Week 3
9	"Pool Party"	25 March 2020
After it came down to the three vulnerable players, Lorayne, Akel, and JP, Akel was blocked from The Circle. He was allowed to visit another player's apartment, and he chose to visit Lorayne. The next morning, a new player, Renan, entered The Circle. He was allowed to send breakfast to another female player. He chose Lorayne. After the breakfast, the newsfeed was updated with Akel's video, in which he was revealed to be real, but admitted to lying about his age and profession. That night, there was a "festa" or party because Renan was the last player to enter The Circle; however, immediately after the party, the ratings opened. Renan, being the newest player, was allowed to rate the other players, but he couldn't get rated. When the ratings were supposed to be announced, The Circle revealed that the highest rated player became the Superinfluencer, so there was no need to reveal the ratings. Lucas & Marcel got an alert saying that they had become the Superinfluencer, and they would have to tell the player they chose to block about their decision in person. They made their way to the apartment.
10	"Fatal Visit"	25 March 2020
Lucas & Marcel decided to block Lorayne. Since Lucas & Marcel had to visit her apartment, Lorayne was not able to meet another player face-to-face. The next morning, the newsfeed was updated with a message from Lorayne. After the message, Lucas & Marcel decided to tell everyone that they were the Superinfluencer.: Game ("Meu Maior Rival", lit. "My Biggest Rival"): One at a time, players had to announce their biggest rival to all of the other players and explain why they should beat their rival at the finale. The rival would then get a chance to send a response.; That night, the ratings opened. Everyone was able to be rated. Soon after, the ratings were revealed, and Dumaresq and JP became Influencers, placing first and second respectively. However, the Influencers were not allowed to deliberate. Instead, each Influencer took turns saving one player until only one player remained. The player that was not saved would be blocked. Dumaresq went first, since he was rated higher than JP, and saved Raf. JP then saved Lucas & Marcel, and Dumaresq saved Marina. It came down to either Ray or Renan. JP saved Ray, meaning Renan was immediately blocked.
11	"Candid Questions"	25 March 2020
Renan, after getting blocked, went to visit Raf at his apartment. There, he was revealed to be a catfish.: Game ("A Última Bomba", lit. "The Last Bomb"): One at a time, players anonymously asked question to a player of their choosing, and they must answer the question truthfully.; Immediately after the game, the ratings opened. Soon after the ratings were revealed, and JP and Dumaresq became Influencers, placing first and second respectively. They made their way to the Blue Room and deliberated on who to block. They chose to block Raf. After he was blocked, Raf decided to visit Dumaresq's apartment, revealing he was a catfish. After Raf left, the players were informed that they were the finalists of The Circle Brazil. To celebrate, they had a party. Then, each player received a video from their families.
12	"The Final Meeting"	25 March 2020
The next day, the newsfeed was updated with a goodbye message from Raf, revealing to everyone that he was a catfish and encouraging players to rate strategically. The ratings opened. The players had to rate each other from first to fourth as the final rating of The Circle Brazil. The players, as part of finale night, all went to one room to meet each other face-to-face for the first time during the whole game. JP entered the room. Then, Lucas & Marcel entered the room, revealing they were a catfish to JP. Soon after, all the other players entered and found out Lucas & Marcel were a catfish. On finale night, Giovanna Ewbank talked with the blocked players and interviewed the finalists before revealing the final ratings. Marina placed first and became the winner of The Circle Brazil. Ray got second place, JP got third place, Dumaresq got fourth place, and Lucas & Marcel got fifth place.

== Background ==
=== Concept ===
Tim Harcourt is the creative director of Studio Lambert, which produces the British and American versions of the show. Harcourt wondered what a reality show would look like if the people never met face-to-face. He had also been considering the idea of a bird's-eye view-style documentary of an apartment building, seeing into each of their lives. He began to work on The Circle after hearing that Channel 4 was looking for a reality-show format centered on social media.

=== Development ===
The British version of the show premiered in 2018, and was renewed for its second season a few months after the first season ended. After the first season was Channel 4's "youngest profiling" show in six years, according to the British TV industry magazine Broadcast, talks began of international versions. On October 8, 2018, Netflix announced its partnership with All3Media to create three international versions of The Circle on Netflix, including the American version. Brandon Reigg, Netflix's Vice Principal of Unscripted Content, stated, "We think the show's combination of modern social media interaction and competition will captivate Netflix members around the world, in multiple languages, and we're delighted to partner with Studio Lambert and Motion to produce these three new local versions."

== Production ==
=== Casting ===
In an interview with Variety, Tim Harcourt, one of the executive producers for Studio Lambert, stated that The Circle format and premise allowed the casting team to search for all different kinds of people. He noted how the casting contrasted from casts on show like Real Housewives or Jersey Shore and how those shows are "all one gang of quite similar characters." He explained how there was no set cast for the show until it was over. The first eight players to enter were all predetermined and planned, but everything after that was all luck to whoever got on. Harcourt stated that the production team would decide who would be the right fit depending on who just left the game, acknowledging that with thirteen contestants, not all who were possible players end up on the show at all.

=== The Circle app ===
Each apartment that the players live in is plastered with screens in every room in order for the players be able to hold conversations with other players as they go about their everyday lives. Each player starts out the game by creating a profile. This includes sharing their age, relationship status, a short bio, and one photo to use as their profile picture. Every day, the players are allowed to share a status update, explaining their thoughts for the day. Sometimes, either through rewards or passing a certain milestone, the players are allowed to upload another photo to their profile. However, the main purpose of The Circle is to be the only way players can communicate with each other.

At several points during the game, usually every episode, The Circle has the players play a minigame so that they can get to know their fellow players better. Tim Harcourt of Studio Lambert says that "some games were really good for bonding them, some were really good for them learning about each other, some were good for testing who's a catfish, some could have been more divisive."

At certain points during the show, there would be a rating. Players would have to rate each other from first to last by using The Circle and announcing the players they want in each placement. Then, The Circle would average all the placements for each players and create an average for each player. Depending on how high or low their average placement was, the player's ranking would determine if they became in influencer or not. An influencer is usually the two people who get first and second place at the ratings. The influencers would head to the hangout and discuss over The Circle which person to block.

=== Filming ===
The Circle Brazil was filmed in Fall 2019, after the American version's first season and the British version's second season. Filming took place in the same Salford, England apartment building that was used for the American version and second season of the British version.

=== Apartment building ===
As was the same for all versions of The Circle, the first season of The Circle Brazil was shot entirely in an apartment building in Salford, England. The apartment building is always prepared with twelve furnished and ready-to-use apartments for the players to live in. The building also has an exercise room and a rooftop lounge, which are also outfitted with cameras and television screens. One room in the building, called "the testimonial room," is the room players go to after they are blocked to create their goodbye video to the remaining players. On the outside of the building is a large, lit up circle made of a roughly 82-foot (25-meter) diameter aluminum track with LED lights strung through and around the circle.

Opposite the apartment building was the control room, which was previously a college campus that became disused. At any time in the control room, there were between twenty and thirty producers and camera operators working, recording, and sending all the messages from The Circle.

=== Release ===
On 27 January 2020, a teaser for the Brazilian version was released, revealing the premiere date to be 11 March 2020. Then, on 27 February, Netflix released the trailer for the first season, revealing the prize amount to be R$300,000 (US$67,000).

== Results and elimination ==
Color Key
The contestant was blocked.
The contestant was an influencer.
The contestant was immune from being blocked.

	Episode 1	Episode 3	Episode 5	Episode 8	Episode 9	Episode 10	Episode 11	Episode 12 Final	
Marina	2nd	2nd	4th	4th	Not published	5th	6th	1st	Winner (Episode 12)
Ray	Not in The Circle		Exempt	3rd	Not published	7th	3rd	2nd	Runner-up (Episode 12)
JP	8th	=5th	1st	5th	Not published	2nd	1st	3rd	Third place (Episode 12)
Dumaresq	1st	3rd	5th	2nd	Not published	1st	2nd	4th	Fourth place (Episode 12)
Lucas & Marcel "Luma"	Not in The Circle	Exempt	3rd	1st	Not published	3rd	4th	5th	Fifth place (Episode 12)
Raf "Ana"	Not in The Circle			Exempt	Not published	4th	5th	Blocked (Episode 11)	
Renan	Not in The Circle				Exempt	6th	Blocked (Episode 10)		
Lorayne	3rd	1st	2nd	7th	Not published	Blocked (Episode 10)			
Akel	4th	4th	6th	6th	Blocked (Episode 9)				
Loma "Lucas"	6th	7th	7th	Blocked (Episode 6)					
Gaybol	7th	8th	8th	Blocked (Episode 5)					
Rob "Julia"	5th	=5th	Blocked (Episode 3)						
Ana Carla	9th	Blocked (Episode 2)							
Notes	none		1	2	3	4	none	5	
Influencers	Dumaresq, Marina	Lorayne, Marina	JP, Lorayne	Lucas & Marcel, Dumaresq	Lucas & Marcel	Dumaresq, JP	JP, Dumaresq	none	
Blocked	Ana Carla; Influencers' choice to block	Rob "Julia"; Influencers' choice to block	Gaybol; Lowest rated player	Akel; Influencers' choice to block	Lorayne; Superinfluencer's choice to block	Renan; Influencers' choice to not save	Raf "Ana"; Influencers' choice to block	Lucas & Marcel "Luma"; Lowest rated player	Dumaresq; Fourth highest rated player
Blocked	Ana Carla; Influencers' choice to block	Rob "Julia"; Influencers' choice to block	Loma "Lucas"; Influencers' choice to block	Akel; Influencers' choice to block	Lorayne; Superinfluencer's choice to block	Renan; Influencers' choice to not save	Raf "Ana"; Influencers' choice to block	JP; Third highest rated player	Ray; Second highest rated player
Blocked	Ana Carla; Influencers' choice to block	Rob "Julia"; Influencers' choice to block	Loma "Lucas"; Influencers' choice to block	Akel; Influencers' choice to block	Lorayne; Superinfluencer's choice to block	Renan; Influencers' choice to not save	Raf "Ana"; Influencers' choice to block	Marina; Highest rated player	

=== Notes ===
- ^Note 1: In Episode 5, the lowest-rated player, Gaybol, was immediately blocked from The Circle. Then the new influencers headed to the Hangout and blocked another player.
- ^Note 2: In Episode 8, each influencer was able to save one player of their choosing. "Luma"/Lucas & Marcel saved Ray, and Dumaresq saved Marina.
- ^Note 3: In Episode 9, the ratings were not published. Instead, the highest-rated player automatically became the "super-influencer," who could make the sole decision on whom to block.
- ^Note 4: In Episode 10, the influencers were not allowed to deliberate over who to block. Instead, they took turns saving other players, with the last player not saved being blocked from The Circle. Dumaresq, as the higher-rated of the two influencers, began by saving "Ana"/Raf, then JP saved "Luma"/Lucas & Marcel, and Dumaresq saved Marina. With the final selection, JP saved Ray, leaving Renan blocked from The Circle.
- ^Note 5: In Episode 12, the players made their final ratings, ultimately deciding who the winner of The Circle Brazil will be.
