= James Crossley (bodybuilder) =

English bodybuilder

James Hunter Crossley
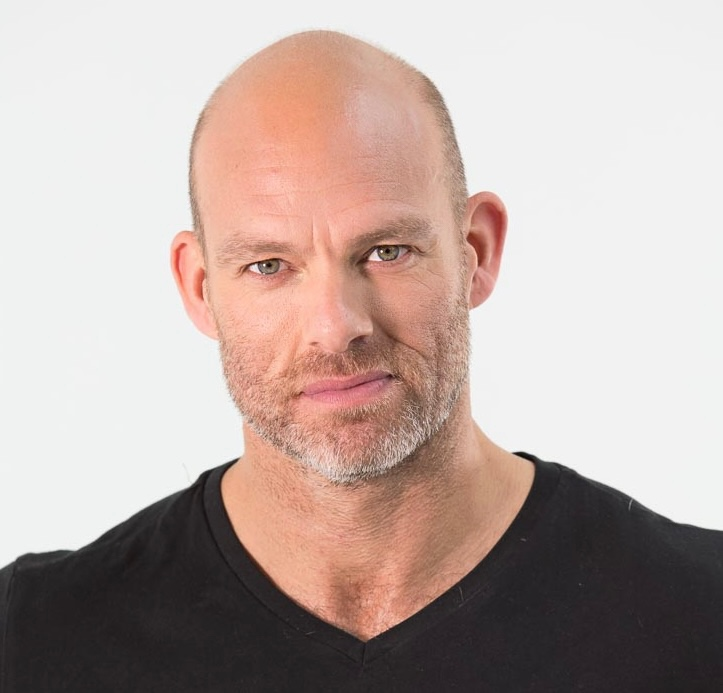
- Born: June 12, 1973 (age 52); York, England
- Occupations: Bodybuilder; Television Personality; Sound Healer; Handpan Player
- Television: Gladiators; The Circle
- Height: 6 ft 3 in (1.91 m)
- Website: soundhealingteachertraining.com

James Hunter Crossley (born 12 June 1973) is an English bodybuilder, television personality and musician. He appeared as Hunter in the sports entertainment series Gladiators from 1993 to 2000. He currently runs a sound healing teacher training school in SW London

== Life and career ==
Crossley appeared in the ITV game show Gladiators as "Hunter" from 1993 until the show's final episode on 1 January 2000. Often regarded by contenders as the show's most formidable Gladiator this was proven when he was crowned The Ultimate Gladiator after a showdown with the other male UK Gladiators in The Battle Of The Giants special in the show's penultimate final episode.

He returned to the format in the Sky reboot of Gladiators in 2008 appearing in the first “legends” special, which pitted the new Gladiators against some members of the original team. Here, he knocked out Spartan in one of his speciality events (Duel). He also hosted some online items for the show such as fronting interviews with the new generation of Gladiators and hosting additional backstage content.

Post Gladiators Crossley toured numerous theatre productions including Sir Peter Halls Shakespeare production of As You Like It. In May 2018, he broke the then world record for lifting the Dinnie Stones, with a time of 34.58 seconds.

A Fit At 40 campaigner in 2018 Crossley released a fitness DVD to help over 40s get in shape In 2021, he competed in the third series of the Channel 4 reality series The Circle. He played a catfish persona - NHS nurse Gemma, and pledged to donate half of the prize fund to the NHS if he won.

As of 2021, Crossley works as a musician and sound healer playing the handpan, gongs and other percussion instruments. He created Sound Healing Teacher Training, a school to certify gong bath practitioners based in SW London. In 2024 James opened up the London Handpan Academy, a school where students can learn to play the handpan.
