= Zazu =

Zazu may refer to:

== People ==
- Ray Farrugia (born 1955), Maltese football coach and former player nicknamed "Zazu"
- Éléa Zazu, runner-up in the French reality competition series The Circle
- Jessi Zazu, co-founder and former member of the rock band Those Darlins
- Samuel Zazu Westerfield Jr., American diplomat
- Zazu Nova, a participant in the 1969 Stonewall riots
- ZaSu Pitts (1894–1963), American actress sometimes credited as Zazu Pitts

== Arts and entertainment ==
- Zazu (The Lion King), a character in the film The Lion King
- Zazu Torque, a character in the anime and manga series Magic Knight Rayearth
- Zazu (album), 1986 debut album by Rosie Vela

== Other uses ==
- Cyclone Zazu (2020)
- ZAZU, the vehicle identification number of several models of the Citroën AX supermini car

== See also ==
- Zazou, a subculture in France during World War II
- Zasu
