= The Circle (British TV series) series 1 =

First series of The Circle

The Circle
- Series 1
- Presented by: Alice Levine; Maya Jama
- No. of days: 21
- No. of contestants: 15
- Winner: Alex "Kate" Hobern
- Runner-up: Freddie Bentley
- Other finalists: Sian Owen; Dan Mosaku
- No. of episodes: 18

Release
- Original network: Channel 4
- Original release: 18 September – 8 October 2018

Series chronology
- Next → Series 2

The first series of The Circle began on 18 September 2018 on Channel 4, and concluded after 21 days with a live final on 8 October 2018. This series was hosted by Alice Levine and Maya Jama on both the launch and the final, and was narrated by Sophie Willan. Ahead of the series it was announced that players would be competing against each other to become the most popular, but would never actually meet. Instead they would communicate through a specially designed app and be able to portray themselves in any way they choose. The series launched with a total of 1,607,000 including +1 catch-up services. It concluded with 1,125,000.

On 8 October 2018, the series was won by Alex Hobern, who had played the game claiming to be a 25-year-old woman called Kate, using photos of his real-life girlfriend Millie. Alex also won the "viewers champion" for an additional £25,000, claiming £75,000 in total. Freddie Bentley was the series runner-up.

Following this series, it was announced that Alice and Maya would not be returning for the second, with Emma Willis taking over the role as presenter instead.

== Players ==
The contestants taking part in the series were revealed on 18 September 2018. However throughout the series more players joined The Circle.

Name	Age	Hometown	Playing as	Entered	Exited	Status
Jennifer Freeman	40	Newcastle	Herself, but a doctor and younger (34)	Episode 1	Episode 2	Blocked
Mitchell Palmer	22	Norfolk	Himself	Episode 1	Episode 4	Blocked
Sinead Edwards	22	Carmarthenshire	"Christopher", a 65-year-old retired antiques dealer	Episode 3	Episode 6	Blocked
Aiden Bradbury	19	Wakefield	Herself	Episode 1	Episode 6	Blocked
Genelle Perkins	31	London	Herself, but not revealing that she's a mother with her daughter	Episode 1	Episode 10	Walked
Hannah Rosie Steadman	27	London	Herself	Episode 7	Episode 10	Blocked
Ryan Gooding	28	Ipswich	Himself	Episode 5	Episode 12	Blocked
Mairead Martin	57	Cheshire	Herself, but younger (32), and using another woman's photos	Episode 10	Episode 13	Blocked
Precious Muir	34	London	Herself, but younger (25)	Episode 12	Episode 15	Blocked
Scotty Forrester	36	London	Himself, but younger (31)	Episode 7	Episode 16	Blocked
Harry Southern	22	South Shields	Himself	Episode 12	Episode 17	Blocked
Dan Mosaku	28	London	Himself	Episode 1	Episode 18	Fourth place
Sian Owen	20	London	A “Plain Jane” version of herself	Episode 1	Episode 18	Third place
Freddie Bentley	20	Essex	Himself, but straight and older (24)	Episode 1	Episode 18	Runner-up
Alex Hobern	26	London	"Kate", a 25-year-old woman	Episode 1	Episode 18	Winner

== Results and elimination ==
For the first series, the contestants rated one another out of five throughout. At the end of each ratings their average scores were revealed from highest to lowest to the players. The two highest rated players became "influencers", while the remaining players were at risk of being "blocked" by the influencers.

Colour key
The contestant was blocked.
The contestant was an influencer.
The contestant was immune from being rated and blocked.

	Episode 2	Episode 4	Episode 6	Episode 10	Episode 12	Episode 13	Episode 15	Episode 16	Episode 17	Episode 18 Final	
Alex "Kate"	3.28	3.41	2.86	2.71	2.50	2.71	3.50	Not published	2.50	3.00	Winner (Episode 18)
Freddie	2.71	2.43	3.14	2.86	2.83	3.14	3.33	Not published	3.00	2.67	Runner-up (Episode 18)
Sian	3.00	3.14	2.43	3.00	3.17	3.29	4.00	Not published	4.25	2.33	Third place (Episode 18)
Dan	3.14	2.86	3.71	2.86	2.83	3.43	3.83	Not published	2.75	2.00	Fourth place (Episode 18)
Harry	Not in The Circle					Exempt	2.33	Not published	1.50	Blocked (Episode 17)	
Scotty	Not in The Circle			2.71	3.17	2.86	3.50	Not published	Blocked (Episode 16)		
Precious	Not in The Circle					Exempt	2.00	Blocked (Episode 15)			
Mairead	Not in The Circle				Exempt	2.57	Blocked (Episode 13)				
Ryan	Not in The Circle		Exempt	2.57	2.50	Blocked (Episode 12)					
Hannah	Not in The Circle			2.29	Blocked (Episode 10)						
Genelle	3.00	2.71	3.14	Walked (Episode 10)							
Aiden	2.86	2.57	2.57	Blocked (Episode 6)							
Sinead "Christopher"	Not in The Circle	Exempt	2.00	Blocked (Episode 6)							
Mitchell	2.43	2.86	Blocked (Episode 4)								
Jennifer	2.28	Blocked (Episode 2)									
Notes	none		1	2	none		3	4	none		
Influencers	Alex, Dan	Alex, Sian	Dan, Freddie, Genelle	none	Scotty, Sian	Dan, Sian	none	Sian	none		
Walked	none			Genelle	none						
Blocked	Jennifer; Influencers' choice to block	Mitchell; Influencers' choice to block	Sinead "Christopher"; Influencers' choice to block	Hannah; Lowest rated player	Ryan; Influencers' choice to block	Mairead; Influencers' choice to block	Precious; 3 of 5 votes to block	Scotty; Super-influencer's choice to block	Harry; Lowest rated player	Dan; Lowest rated player	Sian; Third highest rated player
Blocked	Jennifer; Influencers' choice to block	Mitchell; Influencers' choice to block	Aiden; Influencer's choice to block	Hannah; Lowest rated player	Ryan; Influencers' choice to block	Mairead; Influencers' choice to block	Precious; 3 of 5 votes to block	Scotty; Super-influencer's choice to block	Harry; Lowest rated player	Freddie; Second highest rated player	Alex "Kate"; Highest rated player

=== Notes ===
- ^Note 1: In Episode 6, as Freddie and Genelle tied on their ratings, they both joined Dan as influencers. The first ever double blocking was also held on the same day.
- ^Note 2: In Episode 10, although they were new players, Hannah and Scotty were eligible to be rated and ultimately blocked from the game. Genelle also received a rating, however it was not revealed as she chose to leave The Circle before the ratings were announced. Her ratings for the other players were still counted. Also, for the first time, there were no influencers; instead, the player with the lowest rating was automatically blocked from the game.
- ^Note 3: In Episode 15, as the bottom two players, Precious and Harry were at risk of being blocked. The other five players had to publicly cast their vote for which of the two to block from The Circle. Sian, Dan, Freddie voted for Precious. Scotty voted for Harry. "Kate"/Alex did not cast a vote, as a majority decision had already been reached.
- ^Note 4: In Episode 16, the top player was a secret super-influencer. The ratings were not revealed to the players nor the audience.
