= Zasu =

Zasu may refer to:

- ZaSu Pitts (1894–1963), American actress
- Zasu, Master of the seat, head of the temple (abbot) in Sōkan, the Japanese system of rankings for Buddhist clergy
- Zāsu (Zarth), 1984 computer game published by Enix
- Zasu River or Yazoo River, a river in the U.S. state of Mississippi
- Zasu, a thoroughbred horse, winner of the 1974 Champagne Stakes (Australia) and 1975 Queensland Oaks

== See also ==
- Zazu (disambiguation)
