= AJ Pritchard =

British dancer and choreographer (born 1994)

- Born: Alex Joseph Pritchard; 5 November 1994 (age 31); Stoke-on-Trent, Staffordshire, England
- Occupations: Dancer; choreographer; presenter
- Known for: Strictly Come Dancing
- Relatives: Curtis Pritchard (brother)

Alex Joseph Pritchard (born 5 November 1994) is a British dancer, choreographer and presenter. In 2013, he auditioned for the seventh series of Britain's Got Talent along with professional partner Chloe Hewitt, where they reached the semi-finals. From 2016 to 2019, Pritchard appeared as a professional dancer on the BBC One dance series Strictly Come Dancing. In 2020, he participated in the twentieth series of I'm a Celebrity...Get Me Out of Here!

He began presenting on GB News in October 2026.

== Early life ==
Pritchard was born on 5 November 1994 in Sneyd Green, Stoke-on-Trent. He began dancing at the age of 12, and his parents partnered him with Chloe Hewitt from their dance school. He has a younger brother, Curtis, a fellow dance professional, who appeared on Dancing with the Stars in Ireland.

== Career ==
In 2013, Pritchard and his professional dance partner Hewitt auditioned for Britain's Got Talent; the pair eventually reached the live semi-finals. In September 2018, Pritchard took part in BBC's Celebrity MasterChef leaving the show after his apple crumble infuriated the judges.

In October 2018, Pritchard was featured in a photo-shoot in the October issue of gay magazine Attitude. That same month, he partnered with Louis Smith in the celebrity version of Hunted, in aid of Stand Up to Cancer.

In July 2019, it was announced that Pritchard, along with his brother Curtis, would appear as guest choreographers on the BBC Three reality series RuPaul's Drag Race UK.

In November 2020, it was announced that Pritchard would be contestant on the twentieth series of I'm a Celebrity...Get Me Out of Here. He became the seventh celebrity to be eliminated alongside Mo Farah on 2 December.

In February 2021, it was announced that Pritchard would be making his acting debut in the Channel 4 soap opera Hollyoaks, alongside his brother. He portrayed the role of Marco; their acting abilities were the subject of widespread criticism.

In October 2022, Pritchard was one of four finalists who completed series 4 of Celebrity SAS: Who Dares Wins.

In February 2023, he competed on the reality-competition series The Challenge UK.

In 2026, Pritchard joined the cast of Dancing with the Stars: The Next Pro, with a critical reception after comments had been made about their British sister show Strictly Come Dancing following his departure in 2019. He would later become a runner-up on the show, losing to Adele Zaikman.

In October 2026, he took up a new role on GB News as a presenter.

== Strictly Come Dancing ==
In 2016, Pritchard appeared as a professional in the BBC dance show, Strictly Come Dancing for its fourteenth series. He was partnered with Olympic artistic gymnast Claudia Fragapane. They were eliminated in the semi-finals on 11 December 2016, finishing in 4th place overall. In his first series, Pritchard received praise for his innovative choreography.

Pritchard returned to Strictly the following year for his second series, and was partnered with Mollie King, a singer and former member of girl group The Saturdays. The pair made it to week 12, being knocked out at the semi-final stage and finishing in 5th place overall. In his third series in 2018, he was partnered with British Paralympic athlete Lauren Steadman. They were eliminated at the semi-final stage, finishing in 5th place, in Pritchard's third consecutive semi-final elimination.

In March 2019, Pritchard was confirmed to be returning to Strictly for his fourth series. In September 2019. it was revealed that he would partner vlogger Saffron Barker. They were eliminated on week 10, making this the first and only series where Pritchard failed to reach the semi-final. Despite being confirmed in the 2020 professional line-up, on 26 March 2020, Pritchard announced that he was leaving the show in order to pursue a career in presenting.

Series	Partner	Place	Average score
14	Claudia Fragapane	4th	33.1
15	Mollie King	5th	27.0
16	Lauren Steadman	5th	26.6
17	Saffron Barker	6th	29.9

Highest and Lowest Scoring Per Dance

Dance	Partner	Highest	Partner	Lowest
American Smooth	Claudia Fragapane	36	Mollie King	30
Argentine Tango	Claudia Fragapane	36	Lauren Steadman	25
Cha-cha-cha	Mollie King	27	Lauren Steadman	20
Charleston	Claudia Fragapane	36	Lauren Steadman	22
Couple's Choice	Saffron Barker	33	Lauren Steadman	24
Dance A Thon	Claudia Fragapane	3	Mollie King	1
Foxtrot	Saffron Barker	38	Mollie King	27
Jive	Claudia Fragapane	36	Mollie King	23
Paso Doble	Claudia Fragapane	33	Mollie King	22
Quickstep	Claudia Fragapane	38	Lauren Steadman	25
Rumba	Claudia Fragapane	35	Mollie King	31
Salsa	Claudia Fragapane	37	Lauren Steadman	23
Samba	Claudia Fragapane	32	Lauren Steadman	23
Showdance				
Tango	Lauren Steadman	31	Mollie King	25
Viennese Waltz	Claudia Fragapane	36	Mollie King	24
Waltz	Saffron Barker	39	Lauren Steadman	25

=== Claudia Fragapane ===
He partnered Olympic artistic gymnast Claudia Fragapane for the fourteenth season of Strictly Come Dancing.

Week №	Dance / Song	Judges' scores				Score	Result
Week №	Dance / Song	Revel Horwood	Bussell	Goodman	Tonioli	Score	Result
1	Cha-cha-cha / "What Makes You Beautiful"	6	6	7	7	26	No Elimination
2	Waltz / "You Light Up My Life"	6	8	8	8	30	Safe
3	Charleston / "You Give a Little Love"	9	9	9	9	36	Safe
4	Foxtrot / "I Really Like You"	6	8	8	8	30	Safe
5	Samba / "Young Hearts Run Free"	8	7	8	9	32	Safe
6	American Smooth / "Black Magic"	9	9	9	9	36	Safe
7	Paso Doble / "Shut Up and Dance"	8	8	8	9	33	Safe
8	Viennese Waltz / "Breakaway"	9	9	9	9	36	Safe
9	Jive / "Mickey"	9	9	9	9	36	Bottom two
10	Argentine Tango / "Cry Me a River"	9	9	9	9	36	Safe
10	Cha-cha-cha Challenge / "I Like It Like That"	Awarded 3 extra points				39	Safe
11	Salsa / "I Just Can't Wait to Be King"	9	9	9	10	37	Safe
12	Rumba / "Bleeding Love"	8	9	9	9	35	Eliminated
12	Quickstep / "When You're Smiling"	9	9	10	10	38	Eliminated

=== Mollie King ===
For the fifteenth season of Strictly Come Dancing he partnered English singer-songwriter and presenter Mollie King.

Week №	Dance / Song	Judges' scores				Score	Result
Week №	Dance / Song	Revel Horwood	Bussell	Ballas	Tonioli	Score	Result
1	Jive / "Good Golly, Miss Molly"	4	6	7	6	23	No Elimination
2	Tango / "Addicted to Love"	4	6	8	7	25	Safe
3	American Smooth / "Climb Ev'ry Mountain"	7	7	8	8	30	Safe
4	Salsa / "Súbeme la Radio"	6	7	7	7	27	Safe
5	Viennese Waltz / "Anyone Who Had a Heart"	8	8	8	8	32	Safe
6	Cha-cha-cha / "Better the Devil You Know"	6	7	7	7	27	Bottom two
7	Foxtrot / "Call Me Irresponsible"	6	7	7	7	27	Bottom two
8	Paso Doble / "Layla"	5	6	6	5	22	Safe
9	Charleston / "Wings"	6	7	8	8	29	Safe
10	Quickstep / "Umbrella"	7	7	8	9	31	Safe
10	Paso Doble-thon	Awarded 2 extra points				33	Safe
11	Rumba / "Hopelessly Devoted to You"	6	7	9	9	31	Safe
12	Samba / "Whenever, Wherever"	4	7	7	6	24	Eliminated
12	Waltz / "Angel"	8	8	8	8	32	Eliminated

=== Lauren Steadman ===
He partnered British Paralympic athlete Lauren Steadman for the sixteenth season of Strictly Come Dancing.

Week №	Dance / Song	Judges' scores				Score	Result
Week №	Dance / Song	Revel Horwood	Bussell	Ballas	Tonioli	Score	Result
1	Waltz / "Kissing You"	6	6	6	7	25	No Elimination
2	Charleston / "New Rules"	5	6	5	6	22	Safe
3	Cha-cha-cha / "Fame"	4	5	5	6	20	Safe
4	Quickstep / "If You're Over Me"	6	6	6	7	25	Safe
5	Couples Choice: Contemporary / "Runnin'"	4	6	7	7*	24	Safe
6	Paso Doble / "Poison"	6	7	8	8	29	Safe
7	Jive / "Girlfriend"	7	8	8	8	31	Safe
8	Viennese Waltz / "You Are the Reason"	8	8	9	9	34	Safe
9	Argentine Tango / "River"	5	6	7	7	25	Safe
10	Salsa / "Familiar"	5	6	6	6	23	Safe
10	Lindy Hop-thon / "Do Your Thing"	Awarded 1 extra point				24	Safe
11	American Smooth / "I'm in Love with a Wonderful Guy"	8	9	9	9	35	Safe
12	Tango / "Nutbush City Limits"	7	8	8	8	31	Eliminated
12	Samba / "Rock the Boat"	5	6	6	6	23	Eliminated

- Score was awarded by guest judge Alfonso Ribeiro

=== Saffron Barker ===
He partnered television presenter YouTube personality and author Saffron Barker for the seventeenth season of Strictly Come Dancing. They were eliminated in week 10, coming sixth.

Week №	Dance / Song	Judges' scores				Score	Result
Week №	Dance / Song	Revel Horwood	Mabuse	Ballas	Tonioli	Score	Result
1	Tango / "Lips Are Movin"	6	7	7	7	27	No Elimination
2	Cha-cha-cha / "One Touch"	5	5	6	7	23	Safe
3	Paso Doble / "Everybody Wants to Rule the World"	7	7	7	7	28	Safe
4	Contemporary / "Because You Loved Me"	7	8	9	9	33	Safe
5	Foxtrot / "Theme From New York, New York"	9	10	9	10*	38	Safe
6	Jive / "Every Little Thing She Does Is Magic"	8	8	8	9	33	Safe
7	Salsa / "Instruction"	6	7	7	7	27	Safe
8	Waltz / "Your Song"	9	10	10	10	39	Safe
9	Quickstep / "I Went to a Marvellous Party"	8	9	9	9	35	Bottom Two
10	Samba / "Walking on Sunshine"	5	7	7	7	26	Eliminated

- Score was awarded by guest judge Alfonso Ribeiro

== Personal life ==
Pritchard has OCD and dyslexia, and is colour blind. On 27 December 2018, Pritchard and his brother Curtis, along with two others, were attacked in an "unprovoked assault" on a night out in Nantwich. Pritchard suffered bruising to his face, arms, legs and body.
