= Katie Roe Carr =

British TV personality

Katie Roe Carr is a British television personality. She is mostly known for her appearances and performances in Channel 4 documentary Date My Mum and in the shows The Circle and Lorraine.

== Biography and career ==
Katie is from Hampshire, England. She is known to run a tanning salon from 2005 and an online hair accessory store named Honey Berri. Katie being a single mother of four children, first appeared on Channel 4's documentary Date My Mum in the year 2016 where her sons Jay and Harry arranged a date for Katie Roe Carr in the quest to find love. In 2019 she appeared in Channel 4 show, The Circle while performing as a catfish as her son Jay. In the same year she also appeared on the Lorraine on ITV.

== Filmography ==
Year	Title	Format	Production	References
2016	Date My Mum	Documentary	Channel 4	
2019	The Circle	Television Series	Channel 4	
2019	Lorraine	Television Series	ITV	
