= The Circle (British TV series) series 3 =

Third series of The Circle

The Circle
- Series 3
- Presented by: Emma Willis
- No. of days: 24
- No. of contestants: 15
- Winner: Natalya Platonova as "Felix"
- Runner-up: Manrika Khaira
- Other finalists: Andy Smith; Hashu Mohammed; Joey Alabi; Pippa Walker
- No. of episodes: 21

Release
- Original network: Channel 4
- Original release: 16 March – 9 April 2021

Additional information
- Filming dates: 13 September – 6 October 2020

Series chronology
- ← Previous; Series 2

The third and final series of The Circle began airing on Channel 4 on 16 March 2021, hosted by Emma Willis, and concluded on 9 April 2021 following twenty-one episodes. The series premiered after the conclusion of The Celebrity Circle. Due to the COVID-19 pandemic, the series was pre-recorded from 13 September 2020 to 6 October 2020.

On 9 April 2021, the series was won by Natalya Platonova, who had played the game catfishing as "Felix", a 29-year-old Paratrooper. Manrika Khaira was the runner-up of the series. Both players finished joint-first in the final ratings, but due to Natalya receiving the most top ranks, she was crowned overall winner. In a change from previous series, there was no viewers winner. Instead, Natalya received the full £100,000 prize fund. In May 2021, Channel 4 announced that it would not be renewing the show and that season 3 would be the last.

== Format changes ==
Due to the series being pre-recorded, the weekly live shows that featured in the previous series were axed and instead replaced by a regular highlights episode. Unlike previous series, host Emma Willis delivered video messages to the players informing them of upcoming twists, similar to the spin-off Celebrity series. These messages could be private to the players or shown to the group. Due to being pre-recorded, the viewers vote at the end of the series was also axed. Instead, the winner from the series received the full prize fund of £100,000.

== Players ==
The first set of contestants taking part in the series were revealed on 13 March 2021.

Name	Age	Hometown	Playing as		Entered	Exited	Status	Ref.
Jamie Dutton-Forshaw	57	Hampshire	Father & Daughter playing as "Penny", a 49-year-old letting agent		Episode 1	Episode 4	Blocked	
Millie Dutton-Forshaw	20	Hampshire	Father & Daughter playing as "Penny", a 49-year-old letting agent		Episode 1	Episode 4	Blocked	
Yolanda Thomas (Note: Yolanda became the first player to be blocked during the first episode. However, rather than leaving The Circle, she stayed to become a clone of one of her fellow players. She chose to clone Tally.)	30	London	"Chris", her 29-year-old husband, but single	A clone of "Tally"	Episode 1	Episode 4	Blocked	
Billy Dawson	19	Essex	Himself		Episode 1	Episode 8	Blocked	
Tally Brattle	23	Worthing	Herself, but single		Episode 1	Episode 10	Blocked	
James Crossley	47	London	"Gemma", a 31-year-old NHS nurse		Episode 1	Episode 13	Blocked	
Vithun Illankovan	23	London	Himself		Episode 1	Episode 14	Blocked	
Scott Paige	30	Manchester	"Dorothy", his 85 year-old grandmother		Episode 5	Episode 19	Blocked	
Shabaz Ali	29	Blackburn	"Alice", a 23-year-old teacher		Episode 17	Episode 21	Blocked	
Pippa Walker (Note: Joey and Pippa joined forces during Episode 16 to become "Tom")	26	Manchester	Herself	"Tom", a 29-year-old priest	Episode 11	Episode 21	Fifth place	
Joey Alabi	26	London	"Femi", a Nigerian immigrant version of himself	"Tom", a 29-year-old priest	Episode 11	Episode 21	Fifth place	
Hashu Mohammed	28	Birmingham	"Syed", a 63-year-old restaurant owner		Episode 1	Episode 21	Fourth place	
Andy Smith	34	Solihull	Himself		Episode 1	Episode 21	Third place	
Manrika Khaira	24	Birmingham	Herself		Episode 1	Episode 21	Runner-up	
Natalya Platonova	30	Reigate	"Felix", a 29 year-old paratrooper		Episode 5	Episode 21	Winner	

== Results and elimination ==
Colour key
The contestant was blocked.
The contestant was an influencer.
The contestant was immune from being rated and blocked.
The contestant was blocked, but returned as a different contestant.
The contestant was at risk of being blocked following a twist.

		Episode 1	Episode 3	Episode 4	Episode 7	Episode 9	Episode 12	Episode 14	Episode 16	Episode 18	Episode 20	Episode 21 Final	
Natalya "Felix"		Not in The Circle			Exempt	Not published	=2nd	2nd	1st	5th	Not published	=1st	Winner (Episode 21)
Manrika		=6th	5th	Yolanda to block	1st	Not published	Exempt	1st	3rd	=1st	Not published	=1st	Runner-up (Episode 21)
Andy		3rd	2nd	Yolanda to block	2nd	Not published	1st	5th	7th	3rd	1st	3rd	Third place (Episode 21)
Hashu "Syed"		8th	1st	Yolanda to block	=4th	Not published	4th	=3rd	4th	=1st	Not published	4th	Fourth place (Episode 21)
Joey "Femi"	"Tom"	Not in The Circle					Exempt	6th	6th	Exempt	Not published	5th	Fifth place (Episode 21)
Pippa	"Tom"	Not in The Circle					Exempt	7th	5th	Exempt	Not published	5th	Fifth place (Episode 21)
Shabaz "Alice"		Not in The Circle								Exempt	Not published	Blocked (Episode 21)	
Scott "Dorothy"		Not in The Circle			Exempt	Not published	=2nd	=3rd	2nd	4th	Blocked (Episode 19)		
Vithun		=4th	3rd	Tally to block	=4th	Not published	5th	8th	Blocked (Episode 14)				
James "Gemma"		1st	=6th	Yolanda to block	=4th	Not published	6th	Blocked (Episode 13)					
Tally		=6th	Exempt	Not eligible to vote	3rd	Not published	Blocked (Episode 10)						
Billy		2nd	=6th	Tally to block	7th	Blocked (Episode 8)							
Yolanda "Chris"	"Tally"	=4th	Exempt	Not eligible to vote	Blocked (Episode 4)								
Jamie & Millie "Penny"		9th	4th	Blocked (Episode 4)									
Notes		1	2	3	4	5	6	none	7	none	8	9	
Influencers		James	Andy, Hashu	none	Andy, Manrika	Andy	Andy, Manrika	Manrika, Natalya	Natalya, Scott	Hashu, Manrika	Andy	none	
Blocked		Yolanda "Chris"; Influencer's choice to block	Jamie & Millie "Penny"; Influencers' choice to block	Yolanda "Tally"; 4 of 6 votes to block	Billy; Influencers' choice to block	Tally; Blocker's choice to block	James "Gemma"; Influencers' choice to block	Vithun; Influencers' choice to block	Pippa; Natalya's choice to block	Scott "Dorothy"; Influencers' choice to block	Shabaz "Alice"; Super Influencer's choice to block	Joey & Pippa "Tom"; Lowest rated player	Hashu "Syed"; Fourth highest rated player
Blocked		Yolanda "Chris"; Influencer's choice to block	Jamie & Millie "Penny"; Influencers' choice to block	Yolanda "Tally"; 4 of 6 votes to block	Billy; Influencers' choice to block	Tally; Blocker's choice to block	James "Gemma"; Influencers' choice to block	Vithun; Influencers' choice to block	Pippa; Natalya's choice to block	Scott "Dorothy"; Influencers' choice to block	Shabaz "Alice"; Super Influencer's choice to block	Andy; Third highest rated player	Manrika; Highest rated player
Blocked		Yolanda "Chris"; Influencer's choice to block	Jamie & Millie "Penny"; Influencers' choice to block	Yolanda "Tally"; 4 of 6 votes to block	Billy; Influencers' choice to block	Tally; Blocker's choice to block	James "Gemma"; Influencers' choice to block	Vithun; Influencers' choice to block	Joey "Femi"; Scott's choice to block	Scott "Dorothy"; Influencers' choice to block	Shabaz "Alice"; Super Influencer's choice to block	Andy; Third highest rated player	Manrika; Highest rated player
Blocked		Yolanda "Chris"; Influencer's choice to block	Jamie & Millie "Penny"; Influencers' choice to block	Yolanda "Tally"; 4 of 6 votes to block	Billy; Influencers' choice to block	Tally; Blocker's choice to block	James "Gemma"; Influencers' choice to block	Vithun; Influencers' choice to block	Joey "Femi"; Scott's choice to block	Scott "Dorothy"; Influencers' choice to block	Shabaz "Alice"; Super Influencer's choice to block	Natalya "Felix"; Highest rated player	

=== Notes ===
- ^Note 1 : After Yolanda was blocked, she was told that she was still in the game, and that she had to clone a persona of another participant to continue playing. She chose to clone Tally.
- ^Note 2 : In this round, Tally and Yolanda were immune because of the ongoing clone twist.
- ^Note 3 : In this round, there were no ratings. Instead, players had to vote between Tally and Yolanda as to who should be blocked.
- ^Note 4 : In this round, James was given a secret mission to try and get a player of his choice blocked. If he failed his mission, then he would be blocked, if he succeeded he would become immune at the next blocking. He chose to target Billy. As he was successful in getting Billy blocked, James earned immunity for the next round.
- ^Note 5 : In this round, there were no influencers. Instead, the two lowest rated players, Scott and Tally would be at risk of being blocked. It was then up to the remaining players to vote for one influencer who would hold the sole responsibility of blocking one of the players at risk.
- ^Note 6 : In this round, the two new players Joey and Pippa chose one person to become an influencer. The remaining players rated each other to determine the second influencer.
- ^Note 7 : In this round, the two influencers, Natalya and Scott were given the opportunity to block each other. They chose not to do so. Instead, they had to choose two other players to block, picking one player each. Natalya chose Pippa, and Scott picked Femi respectively. Following the blocking, Joey and Pippa continued in the game together as new player Tom.
- ^Note 8 : In this round, the top rated player was a secret super-influencer, whose identity was not revealed to the other players. The ratings were not revealed to the players nor the audience. The secret super influencer had to block a fellow player face-to-face.
- ^Note 9 : Natalya and Manrika both placed 1st in the ratings. However, Natalya won the series due to being ranked 1st the most in the final ratings.

== Reception ==
The Guardian reviewed the series positively in the final week, describing it as "The next Big Brother" and embracing "the unnatural nature of reality TV", though "twists may have tipped slightly into excess in the final week".

Manrika Khaira was singled out for abuse and death threats on social media during the airing of the programmes. Digital Spy put this down to young women being "often seen to be 'acting above their station' if they are anything but apologetic and accommodating to others. Other factors, such as race, can also compound this issue." Digital Spy concluded that she was "getting a lot of air time at the moment, which just goes to show that without her involvement there can't be much else happening in The Circle that would be worth us watching." After the series finale, Khaira's management company asked Channel 4 to stop posting content about her, in an attempt to reduce the backlash.

The i newspaper described players "Syed" and Andy as "beloved both in and out of The Circle" and described Manrika as "a reality TV gift". It concluded that the series had "made for exceptional television, gripping us with twists and turns every night".

=== Viewing figures ===
Official, 28-day consolidated ratings are taken from BARB and include Channel 4 +1. Catch-up service totals are added to the official ratings.

	Viewers (millions)			
	Week 1	Week 2	Week 3	Week 4
Sunday	No episode	1.37	No episode	1.32
Monday	No episode	1.37	1.37	1.48
Tuesday	1.74	1.24	1.31	1.52
Wednesday	1.41	1.41	1.61	1.47
Thursday	1.39	1.49	1.54	1.44
Friday	1.55	1.67	1.86	1.72
Weekly average	1.52	1.43	1.54	1.49
Running average	1.52	1.46	1.49	1.55
Series average	1.55			
