= Girlfriends (2012 TV series) =

- Genre: Reality
- Presented by: Emma Willis
- Country of origin: United Kingdom
- Original language: English
- No. of series: 2
- No. of episodes: 16

Production
- Running time: 60 minutes (inc. adverts)
- Production company: Studio Lambert

Original release
- Network: ITV2
- Release: 26 September 2012 – 2 October 2013

Girlfriends is a British reality television show presented by Emma Willis that began airing on ITV2 in 2012. A second series was aired in autumn 2013, each series features three single young women looking for love.

== Background ==
The Girlfriends reality TV series is based on a format developed by Israel's Keshet Media Group, first broadcast in Israel in October 2011. In the UK the format is produced by Studio Lambert and broadcast by ITV's digital channel, ITV2. An American version was aired briefly in July 2012 on CBS, however was pulled from the schedule following low ratings for its first two episodes.

=== Plot ===
Three single women (the 'girlfriends') each try to find the ideal man, with 100 single men to choose from. The girlfriends share a large house for the duration of the series. The first part of the series is an audition format where the 100 men introduce themselves in turn to the three women in the house. The girlfriends decide between them whether either (or two, or all) of them would like to see the man again. They each choose a total of six men they would like to see again.

The second part of the series sees the girlfriends go on dates with the men. The dates become longer, allowing the women the opportunity to decide who they want to visit for a 24-hour date in the man's home town and, finally, whether they want to invite any of the final dates back to their hometown to meet their parents.

The 2012 and 2013 series were hosted by TV presenter, Emma Willis.

== The Girlfriends ==
=== Series 1 ===
The three women looking for love in Series 1 were Laura, Amy and mother of one, Sarah.

Laura ultimately chose a Frenchman called Ken. Amy chose 'cheeky' Charlie. Sarah Taylor chose footballer Danny Wisker, but admitted she never saw him again and discovered he had participated in other reality shows such as TOWIE.

=== Series 2 ===
Ruby Perry

A 20-year-old from the Bransholme area of Hull, who had spent the previous 12 months travelling around the world.

Sophia Gowland

A 23-year-old business management graduate and account manager from Hemlington, Middlesbrough.

Melissa Travis

A 26-year-old Manchester United fan from Sale, Greater Manchester.

== Reception ==
=== Viewing figures ===
The 2012 series of Girlfriends had an average viewing figures of 445,000 viewers (1.7% of the available total), with a peak of 552,000 for the final programme on 17 November.

=== Media criticism ===
Reaction from TV critics was generally mixed. Of the first series The Metro described it as "too ITV2 to yield classy results" and "felt pretty sleazy and not at all in line with the romantic vibe". Stuart Heritage in The Guardian admitted that the series showed the viewer far more than any previous dating show, from "the first rush of infatuation [to] the indecision and jealousy and awkwardness that inevitably follows", but concluded that the girls have "too much choice. The audition round has conditioned them to nitpick, to always expect that something better is around the corner. Clearly this isn't the case for most of us. We don't all have 100 attractive would-be lovers prepared to backflip for our affections".

== Transmissions ==
Series	Start date	End date	Episodes
1	26 September 2012	14 November 2012	8
2	14 August 2013	2 October 2013	8
