= Studio Lambert =

British TV production company

- Type: Subsidiary
- Industry: Television
- Founded: 2008; 18 years ago
- Founder: Stephen Lambert
- Headquarters: London, United Kingdom; Los Angeles, United States; Manchester, United Kingdom; Glasgow, United Kingdom
- Number of locations: 4
- Key people: Stephen Lambert (CEO); Tim Harcourt (Chief Creative Officer); Susan Hogg (Head of Drama); Jack Burgess (EVP, SL USA)
- Services: Television production
- Owner: All3Media (2012–2026); Banijay Entertainment (2026–present)
- Parent: Banijay UK (2026–present)
- Divisions: Studio Lambert USA; Studio Lambert North; Studio Lambert Scotland
- Subsidiaries: Inner Drive Entertainment; MindMeld Entertainment
- Website: www.studiolambert.com

Studio Lambert is a British television production company based in London, Manchester, Glasgow and Los Angeles. It creates and produces scripted and unscripted programs for British and American broadcasters, cable networks and streaming platforms. It is part of Banijay UK, the British division of Banijay Entertainment, the global production group.

Stephen Lambert, creator of many global formats, launched the company in 2008. Tim Harcourt joined in 2012, first as head of development then becoming chief creative officer. The company quickly grew a reputation on both sides of the Atlantic for making "innovative" and popular unscripted shows. Studio Lambert is known for many productions including award-winning global hits Undercover Boss, Gogglebox, The Traitors UK and The Traitors US as well as Race Across the World, The Circle and Four in a Bed. In 2022, it was announced Netflix had given Studio Lambert a series order for the biggest reality competition ever, Squid Game: The Challenge – a co-production with The Garden, featuring 456 players and a prize of $4.56m.

In the 2024 Broadcast Magazine survey of independent UK production companies, Studio Lambert ranked #3 by size of turnover. In 2019 and in 2024, the same survey ranked the company #1 in its peer poll. Studio Lambert won Best Independent Production Company at the Broadcast Awards in 2020, 2024 and 2025, and won Production Company of the Year at the Edinburgh TV Awards 2024.

A scripted division was established in 2015 to produce high quality drama series with British and American writers, directors and on-screen talent. The company's first scripted show, Three Girls, won five BAFTA awards in 2018. The Feed launched on Prime Video in 2019, The Nest premiered on BBC One to high ratings and acclaim in 2020, and Three Families launched in 2021. Premiering in 2024, critically rated Boarders became the company's first returning drama.

The original 'Studio Lambert' was a television adverts production company in the 1960s, 70s and 80s run by Stephen Lambert's father, Roger Lambert, a director of many television adverts.

At the start of November 2018, Studio Lambert had established a new North production office based in Manchester and created a new production division that would produce programming based in its Manchester office named Studio Lambert North, marking Studio Lambert's third production office with it being based in Manchester with Studio Lambert had appointed the executive producer of Dragon's Den, Darrell Olsen, to head Studio Lambert's new Manchetser based production unit Studio Lambert North as president of the new unit & Studio Lambert North had taken over production of Studio Lambert's shows like Naked Attraction the following year in 2019.

In September 2021 following the successful opening of Studio Lambert's Manchester-based operation & production division Studio Lambert North, back in November 2018, Studio Lambert expanded its production operations into Scotland by opening up a new production office based in the Scottish Highlands based at Inverness and in Glasgow, Scotland & launched a new Scottish production division entitled Studio Lambert Scotland, Studio Lambert had previously produced its scripted series The Nest in Scotland & the formation of Studio Lambert Scotland will produce & develop programming based in the Scottish highlands starting with the British and American adaptations of the Dutch format De Verraders originally made by All3Media's fellow production subsidiary IPTV, entitled The Traitors and The Traitors US, marking Studio Lambert Scotland's first productions.

In January 2026 following the launch of Studio Lambert's first American production subsidiary MindMeld Entertainment back in June 2025, Studio Lambert had partnered with longtime collaborators, actors and game show format creators Jon Barinholtz and Rob Belushi to formed a newly-formed & Studio Lambert's second American unscripted production & development subsidiary entitled Inner Drive Entertainment that would sit under Studio Lambert's American production division Studio Lambert USA, the new production subsidiary Inner Drive Entertainment would develop & produce unscripted television formats including game shows, challenge formats, social experiment programs, and reality-competition series with Jon Barinholtz and Rob Belushi serving as co-presidents & will work closey with Studio Lambert USA's president Jack Burgess.

== Programming ==
Title	Years	Network	Notes
Undercover Boss	2009–2021	Channel 4/ITV	Also known as Undercover Big Boss
Undercover Boss USA	2010–2022	CBS	co-production with All3Media America
Ultimate Traveller	2010	Channel 4	
Southern Fried Stings	2010–2011	TruTV	co-production with Zoo Productions
Four in a Bed	2010–present	Channel 4	
Love Thy Neighbour	2011	Channel 4/More 4	
The Pitch	2012–2013	AMC	co-production with All3Media America and AMC Studios
Girlfriends	2012–2013	ITV2	
Gogglebox	2013–present	Channel 4	
How to Get a Council House	2013–2016	Channel 4	Originally titled I Want a Council House
The Million Second Quiz	2013	NBC	co-production with All3Media America, Ryan Seacrest Productions, Bill's Market & Television Productions and Universal Television
The People's Couch	2013–2016	Bravo	co-production with All3Media America and Bravo Media Productions; Co-owned by NBCUniversal Syndication Studios
True Tori	2014	Lifetime	co-production with All3Media America, Life in the Bowl Productions and Big Country Entertainment
The Great Interior Design Challenge	2014–2017	BBC Two	
Inside Job	2014	TNT	co-production with All3Media America and TNT Originals, Inc. Owned by Warner Bros. Discovery
Tattoo Fixers	2015–2019	E4	
Job or No Job	2015	ABC Family	co-production with All3Media America; Owned by Disney Platform Distribution
The Fear	2015	BBC Three	
Body Fixers	2016–2017	E4	
Naked Attraction	2016–2024	Channel 4	as Studio Lambert North
Gogglebox Ireland	2016–present	Virgin Media One	co-production with Kite Entertainment
Tattoo Artist of the Year	2017	E4	
Second Wives Club	2017	E!	co-production with All3Media America
Three Girls	2017	BBC One	
Spa Wars	2017	ITVBe	
Buy It Now	2018	Channel 4	as Glitterbox
The Circle	2018–2021	Channel 4	Part of The Circle franchise; co-production with Motion Content Group
Race Across the World	2019–present	BBC Two; BBC One	
The Feed	2019	Virgin Media; Amazon Prime Video	co-productiom with Amazon Studios, All3Media International and Liberty Global
The Circle US	2020–present	Netflix/Hulu	co-production with Motion Content Group
The Circle Brazil	2020	Netflix	co-production with Motion Content Group
The Circle France	2020	Netflix	co-production with Motion Content Group
Celebrity Watch Party	2020	Fox	co-production with All3Media America
The Hustler	2021	ABC	co-production with All3Media America
Three Families	2021	BBC One	
Lovestruck High	2022	Amazon Prime Video	co-production with Amazon Studios
The Traitors	2022–present	BBC One	as Studio Lambert Scotland
The Traitors US	2023–present	Peacock	as Studio Lambert Scotland
Celebrity Race Across the World	2023–present	BBC One	
Squid Game: The Challenge	2023–present	Netflix	co-production with The Garden
Boarders	2024–2026	BBC Three	
The Anonymous	2024	USA Network	
Buy It Now USA	2024	Amazon Prime Video	An American adaptation of Buy It Now co-production with Amazon MGM Studios
The Celebrity Traitors	2025–present	BBC One	as Studio Lambert Scotland
The Grand Tour	2026–present	Amazon Prime Video	co-production with Amazon MGM Studios
Monopoly	TBA	Netflix	co-production with Hasbro Entertainment

== Awards ==
Studio Lambert won Best Independent Production Company at the Broadcast Awards in 2020, 2024 and 2025, and won Production Company of the Year at the Edinburgh TV Awards 2024.

The Traitors UK has won multiple BAFTA Television Awards, Edinburgh TV Awards, RTS Programme Awards and BPG Awards.

In 2023, The Traitors US earned an Emmy Awards nomination and won for Outstanding Casting for a Reality Program. In 2024, it won the Primetime Emmy Award for Outstanding Reality Competition Program.

Gogglebox has won numerous awards. In 2014 and 2022, it won a BAFTA in the Reality & Constructed Factual category. From 2015 to 2018, in 2021 and in 2022, it won a National Television Award. The format won a Rose d'Or Award in 2014.

Race Across the World won a BAFTA in 2020 for Best Reality & Constructed Factual. It also won a Broadcast Award in 2021 for Best Popular Factual Programme and has been nominated twice for the Grierson Awards. In 2024, Celebrity Race Across the World won a BAFTA for Best Factual Entertainment.

Undercover Boss is a two-time Emmy Awards-winning series, which has been nominated multiple times for the Critics' Choice Television Awards.

BBC One limited drama series Three Girls won five BAFTAs including the award for Best Mini-Series. It won Best TV Drama at Prix Italia 2018, alongside winning awards at the RTS Programme Awards, BPG Awards, Broadcast Awards and Edinburgh TV Awards.

The Circle won the C21 International Format Award for Best Competition Reality Format in 2019.
