= Tim Wilson (British politician) =

English animator and former politician

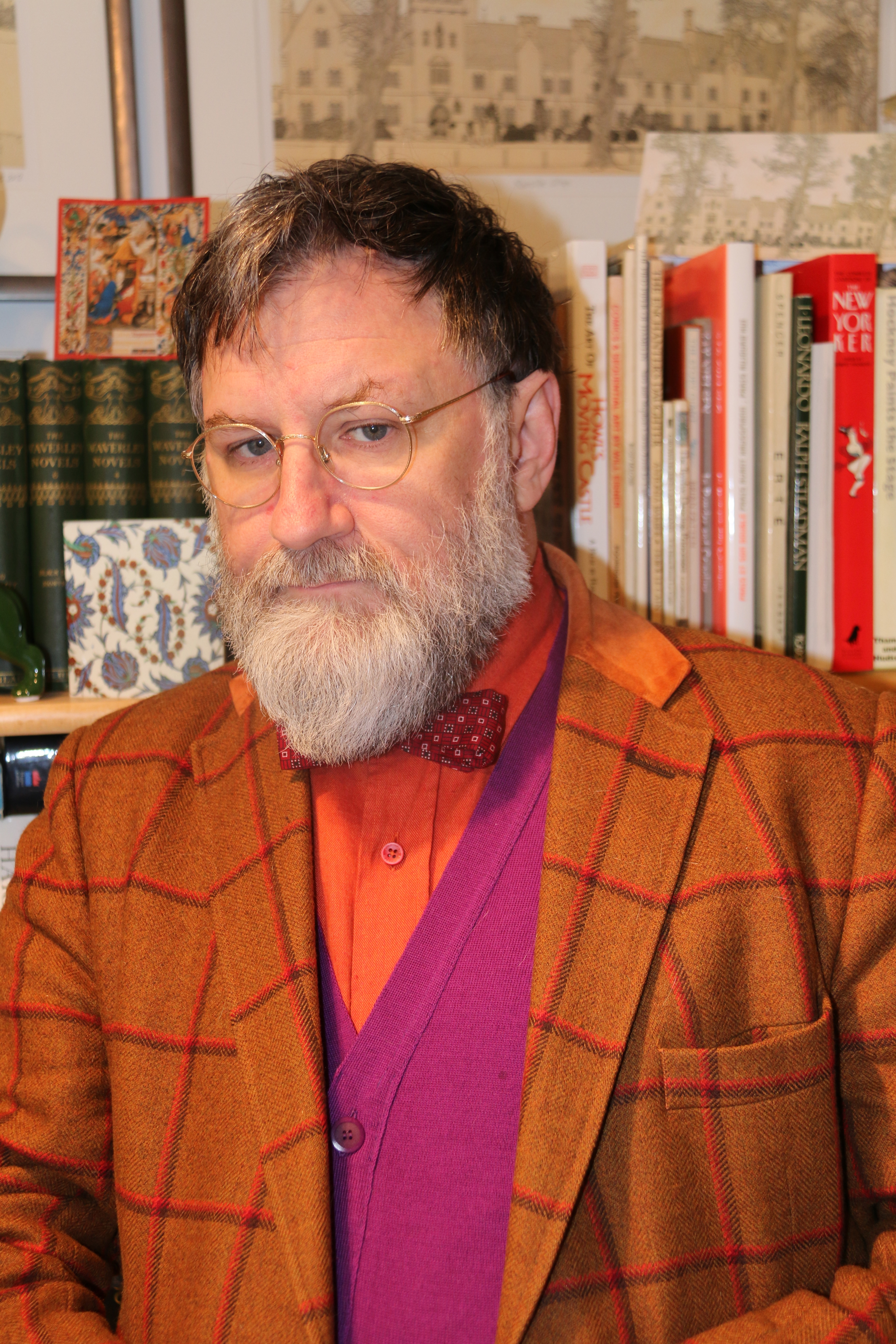
- Wilson in 2015
- Born: 12 May 1961 (age 65); Derby, Derbyshire, England
- Education: Ratcliffe College
- Alma mater: St Benet's Hall, Oxford
- Occupations: Animator; professor; former politician
- Years active: 2015–present
- Political party: UK Independence Party (former member)

Tim Wilson is an English tutor, animator, and YouTube content creator.

He is best known for winning the Viewer's Champion vote and finishing in third place in the second series of the Channel 4 reality television game show series The Circle in 2019. In 2015, he was selected as South Northamptonshire's candidate for the UK Independence Party. Wilson has since said he joined the Party to "expose racism" from the inside, and voted "remain" in the Brexit referendum.

== Early life and education ==
Tim Wilson was born in Derby, Derbyshire, England.

He attended Ratcliffe College, Leicestershire, and then Oxford where he studied Theology in St Benet's Hall under Metropolitan Bishop Kallistos Ware and specialised in inter-faith dialogue, giving lectures in Birmingham.

== Theatre design ==
Wilson was a theatre designer, providing an "American Gothic" design for the first London revival of Stephen Sondheim's Assassins, directed by Sam Buntrock in 1997.

== Politics ==
Wilson was selected as UKIP's candidate for South Northamptonshire at the 2015 general election. However, he resigned from UKIP on 24 March of that year in support of Humza Yousaf, who said he was upset when David Coburn, the only UKIP MEP in Scotland, allegedly referred to Yousaf as the terrorist Abu Hamza. In his resignation letter, Wilson stated that he believed Nigel Farage, the leader of UKIP had shown poor judgement in dismissing Coburn's alleged remarks as a "a joke in very poor taste. He would not be taking any action against him". Wilson later made the point that a joke should be funny and that linking Humza Yousaf to convicted terrorist Abu Hamza was not funny. Wilson was reported saying, "If Mr Coburn wants to make bad jokes about religion, then he is welcome to quit and join Monty Python". "You can't toss this thing off as a joke with a pint of beer. It's unacceptable." As an animator, Wilson had made films for the UKIP campaign; the party's apparent response was to accuse Wilson of not being interested in local affairs, a claim he denied in the Daventry Express, and by standing for election as a local councillor.

While taking part in The Circle, Wilson claimed he actually voted to Remain and wished to "expose UKIP from the inside".

== Television ==
In September 2019, Wilson began appearing as a contestant in the second series of the Channel 4 reality series The Circle. He was a finalist, placed joint third in the series. He also won the shows "Viewers' Champion" title for being the most popular finalist by viewer's vote, winning a £30,000 prize. Since leaving the show, Wilson has been vocal in calling on the British Government for change in the way reality television programmes are made.

== Academia ==
In 2016, Wilson became a professor in the Moscow State Pedagogical University, where he had previously lectured.

== Other activities ==
He has travelled in Albania, Turkey, and Greece, drawing the views that Edward Lear first drew in 1848. His work is recorded in the Albanian Encyclopedia of Art.

== Awards ==
In 2012, Wilson won Best Animation at the Reed.co.uk Short Film Competition for How to be Boss.

== Personal life ==
In September 2021, Tim Wilson was diagnosed with cancer.
