= Saffron Barker =

English YouTuber and influencer (born 2000)

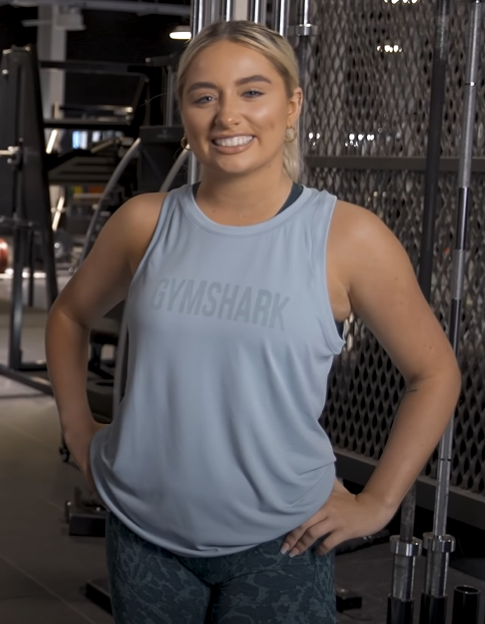
- Barker in 2021
- Born: Saffron Autumn Barker; 24 July 2000 (age 26); Brighton, East Sussex, England
- Occupations: Media personality; podcast host; influencer; author
- Years active: 2015–present

YouTube information
- Channels: Saffron Barker; Saffron Barker Vlogs
- Subscribers: 2.42 million (main); 1.03 million (vlogs)
- Views: 499 million (main); 206 million (vlogs)
- Last updated: 16 January 2026

Saffron Autumn Barker (born 24 July 2000) is an English influencer, YouTuber and podcast host. She is best known for her time on the seventeenth series of Strictly Come Dancing, the fifth series of Celebrity Hunted, and as a runner-up on The Celebrity Circle. In September 2019, The Sunday Times named Barker as their top female influencer.

== Early life ==
Saffron was born in Brighton, East Sussex, on 24 July 2000, to Darren and Wendy Barker. She has two biological brothers, Jed and Casey, and a foster brother, Jordan. She attended Longhill High School in Rottingdean.

== Career ==
=== 2015–2016: Career beginnings ===
Barker was a member of four-piece girl band Born2Blush with bandmates Libby Whitehouse, Jazmine Tiley and Georgia McNamara. The group disbanded when she was 15-years-old, which saw her "left devastated", but it ultimately led to her opening a YouTube channel. Barker subsequently opened her self-titled YouTube account on 30 July 2015, where she still continues to create content about lifestyle and beauty, fashion and fitness. On 27 October 2015, she opened a side channel, solely dedicated to video blogging. Barker has over 2 million subscribers on her main channel.

=== 2017–2018: Kids' Choice Awards, digital series and YouTube Rewind ===
In March 2017, Saffron represented the United Kingdom in Nickelodeon's first-ever 'Social Squad of Influencers' at the 2017 Kids' Choice Awards in Los Angeles, California. In April, Barker and her family presented an original and exclusive six-episode series titled In My Day for television and video on demand service TalkTalk TV. On 6 December 2017, she featured in YouTube's annual YouTube Rewind video. One year later, on 9 March 2018, she was named Nickelodeon's UK representative of their KCA PrankStars, a collective of digital influencers chosen to partake in a prank war at the 2018 Kids' Choice Awards in Inglewood, California.

=== 2019–present: Rise to fame in mainstream media ===
On 1 August 2019, in an interview with Heart Radio, Saffron confirmed that she would be appearing as a contestant on the seventeenth series of BBC dance contest Strictly Come Dancing. She marked the second social media personality to take part in the competition's history after Joe Sugg. Barker's dance partner was Britain's Got Talent series seven contestant, AJ Pritchard. They were eliminated ten weeks in to the competition, on 24 November 2019, after facing Karim Zeroual and Amy Dowden in the dance-off.

In March 2020, Barker appeared on a one-off special edition of The Greatest Dancer for Sport Relief 2020, as a member of dance troupe Don8. Her team won against Team Encore. Nine months later, in December, Barker was announced as one of the 12 contestants to appear on The Celebrity Circle. It aired in March 2021, and saw Barker play as a single version of herself, instead of catfishing as someone else. She was named the runner-up, as Lady Leshurr won the show after catfishing as British rapper Big Narstie.

In January 2022, Barker appeared as a contestant an episode of BBC One's The Wheel, hosted by Michael McIntyre. One month later, in February, she appeared as a contestant on E4's The Real Dirty Dancing, a talent show hosted by Keith Lemon and Ashley Roberts, where ten celebrities paired up in couples to learn dance routines from Dirty Dancing. Barker's dance partner was Lee Ryan, and they were named the winners of the competition.

In March 2023, Barker appeared in the fifth series of Channel 4's Celebrity Hunted, where she was paired up with former University Challenge contestant and mathematician Bobby Seagull. Barker and Seagull had 48 hours left before reaching the extraction point, but decided to split up. Barker ended up being caught by the Hunters after a member of the public told them her exact whereabouts.

== Other media and projects ==
=== Clothing and homeware ranges ===
In October 2017, Barker launched a homeware, stationery, and loungewear range with Irish fashion retailer Primark. In May 2020, she launched a loungewear range with In The Style.

=== Podcasts ===
In November 2020, Saffron tried her hand at podcast hosting for the first time, in a weekly podcast which she co-hosted with her mother, Wendy Barker, titled "Mum Made Me Do It". It was created and published by Global Player and ran for a total of eight months, with the final episode being broadcast on 28 May 2021. Barker made her return to podcasting in October 2022, when she started hosting a new Spotify original podcast, titled "Sex, Lies & DM Slides" with her close friend Anastasia Kingsnorth, where they discuss "the cringey, the cute and the outright awkward".

== Philanthropy and charity work ==
In April 2019, Saffron ran the 2019 London Marathon with her friend and personal trainer, Ross Scrivener, to fundraise for Alzheimer's Research UK and Alzheimer's Society's 'Dementia Revolution' campaign in memory of her great-grandfather, who died of Alzheimer's disease when she was 11 years old.

During the coronavirus pandemic in April 2020, Barker launched the #YouTube4NHSHeroes charity project, where she donated all of her monthly advertising revenue from her weekly videos directly to the NHS' "Charities Together COVID-10" appeal. She encouraged other content creators to do the same by uploading a video of their choice and also pledging their ad revenue to the cause for a 'Super Saturday' fundraising event, in hopes that viewers would watch the videos and advertisements to boost the donated amount. In the same month, Barker was one of the many UK-based social media personalities to present the four-hour long "#WithMe" YouTube livestream, discussing tips on 'how to stay upbeat through lockdown', whilst raising money for the NHS Charities Together partnership. She was joined virtually by AJ Pritchard and Curtis Pritchard.

In September 2020, Barker supported the Digital Detox Day campaign which encouraged internet users to take time off social media for 24 hours. It was held on Saturday, 5 September 2020. In November 2020, she surprised a 16-year-old autistic young carer from the Isle of Sheppey, who suffers with OCD and severe anxiety, with a National Lottery Award via video message.

== Personal life ==
Barker resides in Brighton, East Sussex and previously lived in Woodingdean with her family. She did not attend college, as she wanted to pursue her YouTube career instead.

She was in a relationship with rugby player Louis Rees-Zammit, which ended in 2024.
