= Raf Vilar =

- Birth name: Rafael Vieira Vilar
- Born: Rio de Janeiro, Brazil
- Genres: Neofolk; World Music; MPB
- Occupations: Musician; Journalist; Record producer
- Instruments: Vocals; Guitar; Piano; Percussion
- Labels: Far Out Records; Ajabú!

Rafael Vieira Vilar known by his stage name Raf Vilar, is a Brazilian singer and songwriter based in London.

== Early life ==
Vilar was born and raised in Rio de Janeiro and began studying music at the age of 13. After graduating in journalism at age 22, Vilar moved to London.

== Career ==
In 2011, Vilar released his debut album Studies in Bossa on Far Out Recordings, a British label that specialises in bringing Brazilian music to Europe. The album featured on the World Music charts in Japan and opened the door for Vilar to perform in venues such as The Shrine Harlem in New York, Somerset House and Ronnie Scotts in London. He has recorded a session at BBC Maida Vale Studios and released Studies in Bossa Deluxe in 2013.

== Discography ==
2011 – Studies in Bossa (Far Out Recordings)

2013 – Studies in Bossa Deluxe (Far Out Recordings)

2015 – High Class Cat (Far Out Recordings)

2022 – Clichê (Ajabú!)
