= The Circle (British TV series) series 2 =

Second series of The Circle

The Circle
- Series 2
- Presented by: Emma Willis
- No. of days: 27
- No. of contestants: 15
- Winner: Paddy Smyth
- Runner-up: Georgina Elliott
- Other finalists: James Doran; Tim Wilson; Woody Cook
- No. of episodes: 22

Release
- Original network: Channel 4
- Original release: 24 September – 18 October 2019

Additional information
- Filming dates: 22 September – 18 October 2019

Series chronology
- ← Previous; Series 1 Next → Series 3

The second series of The Circle began on 24 September 2019 on Channel 4, with a live special hosted by Emma Willis, and concluded on 18 October 2019 after 22 episodes. The series was confirmed on 18 January 2019. Sophie Willan returned as narrator for the second season. The series launched with 1,975,000 viewers. It concluded with 1,209,000 viewers, which was a +67% increase on the first season's final number of viewers, and attracted the biggest share of 16-34 year old viewers from 10 to 11:35 p.m.

On 24 September 2019, it was announced that Richard Madeley would be taking part in the series as a special guest, and would be entering during the live launch. Viewers were then tasked with picking which persona he would be playing, ultimately choosing him to play as "Judy", a 27-year-old woman. He left the series during the seventh episode after successfully completing his mission to be blocked.

On 18 October 2019, the series was won by Paddy Smyth, who had played the game as himself. He won £70,000 of the total prize fund, with the remaining £30,000 going to Tim Wilson who won the "viewers champion" vote. Georgina Elliott was the runner-up of the series.

== Format changes ==
This series was the first to include weekly live episodes, which are hosted by Emma Willis and airs instead of the regular episode on Fridays. Although it still features daily highlights, it also includes interviews with blocked players and celebrity guests dissecting the week's events. Emma also confirmed on the launch show that the prize fund had been increased this year taking it to £100,000, doubling the amount from the first series. The £100,000 would be split, with £70,000 going to the highest rated player and £30,000 going to the viewers' favourite finalist. Unlike the previous series, instead of the players rating each other out of 5 during each round, they are given the task of ranking each other from most to least favourite instead.

== Players ==
The contestants taking part in the series were revealed on 23 September 2019.

Name	Age	Hometown	Playing as		Entered	Exited	Status
Emelle Smith	31	Manchester	Herself, but straight and younger (24)		Episode 1	Episode 2	Blocked
Sy Jennings	35	Somerset	Himself		Episode 1	Episode 4	Blocked
Richard Madeley (Note: Richard was a guest and was therefore not eligible to win.)	63	London	"Judy", a 27-year-old nutritionist		Episode 2	Episode 7	Blocked
Katie Carr	43	Hampshire	Jay, her 25-year-old son		Episode 1	Episode 9	Blocked
Brooke Derosiers	24	Buckinghamshire	Herself		Episode 1	Episode 15	Blocked
Beth Dunlavey (Note: Decided by the viewers, Beth and Jack joined forces during Episode 11 to become "Joyce", a 62-year-old woman)	29	Newcastle	Herself, but younger (26) and using another woman's photos	"Joyce", a 62-year-old widow	Episode 8	Episode 18	Blocked
Jack Quirk	29	Edinburgh	Himself	"Joyce", a 62-year-old widow	Episode 8	Episode 18	Blocked
Busayo Twins	24	London	"Josh", a 24-year-old white man		Episode 14	Episode 19	Blocked
Jan Jones	58	Kent	Herself		Episode 16	Episode 20	Blocked
Ella May	24	London	Herself		Episode 4	Episode 21	Blocked
Woody Cook	18	Brighton	Himself, but not revealing his famous parents (Zoe Ball & Norman Cook)		Episode 1	Episode 22	Fifth place
James Doran	26	Liverpool	"Sammie", a 26-year-old single mother		Episode 1	Episode 22	Third place
Tim Wilson	58	Rugby	Himself		Episode 1	Episode 22	Third place
Georgina Elliott	21	Nottingham	Herself		Episode 1	Episode 22	Runner-up
Paddy Smyth	31	Dublin	Himself, but not revealing his cerebral palsy until later		Episode 10	Episode 22	Winner

=== Twists ===
==== Richard Madeley – "Judy" ====
Ahead of the launch, it was announced that television presenter Richard Madeley would be entering The Circle, with the viewers deciding which persona he would be playing. They chose for him to play as "Judy", a 27-year old woman. In Episode 5, Richard was tasked with becoming the most unpopular player and getting blocked at the next ratings. He successfully completed this task and, as a reward, was allowed to give one player immunity in the next ratings. He gave this to Georgina.

==== The Public – Ella and Kevin ====
During episode 4, the public were given the choice to vote for a new player to be added into The Circle. The viewers had the choice between Ella, 24, or Kevin, 23, to join the game as themselves. After the vote, it was revealed that Ella had won, and joined The Circle.

==== "Joyce" ====
Beth Dunlavey and Jack Quirk, who both joined The Circle as separate players in Episode 8, were the next twist decided by the public. After being blocked during Episode 11, having received the two lowest average ratings, they were then informed that the viewers had been voting for whether they should be blocked for good and be replaced by a brand new player, Ryan, playing secretly with his girlfriend, Lauren, or to continue in the game together, but join forces to play as one persona ("Joyce", a 62-year-old woman). The viewers voted for Beth and Jack to continue in the game as a team, and "Joyce" officially joined The Circle in Episode 12.

==== The Eggs – Andrea and Jan ====
During Episode 16, Andrea and Jan entered The Circle as anonymous players represented by coloured eggs. Andrea ("Red Egg") and Jan ("Blue Egg") had to participate in various tasks so the other players could vote for which of the two they would like to see join The Circle. Tim and Ella voted for "Red Egg", whilst Beth and Jack ("Joyce"), Busayo, Georgina, James, Paddy, and Woody voted for "Blue Egg". After the votes were tallied, the identities of the eggs were revealed. Having received the majority vote, Jan was introduced into The Circle; Andrea was immediately blocked, leaving the show just a few hours after arriving. Jan became the last player to enter The Circle.

== Results and elimination ==
Unlike the previous series, players ranked each other from most to least favourite in order to determine the average ratings results.

Colour key
The contestant was blocked.
The contestant was an influencer.
The contestant was immune from being blocked.
The contestant was blocked, but returned as a different contestant.

		Episode 2	Episode 4	Episode 6	Episode 8	Episode 10	Episode 14	Episode 17	Episode 19	Episode 21	Episode 22 Final	
Paddy		Not in The Circle				Exempt	=5th	No ratings	6th	=4th	1st	Winner (Episode 22)
Georgina		=7th	=4th	1st	5th	5th	=5th	No ratings	=4th	2nd	2nd	Runner-up (Episode 22)
James "Sammie"		1st	2nd	4th	6th	6th	4th	No ratings	1st	3rd	=3rd	Third place (Episode 22)
Tim		2nd	1st	2nd	2nd	3rd	1st	No ratings	2nd	1st	=3rd	Third place (Episode 22)
Woody		=5th	7th	3rd	3rd	1st	3rd	No ratings	=4th	=4th	5th	Fifth place (Episode 22)
Ella		Not in The Circle		Exempt	1st	2nd	2nd	No ratings	3rd	=4th	Blocked (Episode 21)	
Jan		Not in The Circle						No ratings	7th	Blocked (Episode 20)		
Busayo "Josh"		Not in The Circle					Exempt	No ratings	8th	Blocked (Episode 19)		
Beth	"Joyce"	Not in The Circle			Exempt	8th	8th	No ratings	Blocked (Episode 18)			
Jack	"Joyce"	Not in The Circle			Exempt	7th	8th	No ratings	Blocked (Episode 18)			
Brooke		=7th	=4th	5th	7th	4th	7th	Blocked (Episode 15)				
Katie "Jay"		=5th	3rd	6th	4th	Blocked (Episode 9)						
Richard "Judy"		Not in The Circle	Exempt	7th	Blocked (Episode 7)							
Sy		=3rd	6th	Blocked (Episode 4)								
Emelle		=3rd	Blocked (Episode 2)									
Notes		none		1	2	3	4	5	6	7	none	
Influencers		James, Tim	James, Tim	Georgina, Tim	Ella, Tim	Ella, Woody	Ella, Tim	Woody	James, Tim	Georgina, Tim	none	
Blocked		Emelle; Influencers' choice to block	Sy; Influencers' choice to block	Richard "Judy"; Influencers' choice to block	Katie "Jay"; Influencers' choice to block	Beth; Lowest rated player	Brooke; Influencers' choice to block	Beth & Jack "Joyce"; Secret; Influencer's choice to block	Busayo "Josh"; Lowest rated player	Ella; Influencers' choice to block	Woody; Lowest rated player	Tim; Third highest rated player
Blocked		Emelle; Influencers' choice to block	Sy; Influencers' choice to block	Richard "Judy"; Influencers' choice to block	Katie "Jay"; Influencers' choice to block	Beth; Lowest rated player	Brooke; Influencers' choice to block	Beth & Jack "Joyce"; Secret; Influencer's choice to block	Busayo "Josh"; Lowest rated player	Ella; Influencers' choice to block	James "Sammie"; Third highest rated player	Georgina; Second highest rated player
Blocked		Emelle; Influencers' choice to block	Sy; Influencers' choice to block	Richard "Judy"; Influencers' choice to block	Katie "Jay"; Influencers' choice to block	Jack; Second lowest rated player	Brooke; Influencers' choice to block	Beth & Jack "Joyce"; Secret; Influencer's choice to block	Jan; Influencers' choice to block	Ella; Influencers' choice to block	James "Sammie"; Third highest rated player	Georgina; Second highest rated player
Blocked		Emelle; Influencers' choice to block	Sy; Influencers' choice to block	Richard "Judy"; Influencers' choice to block	Katie "Jay"; Influencers' choice to block	Jack; Second lowest rated player	Brooke; Influencers' choice to block	Beth & Jack "Joyce"; Secret; Influencer's choice to block	Jan; Influencers' choice to block	Ella; Influencers' choice to block	Paddy; Highest rated player	

=== Notes ===
- ^Note 1 : In Episode 6, due to being a guest, Richard was not allowed to rate but was eligible to be rated by the other players.
- ^Note 2 : After passing his task to be blocked, Richard was able to give immunity to a player of his choice during the next round. He chose Georgina.
- ^Note 3 : This round the influencers did not have the power to block. Instead, the two players with the lowest ratings were automatically blocked. However, the viewers had to then decide whether to save the two eliminated players, Beth and Jack, and have them secretly return as a team (playing as "Joyce", a catfish), or if new players Lauren and Ryan should enter the game as a team, playing as "Ryan". The viewers chose to save both Beth and Jack, who joined together as "Joyce".
- ^Note 4 : Before the Deliberation, both Influencers were told to independently save a player. Tim (as the higher-rated influencer) went first and saved Woody. Ella then saved "Sammie"/James.
- ^Note 5 : This round, there were no ratings. Instead, the viewers voted for one player to become a "secret influencer", whose identity was not revealed to the other players. That secret influencer had to block a fellow player face-to-face. As a new player, Jan was not eligible to become the secret influencer or to be blocked by them.
- ^Note 6 : In Episode 19, the lowest-rated player, Busayo, was immediately blocked from The Circle. Then the new Influencers went to the Hangout and blocked another player, which was Jan.
- ^Note 7 : Before the Deliberation, both influencers were told to independently save a player. Tim, as the higher-rated influencer, went first and saved Woody. Georgina then saved James.
