= The Celebrity Circle =

Celebrity edition of The Circle

- Presented by: Emma Willis
- No. of contestants: 12
- Winner: Lady Leshurr as "Big Narstie"
- Runner-up: Saffron Barker
- No. of episodes: 6

Release
- Original network: Channel 4
- Original release: 9 March – 15 March 2021

The Celebrity Circle for Stand Up to Cancer, a spin-off of The Circle, began on 9 March 2021 on Channel 4, and concluded following six episodes on 15 March. The series was confirmed in June 2020, and was filmed during Autumn 2020 in its usual location in Salford, England. Unlike the regular series, the celebrity players, if they decided to play as a catfish, were limited to playing as other celebrities.

On 15 March 2021, the series was won by Lady Leshurr, who had played the game catfishing as Big Narstie. She beat Saffron Barker in the final ratings, who finished as runner-up.

== Format changes ==
Unlike previous series, Emma Willis delivered video messages to the players during the game informing them on upcoming twists. Ahead of the first blocking, the influencers had to decide which two players to put at risk, before ultimately deciding which one of them to block. For the second round, Willis announced that the three players which occupy "The Triangle" would be the players at risk of being blocked.

== Players ==
The celebrities taking part in the series were revealed on 15 December 2020. In a slight difference in The Circle format, should they decide to catfish, the celebrity players must impersonate another famous figure.

Celebrity	Known for	Playing as	Entered	Exited	Status
Duncan James	Blue singer & Hollyoaks actor	Himself, but single	Episode 1	Episode 2	Blocked
Kaye Adams	Loose Women presenter & BBC Radio Scotland presenter	Gemma Collins	Episode 1	Episode 4	Blocked
Nadia Sawalha	Former EastEnders actress & Loose Women panellist	Gemma Collins	Episode 1	Episode 4	Blocked
Charlotte Crosby	Former Geordie Shore star	Peter Andre	Episode 3	Episode 6	Blocked
Baga Chipz	Drag queen & RuPaul's Drag Race UK finalist	Kim Woodburn	Episode 1	Episode 6	Blocked
Melvin Odoom	Television & radio presenting duo	will.i.am	Episode 1	Episode 6	Fifth place
Rickie Haywood-Williams	Television & radio presenting duo	will.i.am	Episode 1	Episode 6	Fifth place
Pete Wicks	The Only Way Is Essex star	Rachel Riley	Episode 1	Episode 6	Third place
Sam Thompson	Made in Chelsea star	Rachel Riley	Episode 1	Episode 6	Third place
Denise van Outen	Actress, singer & presenter	Herself	Episode 1	Episode 6	Third place
Saffron Barker	YouTube personality	Herself, but single	Episode 1	Episode 6	Runner-up
Lady Leshurr	Rapper	Big Narstie	Episode 1	Episode 6	Winner

== Results and elimination ==
Colour key
The contestant was blocked.
The contestant was an influencer.
The contestant was at risk of being blocked following a twist.

	Episode 2	Episode 4	Episode 5	Episode 6	
Lady Leshurr "Big Narstie"	2nd	Saffron to block	6th	1st	Winner (Episode 6)
Saffron	1st	Not eligible to vote	4th	2nd	Runner-up (Episode 6)
Denise	8th	Kaye & Nadia to block	2nd	=3rd	Third place (Episode 6)
Pete & Sam "Rachel"	=5th	Kaye & Nadia to block	1st	=3rd	Third place (Episode 6)
Melvin & Rickie "will.i.am"	3rd	Kaye & Nadia to block	7th	5th	Fifth place (Episode 6)
Baga "Kim"	4th	Not eligible to vote	3rd	Blocked (Episode 6)	
Charlotte "Peter"	Not in The Circle	Kaye & Nadia to block	5th	Blocked (Episode 6)	
Kaye & Nadia "Gemma"	=5th	Not eligible to vote	Blocked (Episode 4)		
Duncan	=5th	Blocked (Episode 2)			
Notes	none	1	none		
Influencers	Lady Leshurr, Saffron	none	Denise, Pete & Sam	none	
Blocked	Duncan; Influencers' choice to block	Kaye & Nadia "Gemma"; 4 of 5 votes to block	Baga "Kim"; Influencers' choice to block	Rickie & Melvin "will.i.am" Lowest rated player	Denise; Third highest rated player
Blocked	Duncan; Influencers' choice to block	Kaye & Nadia "Gemma"; 4 of 5 votes to block	Baga "Kim"; Influencers' choice to block	Pete & Sam "Rachel"; Third highest rated player	Saffron; Second highest rated player
Blocked	Duncan; Influencers' choice to block	Kaye & Nadia "Gemma"; 4 of 5 votes to block	Charlotte "Peter"; Influencers' choice to block	Pete & Sam "Rachel"; Third highest rated player	Saffron; Second highest rated player
Blocked	Duncan; Influencers' choice to block	Kaye & Nadia "Gemma"; 4 of 5 votes to block	Charlotte "Peter"; Influencers' choice to block	Lady Leshurr "Big Narstie"; Highest rated player	

=== Notes ===
- ^Note 1 : Unbeknownst to Charlotte, the three players she picked to leave a party, Baga, Kaye & Nadia, and Lady Leshurr, actually were at risk of being blocked. After winning a challenge, Lady Leshurr managed to escape being blocked and was able to choose Saffron to replace her. It was then up to the remaining players to come to a unanimous decision on who to block. As players couldn't come to a unanimous decision, the player with the majority of votes was blocked instead.

== Viewing figures ==
Episode	Airdate	Rating (7-day consolidated)
1	9 March 2021	1.80m
2	10 March 2021	1.54m
3	11 March 2021	1.55m
4	12 March 2021	1.83m
5	14 March 2021	1.36m
6	15 March 2021	1.29m
