= Emma Willis =

English television presenter and former model (born 1976)

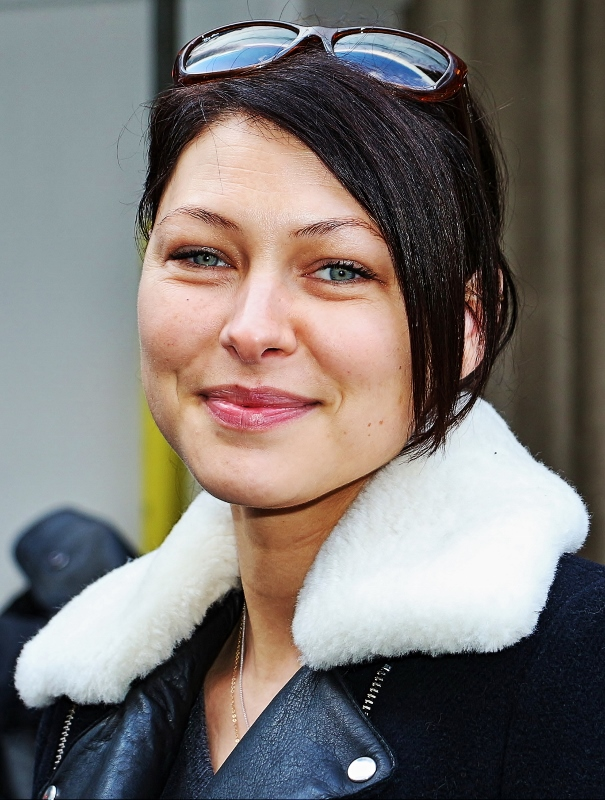
- Willis in 2014
- Born: Emma Louise Griffiths; 18 March 1976 (age 50); Birmingham, England
- Occupation: Broadcaster
- Years active: 2002–present
- Spouse: Matt Willis (m. 2008)
- Children: 3

Emma Louise Willis (née Griffiths; born 18 March 1976) is an English broadcaster. She is known for her television and radio work with Channel 5, BBC, ITV and Heart FM.

Willis presented the Channel 5 reality shows Big Brother and Celebrity Big Brother (2013–2018), as well as the spin-off show Big Brother's Bit on the Side (2011–2015). She presented the BBC One and ITV1 talent competition show The Voice (2014–present), and the children's spin-off The Voice Kids (2017–2023). In 2019 and 2021, Willis presented the second and third series of the reality show The Circle on Channel 4. In 2024, she became a co-host of the Netflix dating show Love Is Blind alongside her husband Matt Willis. Since 2026, she has co-presented the BBC dance competition Strictly Come Dancing.

== Early life ==
Emma Willis was born in Sutton Coldfield, Birmingham, attending Wylde Green Primary School and then John Willmott School in Sutton Coldfield. She began modelling at the age of 15, and during her career worked for a range of magazines, retailers and companies including Marie Claire, Elle, Vogue, GAP and Chanel.

== Career ==
Willis began presenting on MTV in 2002 before presenting various other programmes, including guest-hosting shows such as CD:UK, This Morning and Loose Women.

=== ITV ===
In 2007, Willis presented ITV2 spin-off series I'm a Celebrity...Get Me Out of Here! NOW! with her husband Matt before departing in 2008. She presented numerous episodes of The Hot Desk on ITV2 between 2008 and 2014. In September 2012, Willis became a permanent presenter on This Morning, presenting segments in The Hub, taking over from Coleen Nolan. The feature was axed in 2014. She was also a stand-in presenter on the main show when Holly Willoughby or Ruth Langsford were absent and returned to guest present the show with Rylan Clark-Neal in 2018. Willis hosted two series of the ITV2 reality show Girlfriends in 2012 and 2013.

On 16 November 2012, Willis was a guest anchor Loose Women and has since presented on several occasions as a stand-in presenter. In November 2013, Willis guest presented an episode of The Paul O'Grady Show while O'Grady was away.

In June 2013, Willis co-presented the ITV game show Prize Island with Alexander Armstrong. In February 2015, Willis was a team captain on the six-part ITV2 comedy panel show Reality Bites, hosted by Stephen Mulhern. On 2 July 2015, it was announced that Willis would present a new three-part series for ITV called What Would Be Your Miracle, about modern miracles. The series began on 28 April 2016. In January 2017, The Voice UK moved from BBC One to ITV. It was confirmed on 9 June 2016 that Willis would present the series after co-hosting three previous series on the BBC. She also presented two series of The Voice Kids on ITV since 2017. In January 2017, she presented The BRITs Are Coming live on ITV. She co-presented the 2017 BRIT Awards in February alongside Dermot O'Leary. She hosted The BRITs Are Coming for a second year in January 2018. Agreed in August 2017, she presented Your Song in October 2017, a one-off special for ITV.

On 3 March 2018, Willis made a surprise appearance on Ant & Dec's Saturday Night Takeaway, as she presented Win the Ads while the main hosts playing the game as part of the show's 100th episode.

=== Channel 4 ===
In 2007, Willis guest hosted the tenth week of Big Brother's Big Mouth. In 2010, Willis began presenting a Celebrity Big Brother online spin-off show entitled Celebrity Big Brother's Bit on The Side. While presenting the online spin-off in the same series, Willis also presented another edition of Big Mouth when Davina McCall entered the Big Brother house as part of a task. She was then later announced in August as the new co-presenter on the final series of Big Brother's Little Brother, hosting opposite George Lamb.

In June 2019, Willis replaced Alice Levine and Maya Jama as host of The Circle.

=== Channel 5 ===
In 2010, Willis replaced Melinda Messenger on the Channel 5 series Live from Studio Five, but she left after only two months to co-present Big Brother's Little Brother and was replaced by Jayne Middlemiss. In August 2011, she returned to the revived series, presenting the spin-off show Big Brother's Bit on the Side.

On 13 March 2013, it was reported that Willis would replace Brian Dowling as host of Big Brother. Her appointment as host was confirmed on 2 April 2013. On 13 June 2013, she began presenting the fourteenth series of Big Brother.

As well as presenting the main Big Brother and celebrity series, she continued to host the spin-off show Bit on the Side, sharing the presenting duties with Rylan Clark. On 2 February 2015, it was announced that Willis was to present her final edition of Bit on the Side that night, and Clark would take over as the main presenter of the spin off show.

Willis interrogated Winston McKenzie during his exit interview on Celebrity Big Brother over his controversial opinions. Willis has expressed personal pride on this moment in her career.

On 30 March 2014, Willis presented the Mum of the Year Awards, with the highlights being shown on Channel 5 that same evening.

=== BBC ===
In September 2013, Willis was confirmed as the replacement for Holly Willoughby on the BBC One talent show The Voice UK. On 11 January 2014, she began co-presenting the third series with JLS singer Marvin Humes, who replaced Reggie Yates.

In March 2014, it was announced that The Voice UK had been renewed for two future series. Both Willis and Humes returned to the show for the fourth series in 2015 and fifth series in 2016. In 2017, the show moved to ITV.

Willis and Reggie Yates co-hosted the Saturday night game show Prized Apart on BBC One. The series began on 13 June 2015 and was axed after the first series, due to poor ratings.

In May 2026, it was announced that Willis would become one of the new hosts of Strictly Come Dancing alongside Josh Widdicombe and Johannes Radebe replacing long-standing presenters Tess Daly and Claudia Winkleman.

=== Radio ===
On 5 August 2012, Willis began co-presenting Sunday Morning Breakfast with Stephen Mulhern across the Heart network. The Show ended in 2018. It was announced in December 2025 that Willis would present a new BBC Radio 2 show beginning in January 2026. The show would run from 1–3pm on Saturdays.

=== Other work ===
In October 2015, she became the celebrity ambassador for Gillette Venus and Oral-B.

On 21 March 2023, Willis partnered with Absolute Collagen for their 'Strong in your own skin' campaign.

== Awards and nominations ==
Year	Category	Nominated for	Result	Ref.
2012	National Reality TV Awards	Best TV Presenter	Nominated	
2013	National TV Awards	Entertainment Presenter	Longlisted	
2014	National TV Awards	Entertainment Presenter	Longlisted	
2014	Glamour Awards	Best TV Presenter	Won	
2014	Freesat TV Free Awards	Best TV Presenter	Nominated	
2014	Digital Spy Awards	Best TV Presenter	Nominated	
2015	National TV Awards	Entertainment Presenter	Longlisted	
2016	Digital Spy Awards	Best TV Presenter	Nominated	
2017	National TV Awards	TV Presenter	Longlisted	
2017	Glamour Awards	TV Personality	Won	
2018	National Reality TV Awards	Best TV Presenter	Nominated	
2018	Champion of Women Award	Style and Spirit	Won	
2018	I Talk Telly Awards	Best TV Presenter	Nominated	
2018	Digital Spy Awards	Best TV Presenter	Nominated	
2019	National TV Awards	Entertainment Presenter	Longlisted	
2019	I Talk Telly Awards	Best TV Presenter	Nominated	
2019	Heat Unmissable Awards	TV & Radio Presenter	Won	
2020	National TV Awards	TV Presenter	Longlisted	
2020	I Talk Telly Awards	Best TV Presenter	Nominated	
2022	National TV Awards	TV Presenter	Longlisted	
2023	National TV Awards	TV Presenter	Longlisted	

== Personal life ==
On 5 July 2008, Emma Griffiths married Busted member Matt Willis at Rushton Hall, Northamptonshire, after three years of dating. The wedding was featured in OK magazine. She gave birth to their first child, a daughter named Isabelle, on 20 June 2009. On 25 November 2011, the couple had a second child, a son named Ace. On 4 May 2016, Willis gave birth to their third child, a second daughter, named Trixie Grace.

In an episode of Who Do You Think You Are?, Willis confirmed that she has longstanding roots in Birmingham, with her family tree being traced back to her great-great-great-grandfather, who was named James Gretton and was listed as a Horn and Hair Merchant in the census records. She also found she had Irish ancestors, a fact that came as a surprise to her. The revelations about her ancestry left her extremely uncomfortable with the actions of one, who she discovered was a violent Orangeman, but overall, she was happy to have found a connection to her more broad Irish heritage.

Willis is a supporter of Aston Villa.

In August 2019, Willis obtained a qualification as a maternity care assistant following her experience on the W series Delivering Babies.

During the COVID-19 pandemic in March 2021, Willis and her husband completed training with St John Ambulance to act as vaccination volunteers.

In May 2023, Willis was featured in the documentary, Matt Willis: Fighting Addiction. The documentary, which aired on the BBC on 17 May 2023, followed Willis and her husband as they spoke about the latter's addiction issues.

In 2025, Willis underwent keyhole heart surgery after medical investigations revealed that she had a congenital hole in her heart which she had been unaware of for 48 years. The condition was discovered following routine checks and further investigation after an MRI scan identified an enlargement in her heart. Willis underwent the procedure at the Royal Brompton Hospital and later publicly thanked the medical staff who treated her.

== Filmography ==
Television
Year	Title	Role	Notes
2002–2003	MTV	Presenter	
2003–2005	Total Request Live	Presenter	
2005, 2007, 2010	Big Brother's Big Mouth	Guest presenter	
2007–2008	I'm a Celebrity...Get Me Out of Here! NOW!	Co-presenter	2 series
2008–2014	The Hot Desk	Presenter	Various episodes
2008	Red Bull Flugtag	Co-presenter	
2008	27 Dresses: Movie Special	Presenter	
2010	Live from Studio Five	Co-presenter	
2010	The Real Hustle	Herself	
2010	Big Brother's Little Brother	Co-presenter	1 series
2011–2015	Celebrity Big Brother's Bit on the Side	Co-presenter	8 series
2011–2014	Big Brother's Bit on the Side	Co-presenter	4 series
2012–2014, 2018	This Morning	"Hub" presenter	Regular
2012–2014, 2018, 2023–present	This Morning	Stand-in presenter	11 episodes
2012–2013, 2021	Loose Women	Anchor	8 episodes
2012–2013	Girlfriends	Presenter	2 series
2013	Speidi: Scandal, Secrets & Surgery!	Narrator	One-off episode
2013	Prize Island	Co-presenter	1 series
2013	The Paul O'Grady Show	Guest presenter	1 episode
2013–2018	Big Brother	Presenter	6 series
2013–2018	Celebrity Big Brother	Presenter	11 series
2014–2026	The Voice	Presenter	12 Series
2015	Reality Bites	Team captain	1 series
2015	Prized Apart	Co-presenter	1 series
2016	What Would Be Your Miracle?	Presenter	1 series
2016	BRITs Icon: Robbie Williams	Narrator	One-off episode
2017	BRIT Awards	Co-presenter	37th event
2017–2023	The Voice Kids	Presenter	7 series
2017	Your Song	Presenter	One-off episode
2017–2018	The Keith & Paddy Picture Show	Janine Melnitz/Rizzo	2 episodes
2018–present	Emma Willis: Delivering Babies	Presenter	Documentary series
2019	Comic Relief	Presenter	Telethon
2019	Pants on Fire	Presenter	
2019–2021	The Circle	Presenter	Series 2 – Series 3
2021	The Celebrity Circle	Presenter	Series 1
2021–present	Cooking with the Stars	Co-presenter	Series 1-present
2021	Emma and AJ Get to Work	Co-presenter	Alongside AJ Odudu
2022	The Great Celebrity Bake Off for SU2C	Herself	Series 5; episode 1
2022	The Great Home Transformation	Co-presenter	With Nick Grimshaw
2023, 2024	The World Cook	Co-presenter	With Fred Sirieix
2023	Matt Willis: Fighting Addiction	Herself	BBC documentary
2023	Love Is Blind	Co-presenter	
2024	Team GB's Homecoming by The National Lottery	Co-host	With Vernon Kay
2024	Swiped: The School That Banned Smartphones	Co-presenter	With Matt Willis
2025	Love Is Blind	Co-presenter	
2025	Change Your Mind, Change Your Life	Co-presenter	With Matt Willis
2026	Celebrity Sabotage	Herself	With Matt Willis
2026–present	Strictly Come Dancing	Co-presenter	With Josh Widdicombe and Johannes Radebe

Radio
Year	Station	Show	Role
2012–2018	Heart Network	Sunday mornings	Co-presenter
2026–present	BBC Radio 2	Saturday afternoons, 1–3 o'clock	Presenter
