= The Circle (British TV series) =

British reality show

- Genre: Reality
- Creative director: Tim Harcourt
- Presented by: Maya Jama; Alice Levine; Emma Willis
- Narrated by: Sophie Willan
- Theme music composer: Patrizio Knight
- Opening theme: "The Circle Theme"
- Country of origin: United Kingdom
- Original language: English
- No. of series: 3
- No. of episodes: 61

Production
- Executive producers: Tim Harcout; Daisy Lilly; Toni Ireland; Cam de la Huerta; Martin Oxley
- Camera setup: Fixed rig
- Running time: 60-95 minutes (inc. adverts)
- Production companies: Studio Lambert; Motion Content Group

Original release
- Network: Channel 4
- Release: 18 September 2018 – 9 April 2021

Related
- The Circle franchise

The Circle, sometimes called The Circle UK, (Note: Sometimes the show is called "The Circle UK" to differentiate from other international versions) is a British reality television game show and the original version of The Circle franchise. Produced by Studio Lambert and Motion Content Group and airing on Channel 4.

The series bills itself as a game based around social media, and features contestants who live in different apartments in a complex isolated from the outside world and each other. The players only communicate through a social media platform called "The Circle", as they compete to be deemed the most popular in the group. As they communicate through "The Circle", players can portray themselves as whoever they wish. Throughout the course of the competition, players are "blocked" from "The Circle", until only one remains and wins the cash prize. The show has been compared to Big Brother and Catfish in format, as well as Black Mirror episode "Nosedive" with the concept of having to rate other people.

The show is narrated by Sophie Willan, whilst the first and last episodes of the first series were hosted by Maya Jama and Alice Levine (later replaced by Emma Willis from the second series onwards).

The first series was won by 26-year-old Internet comedian Alex Hobern, who had played the game claiming to be a 25-year-old woman called Kate, using photos of his real-life girlfriend Millie. Hobern also won the "viewers champion" for an additional £25,000, claiming £75,000 in total. The second series was won by Paddy Smyth, with Tim Wilson winning the "viewers champion" vote. In June 2020, The Circle was renewed for a third series. The Celebrity Circle was also announced. The Circle was cancelled by Channel 4 in May 2021. The same month it was reported that Studio Lambert in talks with Netflix to launch the British version of the show on the streaming service.

== Format ==
The show's contestants ("players") all move into a refurbished block of flats. Contestants do not meet face-to-face during the competition, living in individual flats and communicating through messaging devices. Messaging profiles are created as a genuine or altered representation of the player, or as somebody else. Multiple players can play as one profile, sharing an apartment: One profile can be played by multiple players, with a slight differentiation so that messages can be sent to one or the other player .

The players rate each other throughout the game. In series 1, the players rated each other from 1 to 5 stars. At the end of the rating, average scores were revealed. Players after series 1 rank the other players. Eliminations (or "blockings") occur commonly when selected players, commonly the highest rated in a rating, become "influencers". On occasion rules are amended, for example the lowest rating players could be instantly blocked, the influencers' identity has been withheld, or multiple players have been blocked. Blocked players are eliminated from the game and are given an opportunity to briefly meet one player still in the game. Normally, blocked players are replaced by a new player.

During the final, the contestants rate each other one final time, the highest rated player/s wins the series and receives a cash prize. The amount was £50,000 in series 1, £70,000 in series 2 and £100,000 in series 3.

Viewers also have been able to choose a "viewers' champion" from the finalists, who would receive £25,000 in series 1 and £30,000 in series 2. Due to COVID-19 restrictions, the third series was pre-recorded, meaning the viewers' vote could not take place.

== Production ==
=== The Circle app ===
Each apartment that the players live in is plastered with screens in every room in order for the players to be able to hold conversations with other players as they go about their everyday lives. Each player starts out the game by creating a profile. This includes sharing their age, relationship status, a short bio, and one photo to use as their profile picture. Every day, the players are allowed to share a status update, explaining their thoughts for the day. Sometimes, either through rewards or passing a certain milestone, the players are allowed to upload another photo to their profile. Throughout the competition the Circle app remains the only way players can communicate with each other.

During a typical episode, the Circle prompts participation in a minigame. Tim Harcourt of Studio Lambert says that "some games were really good for bonding them, some were really good for them learning about each other, some were good for testing who's a catfish, some could have been more divisive."

Most episodes also included a rating exercise. Each player would rank others in The Circle, then an average score would determine the overall placements of each player. Depending on how high or low their average placement was, the player's ranking would determine whether they became an influencer. Typically, the two players with the top rankings would be Influencers, with the advantage of determining the player being eliminated, or "blocked."

=== Apartment building ===
The first series of the show was produced in London.

From the second series of The Circle, production was moved to a new apartment building in Salford, England⁣ – this also became the location of production for other versions of the show. The apartment building is always prepared with twelve furnished and ready-to-use apartments for the players to live in. The building also has an exercise room and a rooftop lounge, which are also outfitted with cameras and television screens. One room in the building, called "the testimonial room," is the room players go to after they are blocked to create their goodbye video to the remaining players. On the outside of the building is a large, lit up circle made of a roughly 25-metre (82 ft) diameter aluminium track with LED lights strung through and around the circle.

The University of Salford's former Centenary Building, located opposite from the apartments, was used as a production base during the series. At any time in the control room, there were between twenty and thirty producers and camera operators working, recording, and sending all the messages from The Circle.

== Series overview ==
Broadcast history of The Circle
Series	Episodes	Originally released		Players	Winner	Runner-up
Series	Episodes	First released	Last released	Players	Winner	Runner-up
1	18	18 September 2018	8 October 2018	15	Alex Hobern as "Kate"	Freddie Bentley
2	22	24 September 2019	18 October 2019	15	Paddy Smyth	Georgina Elliott
Celeb	6	9 March 2021	15 March 2021	12	Lady Leshurr as "Big Narstie"	Saffron Barker
3	21	16 March 2021	9 April 2021	15	Natalya Platonova as "Felix"	Manrika Khaira

== Awards and nominations ==
Year	Award	Category	Result	Ref.
2019	Broadcasting Press Guild Awards	Innovation Award	Nominated	
2019	Broadcast Tech Innovation Awards	Best Innovative Use of Technology in Storytelling	Won	
2019	C21 International Format Awards	Best Competition Reality Format	Won	
2020	National Television Awards	Challenge Show	Nominated	
2020	Realscreen Awards	Reality Competition	Longlisted	
2020	Realscreen Awards	Best New Format	Nominated	
2020	RTS Programme Awards	Best Formatted Popular Factual Programme	Nominated	
