= Sophie Willan =

British actress, writer, presenter and comedian (born 1987)

- Born: Sophie Willan; 21 October 1987 (age 38); Bolton, Lancashire, England
- Occupations: Comedian; actress; presenter; narrator; writer
- Known for: Alma's Not Normal
- Children: 1
- Website: sophiewillan.com

Sophie Willan (born 21 October 1987) is an English actress, presenter, narrator, writer and comedian. She has won three BAFTAs for her television sitcom Alma's Not Normal.

== Early life ==
Sophie Willan was born on 21 October 1987; she grew up in Bolton, Lancashire and spent time in care as a child, as her mother was a heroin addict. She later worked as an escort to fund her arts career.

== Theatre and stand-up comedy ==
Willan began her arts career in theatre, founding feminist theatre and cabaret group Eggs Collective.

Willan's stand-up takes inspiration from her unusual life experiences. In 2015 she won the Magners New Comedian of the Year award.

In 2016 she took her debut stand-up series On Record, based on her experiences of growing up in and out of the care system, to the Edinburgh Fringe Festival. A nationwide tour followed in 2017, including 10 dates at London's Soho Theatre and a commission to adapt the show into a BBC Radio 4 series, with a second series being approved.

Her second show, Branded, was an exploration of the labels applied to Willan by other people. In the show she addressed her past as a sex worker. The show received a positive review in The Guardian. Willan performed the show at the Edinburgh Fringe Festival 2017, receiving a Herald Angel Award and a nomination for Best Show.

== Television ==
Willan was the narrator of Channel 4'’s The Circle and was cast in BBC One's Still Open All Hours, She portrayed Carol in series 4 of CBBC's sketch show Class Dismissed and has performed comedy in Live from the Comedy Store for (Comedy Central), in As Yet Untitled for Dave and in The Last Leg Correspondents for Channel 4.

She has been nominated as a Chortle Best Newcomer, honoured on the BBC New Talent Hot List and became the first recipient of the BBC's Caroline Aherne Comedy Bursary. She was a nominee for South Bank Sky Arts Award for Best Breakthrough in 2018.

She played the character Jessie in the TV Christmas film Click & Collect (2018) which also starred Stephen Merchant.

In 2020, following the success of the pilot episode of her sitcom Alma's Not Normal, which she wrote and starred in, as the title character Alma Nuthall, it was commissioned for a full series by BBC Two and broadcast in 2021. The Times said, "Willan's writing is skilled and clearly very personal... uplifting and strangely enchanting." A second series of the show was commissioned in 2022 and premiered on 7 October 2024.

In 2023 Willan appeared as Maeve in the second series of the BBC One prison drama Time.

Willan appeared as a contestant on the seventeenth series of the Channel 4 show Taskmaster which launched in March 2024. Previewing the first episode, The Guardian's Phil Harrison commented that "Already, Willan looks like a potential all-timer contestant". She also appeared in Ludwig in 2024 as Holly Pinder. Since 2024, Willan has been a guest captain on Never Mind the Buzzcocks. In September 2025, Willan was announced as a guest judge on the seventh series of RuPaul's Drag Race UK. She took over from Sara Pascoe as host of BBC's The Great British Sewing Bee, starting with the Christmas Celebrity Special in December 2025.

In February and March 2026, Willan portrayed Bev in the BBC Two sitcom Small Prophets.

== Other work ==
In 2015, Willan secured funding of over £100,000 to create the multi-platform literary project Stories of Care, creating and curating short stories written by fellow care leavers. The project recruited care leavers across North West England to contribute to the creation of a published children's anthology for looked-after children and ran until 2023.

== Personal life ==
On 18 May 2025, Willan announced via Instagram that she and her partner, chef Carniel Francis Levy, were expecting a child. Their son was born on 30 November 2025.

== Awards ==
Willan won a BAFTA Television Craft Award for Best Writer: Comedy for the pilot of Alma's Not Normal. At the 2022 British Academy Television Awards, Willan was awarded the Best Female Comedy Performance for her performance in the series, which was also nominated for Best Scripted Comedy.

In 2022, Willan received an honorary doctorate from the University of Bolton for her contribution to television and comedy.
