= List of All3Media television programmes =

This is a list of programs produced by All3Media, the UK's largest independent television, film and digital production and distribution company and is currently owned by RedBird IMI, a joint venture between RedBird Capital Partners and UAE-funded enterprise International Media Investments. The company was formed in 2003 after the Chrysalis Group's television arm was acquired and rebranded North One.

== Television series and miniseries ==
=== South Pacific Pictures ===
| Title | Network | Original running | Notes |
|---|---|---|---|
| Marlin Bay | TVNZ 1 | 1991–1994 | |
| The Other Side of Paradise | Network 10; ITV | 1992 | co-production with Grundy Television and Central Independent Television |
| Shortland Street | TVNZ 2 | 1992–present | co-production with Fremantle Australia |
| Jackson's Wharf | TVNZ | 1999–2000 | |
| Mercy Peak | TVNZ 1 | 2001–2004 | |
| Being Eve | TV3 | 2001–2002 | |
| Mataku | TV3 | 2002 | |
| New Zealand Idol | TVNZ 2 | 2004 | co-production with Grundy Television |
| Kidnapped | BBC One | 2005 | |
| Outrageous Fortune | TV3 | 2005-2010 | |
| Interrogation | Sky Open | 2005 | |
| Maddigan's Quest | TV3; Nine Network; BBC | 2006 | co-production with Burberry Productions |
| How Clean Is Your House? | TVNZ 1 | 2006–2007 | |
| Wa$ted! | TV3 | 2007–2008 | co-production with Fumes TV |
| HotSpell | SBS | 2007 | co-production with Heiress Films |
| Go Girls | TVNZ 2 | 2009–2013 | |
| Diplomatic Immunity | TVNZ 1 | 2009 | |
| Scoundrels | ABC | 2010 | co-production with Old Friends Productions, Long Run Productions and ABC Studios |
| The Almighty Johnsons | TV3 | 2011-2013 | |
| Nothing Trivial | TVNZ 1 | 2011–2014 | |
| The Blue Rose | TV3 | 2013 | |
| Step Dave | TVNZ 2 | 2014–2015 | |
| The Brokenwood Mysteries | Sky Open/TVNZ 1 | 2014–present | |
| Tatau | BBC Three | 2015 | co-production with Touchpaper TV |
| Westside | Three | 2015–2020 | |
| Word Up | TVNZ 1 | 2015 | |
| 800 Words | Seven Network; TVNZ 1 | 2015–2018 | co-production with Seven Productions |
| The Bad Seed | TVNZ 1 | 2019 | co-production with Jump Film & TV |
| The Sounds | CBC | 2020 | co-production with Shaftesbury Films and Acorn Media Enterprises |

=== North One Television ===
| Title | Network | Original running | Notes |
|---|---|---|---|
| The Unforgettable | ITV | 2000–2012 | continued from Watchmaker Productions |
| Fifth Gear | Channel 5/Discovery/History/Quest/Discovery+ | 2002–present | |
| AXN Shakedown | AXN | 2004–2006 | co-production with Sony Pictures Television International; Owned by Sony Pictures Television |
| The Gadget Show | Channel 5 | 2004–present | |
| I Didn't Know That | National Geographic UK | 2006–2012 | |
| ASBO Teen to Beauty Queen | Channel 5 | 2006 | |
| New Hero of Comedy | Channel 4 | 2008 | co-production with Tiger Aspect Productions and Shine TV |
| The Boat that Guy Built | BBC One | 2011 | |
| Gadget Man | Channel 4 | 2012–2015 | |
| Ross Noble: Freewheeling | Dave | 2013–2015 | co-production with Stunt Baby Productions |
| Speed with Guy Martin | Channel 4 | 2013–present | |
| Storage Hunters | Dave | 2014–2016 | co-production with T Group Productions and Hard Boiled Entertainment |
| Travel Man | Channel 4 | 2015–present | |
| Britain's Best Loved Sitcoms | Channel 4 | 2015 | |
| Celebrity Haunted Mansion | W | 2016–2018 | |
| Eat Your Heart Out with Nick Helm | Dave | 2017 | |
| Eddie Eats America | Dave | 2018 | |
| Paul Hollywood Eats... | Channel 4 | 2020–present | |
| Ricky and Ralf's Very Northern Road Trip | Yesterday | 2020 | |
| Red Dwarf: The First Three Million Years | Dave | 2020 | |
| Guy Martin's Battle for Britain | Channel 4 | 2021 | |
| The Secrets of Your Takeaway | Channel 5 | 2021–2022 | |
| Hobby Man | Channel 4 | 2022–present | co-production with Motion Content Group |

=== IDTV ===
| Title | Network | Original running | Notes |
|---|---|---|---|
| De Club van Sinterklaas | Fox Kids; Jetix; RTL 4 | 1999–2009 | |
| Campinglife | RTL 4 | 2001–2016 | |
| Lingo | GSN | 2002–2007 | as IDTV International; co-production with Laurelwood Entertainment |

=== Bentley Productions ===
| Title | Network | Original running | Notes |
|---|---|---|---|
| Midsomer Murders | ITV | 1997–present | |
| The Broker's Man | BBC One | 1997–1998 | |
| Ultimate Force | ITV | 2002–2008 | |

=== Assembly Film and Television ===
| Title | Network | Original running | Notes |
|---|---|---|---|
| Black Books | Channel 4 | 2000–2004 | co-production with Big Talk Productions |
| Demetri Martin: If I | BBC One | 2004 | |

=== Watchmaker Productions ===
| Title | Network | Original running | Notes |
|---|---|---|---|
| Clive James's Postcard from... | BBC One, ITV | 1989–1999 | co-production with Carlton Television |

=== Lion Television ===
| Title | Network | Original running | Notes |
|---|---|---|---|
| Hotel | BBC One | 1997 | |
| Paddington Green | BBC One | 1998–2001 | |
| Egypt's Golden Empire | PBS | 2001 | |
| Homes Under the Hammer | BBC One | 2003–present | as Lion Television Scotland |
| History Detectives | PBS | 2003–2014 | co-production with Oregon Public Broadcasting |
| Playing it Straight | Fox | 2004 | |
| Cash Cab | ITV | 2005–2006 | |
| Tales from the Green Valley | BBC Two | 2005 | |
| Vegas Virgins | Challenge | 2005 | |
| Dealing with Dickinson | BBC One | 2005 | |
| The Queen's Cavalry | BBC One | 2005 | |
| Cash Cab USA | Discovery Channel/Bravo | 2005–present | |
| S.W.A.T. USA | Court TV | 2006 | |
| The Big Day | BBC One | 2007 | |
| Horrible Histories (original) | CBBC | 2009–2014 | co-production with Citrus Television; Owned and distributed by BBC Worldwide |
| Horrible Histories: Gory Games | CBBC | 2011–2018 | co-production with Citrus Television; Owned and distributed by BBC Worldwide |
| Officially Amazing | CBBC | 2013–2016 | |
| Tudor Monastery Farm | BBC Two | 2013 | |
| Sexy Beasts | BBC Three/Netflix | 2014–2021 | |
| Junk Food Flip | Cooking Channel | 2014–2016 | |
| Secrets of the Castle | BBC Two | 2014 | |
| The Secret History of the British Garden | BBC Two | 2015 | co-production with Alexandra Henderson Associates |
| Horrible Histories (revival) | CBBC | 2015–present | Owned and distributed by BBC Worldwide/BBC Studios |
| Supertruckers | Quest | 2015–2017 | |
| Mary Beard's Ultimate Rome: Empire Without Limit | BBC Two | 2016 | |
| Driven to Love | We TV | 2016–2017 | Co-produced with DWE Talent, Knockout Entertainment, Matar Productions and Zig Zag Productions |
| Mary Bread's Ultimate Rome: Empire Without Limit | BBC Two | 2016 | |
| Six Degrees of Murder | Investigation Discovery | 2016–2017 | |
| Hoarder SOS | Channel 4 | 2016 | |
| Officially Amazing Goes Bonkers | CBBC | 2017–2018 | |
| Play Your Pets Right | Sky Kids | 2018–2019 | |
| Step Up To The Plate | CBBC | 2019–present | |
| Mary Beard's Shock to the Beard | BBC Two | 2020 | |
| The Battle of Britain: 3 Days That Saved the Nation | Channel 5 | 2020 | |
| Britain's Biggest Dig | BBC Two | 2020 | |
| 22 Kids & Counting | Channel 5 | 2021–2022 | |
| Tomb Hunters | Smithsonian Channel | 2021 | co-production with At Land Productions |
| Jason Biggs: Cash at Your Door | E! | 2021–present | as Lion Television USA |
| Virtually Home | BBC One | 2021 | as Lion Television Scotland |
| Mary Beard's Forbidden Art | BBC Two | 2022 | |
| Stolen: Catching the Art Thieves | BBC Two | 2022 | as Lion Television Scotland |
| Arctic from Above | Sky Nature | 2023 | |

=== New Pictures ===
| Title | Network | Original running | Notes |
|---|---|---|---|
| The Missing | BBC One; Starz | 2014–2016 | co-production with Company Pictures, Two Brothers Pictures and Playground Entertainment |
| Indian Summers | Channel 4 PBS | 2015–2016 | co-production with Biscuit Films |
| Rellik | BBC One; Cinemax | 2017 | co-production with Two Brothers Pictures |
| Requiem | BBC One; Netflix | 2018 | |
| The Innocents | Netflix | 2018 | |
| The Spanish Princess | Starz | 2019–2020 | co-production with Playground Entertainment, Giddy Junk and Jumping Joseph |
| Catherine the Great | Sky Atlantic; HBO | 2019 | co-production with Origin Pictures |
| White House Farm | ITV | 2020 | |
| COBRA | Sky One/Sky Max | 2020–present | co-production with Sky Studios |
| The Deceived | Channel 5 Virgin Media One | 2020 | |
| Des | ITV | 2020 | |
| Dalgliesh | Channel 5 Acorn TV | 2021–present | |
| The Blue | Paramount+ | 2022 | co-production with Paramount Television International Studios |
| The Long Shadow | ITV | 2023 | |
| Champion | BBC One Netflix | 2023 | |
| No Escape | Paramount+ | 2023 | |
| Protection | ITV | 2024 | |
| Crongton | BBC Three | 2025 | co-production with All3Media International |

=== Lime Pictures ===
| Title | Network | Original running | Notes |
|---|---|---|---|
| Grange Hill | BBC One/CBBC | 1978–2008 | |
| Brookside | Channel 4 | 1982–2003 | |
| Damon and Debbie | Channel 4 | 1987 | |
| Hollyoaks | Channel 4/E4 | 1995–present | |
| Bonkers | ITV | 2007 | |
| Living on the Edge | MTV | 2007–2008 | |
| Apparitions | BBC One | 2008 | |
| Hollyoaks Later | E4 | 2008–2025 | |
| The Season | BBC Two | 2009–2010 | |
| The Well | BBC Two | 2010 | |
| Shelfstackers | BBC Two | 2010 | |
| The Only Way Is Essex | ITV2/ITVBe | 2010–present | |
| Combat Kids | CBBC | 2010 | |
| House of Anubis | Nickelodeon | 2011–2013 | co-production with Studio 100 and Nickelodeon Productions; Owned by Studio 100 |
| Geordie Shore | MTV | 2011–2022 | Owned by Paramount Global Content Distribution |
| Fresh Meat | Channel 4 | 2011–2016 | co-production with Objective Productions |
| The Case | BBC One | 2011 | |
| Mark Wright's Hollywood Nights | ITV2 | 2012 | |
| Rocket's Island | CBBC | 2012–2015 | |
| Educating Joey Essex | ITV2 | 2014–2016 | |
| The Singles Project | Bravo | 2014 | co-production with All3Media America, Goodbye Pictures and Bravo Media Productions; Owned by NBCUniversal Syndication Studios |
| The Evermoor Chronicles | Disney Channel | 2014–2017 | Owned by Disney Platform Distribution |
| Life on Marbs | ITVBe | 2015 | |
| Work Out New York | Bravo | 2015–2016 | co-production with All3Media America and Bravo Media Productions; Owned by NBCUniversal Syndication Studios |
| Celebs Go Dating | E4 | 2016–present | |
| Free Rein | Netflix | 2017–2019 | |
| Elliott & Sadie's Wedding | ITVBe | 2017 | |
| Relative Success with Tabatha | Bravo | 2018 | co-production with All3Media America and Bravo Media Productions; Owned by NBCUniversal Syndication Studios |
| True Love or True Lies | MTV | 2018–2019 | |
| Gemma Collins: Diva | ITVBe | 2018–present | |
| Dating #NoFilter | E! | 2019–present | co-production with All3Media America |
| Hollyoaks Favourites | E4 | 2020–2021 | |
| Zero Chill | Netflix | 2021 | |
| Who Do You Believe? | ABC | 2022 | co-production with All3Media America |
| Are You the One? UK | Paramount+ | 2022–present | Owned by Paramount Global Distribution Group |
| Dance Monsters | Netflix | 2022–present | co-production with All3Media America |
| Wolf King | Netflix | 2025 | |

==== Wise Owl Films ====
| Title | Network | Original running | Notes |
|---|---|---|---|
| The Metro: A Rail Life Story | ITV | 2020 | |
| David Jason's Great British Inventions | More 4 | 2020 | |
| When Bob Marley Came to Britain | BBC Two | 2020 | Documentary |
| Guy Garvey: From the Vaults | Sky Arts | 2020 | |
| Yorkshire Firefighters | BBC Two | 2021 | |

=== Company Pictures ===
| Title | Network | Original running | Notes |
|---|---|---|---|
| The Young Person's Guide to Becoming a Rock Star | Channel 4 | 1998 | |
| Anna Karenina | Channel 4 | 2000 | co-production with WGBH Boston |
| Never Never | Channel 4 | 2000 | |
| Cor, Blimey! | ITV | 2000 | |
| Rose and Maloney | ITV | 2002–2005 | |
| Impact | ITV | 2002 | |
| P.O.W. | ITV | 2003 | |
| Shameless | Channel 4 | 2004–2013 | |
| Lawless | ITV | 2004 | |
| Elizabeth I | Channel 4 HBO | 2005 | Miniseries co-production with HBO Entertainment and HBO Films |
| The Ghost Squad | Channel 4 | 2005 | |
| Faith | BBC One | 2005 | |
| Wild at Heart | ITV | 2006–2012 | co-production with STV Studios |
| Skins | E4 | 2007–2013 | co-production with Storm Dog Films |
| Inspector George Gently | BBC One | 2007–2017 | |
| Life Is Wild | The CW | 2007–2008 | co-production with 34 Films and CBS Paramount Television; Owned by CBS Media Ventures |
| Mansfield Park | ITV | 2007 | |
| Who Gets the Dog? | ITV | 2007 | co-production with Isle of Man Film |
| The Palace | ITV | 2008 | |
| Generation Kill | HBO | 2008 | co-production with Blown Deadline Productions; Owned by HBO |
| The Devil's Whore | Channel 4 | 2008 | |
| Einstein and Eddington | BBC Two | 2008 | |
| Fallout | Channel 4 | 2008 | |
| The Take | Sky One | 2009 | |
| Skins USA | MTV | 2011 | co-production with Storm Dog Films, Entertainment One and MTV Production Development |
| The Runaway | Sky One | 2011 | |
| The Shadow Line | BBC Two | 2011 | co-productiom with Eight Rooks Ltd, Baby Cow Productions, CinemaNX and Isle of Man Film |
| Beaver Falls | E4 | 2011-2012 | |
| The White Queen | BBC One; Starz | 2013 | co-production with Playground Entertainment and Czar Television |
| The Village | BBC One | 2013–2014 | |
| Truckers | BBC One | 2013 | |
| Moonfleet | Sky One | 2013 | |
| London Irish | Channel 4 | 2013 | |
| New Worlds | Channel 4 | 2014 | |
| The Missing | BBC One; Starz | 2014–2016 | co-production with New Pictures, Two Brothers Pictures and Playground Entertainment |
| Red Rock | Virgin Media One; BBC One/BBC Two | 2015–2020 | co-production with Element Pictures |
| Wolf Hall | BBC Two | 2015 | |
| The White Princess | Starz; Drama | 2017 | Miniseries; co-production with Playground Entertainment |
| Bucket | BBC Four | 2017–present | co-production with Solution 3 |
| Bulletproof | Sky One | 2018–2021 | co-production with Vertigo Films, Sky Studios and Unstoppable Film & Television; Owned by NBCUniversal |
| Blood | Channel 5 | 2018 | |
| Van der Valk | ITV | 2020–present | co-production with All3Media International, Masterpiece, ARD Degeto and NL Film & TV |
| Agatha Raisin | Acorn TV | 2015–2022 | |
| Ellis | Channel 5 Acorn TV | 2024 | |

=== Maverick Television ===
| Title | Network | Original running | Notes |
|---|---|---|---|
| Embarrassing Illnesses | Channel 4 | 2001 | |
| Fat Chance | ITV | 2004 | |
| How To Look Good Naked | Channel 4/Really | 2006–present | |
| Embarrassing Bodies | Channel 4/E4 | 2007–present | |
| Bizarre ER | BBC Three/TLC/E4 | 2008–2017 | |
| Miss Naked Beauty | Channel 4 | 2008 | |
| Children's Hospital | ITV | 2010 | |
| Safebreakers | Sky One | 2011 | |
| Billy Connolly's Route 66 | ITV | 2011 | |
| Operation Ouch! | CBBC | 2012–present | |
| Was It Something I Said? | Channel 4 | 2013 | co-production with That Mitchell & Webb Company |
| Chrisley Knows Best | USA Network | 2014–2023 | co-production with All3Media America |
| Dinosaur Britain | ITV | 2015 | |
| Growing Up Chrisley | USA Network/E! | 2019–2022 | co-production with All3Media America and Todd Christley Productions |
| Inside the Ritz Hotel | ITV | 2019 | |
| 10 Years Younger in 10 Days | Channel 5 | 2020–present | |
| DeMarcus Family Rules | Netflix | 2020 | co-production with All3Media America and Todd Chrisley Productions |
| Elephant Hospital | Channel 5 | 2020 | co-production with Motion Content Group |
| The American Barbecue Showdown | Netflix | 2020–present | co-production with All3Media America |
| Kept Alive | Oxygen | TBA | |

=== Studio Lambert ===
| Title | Years | Network | Notes |
|---|---|---|---|
| Undercover Boss | 2009–2021 | Channel 4/ITV | |
| Undercover Boss USA | 2010–2022 | CBS | co-production with All3Media America |
| Ultimate Traveller | 2010 | Channel 4 | |
| Southern Fried Stings | 2010–2011 | TruTV | co-production with Zoo Productions |
| Four in a Bed | 2010–present | Channel 4 | |
| Love Thy Neighbour | 2011 | Channel 4/More 4 | |
| The Pitch | 2012–2013 | AMC | co-production with All3Media America and AMC Studios |
| Girlfriends | 2012–2013 | ITV2 | |
| Gogglebox | 2013–present | Channel 4 | |
| The Million Second Quiz | 2013 | NBC | co-production with All3Media America, Ryan Seacrest Productions, Bill's Market & Television Productions and Universal Television |
| The People's Couch | 2013–2016 | Bravo | co-production with All3Media America and Bravo Media Productions; Co-owned by NBCUniversal Syndication Studios |
| True Tori | Lifetime | 2014 | co-production with All3Media America, Life in the Bowl Productions and Big Country Entertainment |
| The Great Interior Design Challenge | 2014–2017 | BBC Two | |
| Inside Job | 2014 | TNT | co-production with All3Media America and TNT Originals, Inc. Owned by Warner Bros. Discovery |
| Tattoo Fixers | 2015–2019 | E4 | |
| Job or No Job | 2015 | ABC Family | co-production with All3Media America; Owned by Disney Platform Distribution |
| The Fear | 2015 | BBC Three | |
| Body Fixers | 2016–2017 | E4 | |
| Naked Attraction | 2016–present | Channel 4 | as Studio Lambert North |
| Gogglebox Ireland | 2016–present | Virgin Media One | co-production with Kite Entertainment |
| Tattoo Artist of the Year | 2017 | E4 | |
| Second Wives Club | 2017 | E! | co-production with All3Media America |
| Three Girls | 2017 | BBC One | |
| Spa Wars | 2017 | ITVBe | |
| Buy It Now | 2018 | Channel 4 | zs Glitterbox |
| The Circle | 2018–2021 | Channel 4 | Part of The Circle franchise; co-production with Motion Content Group |
| Race Across the World | 2019–present | BBC Two | |
| The Feed | 2019 | Virgin Media; Amazon Prime Video | co-productiom with Amazon Studios, All3Media International and Liberty Global |
| The Circle US | 2020–present | Netflix | co-production with Motion Content Group |
| The Circle Brazil | 2020 | Netflix | co-production with Motion Content Group |
| The Circle France | 2020 | Netflix | co-production with Motion Content Group |
| Celebrity Watch Party | 2020 | Fox | co-production with All3Media America |
| The Hustler | 2021 | ABC | co-production with All3Media America |
| Three Families | 2021 | BBC One | |
| The Traitors | 2022–present | BBC One | |
| The Traitors US | 2023–present | Peacock | as Studio Lambert Scotland |

=== All3Media International ===
| Title | Network | Original running | Notes |
|---|---|---|---|
| Hinterland | S4C | 2013–2016 | co-production with Fiction Factory and Tinopolis |
| Mrs. Wilson | BBC One | 2018 | co-production with Snowed-In Productions and Masterpiece |
| The Widow | ITV; Amazon Prime Video | 2019 | co-production with Two Brothers Pictures |
| Van der Valk | ITV | 2020–present | co-production with Company Pictures, NL Film, ARD Degeto and Masterpiece |
| All Creatures Great and Small | Channel 5 | 2020–present | co-production with Playground Entertainment, Screen Yorkshire and Masterpiece |
| Roadkill | BBC One | 2020 | co-production with The Forge and Masterpiece |
| The Drowning | Channel 5 | 2021 | co-production with Unstoppable Film & Television and GPO Productions |
| Too Close | ITV | 2021 | co-production with Snowed-In Productions |
| Annika | Alibi | 2021 | co-production with Black Camel Pictures |
| The Tourist | BBC One; HBO Max; Stan | 2022–present | co-production with Two Brothers Pictures, Highway Productions, South Australian Film Corporation, BBC Studios, ZDF and Stan |
| The Holiday | Channel 5 | 2022–present | co-production with Projector Pictures and Clapperboard Studios |
| Queer as Folk | Peacock | 2022–present | co-production with Universal Content Productions, Red Production Company, Piece of Work and Furnace Room Films. |
| Accused | Fox | 2023–present | co production with Sony Pictures Television and FOX Entertainment |

=== Red Rooster Film & Television Entertainment ===
| Title | Network | Original running | Notes |
|---|---|---|---|
| Body & Soul | ITV | 1993 | co-production with Carlton Television |
| Wycliffe | ITV | 1993–1998 | co-production with HTV |
| Monty the Dog | BBC One | 1994–1995 | co-production with Ealing Animation and Kick Productions |
| Crocodile Shoes | BBC One | 1994 | co-production with Big Boy Productions |
| The Sculptress | BBC One | 1996 | |

=== Zoo Productions ===
| Title | Network | Original running | Notes |
|---|---|---|---|
| The Blame Game | MTV | 1999–2000 | |
| Girls Behaving Badly | Oxygen | 2002–2005 | co-production with Sony Pictures Television |
| Are You Smarter than a 5th Grader? | Fox/Syndication | 2007–2011 | co-production with Mark Burnett Productions |
| Speeders | TruTV | 2007–2009 | |
| How'd You Get So Rich? | TV Land | 2009–2010 | |
| Over the Limit | TruTV | 2010 | |
| Southern Fried Stings | TruTV | 2010–2011 | co-production with Studio Lambert |
| Family Game Night | Discovery Family | 2010–2014 | co-production with All3Media America and Hasbro Studios |
| Lingo | Game Show Network | season 5; 2011 | |
| PrankStars | Disney Channel/Disney XD | 2011 | |
| It's Worth What? | NBC | 2011 | co-production with Merv Griffin Entertainment |
| World's Worst Tenants | TruTV | 2012–2013 | |
| Slednecks | MTV | 2014 | co-production with All3Media America, Parallel Entertainment Pictures and MTV Production Development |

=== Optomen ===
| Title | Network | Original running | Notes |
|---|---|---|---|
| Old Bear Stories | ITV | 1993–1997 | co-production with Ealing Animation |
| Police Camera Action! | ITV | 1994–2010 | |
| Two Fat Ladies | BBC Two | 1996–1999 | |
| The Naked Chef | BBC Two | 1999–2001 | |
| Ramsay's Kitchen Nightmares | Channel 4 | 2004–2014 | |
| The F Word | Channel 4 | 2005–2014 | |
| Great British Menu | BBC Two | 2006–present | |
| Kitchen Criminals | BBC Two | 2007 | |
| Kitchen Nightmares | Fox | 2007–2014 | co-production with ITV Studios America and A. Smith & Co. Productions |
| What to Eat Now | BBC Two | 2008–2009 | |
| Worst Cooks in America | Food Network | 2010–present | |
| Kevin McCloud's Man Made Home | Channel 4 | 2012–2013 | co-production with Concrete Telly |
| Hotel GB | Channel 4 | 2012 | |
| Food Glorious Food | ITV | 2013 | co-production with Syco Entertainment |
| Kick Ass Kung Fu | Sky One | 2013 | |
| Escape to the Wild | Channel 4 | 2015 | |
| Employable Me | BBC Two | 2016–2017 | |
| Worst Bakers in America | Food Network | 2016–present | |
| The Secret World of Posh Pets | ITV | 2017 | |
| Genderquake | Channel 4 | 2018 | |
| Absolutely Ascot | ITVBe | 2018–2019 | |
| When I Grow Up | Channel 4 | 2019 | |
| Breaking Fashion | BBC One | 2019 | |
| Snackmasters | Channel 4 | 2019–2021 | |
| Crazy Delicious | Channel 4 | 2020 | |
| Tyson Fury: The Gypsy King | ITV | 2020 | |
| Highlife | Channel 4 | 2021 | |
| London Lit | Discovery+ | 2022–present | co-production with Cr8tive Row and Luti Media |
| Olivia Attwood: Getting Filthy Rich | ITV2 | 2022–present | |
| Vardy vs Rooney: The Wagatha Trial | Discovery+ | 2022 | |

=== One Potato Two Potato ===
| Title | Network | Original running | Notes |
|---|---|---|---|
| MasterChef | Fox | 2010–present | co-production with Endemol Shine North America; Owned by Banijay |
| Junior MasterChef Pinoy Edition | ABS-CBN | 2011-2012 | co-production with ABS-CBN Studios and Reveille Productions Philippine version of the American series of the same name. |
| Gordon Behind Bars | Channel 4 | 2012 | |
| Gordon Ramsay's Ultimate Cookery Course | Channel 4 | 2012 | |
| Hotel Hell | Fox | 2012–2016 | |
| MasterChef Pinoy Edition | ABS-CBN | 2012-2013 | co-production with ABS-CBN Studios and Shine International Philippine version of the American series of the same name. |
| Food Court Wars | Food Network | 2013-2014 | |
| MasterChef Junior | Fox | 2013–2024 | co-production with Endemol Shine North America; Owned by Banijay |

=== John Stanley Productions ===
| Title | Network | Original running | Notes |
|---|---|---|---|
| Pompidou | BBC Two | 2015 | |
| Relatively Clever | Sky One | 2015 | |
| Marley's Ghosts | Gold | 2015–2016 | co-production with Objective Fiction |
| Bull | Gold | 2015 | |

=== Unstoppable Film & Television ===
| Title | Network | Original running | Notes |
|---|---|---|---|
| The Drowning | Channel 5 | 2021 | co-production with All3Media International and GPO Productions |
| Viewpoint | ITV | 2021 | co-production with Tiger Aspect Productions |

=== All3Media America ===
| Title | Network | Original running | Notes |
|---|---|---|---|
| Undercover Boss USA | CBS | 2010–2022 | co-production with Studio Lambert |
| The Pitch | AMC | 2012–2013 | co-production with Studio Lambert and AMC Studios |
| The Million Second Quiz | NBC | 2013 | co-production with Studio Lambert, Ryan Seacrest Productions, Bill's Market & Television Productions and Universal Television; Owned by NBCUniversal Global Distribution |
| The People's Couch | Bravo | 2013–2016 | co-production with Studio Lambert and Bravo Media Productions |
| Inside Job | TNT | 2014 | co-production with Studio Lambert and TNT Originals, Inc. Owned by Warner Bros. Discovery |
| Chrisley Knows Best | USA Network | 2014–2022 | co-production with Maverick Television and USA Network Media Productions |
| True Tori | Lifetime | 2014 | co-production with Studio Lambert, Life in a Bowl Productions and Big Country Entertainment |
| The Singles Project | Bravo | 2014 | co-production with Lime Pictures, Goodbye Pictures and Bravo Media Productions; Owned by NBCUniversal Global Distribution |
| Slednecks | MTV | 2014 | co-production with Zoo Productions, Parallel Entertainment Pictures and MTV Production Development; Owned by Paramount Global Content Distribution |
| Family Game Night | Discovery Family | 2014 | season 5; co-production with Zoo Productions and Hasbro Studios |
| Job or No Job | ABC Family | 2015 | co-production with Studio Lambert |
| Make Me a Millionaire Inventor | CNBC | 2015–2016 | co-production with Objective Productions USA |
| Work Out New York | Bravo | 2015–2016 | co-production with Lime Pictures and Bravo Media Productions; Owned by NBCUniversal Global Distribution |
| The Arrangement | E! | 2017–2018 | co-production with Main Event Media, Sneaky Pictures and Universal Cable Productions; Owned by NBCUniversal Global Distribution |
| Hollywood Darlings | Pop | 2017–2018 | co-production with Main Event Media and Pop Media Group |
| Second Wives Club | E! | 2017 | co-production with Studio Lambert and E! Entertainment Television |
| The F Word | Fox Broadcasting Company | 2017 | co-production with Studio Ramsay |
| According to Chrisley | USA Network | 2017 | co-production with Maverick Television, Curly One Productions and USA Network Media Productions |
| Relative Success with Tabatha | Bravo | 2018 | co-production with Bravo Media Productions; Owned by NBCUniversal |
| It Was Him: The Many Murders of Ed Edwards | Paramount Network | 2018 | co-production with Main Event Media, Turn Left Productions and Spike Cable Networks |
| Gordon Ramsay's 24 Hours to Hell and Back | Fox | 2018–2020 | co-production with Studio Ramsay |
| Dating #NoFilter | E! | 2019–present | co-production with Lime Pictures and E! Entertainment Television |
| Growing Up Chrisley | USA Network/E! | 2019–2022 | co-production with Maverick Television (seasons 1–2), Todd Chrisley Productions (season 3), USA Network Media Productions (seasons 1–2) and E! Entertainment Television (season 3) |
| Top Elf | Nickelodeon | 2019–2020 | co-production with Main Event Media, Ugly Brother Studios and Nickelodeon Productions |
| Flirty Dancing US | Fox | 2019–2020 | co-production with Second Star Productions and Objective Media Group America |
| Celebrity Watch Party | Fox | 2020 | co-production with Studio Lambert |
| DeMarcus Family Rules | Netflix | 2020 | co-production with Maverick Television and Todd Chrisley Productions |
| The American Barbecue Showdown | Netflix | 2020–present | co-production with Maverick Television |
| The Hustler | ABC | 2021 | co-production with Studio Lambert |
| Tattoo Redo | Netflix | 2021 | co-production with Best Production Company |
| The Cube USA | TBS | 2021–present | co-production with Objective Media Group America and 59th & Prairie Entertainment |
| 12 Dates of Christmas | HBO Max | 2020–2021 | co-production with Objective Media Group America |
| Eye Candy | The Roku Channel | 2021–present | co-production with Main Event Media, Nippon TV, Good Egg Entertainment and Suit & Thai |
| Sweet Life: Los Angeles | HBO Max | 2021–2022 | co-production with Main Event Media, Hoorae Media and Morning Drew Pictures |
| Dated and Related | Netflix | 2022–present | co-production with Great Scott Media and Main Event Media |
| Dance Monsters | Netflix | 2022–present | co-production with Lime Pictures |

=== Objective Media Group ===
| Title | Network | Original running | Notes |
|---|---|---|---|
| The Alphabet Game | BBC One | 1996–1997 | co-production with BBC North |
| Meet the Challenge | BBC One | 1998 | |
| Extreme Magic, Extreme Danger | ITV | 2000 | co-production with LWT |
| Secrets of Magic | BBC Two | 2003–2005 | |
| Peep Show | Channel 4 | 2003–2015 | |
| 19 Keys | Channel 5 | 2003 | co-production with Crook Productions |
| Bedsitcom | Channel 4 | 2003 | |
| Balls of Steel | Channel 4 | 2005–2008 | |
| Star Stories | Channel 4 | 2006–2008 | |
| The Real Hustle | BBC Three | 2006–2012 | co-production with Crook Productions |
| Trick or Treat | Channel 4 | 2007–2008 | |
| Dogface | E4 | 2007 | |
| The Peter Serafinowicz Show | BBC Two | 2007–2008 | |
| The Kevin Bishop Show | Channel 4 | 2008–2009 | |
| The Justin Lee Collins Show | ITV2 | 2009 | |
| Reggie Perrin | BBC One | 2009–2010 | |
| The Cube | ITV | 2009–present | co-production with Triple Brew Media |
| Derren Brown: The Events | Channel 4 | 2009 | |
| Robert's Web | Channel 4 | 2010 | co-production with That Mitchell & Web Co. |
| Pete versus Life | Channel 4 | 2010–2011 | |
| John Bishop's Britain | BBC One | 2010–2011 | co-production with 3 Amigos |
| Tool Academy | E4 | 2011-2012 | |
| Fresh Meat | Channel 4 | 2011–2016 | co-production with Lime Pictures |
| Mr & Mrs Hotty Hot Show | E4 | 2011 | |
| The Mad Bad Ad Show | Channel 4 | 2012 | |
| Face the Clock | Channel 4 | 2013 | as Objective Productions Scotland |
| Big Bad World | Comedy Central | 2013 | |
| Toast of London | Channel 4/BBC Two | 2013–present | co-production with Objective Fiction and Wiip |
| Relfex | BBC One | 2014 | |
| Bad Robots | E4 | 2014–2015 | |
| Killer Magic | BBC Three | 2015 | as Objective Productions Scotland |
| Beat the Brain | BBC Two | 2015 | co-production with Over the Top Productions |
| King of the Nerds | Sky One | 2015 | co-production with Electus |
| Make Me a Millionaire Inventor | CNBC | 2015–2016 | as Objective Productions USA co-production with All3Media America |
| Thief Trackers | BBC One | 2015–2017 | co-production with Crook Productions |
| Tricks of the Restaurant Trade | Channel 4 | 2016–2019 | as Objective Media Group Scotland co-production with Betty |
| Culinary Genius | ITV | 2017 | co-production with Studio Ramsay |
| Last Commanders | CBBC | 2018–2019 | as Objective Media Group Scotland co-production with Panda Television |
| Flirty Dancing US | Fox | 2019–2020 | as Objective Media Group America co-production with All3Media America and Second Star Productions |
| Saving Our Nurses | BBC One | 2020 | as Objective Media Group North; co-production with Betty |
| 12 Dates of Christmas | HBO Max | 2020–2021 | as Objective Media Group America co-production with All3Media America |
| Lingo | ITV1 | 2021–present | as Objective Media Group North co-production with Triple Brew Media |
| The Answer Trap | Channel 4 | 2021–present | as Objective Media Group Scotland co-production with Triple Brew Media and Motion Content Group |
| The Cube USA | TBS | 2021–present | as Objective Media Group America co-production with All3Media America and 59th & Prairie Entertainment |
| The Larkins | ITV1 | 2021–2022 | as Objective Media Group Scotland co-production with Objective Fiction and Genial Productions |
| Gordon Ramsay's Future Food Stars | BBC One | 2022–present | co-production with Studio Ramsay Global |
| The Great American Recipe | PBS | 2022–present | as Objective Media Group America co-production with VPM Media Corporation |

==== Objective Fiction ====
| Title | Network | Original running | Notes |
|---|---|---|---|
| Toast of London | Channel 4/BBC Two | 2013–present | co-production with Objective Media Group and Wiip |
| GameFace | Channel 4/E4 | 2014–present | |
| Marley's Ghosts | Gold | 2015–2016 | co-production with John Stanley Productions |
| Witless | BBC Three | 2016–2018 | |
| Year of the Rabbit | Channel 4 IFC | 2019 | |
| Feel Good | Channel 4/Netflix | 2020–2021 | |
| The Larkins | ITV1 | 2021-2022 | co-production with Objective Media Group Scotland and Genial Productions |

==== Triple Brew Media ====
| Title | Network | Original running | Notes |
|---|---|---|---|
| The Cube | ITV | 2009–present | co-production with Objective Media Group |
| Lingo | ITV | 2021–present | co-production with Objective Media Group North |
| The Answer Trap | Channel 4 | 2021–present | co-production with Objective Media Group Scotland and Motion Content Group |
| Gino's Cooking Up Love | ITV1 | 2022–present | |

==== Betty ====
| Title | Network | Original running | Notes |
|---|---|---|---|
| Freaky Eaters | BBC Three | 2007–2009 | |
| Outrageous Wasters | BBC Three | 2007 | |
| Country House Rescue | Channel 4 | 2008–2012 | |
| The Big Food Fight | Channel 4 | 2009 | |
| Wedding House | Channel 4 | 2010 | |
| The Joy of Teen Sex | Channel 4 | 2011 | |
| Dirty Sexy Things | E4 | 2011 | |
| Food Inspectors | BBC One | 2012–2014 | |
| The Undateables | Channel 4 | 2012–present | |
| Obsessive Compulsive Cleaners | Channel 4 | 2013–present | |
| Bear Grylls: Mission Survive | ITV | 2015–2016 | |
| Tricks of the Restaurant Trade | Channel 4 | 2016–2019 | co-production with Objective Media Group Scotland |
| Saving Our Nurses | BBC One | 2020 | co-production with Objective Media Group North |

==== Panda Television ====
| Title | Network | Original running | Notes |
|---|---|---|---|
| Partners in Rhyme | BBC One | 2017 | co-production with Accidentally On Purpose |
| Wedding Day Winners | BBC One | 2018 | |
| Last Commanders | CBBC | 2018–2019 | co-production with Objective Media Group Scotland |

==== Second Star Productions ====
| Title | Network | Original running | Notes |
|---|---|---|---|
| Stupid Man, Smart Phone | BBC Two | 2016 | co-production with Kaiel Productions |
| Britain Today Tonight | Channel 4 | 2017 | |
| Flirty Dancing | Channel 4 | 2019 | |
| Flirty Dancing US | Fox | 2019–2020 | co-production with Objective Media Group America and All3Media America |

=== Neal Street Productions ===
| Title | Years | Network | Notes |
|---|---|---|---|
| Call the Midwife | 2012–present | BBC One | |
| The Hollow Crown | 2012–2016 | BBC Two; PBS | co-production with NBCUniversal, Carnival Films and WNET |
| Penny Dreadful | 2014–2016 | Showtime; Sky Atlantic | co-productiom with Desert Wolf Productions and Showtime Networks |
| Britannia | 2018–present | Sky Atlantic; Epix | co-production with Vertigo Films and Sky Studios |
| Informer | 2018 | BBC One | |
| Penny Dreadful: City of Angels | 2020 | Showtime | co-production with Desert Wolf Productions and Showtime Networks |
| The Franchise | HBO | 2024–present | co-production with Dundee Productions |

=== Angelica Films ===
| Title | Network | Original running | Notes |
|---|---|---|---|
| Uncle Vanya | BBC Four | 2020 | co-production with BBC Arts and Sonia Friedman Productions |
| Harm | BBC Four | 2021 | co-production with BBC Arts and Bush Theatre |

=== Two Brothers Pictures ===
| Title | Network | Original running | Notes |
|---|---|---|---|
| The Missing | BBC One; Starz | 2014–2016 | co-production with New Pictures, Company Pictures and Playground Entertainment |
| Fried | BBC Three | 2015 | co-production with Bwark Productions |
| Fleabag | BBC Three/BBC One | 2016–2019 | |
| One of Us | BBC One; Netflix | 2016 | co-production with BBC Scotland |
| Liar | ITV | 2017–2020 | |
| Rellik | BBC One; Cinemax | 2017 | co-production with New Pictures |
| Wonderdate | BBC iPlayer | 2018 | |
| Strangers | ITV | 2018 | |
| Baltiste | BBC One | 2019–2021 | |
| The Widow | ITV/Amazon Prime Video | 2019 | |
| Back to Life | BBC Three | 2019–present | |
| Angela Black | ITV; Spectrum Originals | 2021 | |
| The Tourist | BBC One; Stan | 2022–present | co-production with Northview Productions, South Australian Film Corporation, All3Media International and ZDF Enterprises |
| Boat Story | BBC One | 2023 | |
| Dinosaur | BBC Scotland / Hulu | 2024 | |
| The Assassin | Amazon Video | 2025 | |
| Maya | Channel 4 | 2026 | |

=== West Road Pictures ===
| Title | Years | Network | Notes |
|---|---|---|---|
| Blood | 2018–present | Channel 5/Virgin Media One | co-production with Element Pictures and All3Media International |
| Penance | 2020–present | Channel 5 | co-production with All3Media International and GPO Productions |
| Hollington Drive | 2021 | ITV | |

=== Raw TV ===
| Title | Network | Original running | Notes |
|---|---|---|---|
| Banged Up Abroad | Channel 5/National Geographic | 2006–present | |
| Gold Rush | Discovery Channel | 2010–present | |
| Heathrow: Britain's Busiest Airport | ITV | 2015–present | |
| Race for the White House | CNN | 2016–present | co-production with Trigger Street Productions |
| Harley and the Davidsons | Discovery Channel | 2016 | Miniseries; co-produced with John Goldwyn Productions |
| Gold Rush: White Water | Discovery Channel | 2018–present | |
| American Dynasties: The Kennedys | CNN | 2018 | |
| The Windsors: A Royal Dynasty | CNN | 2020 | |
| Stanley Tucci: Searching for Italy | CNN | 2021–present | |
| Rich & Shameless | TNT | 2022 | co-production with TNT Originals Inc. |
| The Most Hated Man on the Internet | Netflix | 2022 | |
| Trainwreck: Woodstock 99 | Netflix | 2022 | co-production with BBH Entertainment |

== Television films and specials ==
=== Lime Pictures ===
- Ingenious (2009)

==== Wise Owl Films ====
- Rock on, Tommy: The Bobby Ball Story (2020)
- Second Hand for 50 Grand (2021)
- Goodbye Brooklyn Nine Nine (2022)

=== South Pacific Pictures ===
- The Rogue Stallion (1990)
- Clarence (1990)
- Old Scores (1991)
- The Girl from Mars (1993)
- The Man Who Lost His Head (2007)

=== Optomen ===
- Feral Families (2017)
- A&E Live (2018)
- The Parachute Murder Plot (2018)
- Sarah Payne: The Untold Story (2019)
- Hatton Garden: The Inside Story (2019)
- Page Three: The Naked Truth (2020)
- Sort Out Your Life (2021)
- The Real Manhunt, The Night Stalker (2021)

=== Objective Media Group ===
- Kookyville (2012)
- The Falkirk Cowboys (2019) (as Objective Media Group Scotland) (co-production with BBC Scotland)

==== Story Films ====
- The Cure (2019)
- NHS Heroes: Fighting to Save Our Lives (2020)

==== Objective Fiction ====
- Eric, Ernie and Me (2017)

=== North One Television ===
- Britain's Biggest Brood (2003)
- The Curse of Noel Edmonds (2004)
- Britain's 50 Greatest Comedy Sketches (2005)
- It's Not Easy Being a Wolf Boy (2005)
- My 100,000 Lovers (2005)
- The World's Greatest Actor (2006)
- The Perfect Vagina (2008)
- The 100 Greatest World Cup Moments of All Time! (2010)
- Stephen Fry's 100 Greatest Gadgets (2011)
- Britain's Favourite Christmas Songs (2011)
- Unforgettable: The Sweeney (2012)
- From Romania to Love (2013)
- 80's The Best of Bad TV (2015)
- When Celebrites Go Pop (2016)
- The Barbara Windsor Story (2017)
- Guy Martin WW1 Tank (2017)
- The Big Fat Lies About Diet & Exercise (2019)
- Shopping for a New Penis (2020)
- Falklands War: The Forgotten Battle (2022)

=== Lion Television ===
- Dickens in America (2005)
- The First Emperor: The Man Who Made China (2006)
- Daniel Libeskind: The Making of an Architect (2007)
- Egypt's Lost Queens (2014)
- Offended by Irvine Welsh (2020)
- Being Mum with MND (2022)

=== Company Pictures ===
- A Room for Romeo Brass (1999)
- Tom Brown's Schooldays (2005)
- Mansfield Park (2007)
- Who Gets the Dog? (2007)

== See also ==
- Surviving Paradise
