= Lingo (surname) =

The Scottish surname Lingo is derived from the lands of Lingoch in the parish of Carnbee, Fife, Scotland. The earliest known recorded use of the surname in Scotland is by Ulf de Lingoch, who witnessed a charter granted in the early 13th century.

The Lingo estate lands, located on Ling Burn near the village of Carnbee in the East Neuk of Fife, northwest of Pittenweem, belonged to the Monastery of Pittenweem prior to 1534, and were partly in possession of the Borthwicks of Lingo from 1534 until 1671, after which date they were held by the Hamiltons of Kilbrackmont until 1739, when they were purchased by Thomas Dalyell, a descendant of the Dalyells of Binns; in 1895 they were held by Ralph Dalyell, Esquire.

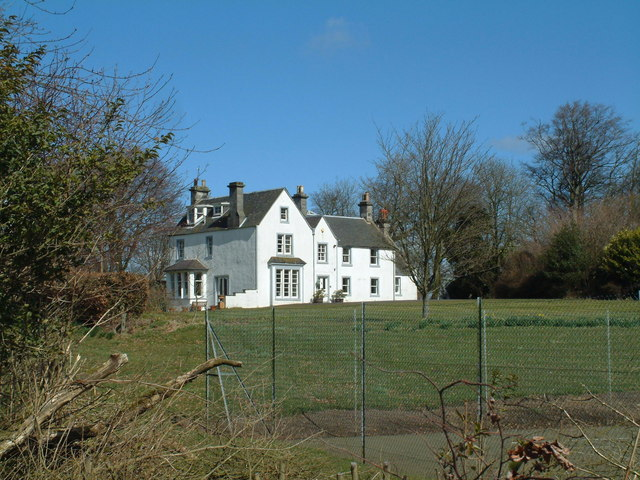
Lingo House

Lingo House, the seat of the ancient estate, is located about halfway between St. Andrews and Pittenweem, situated about a mile to the north of the B940 road, approximately 2 miles east of its junction with the A915 (St. Andrews to Largo). An 1893 advertisement offering Lingo House for lease published in The [Glasgow] Herald newspaper described the house as lying within 4 miles of Mount Melville railway station and about 6 miles from St. Andrews, containing a dining room, drawing room, business room, four bedrooms, two dressing rooms, a kitchen, scullery, and servants' accommodation, with stables, a coach-house, and a large garden on the grounds. Lingo House at Historic Environment Scotland

The first element of the name may be from Scottish Gaelic ling- 'leap, rush', possibly referring to the rapid Lathockar Burn on Lingo's northwest boundary and with a large waterfall in its course. It may otherwise be a rare loan word from Scots into Gaelic, ling 'heather'. The second element is the Gaelic place name suffix -och, generally -ach in modern Gaelic and commonly reduced to -o in Fife place names. Down through the centuries, the ancient pronunciation and spelling of Lingoch was shortened to Lingo, and that form has been in use since at least the 17th century, with some variations. The surname is occasionally found spelled Lingoe and Lingow, and has at times been confused with Ling, Linge, and Lingon.

The Lingo surname is included in a list of septs of Clan Graham provided by the 7th Duke of Montrose, late Chief of all the Grahams. Enquiry of the Chief was made, but to date no explanation has been forthcoming for how the surname came to be on the list. Perhaps the Grahams at some time held the Lingoch estate, and thus the family residing on the estate came under the influence of Clan Graham and was deemed a sept. A Graham clan history states that Lingo is a cadet line of the Grahams of Knockdolian in Carrick descended from Walter, youngest son of Sir William de Graham and the Princess Mary, daughter of Robert III, but does not provide other details. Other origins have been conjectured for this surname, including Italian by way of Ireland, and French, but no other origin has been satisfactorily documented, and the presence of Lingoes in America long before the American Revolution, their close alliance with settlers of predominantly British stock, and the frequent bestowal of such archetypal Scottish names as James Stuart Lingo, strongly suggest that some, at least, of the American Lingo families were of British origin.

The earliest certain record of the Lingo surname in the New World that has been documented is that of Elizabeth Lingoe marrying Edwards Dunstan on 12 May 1661 in Hungar's Parish in Northampton County, Virginia, on the southern part of the Delaware, Maryland, Virginia ("DelMarVa") peninsula. A number of Lingo families lived on the Delmarva Peninsula in the early colonial period, and Lingoes were in that county at least through 1733. In the early 19th century, several Lingo families migrated westward into Ohio and southward into the Carolinas, Georgia, Tennessee, Arkansas, Illinois, Iowa and Missouri, and eventually further out, and descendants are now found across the United States.

== People with the surname ==
- Albert J. Lingo, Alabama Highway Patrolman and Director of the Alabama Department of Public Safety 1963-1965
- Edward H. Lingo, Texas and Southwest U.S. lumberman
- George A. Lingo, Alaska pioneer
- Hayden W. Lingo, One Pocket billiards game inventor
- Jane Tunstall Lingo, Washington D.C. journalist, university administrator, socialite
- John Lingo, Vicar of St. Hilary from aft. 1554 through ca. 1560/1
- T. D. A. Lingo, WWII veteran, folk singer, radio personality, and brain researcher
- Walter H. Lingo, American dog breeder and NFL team owner
