= Heavy Young Heathens =

American film composers

- Origin: Los Angeles, California, United States
- Genres: Film score; Film trailers; Television score
- Years active: 2008-present
- Members: Aron Mardo; Robert Mardo
- Website: www.heavyyoungheathens.com

Heavy Young Heathens are American film, film trailer, and television composers, consisting of brothers Aron and Robert Mardo. They are known for their work composing and performing music for television series including Big Sky, Eastbound & Down, The Simpsons, The Righteous Gemstones, and Dead to Me. They have also composed music for films such as Halloween, Don Verdean, Rules Don't Apply, Yoga Hosers, and Masterminds. Heavy Young Heathens co-composed and perform "Being Evil Has a Price", the main theme to the popular Netflix series Lucifer. Most recently, Heavy Young Heathens composed and perform the original song "Psalm 28.7" for the first episode of The Righteous Gemstones second season. In the scene, Eric Andre and Jessica Lowe are seen performing the song in front of their Texas Megachurch congregation as Lyle and Lindy Lissons.

== History ==
Heavy Young Heathens released their self-titled debut on September 1, 2009. It hit the FMQB Top 5 on the album chart, and the single "Sha La La La La" charted at No. 16 on FMQB.

Their second EP, Make Room For The Youth, was released April 2010, debuting Top 5 on the FMQB Specialty Radio Charts and Top 20 on the Mediaguide Radio Charts.

During the 2022 winter Olympics, U.S. skating pair Alexa Knierim and Brandon Frazier used the duo's cover of "House of the Rising Sun" in their performance. The musicians sued both athletes and NBC, the broadcaster, for alleged unauthorized use. The case was settled the following July and caused the ISU to begin development of systems to aid skaters in navigating copyright law.

== Discography ==
- Heavy Young Heathens (2009)
- Make Room for the Youth (2010)
- Don Verdean Original Soundtrack (2015)
- Cold Dark City (2016)
- The Righteous (2022)

== Film ==
- Finestkind (2023)
- REFUGEE (2020)
- Reversal Of Fortune (2020)
- Halloween (2018 film) (2018)
- Low Low (2018)
- Rules Don't Apply (2016)
- Masterminds (2016)
- Yoga Hosers (2016)
- Mother's Day (2016)
- Don Verdean (2015)
- Hitman: Agent 47 (2015)
- Supermensch: The Legend of Shep Gordon (2013)
- Nitro Circus: The Movie (2012)

=== Film Trailers ===
- Runt (2020)
- Angry Birds 2 (2019)
- Hotel Artemis (2018)
- Kingsman: The Golden Circle (2017)
- True Memoirs of an International Assassin (2016)
- The Magnificent Seven (2016)
- Deadpool (2016)
- Hardcore Henry (2015)
- Ant-Man (2015)
- The Man from U.N.C.L.E. (2015)
- Get on Up (2014)
- The Amazing Spider-Man 2 (2014)
- Need for Speed (2014)
- Horns (2013)
- Hansel & Gretel: Witch Hunters (2013)
- The Amazing Spider-Man (2012)
- The Expendables 2 (2012)
- Real Steel (2011)
- Johnny English Reborn (2011)
- Underground Comedy
- TNT's Dallas (2012)
- The Rum Diary (2011)
- Footloose (2011)
- The Treasure of Kasban Lake

== Television ==
=== Theme songs ===
- Lucifer (2016–2021)
- Slednecks (2014)
- Are You the One?
- Ain't That America (2013)
- Buckwild (2013)
- The Wanted Life (2013)
- Warped Roadies (2012)
- Punk'd
- Ultimate Parkour Challenge (2009)
- Hillbillies for Hire

=== Featured music ===
- The Simpsons
- Big Sky (American TV series)
- Dead to Me (TV series)
- The Righteous Gemstones
- Mr Inbetween
- Stumptown (TV series)
- Vinyl
- Rock and Roll Hall of Fame
- CSI
- CSI: Cyber
- Criminal Minds
- Criminal Minds: Beyond Borders
- Shameless
- Eastbound & Down
- Looking
- Married
- The Grinder
- The Mindy Project
- 90210
- Inside the NFL
- Ringer
- Revenge
- Do No Harm
- The Emmys
- Jersey Shore
- Teen Wolf
- Punk'd (Season 9)
- Warped Roadies (Season 1)
- Ridiculousness
- Fantasy Factory
- Loiter Squad
- Death Valley
- Teen Mom
- 16 and Pregnant
- Repo Games
- World of Jenks
- The Inbetweeners
- Good Vibes
- Underemployed
- Zach Stone is Going to Be Famous
- Friendzone
- The Wanted Life
- Nightwatch
- Wahlburgers
- Smerconish
- Q with Jian Ghomeshi
- 30 for 30

=== Commercials ===
- Fiat
- Starbucks "Morning Routine" (2017)
- Land Rover
- Chrysler
- Dodge
- Ford
- Kawasaki motorcycles
- Bacardi
- Actionshot Camera
- GoPro
- Adidas
- Vans
- Red Bull
- Monster Energy
- UEFA European Championship

== Video games ==
The song "Sha La La La La" is featured in the 2011 video game Saints Row: The Third, in music station 89.0 Generation X's track list.
