= Michael K. Obeng =

Ghanaian plastic surgeon based in Beverly Hills, California, US

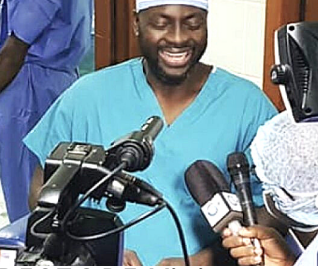
- Obeng being interviewed after a successful reconstructive surgery
- Born: 1973 (age 52–53); Ghana
- Education: Midwestern State University (BA); University of Texas Medical Branch (MD)
- Occupations: Plastic surgeon Health Consultant
- Years active: 2006-present
- Organization(s): MIKO Plastic Surgery; Global Health Solutions; RESTORE WORLDWIDE - THE FOUNDATION FOR RECONSTRUCTIVE SURGERY; Cedars Sinai Medical Center
- Awards: NAACP Humanitarian Award

Michael K. Obeng (born 1973) is a Ghanaian plastic surgeon. He is the director of MiKO Plastic Surgery and MiKO Surgery Centre.

== Early life and education ==
Obeng was born in Ghana in 1973. He completed his high school at Prempeh College, a boy's educational institution in Kumasi. He served as a dining hall prefect in his final year at his school. When he was 15, he met medical professionals from Operation Smile.

He obtained his undergrad degree from Midwestern State University in Wichita Falls, Texas, after he moved to the United States. He obtained B.S. degree in chemistry and received his M.D. degree from the University of Texas Medical Branch. He received a fellowship at Harvard Medical School, specializing in hand, wrist, and micro neurovascular surgery. Obeng gave the commencement address at his alma mater Midwestern State University, in 2016.

== Career ==
Obeng is a Ghanaian plastic surgeon and is the Director of MiKO Plastic Surgery and MiKO Surgery Centre in Beverly Hills.

Obeng came under the spotlight after provided free treatment to Tessica Brown, a woman who had applied Gorilla Glue on her hair. He managed to remove it successfully.

In 2015, Obeng and his then wife, Veronika, participated in the E! reality television series Second Wives Club. In 2016, Obeng filed a lawsuit against E! and its parent company, NBCUniversal, seeking an injunction to bar the network from airing any episodes that include him and his children.

In 2018, Obeng made national headlines for successfully performing forehead reduction surgery. In 2019, he again made headlines for successfully performing rib removal surgery on Justin Jedlica and has served as plastic surgery consultant for a variety of print and television publications, such as the Inquisitr regarding socialite Kim Kardashian's changes in facial structure throughout her career.

In 2020, Obeng and his surgery center were sued by a patient for posting nude photos of her on social media without consent. A $600,000 judgment was entered against Obeng for invasion of privacy and violation of the Confidentiality of Medical Information Act, breach of fiduciary duty, negligence per se and misappropriation of likeness. Obeng appealed the judgment but it was affirmed by the California Court of Appeal in May 2023. The patient's lawyer noted that "Dr. Obeng's actions were egregious violations of our client's privacy rights. Using private information, obtained while providing medical care, to promote the doctor's business on social media cannot be tolerated."

=== Recognition ===
The media recognized Obeng for his successful forehead reduction surgery in 2018. He was also recognized for successfully performing rib removal surgery in 2019. He has served as a plastic surgery consultant for the Inquisitr regarding Kim Kardashian's changes in facial structure.

He was awarded the NAACP Humanitarian Award for his services with R.E.S.T.O.R.E.,. He was also included in the 2020 Ebony Power 100 List 2020. He was also rated twice among America's top plastic surgeons by the Consumer Research Council.

== Philanthropy ==
In 2008, Obeng started the non-profit R.E.S.T.O.R.E., which provides free reconstructive surgery and medical services to children and adults in African countries with disfiguring deformities from birth, accidents, and diseases. R.E.S.T.O.R.E. has successfully completed over 500 surgeries since its inception. He has donated more than $300,000 to this cause.

In 2013, Obeng won the NAACP Humanitarian Award for his work with R.E.S.T.O.R.E., alongside Vanessa Williams, Loretta Devine, and Maxine Anderson. In 2020, he was included in the 2020 Ebony Power 100 List.

== Publications ==
- Agbenorku, Pius; Agamah, Gospel; Agbenorku, Manolo; Obeng, Mike (2012-02-01). "Reduction Mammaplasty in a Developing Country: A Guideline for Plastic Surgeons for Patient Selection". Aesthetic Plastic Surgery. 36 (1): 91–96. doi:10.1007/s00266-011-9750-8. ISSN 1432-5241. PMC 3291834. PMID 21614656.

== Personal life ==
Obeng was married to his third wife, Veronika, but the marriage ended. He also participated in the E! reality television series Second Wives Club with her, but he unsuccessfully tried to prohibit airing of any episodes that showed him and his children. For this, he filed a lawsuit against NBC Universal.

In 2021, Obeng appeared on the TLC reality series 90 Day Fiancé as a plastic surgeon to one of the show's co-stars, Angela Deem.
