= List of programs broadcast by ABC Spark =

This is a list of current and former television series broadcast by ABC Spark, a specialty channel based on the U.S. cable channel Freeform.

== Final programming ==
=== Original shows from Freeform ===
- The Fosters
- Melissa & Joey

=== Syndicated ===
- American Housewife
- Fresh Off the Boat
- Life in Pieces
- Mr. D
- Rules of Engagement

== Former programming ==
=== Acquired from Freeform ===
- 10 Things I Hate About You
- Baby Daddy
- Becoming Us
- Beverly Hills Nannies
- Beyond
- The Bold Type
- Bunheads
- Chasing Life
- Cheer Squad
- Cloak & Dagger
- Dancing Fools
- Dead of Summer
- Everything's Gonna Be Okay
- Fallen
- Good Trouble
- Greek
- Grown-ish
- Freak Out
- Huge
- Jane by Design
- Job or No Job
- Kevin from Work
- Lincoln Heights
- Love Trip: Paris
- The Lying Game
- The Middleman
- Make It or Break It
- Monica the Medium
- Motherland: Fort Salem
- Mystery Girls
- Next Step Realty: NYC
- The Nine Lives of Chloe King
- Party of Five
- Praise Petey
- Recovery Road
- Roommates
- The Secret Life of the American Teenager
- Siren
- Startup U
- State of Georgia
- Stitchers
- Switched at Birth
- Truth & Iliza
- Twisted
- The Vineyard
- The Watchful Eye
- Young & Hungry

=== Other acquired programming ===
- 8 Simple Rules
- America's Funniest Home Videos (Season 11-25)
- Beauty and the Beast
- Boy Meets World
- Black-ish
- Bless this Mess
- Blossom
- Cache Craze
- Cash Mob
- Celebrity Damage Control
- Celebrity Legacies
- Charmed
- Come Date With Me
- Criminal Minds: Suspect Behavior
- Da Vinci's Inquest
- Deal with It
- Degrassi: The Next Generation
- ER Vets
- Everybody Hates Chris
- Extreme Babysitting
- Extreme Makeover: Home Edition
- Extra
- Family Matters
- Full House
- The Funny Pit
- Ghost Whisperer
- The Hardy Boys
- Happy Endings
- Home Improvement
- How to Be Indie
- Jamie Oliver's Food Revolution
- Just for Laughs Gags
- Kaya
- Last Man Standing
- Less than Perfect
- Life with Boys
- Lizzie McGuire
- Love Trap
- Lady Jewelpet
- Malibu Country
- Man with a Plan
- The Middle
- Mr. Young
- My House Your Money
- My Wife and Kids
- Mysterious Ways
- Mystery Hunters
- Nancy Drew
- One of Us Is Lying
- Open Heart
- Pet Heroes
- Pick a Puppy
- Princess
- Private Eyes
- Ransom
- Reign
- Rookie Blue
- Ride
- Say Yes to the Dress Canada
- Scrubs
- Shannon and Sophie
- Smallville
- Splatalot!
- Student Bodies
- Supernatural
- That's So Raven
- That's So Weird!
- Trophy Wife
- Ugly Betty
- Undercover High
- The Vampire Diaries
- Wheels That Fail
- Wipeout
- Wipeout Canada
- Working the Engels
