= Victoria Cilliers =

Skydiver and attempted murder victim

Victoria Cilliers is a British skydiver, notable for having survived a murder attempt in 2015, when her husband interfered with both her main and reserve parachutes.

== Early life and marriage ==
Victoria lives in Wiltshire, England, and is a physiotherapist for the Ministry of Defence.

Victoria's ex-husband Emile Cilliers was born in South Africa in 1980 and moved to the UK in the early 2000s. He has four children from previous relationships. He met Victoria in 2009, and they have two children. Their relationship deteriorated before his 2015 attempt on her life.

She became a successful parachutist and instructor, with 2,654 jumps.

== Murder attempt ==
During a parachute jump on Easter Sunday 2015, both her main and reserve parachutes failed to open. She fell 4,000 ft (1,200 m) to the ground. She survived the fall despite life-threatening injuries because she landed on a soft, newly ploughed field. It was the second attempt on her life in less than a week.

Emile Cilliers was convicted of her attempted murder in May 2018 after a previous trial failed to reach a verdict. He was sentenced to life imprisonment with a minimum term of 18 years. He was also convicted of tampering with a gas valve at their home.

== Media ==
- I Survived is an autobiographical memoir published by Pan Macmillan
- The Parachute Murder Plot is a 2018 documentary film by All3Media about the murder attempt, with Fiona Bruce
- The Fall: Skydive Murder Plot is a 2024 Channel 4 television documentary about the murder attempt (originally commissioned as The Woman Who Fell To Earth)

== See also ==
- Malfunction (parachuting)
- Netheravon Airfield
- Death of Stephen Hilder, in a parachute incident in 2003
- Parachute Murder, a 2010 Belgian love triangle skydiving murder case
