= Travel Man =

British television travel documentary series

- Genre: Special interest Travel
- Presented by: Richard Ayoade (1–9); Joe Lycett (10–13)
- Theme music composer: Paul Mottram
- Opening theme: Trailblazer
- Country of origin: United Kingdom
- Original language: English
- No. of series: 13
- No. of episodes: 57

Production
- Running time: 30–60 minutes
- Production company: North One Television

Original release
- Network: Channel 4
- Release: 30 March 2015 – 31 January 2025

Related
- Gadget Man

Travel Man (also advertised as Travel Man: 48 Hours in...) is a British television travel documentary series, presented by Richard Ayoade and, since Series 10, Joe Lycett.

== Description ==
The programme focuses on the presenter travelling to a popular city in each episode, accompanied by a celebrity guest, to provide viewers a potential itinerary for a two-day (48-hour) break. The series is characterised by a fast-paced format, consumer advice and light humour.

In July 2019, Channel 4 announced that sardonic Richard Ayoade would be leaving the show after the ninth series and would be replaced as host by comedian Joe Lycett. His first episode was broadcast on 27 December 2021.

It is produced by North One Television for Channel 4.

It is broadcast on SBS Television and SBS On Demand in Australia.

In September 2026, it was annouced the show has reportely been cancelled after 10 years.

== Accolades ==
The programme has been twice nominated in the Best Features category at the BAFTAs and won Best Factual Programme three years running at the RTS Midlands awards.

== Transmissions ==
Series	Episodes	Originally released	
Series	Episodes	First released	Last released
1	4	30 March 2015	20 April 2015
2	8	5 January 2016	15 April 2016
3	5	23 September 2016	14 October 2016
4	4	6 March 2017	3 April 2017
5	5	20 October 2017	10 November 2017
6	4	2 April 2018	23 April 2018
7	5	10 September 2018	1 October 2018
8	4	15 April 2019	6 May 2019
9	4	21 October 2019	11 November 2019
10	5	27 December 2021	25 April 2022
11	5	29 December 2022	3 February 2023
12	4	8 March 2024	
13	4	10 January 2025	31 January 2025

== Episodes ==
=== Series 1 ===
No. overall	No. in series	Title	Guest	Original release date	Viewers (millions)
1	1	"48 Hours in Barcelona"	Kathy Burke	30 March 2015	1.7
Richard Ayoade and actress Kathy Burke go to Spain's second-largest city in 48 hours, including some far-out cuisine, Cava tasting, a guided tricycle tour, and surrealist artist Miró.
2	2	"48 Hours in Istanbul"	Adam Hills	6 April 2015	1.36
Ayoade and comedian Adam Hills embark on a whirlwind visit in Turkey's largest city, including a boat trip, a massage, a very close shave, and some haggling at the Grand Bazaar.
3	3	"48 Hours in Iceland"	Jessica Hynes	13 April 2015	1.67
Ayoade takes actress Jessica Hynes on a whirlwind weekend away to the stunning scenery of Iceland, for waterfalls, geysers, whales, rotten shark, and elf school.
4	4	"48 Hours in Marrakesh"	Stephen Mangan	20 April 2015	1.33
Ayoade and actor Stephen Mangan go hot air ballooning and camel riding on a quickie weekend trip in Morocco. Ayoade watches Mangan eat steamed sheep's head.

=== Series 2 ===
No. overall	No. in series	Title	Guest	Original release date	Viewers (millions)
5	1	"48 Hours in Vienna"	Chris O'Dowd	5 January 2016	2.15
Richard goes to the Austrian capital with comedian Chris O'Dowd to sample the sausages, cakes, wines, and spirits. The pair also take a hot-rod tour, visit a fairground, the Freud museum, and the city sewers.
6	2	"48 Hours in Paris"	Mel Giedroyc	12 January 2016	1.9
Ayoade and comedienne Mel Giedroyc do a le weekend in the French capital, with snails, absinthe, a Cordon Bleu cookery course, bespoke perfume, and an art tour.
7	3	"48 Hours in Copenhagen"	Noel Fielding	19 January 2016	1.86
Ayoade and comedian Noel Fielding spend 48 fast and funny hours in the Danish capital, with cycling, sightseeing, art, sandwiches, beer, and rollercoasters.
8	4	"48 Hours in Moscow"	Greg Davies	26 January 2016	1.76
Ayoade and comedian Greg Davies attempt to extract the essence of the Russian capital in two days, as they clash with army tanks, head into space, and visit one of the strangest circuses in the world.
9	5	"48 Hours in Seville"	Rob Delaney	25 March 2016	1.54
Ayoade heads to southern Spain with comedian Rob Delaney, where they eat tapas, learn to dance flamenco, and go a bit Wild West.
10	6	"48 Hours in Venice"	Jo Brand	1 April 2016	1.53
Ayoade and comedienne Jo Brand do a fast, funny and ruthlessly efficient trip to Venice, learning to row a gondola, sampling Venetian tapas, and staying at the Hotel Danieli.
11	7	"48 Hours in Dubai"	Johnny Vegas	8 April 2016	1.83
Ayoade stretches the description minibreak to the limit as he heads to the United Arab Emirates for a luxury bonanza with comedian Johnny Vegas.
12	8	"48 Hours in Berlin"	Roisin Conaty	15 April 2016	1.47
Ayoade heads for the German capital with comedienne Roisin Conaty, taking in the city's nightlife, Checkpoint Charlie, fancy food, and a replica Cold War apartment.

=== Series 3 ===
No. overall	No. in series	Title	Guest	Original release date	Viewers (millions)
13	1	"48 Hours in New York"	Katherine Ryan	23 September 2016	1.75
Ayoade and comedienne Katherine Ryan take a fast and funny trip to the US' largest city. Their overflowing schedule includes skyscrapers, rollerblades, museums, ferries, showtunes and cronuts.
14	2	"48 Hours in Helsinki"	Paul Rudd	30 September 2016	1.58
Hollywood actor Paul Rudd joins Ayoade to discover Finland's capital, with a time-efficient exploration by kayak, a good steaming in the city's saunas, and salty sweets.
15	3	"48 Hours in Lisbon"	Adam Buxton	7 October 2016	1.75
Actor and comedian Adam Buxton joins Ayoade for a high-speed tour of Portugal's capital, with trams, rickshaw, funicular and fado, and a visit to a doll hospital.
16	4	"48 Hours in Naples"	Jack Dee	14 October 2016	1.85
Ayoade and comedian Jack Dee take a trip to Southern Italy's largest city, featuring humour, history, culture, pizza, Vespas and chaotic traffic, a trip to Capri, and a guide to the meaning of dreams.
Christmas special
17	5	"48 Hours in Florence"	Rebel Wilson	25 December 2016	2.10
Actress Rebel Wilson joins Ayoade for a fun-packed whizz round Tuscany's largest city in a minibreak mixing art, action, gelato, a drive in a classic Alfa Romeo, and some tripe.

=== Series 4 ===
No. overall	No. in series	Title	Guest	Original release date	Viewers (millions)
18	1	"48 Hours in Saint Petersburg"	Rob Beckett	6 March 2017	1.73
Comedian Rob Beckett joins Ayoade in Russia's cultural capital, for a post-Soviet itinerary including a tank, caviar, vodka, and a herring in a fur coat.
19	2	"48 Hours in Budapest"	Aisling Bea	20 March 2017	2.02
Ayoade and comedienne Aisling Bea make a whirlwind tour of Hungary's capital, with selfies, goulash, cake, pubs, liquor, and a game of chess at the thermal baths.
20	3	"48 Hours in Tenerife"	Lena Dunham	27 March 2017	2.34
Ayoade and actress Lena Dunham fast forward through Tenerife, with a visit to a volcano, some stargazing, a sculpture tour, layered coffee, a spot of golf, and a whale hunt.
21	4	"48 Hours in Miami"	Rhod Gilbert	3 April 2017	1.88
Ayoade and comedian Rhod Gilbert's high-speed visit to South Florida's largest city takes in art, art deco, alligators, speedboats, an airboat tour of the everglades - and dominoes.

=== Series 5 ===
No. overall	No. in series	Title	Guest	Original release date	Viewers (millions)
22	1	"48 Hours in Rome"	Matt Lucas	20 October 2017	2.20
Ayoade is joined by comedian Matt Lucas, for a frenetic 48 hours in the Italian capital. They cram in culture, cuisine, history, hats and as many sights as possible.
23	2	"48 Hours in Valencia"	Sara Pascoe	27 October 2017	2.12
Ayoade and comedienne Sara Pascoe visit Spain's third-largest city for paella, cocktails, zorbing, a four-wheel bike ride and a hunt for the holy grail.
24	3	"48 Hours in Amsterdam"	Joe Lycett	3 November 2017	2.55
Ayoade and comedian Joe Lycett head to the Dutch capital for culture, cardio, canals, cuisine, drawing, Dutch gin, and the museum of street organs.
25	4	"48 Hours in Stockholm"	Sally Phillips	10 November 2017	2.27
Ayoade and actress Sally Phillips visit the Swedish capital for fika, meatballs, scaling high rooftops, singing ABBA, and staying up late playing on their phones.
Christmas Special
26	5	"48 Hours in Hong Kong"	Jon Hamm	26 December 2017	2.07
In an hour-long Christmas episode, Ayoade and actor Jon Hamm tour Hong Kong, taking in a tai chi drop-in session, a ride in a chopper, and fusion dim sum.

=== Series 6 ===
No. overall	No. in series	Title	Guest	Original release date	Viewers (millions)
27	1	"48 Hours in Brussels"	Lee Mack	2 April 2018	2.14
Richard brings inspiration to all mini-breakers as he heads to Belgium with comedian Lee Mack, for culture, comics, puppets, waffles, mussels, and pralines.
28	2	"48 Hours in Oslo"	Fay Ripley	9 April 2018	1.95
Richard heads to Norway with actor Fay Ripley for two days of sledging, screaming, skiing, sculpture, and scoff.
29	3	"48 Hours in Madeira"	Robert Webb	16 April 2018	2.31
Richard heads to the Portuguese island with actor/writer Robert Webb, for two days of wine, cake, fish, bananas, cable cars, and embroidery lessons.
30	4	"48 Hours on the Cote d'Azur"	Shazia Mirza	23 April 2018	2.10
Shazia Mirza joins Richard Ayoade for a two day detour in the south of France, including blue art, fancy yachts, a glam helicopter ride, and a trip to the casino in Monaco.

=== Series 7 ===
No. overall	No. in series	Title	Guest	Original release date	Viewers (millions)
31	1	"48 Hours in Zurich"	Frank Skinner	10 September 2018	1.94
Richard Ayoade returns, delivering the definitive guide to a minibreak in Switzerland's largest city. Joining him for fondue, hot chocolate, Dada, and footie is Frank Skinner.
32	2	"48 Hours in Ibiza"	Jessica Knappett	17 September 2018	1.82
Richard and comic actor Jessica Knappett tour the White Isle of the Med - taking in some alfresco art, deluxe cocktails, an exclusive supper club, and a hippy gong bath.
33	3	"48 Hours in Ljubljana"	Eddie Izzard	24 September 2018	1.77
Richard and Eddie Izzard take in lovely Ljubljana; local tapas and orange wine; and make a trip to the stunningly beautiful Lake Bled.
34	4	"48 Hours in Milan"	Morgana Robinson	1 October 2018	1.94
Richard and comedian Morgana Robinson tour a sweltering Milan, taking in paintings, a musical pasta-making lesson, and a drink in the smallest bar in the world.
Christmas Special
35	5	"96 Hours in Jordan"	David Baddiel	27 December 2018	1.95
Comedian David Baddiel joins Richard Ayoade for a seasonal minibreak, visiting world-class wonders, jaw-dropping deserts and over-salted seas, as they follow in the footsteps of prophets and legends.

=== Series 8 ===
No. overall	No. in series	Title	Guest	Original release date	Viewers (millions)
36	1	"48 Hours in Athens"	Dawn French	15 April 2019	1.98
Comedy goddess Dawn French joins Richard in Athens for some ancient history, doughnuts, molecular food, ouzo, and a radical pedicure involving a toothless fish.
37	2	"48 Hours in Porto"	Nish Kumar	22 April 2019	1.86
Nish Kumar joins Richard for a potter round Porto. Their stuffed mini-break includes scooters, a tipple or two, a fat sandwich, pastries, confession, and some amazing views of Portugal's second city.
38	3	"48 Hours in Tallinn"	Alice Levine	29 April 2019	1.74
Richard and Alice Levine - DJ, broadcaster and podcaster - do Estonia's capital in 48 hours - including the most see-able sights, some nosh at its top restaurant, and a stroke of Sean Connery's face.
39	4	"48 Hours in Hamburg"	Bob Mortimer	6 May 2019	2.01
Richard Ayoade and Bob Mortimer go for a spin round cosmopolitan Hamburg. There's a Beatles tour in the red-light district, some local hash - corned beef - and hip cocktails.

=== Series 9 ===
No. overall	No. in series	Title	Guest	Original release date	Viewers (millions)
40	1	"48 Hours in Dubrovnik"	Stephen Merchant	21 October 2019	1.93
Ayoade does Dubrovnik with comedian Stephen Merchant, including a Game of Thrones tour, a buggy safari, and a ferry to the cursed island of Lokrum.
41	2	"48 Hours in Bergen"	Lou Sanders	28 October 2019	1.69
Ayoade and Lou Sanders do a two-day blast round Bergen, including a gastronomic adventure, Norway's fastest zipline, some odd architecture, and a live-action museum.
42	3	"48 Hours in Kraków"	Joe Wilkinson	4 November 2019	2.13
Ayoade and Joe Wilkinson whizz round the historic Polish city, stopping for some obwarzanek krakowski, local dumplings, art nouveau, vodka, salt mines, showcase socialist realism, and a bit of soldering.
43	4	"48 Hours in Madrid"	Ellie Taylor	11 November 2019	1.82
Comedian Ellie Taylor joins Ayoade for a two-day meander around Madrid, following an itinerary rich in art, history, histrionics, some vermouth, and plenty of ham.

=== Series 10 ===
No. overall	No. in series	Title	Guest	Original release date	Viewers (millions)
Christmas Special
44	1	"96 Hours in Iceland"	Bill Bailey	27 December 2021	2.30
The new Travel Man, Joe Lycett, whisks Bill Bailey off to Iceland, for alfresco bathing, volcanoes, Northern Lights, husky sledding and snowflake bread
45	2	"48 Hours in the Basque Country"	James Acaster	4 April 2022	N/A
New travel man Joe Lycett and James Acaster head to Bilbao to soak up the art and kalimotxos, and bask in the region's foodie capital, San Sebastián
46	3	"48 Hours in Split"	Aisling Bea	11 April 2022	N/A
Aisling Bea joins Joe in Split for some Croatian cooking, sunset paddleboarding, dog beach walking and a visit to Froggyland - a museum populated by hundreds of stuffed frogs!
47	4	"48 Hours in Cyprus"	Mo Gilligan	18 April 2022	N/A
Joe takes Mo Gilligan on a Cypriot odyssey where they get hands-on with halloumi, ride mushroom boats, visit the salt and pepper museum and sample a 24-carat gold ice lolly
48	5	"48 Hours in Antwerp"	Katherine Parkinson	25 April 2022	N/A
Joe and Katherine Parkinson explore Antwerp by hitting a golf ball around it, before they sample the local beer, have breakfast in a launderette and journey down into the subterranean tunnels

=== Series 11 ===
No. overall	No. in series	Title	Guest	Original release date	Viewers (millions)
Christmas Special
49	1	"96 Hours in Rio"	Stephen Mangan	29 December 2022	1.26
Joe Lycett and Stephen Mangan enjoy four festive days romping around Rio de Janeiro, in a supersized seasonal mini-break
50	2	"48 Hours in Vilnius"	Sarah Millican	13 January 2023	N/A
Sarah Millican joins Joe in the Lithuanian capital Vilnius, as they go hot air ballooning, sample cepelinai dumplings and gira, take a stroll round Užupis, visit Lukiškės Prison, and search for the geographical centre of Europe at Europos Parkas and Girija.
51	3	"48 Hours in Dublin"	Mawaan Rizwan	20 January 2023	N/A
Joe and comedian Mawaan Rizwan spend two days in Dublin, visiting talking statues, swimming in 'scrotum-tightening' waters at Forty Foot, swigging stout at the Guinness Storehouse, and marvelling at waxworks.
52	4	"48 Hours in Salzburg"	Roisin Conaty	27 January 2023	N/A
Joe and Roisin Conaty visit the fairy-tale city of Salzburg, where they enjoy a three-course meal on a horse and carriage tour, some forest-bathing, and a spot of musical cycling on the trail of The Sound of Music.
53	5	"48 Hours in Marseille"	Asim Chaudhry	3 February 2023	N/A
Asim Chaudhry joins Joe to spend le weekend in Marseille. Together they visit Hotel Le Corbusier, venture through an underwater museum, journey to Notre-Dame de la Garde and learn some tricks at a world-famous skatepark, before raising a glass of pastis.

=== Series 12 ===
No. overall	No. in series	Title	Guest	Original release date	Viewers (millions)
54	1	"48 Hours in Trieste"	Alan Davies	8 March 2024	N/A
Alan Davies joins Joe for a traverse around Trieste, where they shoot the breeze at the Wind Museum, enjoy food and fizz pairing in Prosecco, and pop over the Slovenian border to the Lipica Stud Farm.
55	2	"48 Hours in Rovaniemi"	Desiree Burch	8 March 2024	N/A
Desiree Burch joins Joe for some snow-filled shenanigans in Rovaniemi, Lapland. They have a crack at ice fishing and ride in a Sámi reindeer caravan, before sparking hope of seeing the Northern Lights.
56	3	"48 Hours in Prague"	Adam Buxton	8 March 2024	N/A
Adam Buxton and Joe peruse Prague's wonders as they kayak down the River Vltava, sample sausages out of skulls and caviar-laced ice cream, hop into a beer spa and ascend the Zizkov TV Tower.
57	4	"48 Hours in Lanzarote"	Jessica Fostekew	8 March 2024	N/A
Jessica Fostekew and Joe enjoy a Canarian caper in Lanzarote, as they trike through the lunar landscape, sample volcanic vino and cactus croquettes, and explore the Jameos del Agua lava tunnels.

=== Series 13 ===
No. overall	No. in series	Title	Guest	Original release date	Viewers (millions)
58	1	"48 Hours in Málaga"	David O'Doherty	10 January 2025	N/A
59	2	"48 Hours in Rotterdam"	Alex Brooker	17 January 2025	N/A
60	3	"48 Hours in Washington DC"	Phil Wang	24 January 2025	N/A
61	4	"48 Hours in Malmö"	Rose Matafeo	31 January 2025	N/A

== Home video ==
Travel Man Series 1 and 2 was released on DVD in October 2018.

== Related programmes ==
Travel Man was a spin-off from the Ayoade-presented North One/Channel 4 series Gadget Man, which was first broadcast with Stephen Fry as host in 2012. Since this series was first broadcast, the franchise has been expanded by Channel 4/North One to include new commission Hobby Man, with Alex Brooker from Channel 4's Friday night comedy show The Last Leg as the main presenter. Similar to Travel Man, the format features a main presenter with a different guest each week, but each episode of the new programme is an hour long, rather than half an hour. Channel 4 has commissioned a four-part Hobby Man series, with each episode exploring three different British hobbies. The guests for the series are Joe Wilkinson, Scarlett Moffatt, Joe Thomas and Andi Oliver.
