= Parachute Murder =

2006 murder in Belgium

The Parachute Murder is the name the Belgian media gave to the crime that led to a 2010 Belgian love triangle skydiving murder trial. The defendant, elementary school teacher and amateur skydiver Els "Babs" Clottemans, was found guilty of murder by sabotaging the parachutes of another woman, fellow skydiver Els Van Doren, because Van Doren was a rival for the love of Marcel Somers, also a skydiver.

== Victim ==
Els Van Doren was a 38-year-old mother of two, married to an Antwerp jeweller. Van Doren was an experienced skydiver who had performed 2,300 jumps prior to her death.

Van Doren and Els Clottemans, a 26-year-old school teacher, were friends. Since they both had the same first name, Van Doren at one point suggested that everyone in the skydiving club call her younger friend "Babs" so there would be less confusion.

One week before the murder, Van Doren spent the night with Marcel Somers in his bed at his house, along with Clottemans, who slept on the floor on a mattress downstairs. Unbeknownst to Van Doren, she was visiting Somers on Clottemans' customary night to be with him, as Van Doren was unaware of Somers' relationship with Clottemans.

== Crime ==
On 18 November 2006, 12 members of a skydiving club that included Van Doren, Somers, and Clottemans, flew over Flanders. Van Doren and Clottemans were supposed to link hands with Somers and another man in a skydiving quartet, then release hands and deploy the parachutes.

Van Doren died when, while falling, disengaged from the others, both her primary and reserve parachutes failed to deploy. The dive was captured by a video camera mounted on Van Doren's helmet. Van Doren dropped from a height of more than 2 miles (3.2 km) landing in a garden in the town of Opglabbeek. Police later established that the cords of the parachute had been cut.

== Case evidence ==
The prosecution offered almost no forensic evidence at trial, and case was entirely circumstantial, although part of the crime was filmed by Van Doren's own helmet camera. She is initially seen jumping from the plane with Clottemans, Somers, and another man, who all link hands in the air. When the quartet release hands at 4,500 ft. (about 1,400 m), Van Doren discovers that neither of her parachutes will deploy, and is seen wildly tugging at her straps, to no avail.

=== Motive ===
Clottemans became a suspect when she attempted suicide just before she was going to give a second statement to police, a month after the incident. Police later learned that both Van Doren and Clottemans had a sexual relationship with Somers. Investigators were not able to determine if Van Doren knew that Somers also had a relationship with Clottemans.

=== Opportunity ===
The prosecutors alleged that Clottemans had the opportunity to sabotage Van Doren's parachute the week before the fatal jump, when Clottemans, Van Doren, and Somers all spent the weekend at Somers' home, with Clottemans sleeping in the living room while the other two were in the bedroom. According to the allegation, Clottemans would have had the opportunity to cut Van Doren's parachute's lines, as the parachute was in the apartment, and experts estimated that it would have taken no more than 30 seconds to cut the lines with scissors. While normally the three would jump together to create a formation, during the jump in question, Clottemans stayed on the plane a few extra seconds and watched Van Doren's dive from above.

== Trial ==
Clottemans was charged and arrested in January 2007, then released on bail in 2008. Her trial began on 24 September 2010 with jury selection and ended on 20 October 2010 with a conviction. Media interest in the trial was so great that "a room next to the courthouse had to be used for journalists to follow the proceedings through remote video."

After the trial began, Clottemans, who maintained her innocence, was placed on suicide watch. On 22 October 2010, Clottemans was sentenced to 30 years' imprisonment. In sentencing her to 30 years rather than life, the judge took "her feeble psychological condition" as an extenuating circumstance.

=== Sentence ===
Clottemans appealed the verdict on the ground that she was interrogated by police without her attorney present. The appeal was denied in May 2011.

== See also ==
- Victoria Cilliers, skydiver who survived a murder attempt on her in 2015
- Death of Stephen Hilder, in a parachute incident in 2003
