= Paul Mottram =

Paul Mottram is a composer, arranger and orchestrator of music for film and television, and also writes production music for Audio Network.

Commissioned music credits include Bank Of Dave, Kirstie's Handmade Britain (Channel 4), Vic Reeves' Rogues Gallery (Discovery, BBC Three) and People Like Us (BBC Two). His music has also featured on numerous productions including the films Bad Santa, The Bee Movie and trailer for Woody Allen's Blue Jasmine and Amazon's Generation Wealth and television programmes such as The Apprentice, Panorama, Horizon, Newsnight, QI, Doctor Who, Who Do You Think You Are?, The Crown, The Restaurant, The Gadget Show, Coast, Hollyoaks, Travel Man, and Downton Abbey, and television commercials for Barclays, JVC, Pizza Hut, Rover, Renault, and Hitachi. His music also features prominently on some Youtube channels such as BuzzFeed and its affiliated channels, SortedFood, INSIDER and its affiliated channels, The Economist, and BBC Three.

After classically training as a violist, pianist and composer at Royal College of Music, Cambridge University and Guildhall School of Music and Drama, he was heavily involved in the restoration and re-recording of William Walton and Malcolm Arnold’s "lost" film scores of the 1940s and 1950s. He also worked as an orchestrator on films such as Shirley Temple, Chaplin and Rain Man, before specialising in composing. Between 1986 and 1990 he fronted the band The Dubious Brothers under the name Monty Von Dubious.

He is one of the founding shareholders in Audio Network PLC where he acts as a music consultant.

Some of his most successful pieces of music include 'Sideways Like a Crab'.
