= Hayden Lingo =

American billiards enthusiast

Hayden W. Lingo
- Born: February 28, 1907; Texas, US
- Died: January 28, 1973 (aged 65); Oklahoma City, Oklahoma, US
- Known for: Expert One Pocket billiards player

Hayden W. Lingo (1907–1973), often cited as "the man who invented the billiards game of One Pocket", was a prominent early proponent of the game, and a top player in the United States in the 1940s through the 1960s. His rules are said to be those adopted as the basis for the rules used in the first Jansco brothers' Johnston City One Pocket Tournament in 1961, and the first published rules for the modern game.

A resident of Oklahoma City, Oklahoma, Lingo travelled widely in pursuit of competition, as far afield as Boston, Massachusetts. Described as well-dressed and soft-spoken, he was said to be an unusually smart player, approaching One Pocket like a studious chess master approaches the game of chess, and a master of ball control, with a superior knowledge of the game.

In 1963, Lingo authored a pamphlet about the game of One Pocket that has been preserved in the Library of Congress. He was inducted into the One Pocket Hall of Fame in 2006.

== Personal ==
Born on March 28, 1907, in Texas, Lingo was brought by his parents to Oklahoma, where he married Marguerite Crowder on April 9, 1935, in Oklahoma City. He served in the US Army in World War II from April 1942 through October 1945. He died on January 28, 1973, in Oklahoma City, aged 65.
