= Death of Stephen Hilder =

2003 British parachuting death

Stephen Hilder
- Born: 12 December 1982; Hereford, Herefordshire, United Kingdom
- Died: 4 July 2003 (age 20); Hibaldstow Airfield, Lincolnshire, United Kingdom
- Cause of death: Parachute failure
- Known for: Unexplained death

The death of Stephen Hilder, aged 20, occurred on 4 July 2003 at Hibaldstow Airfield, England, in an incident in which Hilder fell 4,000 metres (13,000 ft) to his death when, during a 3-person team skydive, both his main and reserve parachutes failed. The investigation into the death, "unique in British crime history", revealed expert-level tampering with both canopies, but failed to determine whether the incident was murder or suicide.

== Background ==
Stephen Paul Hilder was born on 12 December 1982 in Hereford and attended the Bishop of Hereford's Bluecoat School. He was later an officer cadet at the Defence Academy of the United Kingdom in Shrivenham, Wiltshire, England. A keen parachutist, he died around 2:45 pm on Friday, 4 July 2003, at Hibaldstow Airfield, when both his main and reserve parachutes failed to operate correctly. He had been participating in a week-long British Collegiate Parachute Association championship skydiving competition with his "Black Rain" teammates and fellow officer cadets, Adrian Blair and David Mason (both aged 19), who had all made over 200 jumps each.

The unusual death quickly generated massive nationwide media interest. The reports of sabotage also had noticeable effects on the subsequent behaviour of parachutists at championship events in the UK, and resulted in an increase in the sales of secure bags and lockers for the storage of equipment. His funeral was held at St Mary's Church in Burghill, Herefordshire, on Thursday, 31 July 2003.

== Criminal investigation ==
Initially, due to cloudy conditions, the incident was not noticed as it happened, either by the team's videographer, his teammates, or observers on the ground. However, a disturbance in a nearby cornfield, where jumpers who missed the landing zone often ended up, was noticed, and the body was soon found. The Humberside Police were called and collected evidence from the body, alongside DNA samples from everyone present and visually inspecting all other parachutes on-site. They initially reported that his parachute had been sabotaged, with the risers (fabric connectors between the harness and lines) for his reserve parachute having been deliberately cut with a hook knife.

A 10-month search for a murderer with a motive ensued, including nationwide mail-outs to all British Parachute Association (BPA) members, a Crimewatch programme, and a full-page advertisement in the BPA magazine, Skydive. Blair and Mason were arrested in October 2003 and later released without charge, while a third man, who remained unnamed, was also arrested and subsequently released without charge.

Laboratory tests of the parachute straps revealed that fibres from the severed risers were present on Hilder's body, while DNA tests on the parachute straps revealed the presence of Hilder's DNA alone. The police concluded that Hilder had cut his own straps. This caused bafflement for both the police and Hilder's family and friends, who had seen no indication that Hilder was intending to die by suicide. One police officer stated that "Nothing we have discovered during the investigation and no one we have interviewed has said anything to suggest Stephen may have been contemplating killing himself."

=== Coroner's inquest ===
In March 2005, a coroner's inquest recorded an open verdict on the cause of Hilder's death. The inquest was also informed that at the time of his death, Hilder had money problems and was around £17,000 in debt (due to overspending related to skydiving), was close to the end of a casual relationship, and had wrongly assumed that he was failing his first-year academy exams. Other possibly related factors raised included his relatively recent conversion to Catholicism and his interest in a possible transfer to the navy.

On 25 March 2005, North Lincolnshire coroner Stewart Atkinson refused to accept that the death was a suicide after a forensic scientist testified that the lack of DNA could be attributable to a saboteur wearing gloves and that crucially, the presence of fibres from the severed risers on Hilder's body was of no evidential value, as transfer could have taken place in freefall or when the risers were subsequently removed in the field where Hilder landed. The forensic scientist was therefore unable to support any positive assertion that Hilder had been responsible for making the cuts. While a test on scissors found in the locked boot of Hilder's car demonstrated that they were the implement used to make the cuts, there was no further evidence of where the act had taken place or who may have used the scissors in question (given that the car keys had been left in the ignition). Atkinson also stated that there was no proof that someone else was responsible for cutting the risers.

== Similar incidents ==
One of the few leads that the police had when searching for a saboteur was an old issue of an American skydiving magazine, found at the drop zone, that reported one of the four other recorded cases of sabotaged parachutes in the history of skydiving. One well-known case was that of Cary Hopwood, an American skydiver who had survived a parachute failure in 1996 after borrowing one from a friend, world champion skydiver, Kirk Verner. A similar tampering event happened to Charlie Mullins in 1997, but the interference was noticed in a pre-jump check.

In October 2010, a 26-year-old Belgian elementary school teacher, Els Clottemans, was convicted of murder and sentenced to 30 years in jail for tampering with a love-triangle rival's parachute in exactly the same way as Hilder's in what was known as the "Parachute Murder". The victim, Els Van Doren, died in November 2006 in the town of Opglabbeek when both her parachutes failed.

In May 2015, at Netheravon Airfield, Hilder's regular dropzone, army Sgt. Emile Cilliers was arrested after being suspected of tampering with his wife Victoria's parachute. On 5 May, both his wife's parachutes had failed to operate correctly, but the reserve inflated enough to enable her to survive the 1,200-metre (4,000-foot) fall. In May 2018, he was found guilty of attempted murder in an attempt to receive a £120,000 life-insurance payment and to end his marriage to be with his lover.

== Media ==
The incident was covered by the BBC's Crimewatch in an episode aired on 24 July 2003, and by ITV Studios in a 2011 documentary titled Real Crime: Sky Diver Murder or Suicide? It was also covered by a July 2018 episode of Casefile True Crime Podcast.

== See also ==
- Malfunction (parachuting)
- Formation skydiving
