= Lingo =

Lingo, a contraction of language, often refers to jargon, but in a less formal or technical sense.

Lingo may also refer to:

== Technology ==
- Lingo (programming language), one of several unrelated programming languages
- Lingo (VoIP Service operator), a VoIP service provided by Primus Telecommunications Inc
- Trade name of the Linn Sondek LP12 turntable's power supply
- LINGO (mathematical modeling language), designed for formulating and solving optimization problems

== People ==
- Lingo (surname), a Scottish surname, including people with the name

== Places ==
- Lingo, Missouri, a community in Macon County
- Lingo, New Mexico, a populated place in Roosevelt County
- Lingo Creek, Delaware
- Lingo House, an estate house near Carnbee, Fife, Scotland

== Television game shows ==
- Lingo (American game show), an American television game show with multiple international adaptations that debuted in 1987
- Lingo (British game show), a short-lived UK game show produced from 1987 to 1988 and later revived in 2021
- Lingo (Canadian game show), a Canadian game show that aired on Radio-Canada in Quebec from 1998 to 2001
- Lingo (Dutch game show), Dutch television game show based on the North American format of the same name

== Other uses ==
- Lingo (album), by Gang Gajang
- Lingo, the title character of The Lingo Show, a kids' TV show
- Lingo, regional variant of Lingam, the phallic representation of the Hindu god Shiva

== See also ==
- Lingoes (program), multilingual translation software program
- Lingvo, the Esperanto word for language
- Linguo
