= Gadget Man =

British television series

- Genre: Special Interest
- Presented by: Stephen Fry (2012); Richard Ayoade (2013–15)
- Country of origin: United Kingdom
- Original language: English
- No. of series: 4
- No. of episodes: 25

Production
- Running time: 30 minutes (inc. adverts); 60 minutes (specials; inc. adverts)
- Production company: North One Television

Original release
- Network: Channel 4
- Release: 19 November 2012 – 22 June 2015

Related
- Travel Man; Hobby Man

Gadget Man (previously Stephen Fry: Gadget Man) is a British television series, which aired from 19 November 2012 to 22 June 2015 on Channel 4 and was presented by Stephen Fry in the first series and Richard Ayoade in the remaining three. Each episode presented a variety of innovative products related to the episode's theme. The series was mainly filmed in and around The Lime Works, a 1930s art deco converted water tower in Norton, Kent.

Since the Stephen Fry: Gadget Man series was first broadcast, the franchise has also been expanded by Channel 4/North One to include Travel Man with Ayoade and current presenter Joe Lycett, and new commission Hobby Man, with Alex Brooker from Channel 4's Friday-night comedy show The Last Leg.

== Episodes ==
=== Series overview ===
Series	Episodes	Originally aired	
Series	Episodes	Series premiere	Series finale
1	6	19 November 2012	24 December 2012
2	6	2 September 2013	7 October 2013
3	9	25 August 2014	22 December 2014
4	4	1 June 2015	22 June 2015

=== Series 1 (2012) ===
No. in series	Title	Original air date	Special guest(s)	Viewers (millions)
1	Super Commuter	19 November 2012	Jonathan Ross	2.03
2	Tasty Tech	26 November 2012	Derren Brown, Carol Vorderman and Jo Brand	1.3
3	Work Made Easy	3 December 2012	Alan Sugar	1.1
4	Fun and Games	10 December 2012	Jeremy Clarkson	1.21
5	Body Beautiful	17 December 2012	Amy Childs and Kelly Holmes	1.05
6	Christmas Special	24 December 2012		—N/a

=== Series 2 (2013) ===
No. in series	Title	Original air date	Special guest(s)	Viewers (millions)
1 (7)	The Great Outdoors	2 September 2013	Stephen Mangan and Benedict Allen	1.47
2 (8)	Rise and Shine	9 September 2013	Sara Cox and John Humphrys	1.38
3 (9)	Child's Play	16 September 2013	Hugh Dennis and Denise van Outen	1.02
4 (10)	Summer Holiday	23 September 2013	Noel Fielding	0.959
5 (11)	Home Improvement	30 September 2013	Andy Kane, Charlie Luxton and Anna Ryder Richardson	1.05
6 (12)	Smaller Is Better	7 October 2013	Galton Blackiston, Jimmy Carr and Alex James	1.11

=== Series 3 (2014) ===
No. in series	Title	Original air date	Special guest(s)	Viewers (millions)
1 (13)	Weather	25 August 2014	Marcus Brigstocke and Tim Vine	0.995
2 (14)	Public Transport	1 September 2014	Adam Buxton and Russell Howard	1.06
3 (15)	The Staycation	8 September 2014	Phill Jupitus	0.903
4 (16)	Shopping	15 September 2014	Jimmy Doherty and Alison Steadman	1.10
5 (17)	Self-Improvement	22 September 2014	Eamonn Holmes, Richard E. Grant and Dominic O'Brien	1.25
6 (18)	Staying In	29 September 2014	Seann Walsh and David Mitchell	1.04
7 (19)	Cooking and Dining Out	6 October 2014	Adrian Edmondson, Charlie Harry Francis and Dr Rachel Edwards-Stuart	1.03
8 (20)	Property	13 October 2014	Naomi Cleaver, Claudia Winkleman and Rupert Des Forges	0.910
9 (21)	Guide to Christmas	22 December 2014	Adam Hills, Jessica Hynes, Stephen Merchant, Jonathan Ross, Reece Shearsmith and Robert Webb	1.00

=== Series 4 (2015) ===
No. in series	Title	Original air date	Special guest(s)	Viewers (millions)
1 (22)	The Weekend	1 June 2015	Steve Jones, Al Murray and Sara Pascoe	TBA
2 (23)	9 to 5	8 June 2015	Dara Ó Briain and Grace Dent	TBA
3 (24)	Date Night	15 June 2015	Katherine Ryan, Tom Rosenthal and Sanjeev Bhaskar	TBA
4 (25)	Health and Safety	22 June 2015	Keith Allen and Bill Bailey	TBA
