= Tessica Brown =

American internet celebrity (born 1980)

- Born: October 20, 1980 (age 45); Violet, Louisiana
- Other name: Gorilla Glue Girl
- Occupation: Internet celebrity
- Years active: 2021–present
- Known for: Putting Gorilla Glue in her hair

Tessica Brown (born October 20, 1980), also known as the Gorilla Glue Girl, is an American Internet celebrity. She is best known for her TikTok videos in 2021 that documented the aftermath of her substituting hair spray with Gorilla Glue and putting the adhesive in her hair.

== Personal life ==
Tessica Brown was born on October 20, 1980, in Violet in St. Bernard Parish, Louisiana. Prior to February 2021, Brown worked as the owner of a day care center, Tessica's Little Angels, and a dance team, the Dazzling Divaz, and was the mother of five children. Brown got engaged to Dewitt Madison in June 2020 and announced her pregnancy with their first child together and her sixth overall in March 2021. Brown began dating Brymon Brocks in 2021, and the two got engaged in October 2023.

== Career ==
In February 2021, Brown posted a video to her social media accounts including TikTok and Instagram, where she goes by the username im_d_ollady, explaining that she had sprayed Gorilla Glue Spray Adhesive on her hair a month before and that her hair became stuck to her scalp. She applied the adhesive as hair spray, and the hair spray she typically used was called "Got2b Glued Blasting Freeze". The video went viral on TikTok, where it received over 24 million views by that month. Asia Milia Ware of Teen Vogue wrote that she had "all of social media invested [in her] hair journey" and Brown became known as the Gorilla Glue Girl online. Later that month, she posted a series of photos to her Instagram account of her at the St. Bernard Parish Hospital, where she was taken to the emergency room and a nurse attempted to use nail polish remover wipes and sterile water on her scalp, and a video of her attempting to remove the glue from her hair at home. Though the nurse said that it would be possible to remove but would take over 20 hours, Brown chose to go home and attempt to remove it herself and failed.

Gorilla Glue also tweeted that they were "very sorry to hear about the unfortunate incident that Miss Brown experienced". She soon got a call from Gina Rodriguez, a California-based executive producer and the owner of entertainment company GiToni Productions, who recommended her to Beverly Hills-based plastic surgeon Dr. Michael Obeng. Obeng performed a four-hour-long surgical procedure for free on her and applied a combination of aloe vera, medical-grade adhesive remover, olive oil, and a small amount of acetone, which successfully removed the adhesive from her hair. Rodriguez also became Brown's manager. She also received over $25,000 from crowdfunding on GoFundMe to get the glue removed. By mid-February, almost one and a half million posts had been made across social media about Brown. Avani Reyes, another social media user, also went viral later that month for claiming to have accidentally put Gorilla Glue in her hair, and was described by the New York Post as Brown's first copycat.

Brown launched Forever Hair, a line of haircare products, such as hair growth oil and hair spray, and merchandise with the slogan "Bonded for Life", in June 2021. She released her debut single as a rapper, "Ma Hair", in November 2021, which referenced and sampled her original viral video. In December 2021, she attempted to dye her hair after it started to grow back, causing it to fall out in clumps. She became a contestant on the 25th season, its "Viral Sensations" season, of Food Network's reality competition television series Worst Cooks in America in January 2023.

== In popular culture ==
Saturday Night Live referenced Brown in a sketch about two lawyers, played by Regina King and Kenan Thompson, pursuing a class-action lawsuit against Gorilla Glue due to people using it as a beauty product. Nicki Minaj also mentions Brown in the song "Fractions" from the reissue of her 2009 mixtape, Beam Me Up Scotty, released in May 2021.
