= Buckwild (TV series) =

American reality television series

- Shain, Anna, Katie, Salwa, Joey, Ashley, Tyler, Cara, and Shae (from left)
- Genre: Reality
- Starring: Shain Gandee; Shae Bradley; Anna Davis; Joey Mulcahy; Ashley Whitt; Cara Parrish; Tyler Boulet; Katie Saria; Salwa Amin
- Theme music composer: Heavy Young Heathens
- Opening theme: Teenage Vamp
- Country of origin: United States
- Original language: English
- No. of seasons: 1
- No. of episodes: 12 (and 2 specials)

Production
- Executive producers: Barry Poznick; Colin Nash; J.P. Williams; Jeffrey Hevert; John Stevens; Lauren Dolgen; Michelle Klepper; David Osper
- Running time: 20 to 23 minutes
- Production companies: Parallel Entertainment; Zoo Productions

Original release
- Network: MTV
- Release: January 3 – February 7, 2013

Related
- Slednecks

Buckwild is an American reality television series on MTV that debuted on January 3, 2013, and concluded on February 7, 2013.

== Premise ==
Buckwild follows the lives of nine young adults in Charleston, West Virginia and nearby Sissonville who create their own unique ways to enjoy life in the rural area surrounding them.

== Cast ==
- Shain – "Gandee Candy"
- Shae – "The Spicy Southern Belle"
- Anna – "The Ringleader"
- Joey – "Justin Beaver"
- Ashley – "The Tomboy"
- Cara – "The Firecracker"
- Tyler – "The Pretty Boy"
- Katie – "The College Girl"
- Salwa – "Bengali in Boots"

== Production ==
On November 18, 2011, MTV announced they had picked up the series for a twelve episode first season. The series was originally planned for a 2012 premiere. MTV remained dormant on releasing news about the series for over a year until November 29, 2012, when MTV announced the series would premiere on January 3, 2013, and feature two weekly half-an-hour back-to-back episodes with twelve episodes total. It was announced on February 6, 2013, that Buckwild will be returning for a second season.

Following the death of Shain Gandee on April 1, 2013, due to carbon monoxide poisoning, production of the second season was suspended until further notice.

It was announced on April 9, 2013, that MTV had chosen to cancel the series. On April 14, 2013, it was reported that executive producer J.P. Williams from Parallel Entertainment stated that his company would like to revive the series in another location with a new cast. In April 2014, Slednecks was announced. The series had the same premise as Buckwild but was set in Alaska. However, Slednecks has also since been canceled.

== Episodes ==
=== Season 1 (2013) ===
No.	Title	Original release date	US viewers (millions)
1	"F. the Neighborhood"	January 3, 2013	1.61
2	"Dump Truck Pool Party"	January 3, 2013	1.73
3	"Sexts, Lies & Chicken Wings"	January 10, 2013	1.77
4	"Paint the Town Hyperglow"	January 10, 2013	1.92
5	"Double Trouble"	January 17, 2013	2.17
6	"Birthday Wishes Can Come True"	January 17, 2013	2.45
7	"Raging Bulls"	January 24, 2013	2.60
8	"It's Not a Date"	January 24, 2013	2.66
9	"Pitching a Tent"	January 31, 2013	2.33
10	"Ghosts in the Holler"	January 31, 2013	2.53
11	"Fast & the Curious"	February 7, 2013	2.56
12	"Ramped Up"	February 7, 2013	2.71

=== Specials (2013) ===
Title	Original release date	US viewers (millions)
"Bucking Unseen Moments"	February 7, 2013	2.55
"From the Mud to Manhattan"	April 14, 2013	1.81

== Reception ==
The series is described as having a "Jackass-like element," including depictions of "activities like mud racing, squirrel hunting and rope swinging". It has been criticized for propagating negative stereotypes of West Virginians. The state's film office has refused to authorize a tax credit for its production, citing a concern that it might portray the state "in a significantly derogatory manner". The series has also been deemed the "Redneck Jersey Shore" with the series even debuting on the exact time slot that Jersey Shore once held.

On December 7, 2012, West Virginia Senator Joe Manchin spoke out against the series, explaining that it wrongly depicts the lives of those who reside in the state. Manchin requested that MTV cancel the series before it aired. "This show plays to ugly, inaccurate stereotypes about the people of West Virginia," Sen. Manchin wrote in a letter to the president of MTV. Manchin went on to criticize MTV for encouraging local young people to misbehave for the camera. "You preyed on young people, coaxed them into displaying shameful behavior — and now you are profiting from it. That is just wrong."

== Incidents ==
=== Pre-cancellation ===
==== Arrest of Salwa Amin ====
Cast member Salwa Amin was arrested on February 10, 2013. After obtaining a search warrant, officers moved in on the property. Amin, Shawn Booker and Jason Jones, the owner of the home, were discovered by police hiding in a shed outside. After both were taken out, Salwa had a large quantity of oxycodone in her purse while Booker had a sizable amount of cash. Additionally, three bags of heroin were found in the shed. Jones told police that Amin and Booker brought the drugs to his home in order to distribute. In all, the three were arrested and arraigned on felony charges of possession of a controlled substance with intent to deliver. Amin waived her preliminary hearing in court and her case will now be sent to the grand jury. MTV has no comment on the situation. Amin was rearrested on March 27, 2013, due to her first court-ordered drug test being positive for oxycodone and morphine. She was booked as a pretrial felon and held without bail. On May 4, 2013, it was reported that Amin would be released from jail for an undetermined amount of time in order to complete a court-ordered inpatient rehab program for opiates. After her time was completed, she was placed back in jail.

==== Arrest of Michael Burford ====
On February 15, 2013, recurring cast member Michael "Bluefoot" Burford was arrested for aggravated DUI.

==== Death of Shain Gandee ====
On March 31, 2013, Shain Gandee and his uncle David Gandee were last seen by friends leaving Larry’s Bar in Sissonville at about 3 a.m. Sunday morning. After the pair told friends they were going mudding, Shain and David Gandee were reported missing later that day and a search began. On Monday morning of April 1, 2013, the Gandees and Donald Robert Myers had been missing for about thirty-one hours when a person on a four-wheeler discovered the three men unresponsive on a remote road in the Sissonville area of West Virginia. The three men were located inside Shain's 1984 Ford Bronco, which had become stuck in a deep mud hole extending past the vehicle’s windows. After autopsies were performed, it was confirmed that the three men died due to accidental carbon monoxide poisoning. As a result of the truck’s tailpipe being completely covered in mud, the poisonous gas instead filled the interior of the truck killing all three men. MTV released a statement, saying, “We are shocked and saddened by the terrible news about Shain Gandee, and those involved in this tragic incident. We are waiting for more information but at this time, our main concern is for the Gandee family and their friends. Our thoughts and prayers are with them. Shain had a magnetic personality, with a passion for life that touched everyone he met and we will miss him dearly."

=== Post-cancellation ===
==== Arrest of Joseph Patrick Mulcahy ====
On August 6, 2013, cast member Joseph "Joey" Patrick Mulcahy was arrested for driving under the influence, reckless driving, and failure to report an accident.

==== Arrest of Anna Davis ====
On November 16, 2013, cast member Anna Davis was also arrested for aggravated DUI.

==== Sentencing of Salwa Amin ====
On November 19, 2013, Amin pleaded guilty to possession of a controlled substance with the intent to deliver. As part of her plea deal, Amin has agreed to testify against Booker and Jones. She was sentenced on January 16, 2014 to one to five years in prison.
