= Edward H. Lingo =

American logger

- Born: 12 October 1838; Millsboro, Delaware
- Died: 27 January 1927 (aged 88); Denison, Texas
- Citizenship: U.S.A.
- Occupation: Lumberman
- Known for: Entrepreneur in the Texas lumber business

Edward H. Lingo (October 12, 1838 at Millsboro, Delaware – January 27, 1927 at Denison, Grayson County, Texas), was a Texas lumberman. In later life he was described as "[T]he oldest and staunchest exponent of the industry in the state of Texas, and a man esteemed and admired by a nationwide following of friends"; an appreciation published in 1914 in the Gulf Coast Lumberman states that he was a "remarkable man from a variety of viewpoints…one of the original organizers of the Lumberman's Association of Texas, and one of the ex-presidents of the association...long a strong adherent and abettor of that organization and a power in its councils. He is one of the most progressive men in the industry...a favorite with both the young and the old—famous for the virile optimism that makes him a figure of natural prominence in any lumber gathering."

He moved from Delaware to Chillicothe, Missouri in 1852 with his widowed mother. After attending Central College at Fayette, Missouri, he first went into business as a dry goods merchant, worked for several years in California, and in 1867 began his long and noteworthy career as a lumberman. In 1872 he moved to Denison, Grayson County, Texas, which had recently become a railroad town and a center of population and industry, and entered a partnership with J. P. Leeper & Company, later Waples, Lingo & Company. In 1888 he was founding partner of the firm of Burton-Lingo Company, which became one of the great lumber firms of the Southwest and was an important factor in town construction in Texas. He served as president of the Texas Lumbermen's Association and was a prominent supporter of the Episcopal Church in Texas. at Dallas, Texas, which continued as a family business with his son as manager. He also organized the Lingo-Leeper & Company lime yard firm, which expanded to more than fifty cities and towns in North Texas and Oklahoma. In later years, he founded the Lingo Lumber Company at Dallas, Texas, which continued as a family business with his son as manager.
