= Gorilla Glue =

Polyurethane adhesive

- A bottle of Original Gorilla Glue
- Product type: Glue
- Produced by: The Gorilla Glue Company
- Country: United States
- Introduced: 1994; 32 years ago
- Previous owners: Mark Singer, Lutz Tool Company
- Registered as a trademark in: Worldwide
- Website: gorillatough.com

Gorilla Glue is an American brand of polyurethane adhesives based in Sharonville, Ohio. They are known for their original Gorilla Glue, which was first sold in 1994.

== History ==
In 1994, during a trip to Indonesia, Mark Singer saw Danish-made polyurethane glue being used to make teak furniture. After returning to the US, he founded the company, created the brand name Gorilla Glue, and then acquired the North American rights for the glue from the Danish manufacturer. It was originally marketed towards woodworkers and sold to the general public. The company was purchased by Lutz Tool Company, which later changed its name to The Gorilla Glue Company.

It is privately owned by the Ragland family. In late 2016, the company relocated from its Cincinnati location on Red Bank Road to Sharonville, a suburb of Cincinnati. As of 2025, brothers Pete and Nick Ragland serve as co-presidents of the Gorilla Glue Company.

In 2018, Gorilla Glue Co. bought O'Keeffe's Skincare, the makers of O'Keeffe's Working Hands cream.

== Glue variants ==
Original Gorilla Glue works on wood, stone, foam, metal, ceramic, glass, and other materials. It expands slightly while drying, sometimes enough to cause squeeze-out, which foams up in the air. Super is a fast-drying glue. Gel Super is a no-dripping variety. Gorilla Construction Adhesive is an adhesive used for construction purposes.

== Composition ==
Original Gorilla Glue
Name	CAS-No	% Content	GHS data
Polyisocyanate Prepolymer based on MDI	67815-87-6	40-70	H315, H317, H320, H332, H334, H335, H372
Polymeric Diphenylmethane Diisocyanate (pMDI)	9016-87-9	10-30	H315, H317, H320, H332, H334, H335, H372
4,4'-Diphenylmethane diisocyanate	101-68-8	15-25	H315, H317, H320, H332, H334, H335, H373
Diphenylmethane Diisocyanate (MDI) Mixed Isomers	26447-40-5	1-5	H315, H317, H320, H332, H334, H335
Additive	Trade secret	<0.5	H312, H315, H317, H320, H335

== Health hazards ==
Gorilla Glue is harmful if inhaled. It is irritating to the eyes, respiratory system, nasal system, and skin. If ingested, it may cause gastrointestinal blockage.

== Legal issues ==
In 2015, the Federal Trade Commission (FTC) reviewed Gorilla Glue's claims that its product was made in USA. The FTC alleged "that certain labels and marketing materials may have overstated the extent to which Gorilla Glue adhesive products are made in the United States", because many of the raw materials were sourced overseas first. Due to Gorilla Glue's stated intent to correct this marketing issue, the FTC decided not to take further action.

Gorilla Glue Co. started a lawsuit against the Las Vegas-based developer of marijuana strains, GG Strains LLC. In October 2017, the companies reached a settlement requiring GG Strains and its licensees to cease using the name Gorilla Glue, any gorilla imagery, and similarities to Gorilla Glue Co. trademarks by September 19, 2018. Following this, GG Strains has renamed their product GG or GG4.

== See also ==
- Cyanoacrylate
- Gorilla Tape
- Tessica Brown
