= John Lingo =

- Born: ca. 1500-1510?
- Died: After 1560/1
- Occupation(s): Monk, Chantry priest, Vicar
- Known for: Vicar of St. Hilary aft.1554–ca. 1560/1

John Lingo, born possibly ca. 1500-1510, was Vicar of St. Hilary, in the Vale of Glamorgan, Wales from after 1554 through ca. 1560/1.

Lingo was a former monk and chantry priest, first documented at Llantarnam, a former Cistercian monastery located near the present day suburb of Cwmbran, in southeast Wales, who at some unknown date after the dissolution of Llantarnam in 1536 became a Chantry priest in Cowbridge, in the Vale of Glamorgan, Wales. He was deprived of this post in 1548, but was granted a pension at the maximum rate of £5 per annum. Some time after 1554 he was appointed Vicar of the nearby parish of St. Hilary. In 1560/1 he was returned as absent, and in 1563 his whereabouts were stated to be unknown; no extant record telling when he was replaced has been found.

The timing of Lingo's appointment suggests that he might have been sympathetic to Roman Catholicism, and the timing of his departure by 1560/1 suggests it was a consequence of the passage of the Act of Uniformity of 1558 enforcing Anglican religious orthodoxy within the Church of England.
