= Warped Roadies =

American reality TV show

- Genre: Reality
- Narrated by: Michael P. Greco
- Country of origin: United States
- Original language: English
- No. of seasons: 2
- No. of episodes: 22

Production
- Production company: Magilla Entertainment

Original release
- Network: Fuse
- Release: December 7, 2012 – February 26, 2014

Warped Roadies is an American reality television series that was premiered on Fuse on December 7, 2012. The show follows the road crew behind the scenes on the Warped Tour.
