= T. D. A. Lingo =

American singer and brain theorist (1924–1993)

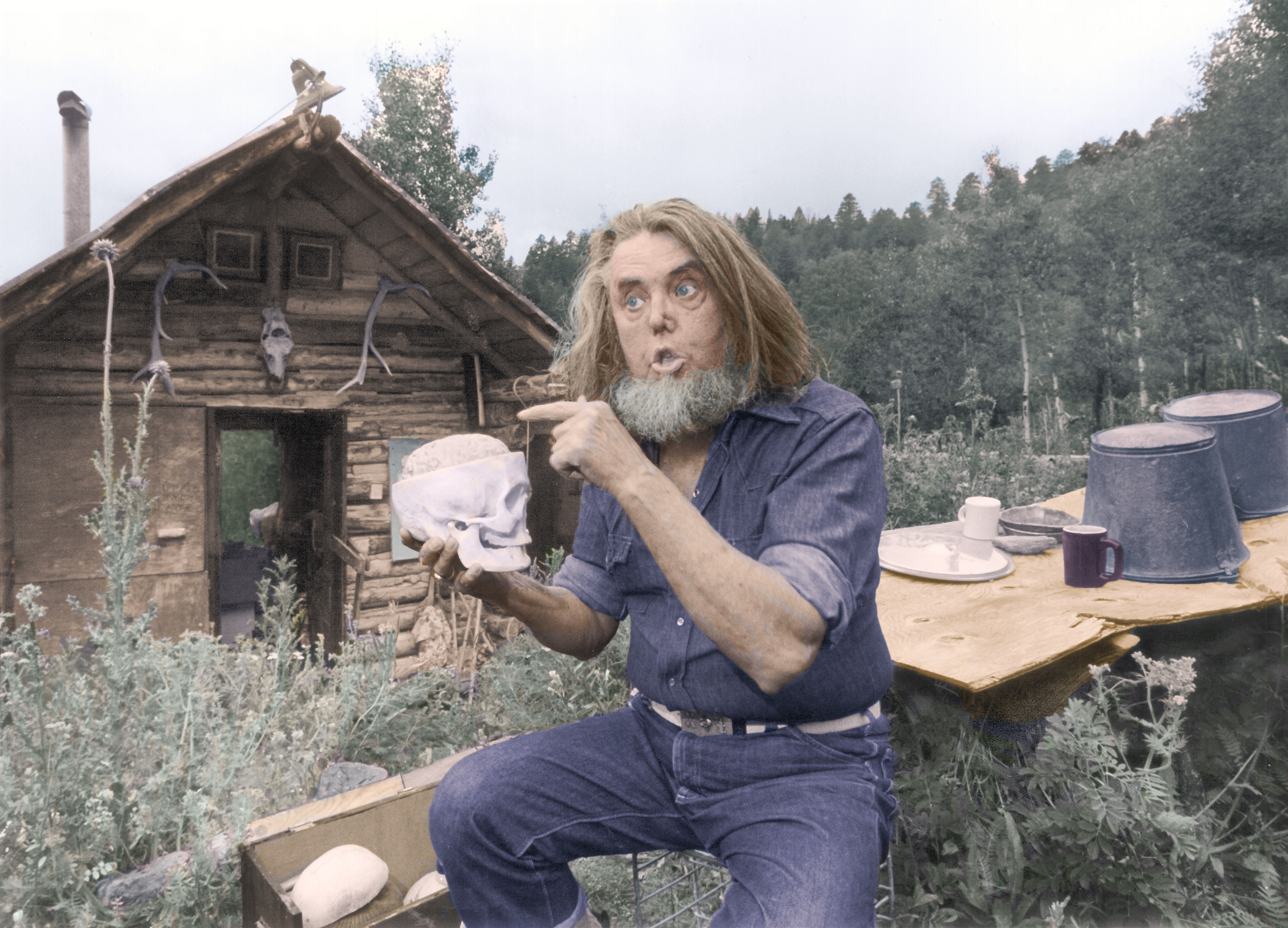
- Born: Paul Lezchuk; December 14, 1924; Chicago, Illinois
- Died: May 13, 1993 (aged 68); Gilpin County, Colorado
- Education: University of Chicago
- Known for: Folk singer, dormant brain theorist

Signature
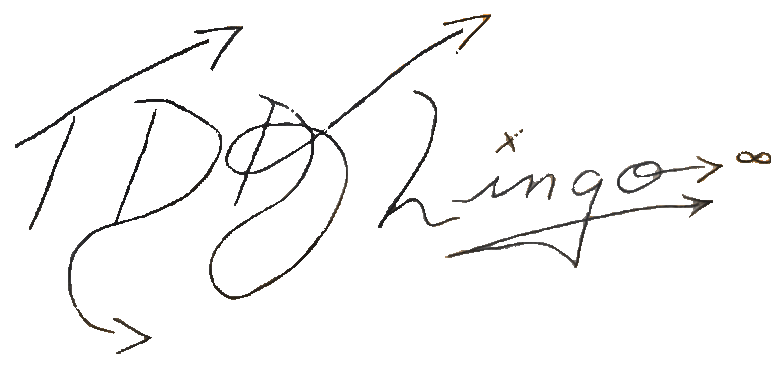

Theocharis Docha Anthropotis (Greek: Θεοχαρης Δοξα Ανθρωπότης) Lingo was an Army veteran, folk singer, radio personality, camp director and researcher who founded the Dormant Brain Research and Development Laboratory near Blackhawk, Colorado, where he was active from 1957 to 1993.

== Life and work ==
Lingo was born Paul Lezchuk in Chicago, Illinois, on December 14, 1924, of Ukrainian-born immigrant parents. At the age of 19, he enlisted on August 19, 1944, in the U.S. Army and reportedly served as an infantry scout, with his group being one of the first to arrive at the death camps to liberate survivors.

After his discharge from active duty on June 27, 1946, Lingo returned to Illinois and entered college, eventually attending the University of Chicago where he said he pursued undergraduate and graduate studies, earning Bachelor of Science and Master of Science degrees and beginning work toward a Doctor of Philosophy degree. Having participated in the Battle of the Bulge in World War II, Lingo was haunted by a question that his years at college failed to answer: "Why must I go to war and kill my brother?" One of his professors advised him that to answer that question, he would have to start his own research project and create his own research lab, which set him on a new course outside academia.

To earn the money to start up a lab, Lingo put his skill with the guitar and folk songs to work. He moved to Colorado, changed his name to Theocharis Docha Anthropotis Lingo, put on a buckskin jacket, and began performing as a folk singer described by the Denver Post as "the Buckskin Balladeer from Lookout Mountain." Among those he influenced was singer Judy Collins, whom he helped introduce to folk music.

As "Lingo the Drifter," he began winning large cash prizes on game shows, including the December 27, 1956 Groucho Marx show You Bet Your Life. After winning a particularly large amount of money on NBC's "High-Low" game show in 1957, he bought 250 acres of land on Laughing Coyote Mountain in the Colorado Rockies near Black Hawk, Colorado, and founded a camp called "The Driftaway" for troubled youths and a Dormant Brain Research and Development Laboratory for independent study of the brain. Local teachers and juvenile detention centers put him in touch with children who attended his camp between 1957 and 1966. The camp closed in the summer of 1966 and Laughing Coyote Mountain became a draw for adults involved in the Counterculture of the 1960s, for whom Lingo hosted bonfires and all-night parties in a high meadow on Laughing Coyote Mountain where he communicated his personal philosophies about life and the brain. Among the relics he showed visitors was the preserved brain of the professor at the University of Chicago who told him to do his own research, who had willed Lingo his brain.

As sole proprietor of his Dormant Brain Research and Development Laboratory, Lingo directed and performed independent brain and behavioral research, and authored essays and lessons about human brain function and behavior that reflected his personal philosophy. Privately supported and working outside government or academic oversight, Lingo’s work led him into areas typically shunned by academics. He claimed to have discovered a way to utilize 100% of his brain, not just the 10% he believed most people used, which enabled him to communicate with non-human species, experience extrasensory perception, and experience multiple orgasms. He coined the phrase, "click your amygdala", to describe voluntary control of amygdaloid function in the brain, which would precipitate increased intelligence, creativity, and positive emotional thinking and behavior. Such conscious control of brain function towards positive brain response with accompanying changes in amygdala activity was corroborated by later research, such as that carried on by Sara W. Lazar, Herbert Benson, and others who focused their work on similar meditative practices to those pioneered by Lingo.

Lingo's research and publishing activities began to decline in the 1980s, and had mostly ceased by 1987. He died on Laughing Coyote Mountain on May 13, 1993, at the age of 68.

== Published works ==
- Lingo, T.D. Mountain Memory Meditation [1959]
- Lingo, T.D. Frontal lobes self-circuiting. Unpublished manuscript [1965]
- Lingo, T.D. Brain dormancy release [1967]
- Lingo, T.D. SOS: Syllabus of Survival, Adventure Trails Survival School [1969]
- Lingo, T.D. The Iron Book; Self-therapy, Adventure Trails Survival School [1971]
- Lingo, T.D. Four power click of the amygdala [1972]
- Lingo, T.D. Sex self-therapy. Unpublished manuscript [1976]
- Lingo, T.D. Telepathy. Unpublished manuscript [1976]
- Lingo, T.D. Child program research report. Unpublished manuscript [1976]
- Lingo, T.D. Self-cure. Unpublished manuscript [1976]
- Lingo, T.D. Brain Self-Control [1977]
- Lingo, T.D. Case study: Angelena Carmella [1977]
- Lingo, T.D. Case study: Suka Deva [1979]
- Lingo, T.D. Self Peak Experiencing [1979]
- Lingo, T.D. Self-Transcending Into the Dormant Frontal Lobes [1981]
- Lingo, T.D. Self-Transcendence Workbook [1989]

== See also ==
- TD Lingo Brain Lab 1979 Documentary
- Lingo's IMDB.com entry
