= The Singles Project =

- Genre: Reality television; Dating show
- Country of origin: United States
- Original language: English
- No. of seasons: 1
- No. of episodes: 8

Production
- Executive producers: Eli Holzman; Stephen Lambert; Rich Bye; Kate Little; Claire Poyser; Derek McLean; John Platt
- Camera setup: Multiple
- Running time: 42 minutes
- Production companies: All3Media America; Goodbye Pictures; Lime Pictures

Original release
- Network: Bravo
- Release: August 12 – September 30, 2014

The Singles Project is an American interactive dating show series that premiered on August 12, 2014, on Bravo. The show featured a group of young and single professionals living in New York City and trying to find love. The docu-series became the first American dating series showing near real-time situations as each episode of the show is shot and aired within one week. The show later syndicated globally.

Bravo had set up an online hub in order to let the viewers to interact with the show's cast throughout the series' run. The website included the cast biographies, their social media accounts, behind-the-scenes videos, and other material. After each episode the network hosted live Twitter Q&A sessions as well as gave the viewers an opportunity to appear on the show by uploading short social videos.

The cast included Kerry Cassidy, Lee Gause, Joey Healy, Tabasum Mir, Ericka Pittman, and Brian Trunzo.

== Episodes ==
No.	Title	Original release date
1	"First Dates"	August 12, 2014
2	"Match Made in Man-Hattan"	August 19, 2014
3	"Virtually in Love"	August 26, 2014
4	"Tweethearts"	September 2, 2014
5	"New York Passion Week"	September 9, 2014
6	"New York Date Of Mind"	September 16, 2014
7	"Fall-ing in Love"	September 23, 2014
8	"Happily Ever After?"	September 30, 2014

== Awards ==
In 2015, the reality series won Creative Arts Emmy Award in the Outstanding Multiplatform Storytelling category.
