= Inside Job (2014 TV series) =

American reality show

- Genre: Reality show
- Country of origin: United States
- Original language: English
- No. of seasons: 1
- No. of episodes: 6

Production
- Executive producers: Eli Holzman; Stephen Lambert
- Production companies: All3Media America; Studio Lambert

Original release
- Network: TNT
- Release: February 28 – April 9, 2014

Inside Job is a reality show on TNT, which premiered on February 28, 2014. In each episode of Inside Job, a group of four people compete to win a job at a large company; although one of the four contestants is secretly already an employee at that company, and is there not to compete but to judge the others' skills and character.

== Episodes ==
No.	Title	Original release date	Prod. code
1	"House of Blues"	February 28, 2014	101
2	"Shoedazzle"	March 7, 2014	102
3	"David Barton Gym"	March 14, 2014	103
4	"Abbyson Living"	March 27, 2014	104
5	"Mazda"	April 2, 2014	105
6	"Johnny Rockets"	April 9, 2014	106

== Reception ==
Brian Lowry of Variety said the show represent a reasonably effective and certainly cohesive one-two combo in speaking to work-related apprehensions.
