= ASBO Teen to Beauty Queen =

2006 British television series

- Created by: North One Television
- Starring: Michelle Fryatt
- Country of origin: United Kingdom
- No. of episodes: 6 x 60 mins

Production
- Running time: 60 mins

Original release
- Network: Five
- Release: 15 November – 20 December 2006

ASBO Teen to Beauty Queen is a British television series about nine teenagers from Manchester, who were trained by Michelle Fryatt, an American former beauty pageant contestant, to compete in the Miss Teen International 2006 beauty pageant in Chicago. Each week, the participants face a series of tasks designed to prepare them to compete in the pageant and at the end of each episode, girls were eliminated from the series. In the last programme, the final three girls flew to Chicago and one was selected as the first Miss Teen England International to enter the pageant. The series was produced for Five by North One Television and has been syndicated on the Swedish Channel TV400 as Från värsting till skönhetsdrottning.

The nine participants were Laura Wilde, Rachel Stewart, Pavia Ward, Ellen Murphy, Neisha Berryman, Ashlie Robinson, Kerry Turner, Sarah Snabities and Elena Demetri. Only Wilde had been the subject of an anti-social behaviour order (ASBO).
