= DeMarcus Family Rules =

- Genre: reality show
- Country of origin: United States
- Original language: English
- No. of seasons: 1
- No. of episodes: 6

Production
- Executive producers: Scott Teti; Todd Chrisley; John Hesling; Simon Knight
- Running time: 25–31 minutes
- Production companies: Maverick Television; All3Media America; Todd Chrisley Productions

Original release
- Network: Netflix
- Release: August 19, 2020

DeMarcus Family Rules is a 2020 reality television show streaming television series starring Allison DeMarcus and Jay DeMarcus.

== Cast ==
- Allison DeMarcus
- Jay DeMarcus
- James Otto
- Amy Otto

== Episodes ==
No.	Title	Original release date
1	"Rules We Live By"	August 19, 2020
2	"Gone Camping"	August 19, 2020
3	"Babies, Budgets and Birthdays"	August 19, 2020
4	"Life Is a Highway"	August 19, 2020
5	"A Dog Day Thanksgiving"	August 19, 2020
6	"Rules for the Future"	August 19, 2020

== Release ==
DeMarcus Family Rules was released on August 19, 2020, on Netflix.
