= Job or No Job =

- Genre: Reality television
- Presented by: Jane Buckingham
- Country of origin: United States
- Original language: English
- No. of seasons: 1
- No. of episodes: 10

Production
- Executive producers: Eli Holzman; Greg Goldman; Sara Quick; Stephen Lambert
- Production companies: All3Media America; Studio Lambert

Original release
- Network: ABC Family
- Release: August 5 – October 1, 2015

Job or No Job is an American reality television series that premiered on ABC Family on August 5, 2015. The show moved to Thursdays at 3pm/2c after two low-rated episodes.

== Episodes ==
| No. | Title | Original release date | US viewers (millions) |
|---|---|---|---|
| 1 | "Chicago Restaurants" | August 5, 2015 | 0.14 |
| 2 | "Los Angeles Fashion" | August 12, 2015 | 0.19 |
| 3 | "Los Angeles Real Estate" | September 3, 2015 | 0.10 |
| 4 | "Nashville Event Planning" | September 3, 2015 | 0.10 |
| 5 | "New York City Interior Design" | September 10, 2015 | 0.09 |
| 6 | "New York City Online Magazine" | September 17, 2015 | 0.14 |
| 7 | "San Francisco Startups" | September 24, 2015 | 0.09 |
| 8 | "Los Angeles Music" | September 30, 2015 | 0.06 |
| 9 | "Portland Graphic Design" | September 30, 2015 | 0.08 |
| 10 | "New York City Advertising" | October 1, 2015 | 0.13 |
