= Slednecks =

American reality television series

- Genre: Docu-Reality
- Starring: Jackie; Hali; Big Mike; Dylan; Tosca; Zeke; Amber; Kelly; Samantha; Sierra; Trevor; Leonard Haire
- Country of origin: United States
- Original language: English
- No. of seasons: 1
- No. of episodes: 19

Production
- Executive producers: Barry Poznick; Colin Nash; J.P. Williams; Jeffrey Hevert; John Stevens; Lauren Dolgen; Michelle Klepper; David Osper
- Running time: 30 minutes
- Production companies: Parallel Entertainment; Zoo Productions

Original release
- Network: MTV
- Release: October 30 – December 19, 2014

Slednecks is an American reality television series about a group of friends living in Wasilla, Alaska that premiered on MTV on October 30, 2014. The show's title is borrowed from a slang term referring to "rednecks" who live in snowy climes, like Alaska. The series has the same basic premise as Buckwild, the popular show that preceded Slednecks on Thursday nights (but was canceled after one of its cast members died). Slednecks was cancelled after one season due to low ratings.

== Premise ==
Slednecks is a documentary series that follows a group of friends living in the "modern-day Wild Wild West of Alaska".

== Cast ==
=== Main ===
- Jackie – "Inupiat Eskimo from Kotzebue"
- Hali – "Straight Shooter"
- Big Mike – "Pure Bred Alaskan"
- Dylan – "El Tornado"
- Tosca – "The Tomboy"
- Zeke – "Adrenaline Junkie"
- Amber – "Big City"
- Kelly – "The On again Off again"
- Samantha – "The Youngster"
- Sierra – "Sassy and Outspoken"
- Trevor – "Fungineer"

=== Recurring ===
- Leonard – "The Boss"
- Jack – "Jackie's Dad"

== Development ==
When it was announced on April 9, 2013, that MTV had chosen to cancel Buckwild, it was reported that executive producer J.P. Williams from Parallel Entertainment stated that his company would like to revive the series in another location with a new cast.

== Production ==
On April 24, 2014, Slednecks was announced. According to MTV President Stephen Friedman, the series set in Alaska "will not be a version of 'Buckwild' in a different setting", but like Jersey Shore and Laguna Beach: The Real Orange County will "be focused on the unusual experiences of a different group of people".

On December 30, 2014 the cast announced via Twitter that the show had been canceled.

== Episodes ==
The first (and only) season aired episode in pairs, back to back. The series' special 90-minute premiere aired on October 30, 2014, but was released a week earlier on October 23, 2014 for the MTV app as well as the Xbox One app and Xbox 360 for Xbox Live members living in the United States.

No.	Title	Original release date	US viewers (millions)
1	"Wash Away Your Sins"	October 30, 2014	0.72
2	"Turn Down for Zeke"	October 30, 2014	0.64
3	"Operation Revenge"	October 30, 2014	0.70
4	"Roommate Romp"	November 6, 2014	0.49
5	"Breakup Season Party"	November 6, 2014	0.46
6	"Thrilla in Wasilla"	November 13, 2014	0.52
7	"Hell Week"	November 13, 2014	0.58
8	"Raft'N Romance"	November 20, 2014	0.64
9	"Arctic Adventure"	November 20, 2014	0.57
10	"Girl Fight"	November 20, 2014	0.56
11	"Party Island"	December 4, 2014	N/A
12	"Glacial Facial"	December 4, 2014	N/A
13	"You've Been Chii'd"	December 11, 2014	0.50
14	"That's my B."	December 11, 2014	0.46
15	"Roommate From Hell"	December 18, 2014	0.54
16	"Body Shots and a Bear Job"	December 18, 2014	0.44
17	"Gears, Sparkles and Broken Hearts"	December 18, 2014	N/A
18	"Longest Party Ever"	December 18, 2014	0.45
19	"Slednecks Untamed: The Unseen Footage"	December 19, 2014	N/A

== Ratings ==
Season	Timeslot (ET)	No. of episodes	Premiered		Ended	
Season	Timeslot (ET)	No. of episodes	Date	Premiere viewers (in millions)	Date	Finale viewers (in millions)
1	Thursday 10:00 pm Thursday 11:00 pm	19	October 30, 2014	0.72	December 19, 2014	TBA
