= North One Television =

British television production company

- Formerly: Chrysalis Television (1980–2004)
- Type: Subsidiary
- Industry: Television production
- Founded: 1980; 46 years ago
- Headquarters: London and Birmingham, England
- Key people: Neil Duncanson (chairman); Steve Gowans (CEO); Dan Coomber (COO)
- Products: Television programmes: Formula 1 coverage on ITV; Football Italia; ASBO Teen to Beauty Queen; The Gadget Show; Fifth Gear; Isle of Man TT
- Parent: Chrysalis Group (1980–2004); All3Media (2004–2026); Banijay UK (2026–present)
- Website: northone.tv

North One Television (also known as North One and formerly known as Chrysalis Television) is a production company based in London and Birmingham, England. Part of Banijay Entertainment since 2026 and previously being part of All3Media from 2004 until 2026, the company specializes in factual entertainment, sports and live programming.

The company was originally formed in 1980 by Chrysalis Group to produce facilities, and eight years later in 1988, expanded to produce news and sports programming.

The name change from Chrysalis to North One took effect in 2004.

North One won a tender for a programme to accompany Channel 4's Formula 1 coverage from 2016.
