= List of ended Amazon Prime Video original programming =

These original Amazon Prime Video shows have either completed their runs or stopped producing episodes. A show is also assumed to have ended if there has been no confirmed news of renewal at least one year after the show's last episode was released.

== Original programming ==
=== Drama ===
Title	Genre	Premiere	Finale	Seasons	Notes
Bosch	Detective fiction	February 13, 2015	June 25, 2021	7 seasons, 68 episodes	
Sneaky Pete	Crime drama	August 5, 2015	May 10, 2019	3 seasons, 30 episodes	
Hand of God	Psychological thriller	September 4, 2015	March 10, 2017	2 seasons, 20 episodes	
Patriot	Crime drama	November 5, 2015	November 9, 2018	2 seasons, 18 episodes	
Z: The Beginning of Everything	Historical period drama	November 5, 2015	January 27, 2017	1 season, 10 episodes	
Good Girls Revolt	Historical period drama	November 11, 2015	October 28, 2016	1 season, 10 episodes	
The Man in the High Castle	Alternative history	November 20, 2015	November 15, 2019	4 seasons, 40 episodes	
Mad Dogs	Drama	January 22, 2016	January 22, 2016	1 season, 10 episodes	
The Last Tycoon	Historical period drama	July 27, 2016	July 28, 2017	1 season, 9 episodes	
Goliath	Legal drama	October 14, 2016	September 24, 2021	4 seasons, 32 episodes	(Note: Unavailable)
Lore	Anthology horror	October 13, 2017	October 19, 2018	2 seasons, 12 episodes	
Jack Ryan	Political thriller	August 31, 2018	July 14, 2023	4 seasons, 30 episodes	
The Romanoffs	Anthology drama	October 12, 2018	November 23, 2018	1 season, 8 episodes	
Homecoming	Psychological thriller	November 2, 2018	May 22, 2020	2 seasons, 17 episodes	
Hanna	Action	March 29, 2019	November 24, 2021	3 seasons, 22 episodes	
Too Old to Die Young	Crime drama	June 14, 2019		10 episodes	(Note: Miniseries)
The Boys	Superhero drama	July 26, 2019	May 20, 2026	5 seasons, 40 episodes	
Carnival Row	Fantasy	August 30, 2019	March 17, 2023	2 seasons, 18 episodes	
Hunters	Drama	February 21, 2020	January 13, 2023	2 seasons, 18 episodes	
Tales from the Loop	Science fiction	April 3, 2020		1 season, 8 episodes	
Utopia	Drama	September 25, 2020		1 season, 8 episodes	
The Wilds	Young adult drama	December 11, 2020	May 6, 2022	2 seasons, 18 episodes	
Them	Anthology horror drama	April 9, 2021	April 25, 2024	2 seasons, 18 episodes	
The Underground Railroad	Drama	May 14, 2021		10 episodes	
Solos	Science fiction drama anthology	May 21, 2021		7 episodes	
Panic	Young adult drama	May 28, 2021		1 season, 10 episodes	
I Know What You Did Last Summer	Young adult horror	October 15, 2021	November 12, 2021	1 season, 8 episodes	
The Wheel of Time	Fantasy	November 19, 2021	April 17, 2025	3 seasons, 24 episodes	
Outer Range	Mystery thriller	April 15, 2022	May 16, 2024	2 seasons, 15 episodes	
Night Sky	Science fiction drama	May 20, 2022		1 season, 8 episodes	
The Summer I Turned Pretty	Young adult romantic drama	June 17, 2022	September 17, 2025	3 seasons, 26 episodes	
Paper Girls	Science fiction	July 29, 2022		1 season, 8 episodes	
Jungle	Music drama	September 30, 2022		1 season, 6 episodes	
The Peripheral	Science fiction	October 21, 2022	December 2, 2022	1 season, 8 episodes	
Three Pines	Crime drama	December 2, 2022	December 23, 2022	1 season, 8 episodes	
The Rig	Supernatural thriller	January 6, 2023	January 2, 2025	2 seasons, 12 episodes	
The Consultant	Dark comedy thriller	February 24, 2023		1 season, 8 episodes	
Daisy Jones & the Six	Musical drama	March 3, 2023	March 24, 2023	10 episodes	
Swarm	Horror thriller	March 17, 2023		7 episodes	
The Power	Science fiction drama	March 31, 2023	May 12, 2023	1 season, 9 episodes	
Dead Ringers	Psychological thriller	April 21, 2023		6 episodes	
The Horror of Dolores Roach	Horror	July 7, 2023		1 season, 8 episodes	
The Lost Flowers of Alice Hart	Drama	August 4, 2023	September 1, 2023	7 episodes	
Harlan Coben's Shelter	Thriller	August 18, 2023	September 22, 2023	1 season, 8 episodes	
Wilderness	Psychological thriller	September 15, 2023		6 episodes	
Gen V	Superhero teen drama	September 29, 2023	October 22, 2025	2 seasons, 16 episodes	
In Your Dreams	Fantasy drama	November 24, 2023		1 season, 6 episodes	
Expats	Drama	January 26, 2024	February 23, 2024	6 episodes	
Big Girls Don't Cry	Coming-of-age drama	March 14, 2024		1 season, 7 episodes	
The Baxters	Family drama	March 28, 2024		3 seasons, 34 episodes	
Cruel Intentions	Romance drama	November 21, 2024		1 season, 8 episodes	
On Call	Crime drama	January 9, 2025		1 season, 8 episodes	
The Bondsman	Horror action	April 3, 2025		1 season, 8 episodes	
Étoile	Comedy drama	April 24, 2025		1 season, 8 episodes	
Motorheads	Coming of age drama	May 20, 2025		1 season, 10 episodes	
The Better Sister	Thriller	May 29, 2025		8 episodes	
Countdown	Thriller	June 25, 2025	September 3, 2025	1 season, 13 episodes	
Butterfly	Spy thriller	August 13, 2025		1 season, 6 episodes	
The Terminal List: Dark Wolf	Conspiracy thriller	August 27, 2025	September 24, 2025	1 season, 7 episodes	
The Runarounds	Teen drama	September 1, 2025		1 season, 8 episodes	
The Girlfriend	Psychological thriller	September 10, 2025		6 episodes	
Hotel Costiera	Action comedy drama	September 24, 2025		1 season, 6 episodes	
Lazarus	Psychological thriller	October 22, 2025		6 episodes	
Malice	Psychological thriller	November 14, 2025		1 season, 6 episodes	
It's Not Like That (Note: Episodes were initially released through the Wonder Project subscription service and premiered on Prime Video globally at a later date.)	Drama	January 25, 2026 (Note: Wonder Project)	March 8, 2026	1 season, 8 episodes	
It's Not Like That	Drama	May 15, 2026 (Note: Prime Video)		1 season, 8 episodes	
The Gray House	Historical drama	February 26, 2026		8 episodes	
The Greatest	Sports biopic drama	November 4, 2026		8 episodes	

=== Comedy ===
Title	Genre	Premiere	Finale	Seasons	Notes
Betas	Comedy	April 19, 2013	January 17, 2014	1 season, 11 episodes	
Alpha House	Political satire	April 19, 2013	October 24, 2014	2 seasons, 21 episodes	
Gortimer Gibbon's Life on Normal Street	Teen sitcom/Fantasy	April 19, 2014	July 15, 2016	2 seasons, 39 episodes	
Annedroids	Science fiction	July 25, 2014	March 3, 2017	4 seasons, 52 episodes	
Red Oaks	Comedy drama	August 28, 2014	October 20, 2017	3 seasons, 26 episodes	
Transparent	Comedy drama	September 26, 2014	September 27, 2019	5 seasons, 41 episodes	
Mozart in the Jungle	Comedy drama	December 23, 2014	February 16, 2018	4 seasons, 40 episodes	
Just Add Magic	Fantasy	January 15, 2015	October 25, 2019	3 seasons, 51 episodes	
The Kicks	Teen sitcom	June 26, 2015	September 1, 2016	1 season, 10 episodes	
One Mississippi	Comedy drama	November 5, 2015	September 8, 2017	2 seasons, 12 episodes	
Sigmund and the Sea Monsters	Fantasy	June 17, 2016	October 13, 2017	1 season, 7 episodes	
The Tick	Superhero	August 18, 2016	April 5, 2019	2 seasons, 22 episodes	
I Love Dick	Comedy drama	August 19, 2016	May 12, 2017	1 season, 8 episodes	
Jean-Claude Van Johnson	Comedy drama	August 19, 2016	December 15, 2017	1 season, 6 episodes	
Crisis in Six Scenes	Comedy	September 30, 2016		6 episodes	
Comrade Detective	Comedy drama	August 4, 2017		1 season, 6 episodes	
The Marvelous Mrs. Maisel	Comedy drama	November 29, 2017	May 26, 2023	5 seasons, 43 episodes	
The Dangerous Book for Boys	Comedy drama	March 30, 2018		1 season, 6 episodes	
Forever	Comedy drama	September 14, 2018		1 season, 8 episodes	
Modern Love	Romantic comedy anthology	October 18, 2019	August 13, 2021	2 seasons, 16 episodes	
Just Add Magic: Mystery City	Fantasy	January 16, 2020		1 season, 10 episodes	
Upload	Science fiction	May 1, 2020	August 25, 2025	4 seasons, 29 episodes	
Gary Busey: Pet Judge	Court show	May 25, 2020		1 season, 6 episodes	
Truth Seekers	Comedy horror	October 30, 2020		1 season, 8 episodes	
The Moth Effect	Comedy	July 30, 2021		1 season, 6 episodes	
Borat's American Lockdown & Debunking Borat	Comedy	May 24, 2021		7 episodes	
Back to the Rafters	Comedy drama	September 17, 2021		1 season, 6 episodes	
Harlem	Comedy	December 3, 2021	February 6, 2025	3 seasons, 24 episodes	
With Love	Romantic comedy	December 17, 2021	June 2, 2023	2 seasons, 11 episodes	
As We See It	Comedy drama	January 21, 2022		1 season, 8 episodes	
The Lake	Romantic comedy	June 17, 2022	June 9, 2023	2 seasons, 16 episodes	
A League of Their Own	Sports comedy	August 12, 2022		1 season, 8 episodes	
Mammals	Comedy drama	November 11, 2022		1 season, 6 episodes	
Class of '07	Comedy	March 17, 2023		1 season, 8 episodes	
I'm a Virgo	Dark comedy	June 23, 2023		7 episodes	
She Must Be Obeyed	Comedy drama	September 29, 2023		5 episodes	
My Lady Jane	Historical comedy	June 27, 2024		1 season, 8 episodes	
The Pradeeps of Pittsburgh (Note: Concurrently premiered on Prime Video & Amazon Freevee.)	Comedy	October 17, 2024		1 season, 8 episodes	
The Sticky	Heist dark comedy	December 6, 2024		1 season, 6 episodes	
Clean Slate	Comedy	February 6, 2025		1 season, 8 episodes	
Ride or Die	Action adventure comedy	July 15, 2026		1 season, 8 episodes	

=== Animation ===
==== Adult animation ====
Title	Genre	Premiere	Finale	Seasons	Notes
Undone	Psychological comedy drama	September 13, 2019	April 29, 2022	2 seasons, 16 episodes	
Fairfax	Comedy	October 29, 2021	June 10, 2022	2 seasons, 16 episodes	
The Boys Presents: Diabolical	Superhero anthology	March 4, 2022		1 season, 8 episodes	
The Second Best Hospital in the Galaxy	Science fiction black comedy	February 23, 2024	May 27, 2025	2 seasons, 16 episodes	
Sausage Party: Foodtopia	Comedy	July 11, 2024	August 13, 2025	2 seasons, 16 episodes	
Kevin	Comedy	April 20, 2026		1 season, 8 episodes	

==== Anime ====
Title	Genre	Premiere	Finale	Seasons	Notes
Crayon Shin-chan Spin-off	Comedy	August 3, 2016	August 23, 2017	4 seasons, 52 episodes	
Blade of the Immortal	Historical action	October 10, 2019	March 25, 2020	1 season, 24 episodes	
Tatsuki Fujimoto 17-26	Anthology	November 7, 2025		1 season, 8 episodes	

==== Kids & family ====
Title	Genre	Premiere	Finale	Seasons	Notes
Creative Galaxy	Preschool science fiction	October 2, 2013	June 4, 2019	3 seasons, 36 episodes	(Note: Also aired on Amazon Kids)
Tumble Leaf	Preschool adventure	May 23, 2014	February 25, 2019	4 seasons, 52 episodes	(Note: Also aired on Amazon Kids)
Wishenpoof!	Fantasy	February 5, 2014	May 9, 2019	2 seasons, 39 episodes	(Note: Also aired on Amazon Kids)
The Stinky & Dirty Show	Preschool	January 15, 2015	August 23, 2019	2 seasons, 39 episodes	(Note: Also aired on Amazon Kids)
Danger & Eggs	Adventure comedy	November 5, 2015	June 30, 2017	1 season, 13 episodes	
Niko and the Sword of Light	Action fantasy	July 20, 2017	September 6, 2019	2 seasons, 23 episodes	
Lost in Oz	Fantasy	June 26, 2015	June 8, 2018	1 season, 26 episodes	(Note: Also aired on Amazon Kids)
If You Give a Mouse a Cookie	Preschool adventure	November 4, 2015	October 14, 2021	2 seasons, 53 episodes	(Note: Also aired on Amazon Kids)
Little Big Awesome	Adventure	June 17, 2016	November 8, 2018	1 season, 13 episodes	
Pete the Cat	Musical comedy	December 26, 2017	March 11, 2022	2 seasons, 41 episodes	
The Adventures of Rocky and Bullwinkle	Action-adventure comedy	May 11, 2018	January 11, 2019	1 season, 26 episodes	
Kung Fu Panda: The Paws of Destiny	Action comedy	November 16, 2018	July 5, 2019	1 season, 26 episodes	
Costume Quest	Fantasy comedy	March 8, 2019	November 22, 2019	1 season, 14 episodes	
Bug Diaries	Preschool series	April 12, 2019	October 2, 2020	1 season, 12 episodes	
Jessy & Nessy	Preschool animation/live-action	March 13, 2020	October 8, 2021	1 season, 20 episodes	
Arpo Robot Babysitter	Comedy Preschool	November 1, 2021	April 26, 2022	6 seasons, 34 episodes	
Do, Re & Mi	Musical comedy	September 17, 2021	July 28, 2022	1 season, 26 episodes	
Angry Birds Mystery Island	Mystery comedy	May 21, 2024	December 3, 2024	1 season, 24 episodes	
The Chosen Adventures	Christian adventure	October 17, 2025		1 season, 14 episodes	
Bat-Fam	Superhero comedy	November 10, 2025		1 season, 10 episodes	

=== Non-English language scripted ===
==== Danish ====
Title	Genre	Premiere	Finale	Seasons	Notes
Bullshit	Drama	April 19, 2024		1 season, 6 episodes	
Those Who Kill (season 4)	Crime thriller	September 27, 2024		1 season, 8 episodes	
Snake Killer	Crime thriller	January 16, 2026		4 episodes	

==== Filipino ====
Title	Genre	Premiere	Finale	Seasons	Notes
Fit Check: Confessions of an Ukay Queen	Comedy drama	July 6, 2023		1 season, 8 episodes	
Linlang	Mystery thriller	October 5, 2023	November 16, 2023	1 season, 14 episodes	
Simula sa Gitna	Comedy drama	November 2, 2023	December 7, 2023	1 season, 6 episodes	
Roadkillers	Action thriller	November 30, 2023	December 7, 2023	4 episodes	
Saving Grace	Drama	November 28, 2024	January 9, 2025	14 episodes	
The Alibi	Romantic thriller	November 7, 2025	December 19, 2025	14 episodes	
The Silent Noise	Crime drama	March 20, 2026	April 24, 2026	10 episodes	
The Loyalty Game	Psychological drama	July 3, 2026	August 12, 2026	14 episodes	
Honor Thy Mother	Family drama	September 11, 2026	October 23, 2026	1 season, 14 episodes	

==== French ====
Title	Genre	Premiere	Finale	Seasons	Notes
Voltaire High	Historical drama	June 14, 2021		1 season, 8 episodes	
Totems	Historical drama	February 18, 2022	March 11, 2022	1 season, 8 episodes	
Miskina, Poor Thing	Comedy	September 29, 2022		1 season, 8 episodes	
Greek Salad	Comedy drama	April 14, 2023		8 episodes	
Killer Coaster	Crime drama	September 15, 2023		1 season, 8 episodes	
Alphonse	Comedy	October 12, 2023	November 2, 2023	1 season, 6 episodes	
Escort Boys	Comedy drama	December 22, 2023	June 13, 2025	2 seasons, 12 episodes	
The Source	Action	March 28, 2024		1 season, 7 episodes	

==== German ====
Title	Genre	Premiere	Finale	Seasons	Notes
You Are Wanted	Thriller	March 12, 2017	May 18, 2018	2 seasons, 12 episodes	
Beat	Crime thriller	November 9, 2018		1 season, 7 episodes	
Bibi & Tina	Teen sitcom	April 3, 2020		1 season, 10 episodes	
We Children from Bahnhof Zoo	Drama	February 19, 2021		8 episodes	
Love Addicts	Comedy	November 29, 2022		1 season, 8 episodes	
The Pimp – No F***ing Fairytale	Drama	March 3, 2023		1 season, 8 episodes	
The Gryphon	Fantasy drama	May 25, 2023		1 season, 6 episodes	
Sebastian Fitzek's The Therapy	Mystery thriller	October 26, 2023		1 season, 6 episodes	
Mandy and the Forces of Evil	Horror comedy	November 3, 2023		1 season, 8 episodes	
Viktor Bringt's	Comedy	May 30, 2024		1 season, 8 episodes	
The Perfect Miss	Romantic comedy	August 15, 2024		1 season, 8 episodes	
Miss Sophie – Same Procedure As Every Year	Murder mystery	December 22, 2025		6 episodes	

==== Hindi ====
Title	Genre	Premiere	Finale	Seasons	Notes
Inside Edge	Sports drama	July 10, 2017	December 3, 2021	3 seasons, 30 episodes	
Laakhon Mein Ek	Drama	October 13, 2017	April 12, 2019	2 seasons, 14 episodes	
Pushpavalli	Comedy drama	December 15, 2017	March 12, 2020	2 seasons, 16 episodes	
Shaitaan Haveli	Horror comedy	January 5, 2018		1 season, 8 episodes	
Breathe	Thriller	January 26, 2018	March 2, 2018	1 season, 8 episodes	
Chacha Vidhayak Hain Humare	Comedy	May 11, 2018	March 26, 2021	2 seasons, 16 episodes	(Note: Moved to Amazon miniTV)
Made in Heaven	Drama	March 7, 2019	August 10, 2023	2 seasons, 16 episodes	
Mind the Malhotras	Sitcom	June 7, 2019	August 12, 2022	2 seasons, 19 episodes	
The Family Man	Espionage	September 20, 2019	June 4, 2021	2 seasons, 19 episodes	
Mirzapur	Crime thriller	September 20, 2019	July 5, 2024	3 seasons, 29 episodes	
Hostel Daze	Comedy drama	December 13, 2019	September 27, 2023	4 seasons, 21 episodes	
The Forgotten Army	War drama	January 24, 2020		5 episodes	
Afsos	Comedy drama	February 6, 2020		1 season, 8 episodes	
Paatal Lok	Crime thriller	May 15, 2020	January 17, 2025	2 seasons, 17 episodes	
Rasbhari	Comedy drama	June 25, 2020		1 season, 8 episodes	
Breathe: Into the Shadows	Thriller	July 10, 2020	November 8, 2022	2 seasons, 20 episodes	
Bandish Bandits	Musical romance drama	August 4, 2020	December 13, 2024	2 seasons, 18 episodes	
Tandav	Political thriller	January 15, 2021		1 season, 9 episodes	
The Last Hour	Crime thriller	May 14, 2021		1 season, 8 episodes	
Mumbai Diaries 26/11	Thriller	September 9, 2021		1 season, 8 episodes	
Akkad Bakkad Rafu Chakkar	Crime drama	November 3, 2021		1 season, 10 episodes	
Bestseller	Thriller	February 18, 2022		8 episodes	
Guilty Minds	Legal drama	April 22, 2022		1 season, 10 episodes	
Modern Love Mumbai	Romantic comedy anthology	May 13, 2022		1 season, 6 episodes	
Crash Course	Sports teen drama	August 4, 2022		1 season, 10 episodes	
Hush Hush	Drama	September 22, 2022		1 season, 7 episodes	
Jubilee	Period drama	April 7, 2023	April 14, 2023	1 season, 10 episodes	
Dahaad	Crime procedural	May 12, 2023		1 season, 8 episodes	
Jee Karda	Romantic drama	June 15, 2023		1 season, 8 episodes	
Adhura	Horror	July 7, 2023		1 season, 7 episodes	
Bombay My Beloved	Crime thriller	September 14, 2023		1 season, 10 episodes	
P.I. Meena	Crime thriller	November 3, 2023		1 season, 8 episodes	
Dil Dosti Dilemma	Teen drama	April 25, 2024		1 season, 7 episodes	
Citadel: Honey Bunny	Spy thriller	November 7, 2024		1 season, 6 episodes	
Waack Girls	Comedy drama	November 22, 2024		1 season, 9 episodes	
Ziddi Girls	Coming of age comedy drama	February 27, 2025		1 season, 8 episodes	
Khauf	Supernatural horror	April 18, 2025		1 season, 8 episodes	
Rangeen	Drama	July 25, 2025		1 season, 9 episodes	
Andhera	Horror	August 14, 2025		1 season, 8 episodes	
Do You Wanna Partner	Comedy drama	September 12, 2025		1 season, 8 episodes	

==== Indonesian ====
Title	Genre	Premiere	Finale	Seasons	Notes
Induk Gajah	Comedy drama	March 23, 2023	August 21, 2024	2 seasons, 16 episodes	
A+	Coming-of-age crime drama	May 25, 2023		1 season, 6 episodes	
Sabtu Bersama Bapak	Family drama	June 29, 2023		1 season, 6 episodes	
Rencana Besar	Heist thriller	October 5, 2023		1 season, 6 episodes	
Tukar Tambah Nasib	Fantasy drama	December 7, 2023		1 season, 6 episodes	
Ellyas Pical	Sports drama	March 21, 2024		1 season, 6 episodes	

==== Italian ====
Title	Genre	Premiere	Finale	Seasons	Notes
Vita da Carlo	Comedy	November 5, 2021		1 season, 10 episodes	(Note: Moved to Paramount+)
Bang Bang Baby	Crime drama	April 28, 2022		1 season, 10 episodes	
The Bad Guy	Crime comedy	December 9, 2022	December 4, 2024	2 seasons, 12 episodes	
Prisma	Teen drama	September 21, 2022	June 6, 2024	2 seasons, 16 episodes	
Everybody Loves Diamonds	Heist drama	October 13, 2023		1 season, 8 episodes	
No Activity: Italy	Comedy	January 18, 2024		1 season, 6 episodes	
Antonia	Comedy drama	March 4, 2024		1 season, 6 episodes	
Citadel: Diana	Spy thriller	October 10, 2024		1 season, 6 episodes	

==== Japanese ====
Title	Genre	Premiere	Finale	Seasons	Notes
Ultraman Orb: The Origin Saga	Superhero action drama	December 26, 2016	March 13, 2017	1 season, 12 episodes	
Amazon Riders	Superhero action thriller	April 20, 2018	September 21, 2018	2 seasons, 26 episodes	
Businessmen vs. Aliens	Science fiction comedy	April 20, 2018		1 season, 10 episodes	
Fukuyadou Honpo: Kyoto Love Story	Romance drama	April 20, 2018		1 season, 12 episodes	
Happy Marriage!?	Romance drama	April 20, 2018		1 season, 12 episodes	
Tokyo Girl	Drama	April 20, 2018		1 season, 11 episodes	
Tokyo Vampire Hotel	Horror drama	April 20, 2018		1 season, 9 episodes	
Tokyo Alice	Comedy drama	June 19, 2019		1 season, 12 episodes	
Final Life	Mystery drama	June 21, 2019		1 season, 12 episodes	
Peep Time	Sitcom	September 18, 2020		1 season, 8 episodes	
No Activity	Detective comedy	December 17, 2021	September 12, 2024	2 seasons, 12 episodes	
My Love from the Stars	Romance drama	February 23, 2022		1 season, 10 episodes	
Game of Spy	Spy thriller	June 24, 2022	July 8, 2022	1 season, 10 episodes	
More Than Words	Drama	September 16, 2022		1 season, 10 episodes	
Map for the Wedding	Drama	October 7, 2022		1 season, 10 episodes	
Modern Love Tokyo	Romantic comedy anthology	October 21, 2022		1 season, 7 episodes	
Kamen Rider Black Sun	Superhero action	October 28, 2022		1 season, 10 episodes	
A2Z	Romance drama	February 3, 2023		1 season, 10 episodes	
Angel Flight	Medical drama	March 17, 2023		1 season, 6 episodes	
My Undead Yokai Girlfriend	Romantic horror comedy	March 22, 2024		1 season, 8 episodes	
1122: For a Happy Marriage	Romantic drama	June 14, 2024	June 28, 2024	1 season, 7 episodes	
Like a Dragon: Yakuza	Action crime drama	October 24, 2024	October 30, 2024	1 season, 6 episodes	
Oshi no Ko	Fantasy idol drama	November 28, 2024		8 episodes	
Marry My Husband: Japan	Romantic dark comedy	June 27, 2025	July 24, 2025	10 episodes	
Human Specimens	Psychological thriller	December 18, 2025		5 episodes	
Hanzaisha: Criminal	Crime thriller	July 17, 2026	July 30, 2027	7 episodes	

==== Korean ====
Title	Genre	Premiere	Finale	Seasons	Notes
The Idolmaster KR	Musical drama	April 28, 2017	October 6, 2017	24 episodes	
My Man Is Cupid	Fantasy romantic comedy	December 1, 2023	January 20, 2024	16 episodes	

==== Norwegian ====
Title	Genre	Premiere	Finale	Seasons	Notes
Furia (season 2)	Political thriller	April 19, 2024		1 season, 6 episodes	
The Commoner	Period drama	February 14, 2025	February 21, 2025	4 episodes	

==== Portuguese ====
Title	Genre	Premiere	Finale	Seasons	Notes
Funny Little Stories	Comedy	March 26, 2021	August 8, 2024	2 seasons, 10 episodes	
Uncoupled in Rio	Comedy	October 1, 2021		1 season, 8 episodes	
Lov3	Romantic comedy	February 18, 2022		1 season, 6 episodes	
September Mornings	Drama	June 25, 2021	September 23, 2022	2 seasons, 11 episodes	
Verdict	Crime drama	April 15, 2022		1 season, 6 episodes	
Elected	Comedy	October 7, 2022		1 season, 7 episodes	
Novela	Comedy	July 28, 2023		1 season, 8 episodes	
Love Is for the Strong	Action drama	November 17, 2023		1 season, 7 episodes	
Every Family	Comedy	July 12, 2024		1 season, 7 episodes	
Tremembé	Crime drama	October 31, 2025		5 episodes	

==== Spanish ====
Title	Genre	Premiere	Finale	Seasons	Notes
Diablo Guardián	Action drama	May 4, 2018	April 12, 2019	2 seasons, 18 episodes	
An Unknown Enemy	Political thriller	October 2, 2018	September 28, 2022	2 seasons, 14 episodes	
Little Coincidences (Note: These shows, despite being originals, are labeled as "Amazon Exclusive".)	Romantic comedy	December 7, 2018	February 5, 2021	3 seasons, 30 episodes	
El juego de las llaves	Comedy	August 16, 2019	February 14, 2024	3 seasons, 24 episodes	
El presidente	Sports drama	June 5, 2020		1 season, 8 episodes	
How to Survive Being Single	Comedy	June 26, 2020	March 22, 2023	3 seasons, 26 episodes	
La jauría	Mystery thriller	July 10, 2020	April 22, 2022	2 seasons, 16 episodes	
El candidato	Crime drama	July 17, 2020		1 season, 10 episodes	
Súbete a mi moto	Drama	October 9, 2020		1 season, 15 episodes	
The Legend of El Cid	Historical drama	December 18, 2020	July 15, 2021	2 seasons, 10 episodes	
3 caminos	Adventure	January 22, 2021		1 season, 8 episodes	
The Boarding School: Las Cumbres	Thriller drama	February 19, 2021	April 7, 2023	3 seasons, 24 episodes	
The Vineyard	Historical romance	March 26, 2021		1 season, 10 episodes	
Dom	Crime drama	June 4, 2021	May 24, 2024	3 seasons, 21 episodes	
S.O.Z.: Soldiers or Zombies	Horror	August 6, 2021		1 season, 8 episodes	
Maradona: Blessed Dream	Biopic drama	October 29, 2021		1 season, 10 episodes	
Porn and Ice Cream	Comedy	March 10, 2022	September 20, 2024	2 seasons, 14 episodes	
Yosi, the Regretful Spy	Thriller	April 28, 2022		2 seasons, 16 episodes	
Boundless	Historical drama	June 10, 2022		1 season, 6 episodes	
Supernova	Comedy drama	July 7, 2022		4 episodes	
News of a Kidnapping	Drama	August 11, 2022		6 episodes	
A Private Affair	Thriller comedy	September 16, 2022		1 season, 8 episodes	
Filthy Envy	Comedy drama	October 7, 2022		6 episodes	
El presidente: Corruption Game	Sports drama	November 4, 2022		1 season, 8 episodes	
The End of Love	Comedy drama	November 4, 2022	April 16, 2025	2 seasons, 18 episodes	
Out Loud	Comedy drama	November 11, 2022		1 season, 10 episodes	
The Head of Joaquín Murrieta	Western	February 17, 2023		1 season, 8 episodes	
Melody	Musical comedy drama	February 21, 2023	March 5, 2023	1 season, 13 episodes	
No Traces	Comedy thriller	March 17, 2023		1 season, 8 episodes	
Chavorrucos	Comedy	July 7, 2023		1 season, 8 episodes	
Misfortune	Romantic comedy	August 18, 2023		1 season, 8 episodes	
F#ck1Ng Social Media	Comedy	September 15, 2023		1 season, 8 episodes	
Memento mori	Thriller	October 27, 2023	August 1, 2025	3 seasons, 15 episodes	
Los Billis	Drama	November 3, 2023		1 season, 8 episodes	
Romancero	Supernatural horror	November 3, 2023		1 season, 6 episodes	
Los Farad	Crime thriller	December 12, 2023		1 season, 8 episodes	
Who Killed Him?	Thriller drama	May 24, 2024	June 7, 2024	6 episodes	
En fin	Post-apocalyptic comedy	September 13, 2024		1 season, 6 episodes	
Cromañón: The Night of the Fire	Drama	November 8, 2024		8 episodes	
Every Minute Counts	Drama	November 8, 2024	September 12, 2025	2 seasons, 20 episodes	
The Liberation	Drama	January 17, 2025		1 season, 7 episodes	
Mentiras, The Series	Musical comedy drama	June 13, 2025		1 season, 8 episodes	
Tell Me Your Name	Horror	October 31, 2025		1 season, 6 episodes	
Unburied	Supernatural drama	October 31, 2025		1 season, 7 episodes	

==== Swedish ====
Title	Genre	Premiere	Finale	Seasons	Notes
Toppen	Political satire	December 2, 2022		1 season, 6 episodes	
Jana: Marked for Life	Crime drama	April 19, 2024		1 season, 6 episodes	

==== Tamil ====
Title	Genre	Premiere	Finale	Seasons	Notes
Vella Raja	Crime drama	December 2, 2018		1 season, 10 episodes	
Putham Pudhu Kaalai Vidiyaadhaa	Drama anthology	January 14, 2022		1 season, 5 episodes	
Suzhal: The Vortex	Thriller	June 17, 2022	February 28, 2025	2 seasons, 16 episodes	
Engga Hostel	Comedy drama	January 27, 2023		1 season, 5 episodes	
Modern Love Chennai	Romantic comedy anthology	May 18, 2023		1 season, 6 episodes	
Sweet Kaaram Coffee	Drama	July 5, 2023		1 season, 8 episodes	
The Village	Horror	November 24, 2023		1 season, 6 episodes	
Inspector Rishi	Supernatural horror	March 29, 2024		1 season, 10 episodes	
Thalaivettiyaan Paalayam	Comedy drama	September 20, 2024		1 season, 8 episodes	
Snakes and Ladders	Coming of age action-adventure	October 18, 2024		1 season, 9 episodes	

==== Telugu ====
Title	Genre	Premiere	Finale	Seasons	Notes
Gangstars	Crime drama	June 1, 2018		1 season, 12 episodes	
Modern Love Hyderabad	Anthology	July 8, 2022		1 season, 6 episodes	
Hostel Days	Young adult drama	July 13, 2023		1 season, 5 episodes	
Kumari Srimathi	Drama	September 28, 2023		1 season, 7 episodes	
Dhootha	Horror mystery thriller	December 1, 2023		1 season, 8 episodes	
Vyooham	Action thriller	December 14, 2023		1 season, 8 episodes	
Bujji and Bhairava	Animated science fiction comedy	May 31, 2024		2 episodes	
Sivarapalli	Comedy drama	January 24, 2025		1 season, 8 episodes	
Arabia Kadali	Suspense drama	August 8, 2025		1 season, 8 episodes	

==== Other ====
Title	Genre	Premiere	Finale	Seasons	Language	Notes
Modern Love Amsterdam	Romantic comedy anthology	December 16, 2022		1 season, 6 episodes	Dutch	
Poacher	Crime drama	February 23, 2024		1 season, 8 episodes	Malayalam	

=== Unscripted ===
==== Docuseries ====
Title	Subject	Premiere	Finale	Seasons	Language	Notes
The New Yorker Presents	Investigative journalism	February 16, 2016	March 15, 2016	1 season, 11 episodes	English	
Invisible Tokyo	Culture	July 15, 2016	April 14, 2017	1 season, 8 episodes	Japanese	
All or Nothing	Sports	July 1, 2016	February 7, 2020	5 seasons, 40 episodes	English	
Eat the World with Emeril Lagasse	Travel	September 1, 2016		1 season, 6 episodes	English	
American Playboy: The Hugh Hefner Story	Biography	April 6, 2017		1 season, 10 episodes	English	
Long Strange Trip	Music	June 2, 2017		6 episodes	English	
Le Mans: Racing Is Everything	Sports	June 9, 2017		6 episodes	English	
Grand Prix Driver	Sports	February 9, 2018		4 episodes	English	
All or Nothing: The Michigan Wolverines	Sports	April 7, 2018		8 episodes	English	
All or Nothing: New Zealand All Blacks	Sports	June 1, 2018		6 episodes	English	
Six Dreams	Sports	July 26, 2018	October 2, 2020	2 seasons, 13 episodes	Spanish	
Eat. Race. Win.	Sports	July 27, 2018		1 season, 6 episodes	English	
Pistorius	True crime/Sports	August 1, 2018		4 episodes	English	
Harmony with A. R. Rahman	Travel	August 15, 2018		1 season, 6 episodes	English	
All or Nothing: Manchester City	Sports	August 17, 2018		8 episodes	English	
The Gymkhana Files	Sports	November 16, 2018	December 7, 2018	1 season, 6 episodes	English	
Inside Jokes	Comedy	November 30, 2018		1 season, 6 episodes	English	
Luis, el sabio del éxito	Sports	December 21, 2018		2 episodes	Spanish	
Lorena	True crime	February 15, 2019		4 episodes	English	
This Giant Beast That Is the Global Economy	Economics	February 22, 2019		1 season, 8 episodes	English	
This Is Football	Sports	August 2, 2019		6 episodes	English	
Free Meek	Social justice/Music	August 9, 2019		5 episodes	English	
Inside Borussia Dortmund	Sports	August 16, 2019	September 13, 2019	4 episodes	German	
Take Us Home: Leeds United	Sports	August 16, 2019	September 17, 2020	2 seasons, 8 episodes	English	
El corazón de Sergio Ramos	Sports	September 13, 2019	June 18, 2021	2 seasons, 14 episodes	Spanish	
Jestination Unknown	Travel	October 18, 2019		1 season, 6 episodes	Hindi	
James May: Our Man in...	Travel	January 3, 2020	January 5, 2024	3 seasons, 15 episodes	English	
All or Nothing: Brazil National Team	Sports	January 31, 2020		5 episodes	Portuguese	
Ted Bundy: Falling for a Killer	True crime	January 31, 2020		5 episodes	English	
Regular Heroes	Social issues	May 8, 2020	July 3, 2020	8 episodes	English	
De la vida al plato	Cooking	July 24, 2020		1 season, 8 episodes	Spanish	
The Last Narc	True crime	July 31, 2020		4 episodes	English	
All or Nothing: Tottenham Hotspur	Sports	August 31, 2020	September 14, 2020	9 episodes	English	
Fernando	Sports	September 25, 2020	August 27, 2021	2 seasons, 9 episodes	English; Spanish	
The Challenge: ETA	Global affairs/Politics	October 30, 2020		8 episodes	Spanish	
James May: Oh Cook!	Cooking show	November 13, 2020	May 24, 2023	2 seasons, 14 episodes	English	
Making Their Mark	Sports	March 12, 2021		1 season, 7 episodes	English	
Head Above Water	Sports	June 4, 2021		4 episodes	English	
Chivas: El rebaño sagrado	Sports	June 18, 2021		4 episodes	Spanish	
LuLaRich	True crime	September 10, 2021		4 episodes	English	
Dinner Club	Cooking/Travel	September 24, 2021	November 20, 2024	3 seasons, 16 episodes	Italian	
All or Nothing: Toronto Maple Leafs	Sports	October 1, 2021		5 episodes	English	
Spain's Elite Police: Beyond Limits	Law enforcement	October 15, 2021		1 season, 8 episodes	Spanish	
FC Bayern: Behind the Legend	Sports	November 2, 2021		6 episodes	German	
Always Jane	LGBT	November 12, 2021		4 episodes	English	
Everybody Loves Natti	Music	November 18, 2021		6 episodes	English	
All or Nothing: Juventus	Sports	November 24, 2021		8 episodes	English	
The Ferragnez	Docu-reality	December 9, 2021	May 24 2023	2 seasons, 15 episodes	Italian	
Sainz: Live to Compete	Sports	December 2, 2021		6 episodes	Spanish; English	
Sons of the Soil: Jaipur Pink Panthers	Sports	December 4, 2020		5 episodes	Hindi	
Simeone: Living Match by Match	Sports	January 23, 2022		6 episodes	Spanish	
Phat Tuesdays: The Era of Hip Hop Comedy	Stand-up comedy	February 4, 2022		3 episodes	English	
The Challenge: 11M	Global affairs/Politics	March 10, 2022		4 episodes	Spanish	
The Unsolved Murder of Beverly Lynn Smith	True crime	May 6, 2022		4 episodes	English	
The Kids in the Hall: Comedy Punks	Comedy/Television	May 20, 2022		2 episodes	English	
Backstage with Katherine Ryan	Stand-up comedy	June 9, 2022		1 season, 6 episodes	English	
At Home With the Gils	Music	June 24, 2022	June 30, 2023	2 seasons, 11 episodes	Portuguese	
All or Nothing: Arsenal	Sports	August 4, 2022	August 18, 2022	8 episodes	English	
MotoGP: Unlimited	Sports	August 4, 2022		1 season, 8 episodes	English	
Academy Dreams: Leeds United	Sports	September 23, 2022		6 episodes	English	
Life After	Sports	October 18, 2022		8 episodes	English	
The Confession	True crime	November 25, 2022		2 episodes	English	
Coach Prime	Sports	December 29, 2022	January 7, 2025	3 seasons, 15 episodes	English	
FC Barcelona: A New Era	Sports	December 28, 2022	September 6, 2023	2 seasons, 9 episodes	Spanish	
Cinema Marte Dum Tak	Film	January 16, 2023		6 episodes	Hindi	
Marc Márquez: All In	Sports	February 20, 2023		5 episodes	English	
Redefined: J. R. Smith	Sports	April 4, 2023		4 episodes	English	
Dancing on the Grave	True crime	April 19, 2023		4 episodes	Hindi	
Laughing on the Inside	Stand-up comedy	May 26, 2023		1 season, 5 episodes	Spanish	
The Ride	Sports	May 30, 2023		8 episodes	English	
Shiny Happy People	Religious fundamentalism/True crime	June 2, 2023	July 23, 2025	2 seasons, 7 episodes	English	
Joko Winterscheidt Presents: Climate Change – The World's Most Dangerous Show	Climate change	June 7, 2023		1 season, 6 episodes	German	
Surf Girls Hawaiʻi	Sports	July 18, 2023		4 episodes	English	
We Are Newcastle United	Sports	August 11, 2023	August 30, 2023	4 episodes	English	
Wayne Shorter: Zero Gravity	Music	August 25, 2023		3 episodes	English	
One Shot: Overtime Elite	Sports	September 5, 2023	October 29, 2024	3 seasons, 16 episodes	English	
All or Nothing: The German National Team in Qatar	Sports	September 8, 2023		4 episodes	German	
The Fake Sheikh	True crime	September 26, 2023		3 episodes	English	
Desperately Seeking Soulmate: Escaping Twin Flames Universe	True crime	October 6, 2023		3 episodes	English	
The Greatest Show Never Made	True crime	October 11, 2023		3 episodes	English	
Mud, Sweat and Tears: Premiership Rugby	Sports	October 12, 2023		2 episodes	English	
Rainbow Rishta	LGBT culture	November 6, 2023		1 season, 6 episodes	English	
Dance Life	Dance	January 19, 2024		5 episodes	English	
Love Storiyaan	Relationships	February 14, 2024		1 season, 6 episodes	Hindi	
Friends in Low Places	Music	March 7, 2024	April 10, 2024	1 season, 6 episodes	English	
99	Sports	May 17, 2024		3 episodes	English	
Angry Young Men	Bollywood film	August 20, 2024		3 episodes	Hindi	
Hunting a Monster	True crime	September 6, 2024		3 episodes	Spanish	
The Money Game	Sports	September 10, 2024		6 episodes	English	
Courtois, the Return of the Number 1	Sports	September 20, 2024		4 episodes	Spanish	
The Tragically Hip: No Dress Rehearsal	Music	September 20, 2024		4 episodes	English	
Evolution of the Black Quarterback	Sports	September 24, 2024		3 episodes	English	
Ingebrigtsen: Born to Run	Sports	September 19, 2024	October 4, 2024	6 episodes	Norwegian	
Medina: The Celebrity Scammer	Comedy/True crime	October 18, 2024		5 episodes	Spanish	
Game 7	Sports	October 22, 2024		1 season, 5 episodes	English	
The Pasta Queen	Cooking/Travel	October 24, 2024		1 season, 13 episodes	English	
In Cold Water: The Shelter Bay Mystery	True crime	November 12, 2024		3 episodes	English	
El circo de los muchachos	History	November 22, 2024		5 episodes	Spanish	
It's in the Game: Madden NFL	Video games	November 26, 2024		4 episodes	English	
Hard North	Survivalism	November 29, 2024		1 season, 8 episodes	English	
Glitter and Greed: The Lisa Frank Story	Business	December 5, 2024		4 episodes	English	
Skoczkowie	Sports	January 10, 2025		5 episodes	Polish	
50,000 First Dates	Neurology	February 11, 2025		2 episodes	English	
For the Win: NWSL	Sports	March 6, 2025		4 episodes	English	
First to the Finish	Sports	March 25, 2025		3 episodes	English	
Calleja en el espacio	Spaceflight	February 3, 2025		4 episodes	Spanish	
Spy High	Privacy law/Technology	April 8, 2025		4 episodes	English	
Octopus!	Nature	May 8, 2025		2 episodes	English	
Earnhardt	Sports	May 22, 2025	May 29, 2025	4 episodes	English	
In Transit	LGBT rights in India	June 13, 2025		1 season, 4 episodes	English; Hindi	
Romcon: Who the F**k Is Jason Porter?	True crime	June 13, 2025		2 episodes	English	
Esports World Cup: Level Up	Sports	June 6, 2025	June 28, 2025	5 episodes	English	
Surf Girls: International	Sports	July 17, 2025		5 episodes	English	
Justice on Trial	Judiciary	July 21, 2025		1 season, 8 episodes	English	
Built in Birmingham: Brady & the Blues	Sports	August 1, 2025		5 episodes	English	
Taurasi	Sports	August 7, 2025		3 episodes	English	
Abandoned: The Woman in the Decaying House	True crime	August 15, 2025		3 episodes	Portuguese	
The Home Team: NY Jets	Sports	August 21, 2025		6 episodes	English	
Cocaine Quarterback: Signal-Caller for the Cartel	Sports/True crime	September 25, 2025		3 episodes	English	
Hollywood Hustler: Glitz, Glam, Scam	True crime	October 17, 2025		3 episodes	English	
Allen Iv3rson	Sports	October 23, 2025		3 episodes	English	
Soul Power: The Legend of the American Basketball Association	Sports	February 12, 2026		4 episodes	English	
Jesy Nelson: Life After Little Mix	Celebrity/Music	February 13, 2026		6 episodes	English	
Final Siren: Inside the AFL	Sports	February 27, 2026		4 episodes	English	
Killing Grounds: The Gilgo Beach Murders	True crime	April 22, 2026		4 episodes	English	
Murder 101	True crime	July 13, 2026		3 episodes	English	
Marília Mendonça: All the Feels	Music	October 16, 2026		4 episodes	Portuguese	
Melania, The Series	Biography	November 20, 2026		2 episodes	English	

==== Reality ====
Title	Genre	Premiere	Finale	Seasons	Language	Notes
Hitoshi Matsumoto Presents Documental	Stand-up comedy competition	November 30, 2016	December 22, 2023	13 seasons, 59 episodes (Note: Seasons 6 onward are only available in select territories.)	Japanese	
Caligula	Docu-comedy	June 9, 2017		2 seasons, 38 episodes	Japanese	
Sentosha: Battle Wheels	Reality competition	October 6, 2017		2 seasons, 10 episodes	Japanese	
The Remix	Music competition	March 9, 2018	May 4, 2018	1 season, 10 episodes	Hindi	
Comicstaan	Stand-up comedy competition	July 13, 2018	July 15, 2022	3 seasons, 25 episodes	Hindi	
This Is Family (seasons 1–4)	Reality	September 28, 2018	January 29, 2021	4 seasons, 21 episodes	English	(Note: Moved to Facebook Watch for season 5)
LOL: Last One Laughing Mexico	Stand-up comedy competition	December 13, 2018	December 20, 2024	7 seasons, 38 episodes	Spanish	
Skulls and Roses	Reality competition	August 29, 2019		1 season, 10 episodes	Hindi	
Wild and Free	Docu-soap	March 20, 2020	February 14, 2025	5 seasons, 57 episodes	Portuguese	
Making the Cut	Fashion competition	March 27, 2020	August 19, 2022	3 seasons, 26 episodes	English	
LOL: Last One Laughing Australia	Stand-up comedy competition	June 18, 2020	July 3, 2020	1 season, 6 episodes	English	
World's Toughest Race: Eco-Challenge Fiji	Reality competition	August 14, 2020		1 season, 10 episodes	English	
Comicstaan Semma Comedy Pa	Stand-up comedy competition	September 11, 2020		1 season, 8 episodes	Tamil	
The Pack	Reality competition	November 20, 2020		1 season, 10 episodes	English	
The Great Escapists	Docu-comedy	January 29, 2021		1 season, 6 episodes	English	
LOL: Hasse Toh Phasse	Stand-up comedy competition	April 28, 2021	April 30, 2021	1 season, 6 episodes	Hindi; English	
Luxe Listings Sydney	Reality	July 9, 2021	October 21, 2022	3 seasons, 18 episodes	English	
LOL - Enga Siri Paappom	Stand-up comedy competition	August 26, 2021	August 27, 2021	1 season, 6 episodes	Tamil	
Tampa Baes	Reality	November 5, 2021		1 season, 8 episodes	English	
Celebrity Hunted: Germany	Reality competition	December 2, 2021	December 17, 2021	1 season, 6 episodes	German	
LOL: Last One Laughing Canada	Stand-up comedy competition	February 18, 2022	March 4, 2022	1 season, 6 episodes	English	
Lizzo's Watch Out for the Big Grrrls	Dancing competition	March 25, 2022		1 season, 10 episodes	English	
Lovestruck High	Dating show	May 18, 2022	May 31, 2022	1 season, 8 episodes	English	
The One That Got Away	Dating show	June 24, 2022		1 season, 10 episodes	English	
Forever Summer: Hamptons	Reality	July 15, 2022		1 season, 8 episodes	English	
Cosmic Love	Dating show	August 12, 2022		1 season, 10 episodes	English	
Written in the Stars	Dating show	November 27, 2022	January 22, 2023	1 season, 12 episodes	Portuguese	
Drag Den	Drag competition	December 8, 2022	March 7, 2024	2 seasons, 16 episodes	Filipino; English	
Dr. Seuss Baking Challenge	Baking competition	December 13, 2022		1 season, 8 episodes	English	
LOL: Last One Laughing Sweden	Stand-up comedy competition	December 28, 2022	December 4, 2024	3 seasons, 18 episodes	Swedish	
Cosmic Love France	Dating show	January 6, 2023	January 13, 2023	1 season, 20 episodes	French	
Queens on the Run	Drag competition	April 14, 2023	May 25, 2023	1 season, 9 episodes	Portuguese	
Takeshi's Castle	Reality game show	April 21, 2023	April 28, 2023	1 season, 8 episodes	Japanese	
Love Transit	Dating show	June 16, 2023	June 29, 2023	1 season, 8 episodes	Japanese	
Prank or Tank	Docu-comedy	June 16, 2023	October 4, 2024	2 seasons, 12 episodes	Spanish	
LOL: Last One Laughing Naija	Stand-up comedy competition	July 14, 2023	July 28, 2023	1 season, 6 episodes	English	
LOL: Last One Laughing... or Screaming France	Stand-up comedy competition	October 26, 2023	November 2, 2023	1 season, 5 episodes	French	
Twin Love	Dating show	November 17, 2023		1 season, 9 episodes	English	
LOL: Last One Laughing – Denmark	Stand-up comedy competition	December 29, 2023	December 11, 2024	2 seasons, 12 episodes	Danish	
LOL: Last One Laughing – Norway	Stand-up comedy competition	December 29, 2023	December 11, 2024	2 seasons, 12 episodes	Norwegian	
LOL: Last One Laughing Ireland	Stand-up comedy competition	January 19, 2024		1 season, 6 episodes	English	
LOL: Last One Laughing South Africa	Stand-up comedy competition	February 16, 2024		1 season, 6 episodes	English	
LOL Talent Show: Be Funny and You're In!	Stand-up comedy competition	February 22, 2024	February 27, 2025	2 seasons, 9 episodes	Italian	
Going Home with Tyler Cameron	Home renovation	April 18, 2024		1 season, 8 episodes	English	
Luxe Listings Toronto	Property management	April 26, 2024		1 season, 7 episodes	English	
The GOAT	Reality competition	May 9, 2024	June 27, 2024	1 season, 10 episodes	English	
LOL: Last One Laughing Thailand	Stand-up comedy competition	July 4, 2024		1 season, 6 episodes	Thai	
LOL: Last One Laughing Indonesia	Stand-up comedy competition	July 11, 2024		1 season, 6 episodes	Indonesian	
Follow Kar Lo Yaar	Docu-soap	August 23, 2024		1 season, 9 episodes	Hindi	
Elisabeth Rioux: Unfiltered	Docu-reality	September 6, 2024		1 season, 6 episodes	French	
Dream Deals	Docu-soap	September 13, 2024		1 season, 6 episodes	German	
The Tribe	Docu-soap	October 4, 2024		1 season, 9 episodes	Hindi	
Killer Cakes	Baking competition	October 8, 2024		2 episodes	English	
LOL: Last One Laughing Germany – Halloween Special	Stand-up comedy competition	October 21, 2024		3 episodes	German	
The Golden Combi	Comedy reality competition	October 31, 2024		1 season, 5 episodes	Japanese	
Dinner Club: Germany	Cooking/Travel	January 2, 2025		1 season, 6 episodes	German	
The Tinellis	Docu-soap	January 17, 2025		1 season, 8 episodes	Spanish	
Tom Green Country	Docu-comedy	January 31, 2025		1 season, 4 episodes	English	
Sweethearts	Dating show	February 13, 2025		1 season, 10 episodes	English	
Liars Club	Comedy reality competition	March 13, 2025		1 season, 6 episodes	French	
Wear Whatever the F You Want	Makeover reality	April 29, 2025		1 season, 8 episodes	English	
Can You Summon 100 Friends?	Reality competition	August 1, 2025		1 season, 6 episodes	Japanese	
Holiday Crush	Docu-reality	September 4, 2025		1 season, 6 episodes	Italian	

==== Variety ====
Title	Genre	Premiere	Finale	Seasons	Language	Notes
Chris Tall Presents	Stand-up comedy	September 27, 2019		1 season, 6 episodes	German	
One Mic Stand	Stand-up comedy	November 14, 2019	October 22, 2021	2 seasons, 10 episodes	Hindi	
Pan y Circo	Talk show	August 7, 2020	October 8, 2021	1 season, 8 episodes	Spanish	
Prime Rewind: Inside The Boys	Aftershow	August 28, 2020	October 9, 2020	1 season, 9 episodes	English	
NFL Next	Sports talk show	October 6, 2020	October 6, 2021	2 seasons, 24 episodes	English	
Comedy Island Thailand	Improv comedy game show	August 22, 2023	September 6, 2023	1 season, 6 episodes	Thai	
Comedy Island Philippines	Improv comedy game show	August 31, 2023	September 6, 2023	1 season, 6 episodes	Filipino	
Comedy Island Indonesia	Improv comedy game show	November 9, 2023		1 season, 6 episodes	Indonesian	
Comedy Island Japan	Improv comedy game show	November 22, 2023		1 season, 6 episodes	Japanese	
Counsel Culture	Talk show	June 6, 2024		1 season, 9 episodes	English	
Influenced	Talk show	August 1, 2024		1 season, 10 episodes	English	
Amazon Wish List Games	Game show	November 20, 2024		1 season, 5 episodes	English	
The Rana Daggubati Show	Talk show	November 23, 2024	January 11, 2025	1 season, 8 episodes	Telugu	
Are You Smarter than a Celebrity?	Game show	October 16, 2024	February 12, 2025	1 season, 20 episodes	English	
Dish It Out	Cooking show/Talk show	September 5, 2025	September 18, 2025	1 season, 32 episodes	English	
Jury Duty Presents: Behind the Scenes of Company Retreat	Aftershow	April 10, 2026		1 season, 10 episodes	English	

=== Co-productions ===
These shows have been commissioned by Amazon in cooperation with a partner network.

Title	Genre	Partner	Premiere	Finale	Seasons	Language	Notes
Ripper Street (seasons 3–5)	Drama	BBC One (season 3)/United Kingdom; BBC Two (seasons 4–5)/United Kingdom	November 14, 2014	April 12, 2017	3 seasons, 21 episodes	English	
The Collection	Period drama	France 3/France	September 2, 2016	November 19, 2017	1 season, 8 episodes	English	
Dino Dana	Children's action-adventure	TVOKids/Canada	May 26, 2017	September 4, 2020	3 seasons, 51 episodes	English	
Electric Dreams	Science fiction drama anthology	Channel 4/United Kingdom	January 12, 2018		10 episodes	English	
Britannia (season 1)	Historical drama	Sky Atlantic/United Kingdom	January 18, 2018		1 season, 9 episodes	English	(Note: Amazon pulled out after series 1. Sky co-produced series 2–3 with the American network Epix.)
Falco	Drama	Telemundo/United States	July 16, 2018		1 season, 14 episodes	Spanish	
Vanity Fair	Drama	ITV/United Kingdom	December 21, 2018		7 episodes	English	
The Widow	Drama	ITV/United Kingdom	March 1, 2019		1 season, 8 episodes	English	
Good Omens	Fantasy comedy	BBC Two/United Kingdom	May 31, 2019	May 13, 2026	3 seasons, 13 episodes	English	
The Feed	Science fiction drama	Virgin Media/United Kingdom	November 22, 2019		1 season, 10 episodes	English	
Clifford the Big Red Dog	Children's animation	PBS Kids/United States	December 6, 2019	February 12, 2021	3 seasons, 39 episodes	English	
Caronte	Legal drama	Cuatro/Spain	March 6, 2020		1 season, 13 episodes	Spanish	
ZeroZeroZero	Drama	Sky Italia/Italy; Canal+/France	March 6, 2020		8 episodes	English; Italian	
The Pale Horse	Drama	BBC One/United Kingdom	March 13, 2020		2 episodes	English	
Inés of My Soul	Historical drama	RTVE/Spain; Boomerang TV/Spain; Chilevisión/Chile	July 31, 2020		8 episodes	Spanish	
Small Axe	Anthology drama	BBC One/United Kingdom	November 20, 2020	December 18, 2020	1 season, 5 episodes	English	
Frank of Ireland	Comedy	Channel 4/United Kingdom	April 16, 2021		1 season, 6 episodes	English	
Flack (season 2)	Dark comedy	W/United Kingdom	June 11, 2021		1 season, 6 episodes	English	
Chloe	Psychological thriller	BBC One/United Kingdom	June 24, 2022		6 episodes	English	
The English	Epic Western	BBC Two/United Kingdom	November 11, 2022		6 episodes	English	
Riches	Drama	ITVX/United Kingdom	December 2, 2022		1 season, 6 episodes	English	
Island	Fantasy action thriller	TVING/South Korea	December 30, 2022	March 10, 2023	12 episodes	Korean	
Apartment 404	Reality game show	tvN/South Korea	February 23, 2024	April 12, 2024	1 season, 8 episodes	Korean	
Davey & Jonesie's Locker	Teen comedy	Hulu/United States	March 22, 2024		1 season, 10 episodes	English	
Dino Dex	Children's action-adventure	TVOKids, TFO and Knowledge Network/Canada	October 20, 2024		3 seasons, 26 episodes	English	
Anaon	Fantasy thriller	France Télévisions/France	April 4, 2025		1 season, 6 episodes	French	
Confidence Queen	Crime comedy	Coupang Play and TV Chosun/South Korea	September 6, 2025	October 12, 2025	12 episodes	Korean	
Spider-Noir	Superhero noir	MGM+	May 27, 2026		1 season, 8 episodes	English	

=== Continuations ===
These shows have been picked up by Amazon for additional seasons after having aired previous seasons on another network.

Title	Genre	Prev. network(s)	Premiere	Finale	Seasons	Language	Notes
The Expanse (seasons 4–6)	Hard science fiction	Syfy	December 13, 2019	January 14, 2022	3 seasons, 26 episodes	English	
Absentia (season 3)	Crime thriller	AXN	July 17, 2020		1 season, 10 episodes	English	
The Kids in the Hall (season 6)	Sketch comedy	CBC Television (Canada) (seasons 1–5); HBO (United States) (seasons 1–3); CBS (United States) (seasons 4–5)	May 13, 2022		1 season, 8 episodes	English	
Pantheon (season 2)	Adult animated science fiction drama	AMC+	October 15, 2023		1 season, 8 episodes	English	
Popstars (season 6)	Music competition	M6 (seasons 1–4); C8 (season 5)	September 12, 2024	September 19, 2024	1 season, 8 episodes	French	
Bosch: Legacy (season 3)	Crime drama	Amazon Freevee	March 27, 2025	April 17, 2025	1 season, 10 episodes	English	
America's Test Kitchen: The Next Generation (season 2)	Cooking competition	Amazon Freevee	April 1, 2025		1 season, 10 episodes	English	

=== Specials ===
Title	Genre	Premiere
Borat: VHS Cassette of Material Deemed "Sub-acceptable" by Kazakhstan Ministry of Censorship and Circumcision	Comedy	May 24, 2021
Invincible: Atom Eve	Superhero drama	July 21, 2023
Make Me Scream	Horror reality competition	October 3, 2023
Dinner Party Diaries with José Andrés	Cooking show/Talk show	March 19, 2024

== Regional original programming ==
=== Drama ===
Title	Genre	Premiere	Finale	Seasons	Prime Video exclusive region	Language	Notes
Face: Cyber Hanzai Tokusouhan	Mystery drama	July 11, 2017	September 12, 2017	1 season, 10 episodes	Japan	Japanese	
Chase	Mystery drama	December 22, 2017	January 19, 2018	2 seasons, 12 episodes	Japan	Japanese	
Shiro to Kiiro	Romance drama	February 28, 2018	April 3, 2018	1 season, 25 episodes	Japan	Japanese	
Deutschland 86	Thriller	October 19, 2018		1 season, 10 episodes	Germany	German	
Alex Rider	Spy thriller	June 4, 2020	April 5, 2024	3 seasons, 24 episodes	All territories except United Kingdom and United States	English	
Tell Me Your Secrets	Thriller drama	February 19, 2021		1 season, 10 episodes	Australia, Canada, New Zealand and United States	English	
Monterossi – La serie	Crime drama	January 17, 2022	November 10, 2023	2 seasons, 11 episodes	Italy	Italian	
One Good Day	Action	November 15, 2022	December 22, 2022	1 season, 6 episodes	Hong Kong, Southeast Asia and Taiwan	Filipino	
German Crime Story: Gefesselt	Crime drama	January 13, 2023		1 season, 6 episodes	Germany	German	
Cattleya Killer	Psychological thriller	June 1, 2023		1 season, 6 episodes	Hong Kong, Southeast Asia, Taiwan, and other selected territories	Filipino	
Fifteen-Love	Sports drama	July 21, 2023		1 season, 6 episodes	United Kingdom	English	
Amar é Para os Fortes	Crime drama	November 17, 2023		1 season, 7 episodes	Brazil	Portuguese	
The Aces	Sports drama	December 21, 2023	December 28, 2023	1 season, 8 episodes	Southeast Asia	Indonesian	
Heartless	Crime drama	July 19, 2024		8 episodes	Spain	Spanish	
A Very Royal Scandal	Political drama	September 19, 2024		3 episodes	Australia, Canada, New Zealand, United Kingdom and United States	English	
Nautilus	Adventure drama	October 25, 2024		10 episodes	Ireland and United Kingdom	English	
Zorro	Historical action adventure	January 19, 2024		1 season, 10 episodes	Latin America, Portugal, Spain, and United States	Spanish	
Beasts Like Us	Horror comedy	February 14, 2024		1 season, 8 episodes	Austria and Germany	German	
Tengo que morir todas las noches	Drama	June 7, 2024		1 season, 8 episodes	Latin America	Spanish	
Sul Più Bello – La Serie	Romantic comedy	July 29, 2024		1 season, 6 episodes	Italy	Italian	
Classified	Coming-of-age drama	August 22, 2024		1 season, 8 episodes	Selected territories	English	
Solo	Coming-of-age drama	August 23, 2024		1 season, 4 episodes	Nordics	Norwegian	
Blind Spot	Crime drama	January 24, 2025		4 episodes	Nordics	Swedish	
The Narrow Road to the Deep North	Period drama	April 18, 2025		5 episodes	Australia, Canada, New Zealand and United States	English	

=== Comedy ===
Title	Genre	Premiere	Finale	Seasons	Prime Video exclusive region	Language	Notes
Baby Steps	Sports romantic comedy	July 22, 2016	September 23, 2016	1 season, 10 episodes	Japan	Japanese	
Gaki Rock: Sakusa roku-ku ninjo monogatari	Comedy drama	April 14, 2017	June 23, 2017	1 season, 12 episodes	Japan	Japanese	
Konta Teru's Legal Recipes	Cooking comedy	March 6, 2018	April 24, 2018	1 season, 10 episodes	Japan	Japanese	
Made in Italy	Comedy drama	September 23, 2019		1 season, 8 episodes	Italy	Italian	
Scatola Nera	Crime comedy	November 25, 2019	December 7, 2020	2 seasons, 16 episodes	Italy	Italian	
Shonan Junai Gumi	Action comedy drama	February 28, 2020		1 season, 8 episodes	Japan	Japanese	
Der Beischläfer	Comedy	May 29, 2020	November 12, 2021	2 seasons, 14 episodes	Germany	German	
Binge Reloaded	Comedy	December 4, 2020	January 14, 2022	2 seasons, 16 episodes	Germany	German	
Todo por Lucy	Sitcom	November 30, 2021	March 31, 2022	2 seasons, 20 episodes	Latin America and United States	Spanish	
Die Discounter	Comedy	December 17, 2021	December 23, 2024	4 seasons, 40 episodes	Germany	German	
Sex Zimmer, Küche, Bad	Comedy	December 23, 2021		1 season, 8 episodes	Germany	German	
Ten Percent	Comedy drama	April 29, 2022		1 season, 8 episodes	United Kingdom	English	
Me contro Te – La famiglia reale	Family comedy	September 29, 2022	December 20, 2023	2 seasons, 16 episodes	Italy	Italian	
Friedliche Weihnachten	Comedy	December 8, 2022		1 season, 6 episodes	Germany	German	
Sono Lillo	Comedy	January 5, 2023	September 19, 2024	2 seasons, 14 episodes	Italy	Italian	
Last Exit Schinkenstraße	Comedy	October 27, 2023		1 season, 6 episodes	Germany	German	
Dead Hot	Comedy thriller	March 1, 2024		1 season, 6 episodes	United Kingdom and Ireland	English	
STHLM Blackout	Action comedy	May 3, 2024	May 10, 2024	1 season, 4 episodes	Nordics	Swedish	
The Office	Sitcom	October 18, 2024		1 season, 8 episodes	All markets except United States	English	
Gerry Star	Comedy mockumentary	January 10, 2025		1 season, 8 episodes	Germany	German	
Drunter und Drüber	Dark comedy	May 9, 2025		1 season, 8 episodes	Germany	German	
In the Name of Love	Historical comedy drama	September 5, 2025		1 season, 8 episodes	Nordics	Norwegian	
Top End Bub	Comedy drama	September 12, 2025		1 season, 8 episodes	Australia and New Zealand	English	

=== Animation ===
==== Adult animation ====
Title	Genre	Premiere	Finale	Seasons	Prime Video exclusive region	Language	Notes
Baahubali: The Lost Legends	Fantasy adventure	April 19, 2017	April 10, 2020	5 seasons, 71 episodes	India	Hindi	
Il Baracchino	Comedy	June 3, 2025		1 season, 6 episodes	Italy	Italian	

==== Kids & family ====
Title	Genre	Premiere	Finale	Seasons	Prime Video exclusive region	Language	Notes
Selfie with Bajrangi	Action comedy	June 1, 2017	March 31, 2018	2 seasons, 104 episodes	India	Hindi	(Note: Moved to Hotstar)
Inspector Chingum	Action comedy	April 27, 2018	April 2, 2019	2 seasons, 54 episodes	India	Hindi	

=== Unscripted ===
==== Docuseries ====
Title	Subject	Premiere	Finale	Seasons	Prime Video exclusive region	Language	Notes
Prime Japan	Culture	May 15, 2016	May 20, 2017	1 season, 12 episodes	Japan	Japanese	
Ishi-chan no Sake Tabi	Food/Travel	February 3, 2017	June 9, 2017	1 season, 20 episodes	Japan	Japanese	
Huesca, más allá de un sueño	Sports	October 1, 2019		8 episodes	Spain	Spanish	
Una vida, una cena	Culinary art	December 17, 2019		1 season, 6 episodes	Spain	Spanish	
Soccer Players Living Abroad	Sports	June 5, 2020		1 season, 4 episodes	Spain	Spanish	
True Story	Comedy	June 26, 2020	September 29, 2021	1 season, 6 episodes	France	French	
PSG City of Lights, 50 Years of Legend	Sports	September 15, 2020	September 10, 2021	2 seasons, 4 episodes	France	French	
Jan Ullrich – Der Gejagte	Sports	June 25, 2022		4 episodes	Germany	German	
Three Mothers, Two Babies and a Scandal	True crime	October 21, 2022		3 episodes	United Kingdom	English	
Good Rivals	Sports	November 24, 2022	December 1, 2022	3 episodes	Mexico and United States	English; Spanish	
One for All	Sports	May 25, 2023		4 episodes	France	French	
Dead in the Water	True crime	February 28, 2024		3 episodes	Australia, Canada, Ireland, New Zealand, Netherlands, Nordics, and United Kingdom	English	
Hope on the Street	Music/Breakdance	March 28, 2024	April 12, 2024	6 episodes	Worldwide except South Korea	Korean	
German Cocaine Cowboy	True crime docudrama	November 10, 2024		4 episodes	Germany	German	
World's Strangest Jobs	Comedy/Occupations	November 24, 2024		1 season, 8 episodes	African territories	English	
Doda	Music	February 20, 2026		3 episodes	Poland	Polish	
A Beautiful Obsession	Sports	August 19, 2026		4 episodes	Selected territories	English	
Meet the Owens	Sports	August 28, 2026		6 episodes	Ireland and United Kingdom	English	

==== Reality ====
Title	Genre	Premiere	Finale	Seasons	Prime Video exclusive region	Language	Notes
Harumi's Kitchen	Cooking show	November 4, 2016	August 4, 2017	1 season, 12 episodes	Japan	Japanese	
Hitoshi Matsumoto Presents Freeze	Game show	September 19, 2018	July 10, 2020	2 seasons, 10 episodes	Japan	Japanese	
Hear Me. Love Me.	Dating game show	September 28, 2018		1 season, 10 episodes	India	Hindi	
Love Island France	Reality competition	March 2, 2020	March 16, 2020	1 season, 15 episodes	France	French	(Note: Moved to W9.)
Celebrity Hunted: Italy	Survival competition	March 13, 2020	May 6, 2024	4 seasons, 24 episodes	Italy	Italian	
The Masked Singer Japan	Music competition	September 3, 2021	August 25, 2022	2 seasons, 18 episodes	Japan	Japanese	
Celebrity Hunted: France – Manhunt	Survival competition	October 29, 2021	November 24, 2023	3 seasons, 18 episodes	France	French	
Celebrity Bake Off España	Baking competition	December 16, 2021		1 season, 10 episodes	Spain	Spanish	(Note: Moved to La 1.)
Bake Off Japan	Baking competition	April 22, 2022	April 29, 2022	1 season, 8 episodes	Japan	Japanese	
Dulceida al desnudo	Docu-soap	November 3, 2022	April 2, 2022	2 seasons, 8 episodes	Spain	Spanish	
The Bridge: Denmark	Survival competition	November 4, 2022	November 25, 2022	1 season, 6 episodes	Denmark	Danish	
The Bridge: Finland	Survival competition	November 4, 2022	November 25, 2022	1 season, 6 episodes	Finland	Finnish	
The Bridge: Norway	Survival competition	November 4, 2022	November 25, 2022	1 season, 6 episodes	Norway	Norwegian	
The Bridge: Sweden	Survival competition	November 4, 2022	November 25, 2022	1 season, 6 episodes	Sweden	Swedish	
Ägd av Danny	Prank show	December 16, 2022	November 17, 2023	2 seasons, 12 episodes	Sweden	Swedish	
Nicklas Pranker	Prank show	December 16, 2022	November 17, 2023	2 seasons, 12 episodes	Denmark	Danish	
Saara Aalto Pränkkää Suomea	Prank show	December 16, 2022	January 20, 2023	1 season, 6 episodes	Finland	Finnish	
Spice of Life med Stian Blipp	Prank show	December 16, 2022		1 season, 6 episodes	Norway	Norwegian	
The World Cook	Cooking competition	December 17, 2022	March 16, 2024	2 seasons, 12 episodes	Ireland and United Kingdom	English	
En Svedig Date	Dating show	December 26, 2022		1 season, 6 episodes	Denmark	Danish	
Heit	Dating show	December 26, 2022		1 season, 6 episodes	Norway	Norwegian	
Heta Hjärtan	Dating show	December 26, 2022		1 season, 6 episodes	Sweden	Swedish	
Lemmenlöylyt Virallinen	Dating show	December 26, 2022		1 season, 6 episodes	Finland	Finnish	
Good Luck Guys: Denmark	Survival dating competition	January 20, 2023	October 25, 2024	3 seasons, 24 episodes	Denmark	Danish	
Good Luck Guys: Finland	Survival dating competition	January 20, 2023		1 season, 8 episodes	Finland	Finnish	
Good Luck Guys: Norway	Survival dating competition	January 20, 2023	October 25, 2024	3 seasons, 24 episodes	Norway	Norwegian	
Good Luck Guys: Sweden	Survival dating competition	January 20, 2023	October 25, 2024	3 seasons, 24 episodes	Sweden	Swedish	
Parneviks All In!	Reality	November 23, 2023	December 8, 2023	1 season, 5 episodes	Sweden	Swedish	
Date My Mate	Dating game show	March 1, 2023		1 season, 6 episodes	Ireland and United Kingdom	English	
Bingo & Julia	Celebrity docu-soap	August 24, 2023	April 5, 2024	2 seasons, 14 episodes	Sweden	Swedish	
Karaoke Night	Reality competition	January 4, 2024		1 season, 4 episodes	Italy	Italian	
Hot Mess Summer	Reality	February 7, 2024		1 season, 6 episodes	Ireland and United Kingdom	English	
Married to the Game	Sports docu-soap	February 23, 2024	April 8, 2025	2 seasons, 12 episodes	Ireland and United Kingdom	English	
Star Kitchen mit Tim Raue	Food docu-reality	June 1, 2024		1 season, 6 episodes	Austria and Germany	German	
Temptation Island Mexico	Dating show	July 5, 2024		1 season, 9 episodes	Mexico	Spanish	
Licht Aus	Survival comedy competition	October 31, 2024		1 season, 6 episodes	Germany	German	
Mission Unknown: Atlantic	Docu-reality	February 28, 2025	March 29, 2025	1 season, 10 episodes	Germany	German	
Rap Generation	Music competition	March 7, 2025	March 28, 2025	1 season, 8 episodes	Poland	Polish	
The 50 Polska	Reality competition	April 4, 2025	April 18, 2025	1 season, 8 episodes	Poland	Polish	

==== Variety ====
Title	Genre	Premiere	Finale	Seasons	Prime Video exclusive region	Language	Notes
Prova Prova Sa Sa	Improvisational comedy	November 1, 2022	October 26, 2023	2 seasons, 9 episodes	Italy	Italian	
HILLarious	Sketch comedy	February 9, 2023		1 season, 8 episodes	Germany	German	
Buy It Now	Game show	October 29, 2024	December 10, 2024	1 season, 13 episodes	United States	English	
Pop Culture Jeopardy!	Quiz show	December 4, 2024	March 4, 2025	1 season, 40 episodes	Australia, Canada, Latin America, Mexico, New Zealand, Spain, United Kingdom, and United States	English	(Note: Moved to Netflix for season 2 onward.)

=== Co-productions ===
Title	Partner/Country	Genre	Premiere	Finale	Seasons	Prime Video exclusive region	Language	Notes
Hernán	Azteca 7/Mexico	Historical drama	November 21, 2019		1 season, 8 episodes	Latin America and Spain	Spanish	
El pueblo	Telecinco/Spain	Comedy	May 14, 2019	April 14, 2023	4 seasons, 32 episodes	Spain	Spanish	
Ana	Comedy Central/Latin America; Pantaya/United States (seasons 1–2); Vix/United States (season 3)	Comedy drama	April 21, 2020	July 12, 2023	3 seasons, 22 episodes	Latin America and Spain	Spanish	
Stories to Stay Awake	RTVE/Spain	Horror anthology	November 5, 2021	October 27, 2022	2 seasons, 8 episodes	Italy, Latin America, Portugal and Spain	Spanish	
The Outlaws	BBC One/United Kingdom	Crime comedy thriller	October 25, 2021	May 31, 2024	3 seasons, 17 episodes	Australia, Canada, New Zealand, Nordic countries, and United States	English	
Citas Barcelona (seasons 3–4)	TV3/Spain	Romantic drama	July 19, 2023	October 21, 2024	2 seasons, 12 episodes	Spain	Catalan; Spanish	
Dark Hearts	France Télévisions/France	Political action drama	February 3, 2023	May 9, 2025	2 season, 12 episodes	Belgium, France, Luxembourg and Switzerland	French	
Beyond Black Beauty	Family/Canada	Coming-of-age comedy drama	March 14, 2024 (Note: Canada); October 15, 2024 (Note: United Kingdom and United States)		1 season, 12 episodes	Selected territories	English	
The 1% Club	Fox/United States	Game show	May 23, 2024	September 10, 2024	1 season, 13 episodes	Canada and United States	English	(Note: Moved to Fox.)
Cat's Eyes	TF1/France	Action crime drama	March 20, 2025		1 season, 8 episodes	Japan and Latin America	French	(Note: Amazon Prime Video was no longer attached as a co-producer for season 2 onward.)
Anaon	France Télévisions/France	Fantasy thriller	April 4, 2025		1 season, 6 episodes	France	French	
Rinnan	Historical thriller	TV 2 Direkte/Norway	October 30, 2026		4 episodes	Nordics	Norwegian	

=== Continuations ===
Title	Genre	Original network	Premiere	Finale	Seasons	Prime Video exclusive region	Language	Notes
Der Lack ist ab (season 4–5)	Comedy	MyVideo (seasons 1–2); sat1.de (season 3)	December 19, 2017	December 28, 2018	2 seasons, 20 episodes	Germany	German	
Pastewka (season 8–10)	Comedy	Sat.1	January 26, 2018	February 2, 2020	3 seasons, 30 episodes	Austria and Germany	German	
Vikings (season 6B)	Historical drama	History	December 30, 2020		1 season, 10 episodes	Ireland, Japan, and United Kingdom	English	
Gary and His Demons (season 2)	Adult animated sitcom	VRV	October 6, 2022		1 season, 13 episodes	Australia, Canada and New Zealand	English	
American Rust (season 2)	Crime drama	Showtime	March 28, 2024		1 season, 10 episodes	Australia, Canada, Germany, New Zealand, United Kingdom, and United States	English	
Leverage: Redemption (season 3)	Action crime drama	Amazon Freevee	April 17, 2025	June 5, 2025	1 season, 10 episodes	Australia, Canada, New Zealand, United Kingdom, and United States	English	

== Pilots not picked up to series ==
Title	Pilot season	Genre	Premiere	Notes
Browsers	1	Comedy	April 19, 2013	
Dark Minions	1	Animation	April 19, 2013	
Onion News Empire	1	Comedy	April 19, 2013	
Positively Ozitively	1	Animation	April 19, 2013	
Sara Solves It	1	Animation	April 19, 2013	
Supanatural	1	Animation	April 19, 2013	
Teeny Tiny Dogs	1	Animation	April 19, 2013	
Those Who Can't	1	Comedy	April 19, 2013	
Zombieland	1	Comedy	April 19, 2013	
The After	2	Science fiction	February 6, 2014	
Hardboiled Eggheads	2	Animation	February 6, 2014	
The Jo B. & G. Raff Show!	2	Animation	February 6, 2014	
Maker Shack Agency	2	Teen sitcom	February 6, 2014	
The Rebels	2	Comedy	February 6, 2014	
The Cosmopolitans	3	Comedy drama	August 28, 2014	
Hysteria	3	Drama	August 28, 2014	
Really	3	Comedy	August 28, 2014	
Cocked	4	Drama	January 15, 2015	
Down Dog	4	Comedy	January 15, 2015	
Point of Honor	4	Drama	January 15, 2015	
Salem Rogers	4	Comedy	January 15, 2015	
The Adventures of Knickerbock Teetertop	5	Animation	June 26, 2015	
Bear in Underwear	5	Animation	June 26, 2015	
A History of Radness	5	Comedy	June 26, 2015	
Lily the Unicorn	5	Animation	June 26, 2015	
Casanova	5.5	Drama	August 7, 2015	
Eddie of the Realms Eternal	6	Animation	November 5, 2015	
Edge	6	Drama	November 5, 2015	
Everstar	6	Animation	November 5, 2015	
Highston	6	Comedy	November 5, 2015	
The Numberlys	6	Animation	November 5, 2015	
Yoyotoki HappyEars!	6	Animation	November 5, 2015	
The Curious Kitty & Friends	7	Animation	June 17, 2016	
The Interestings	7	Drama	June 17, 2016	
JazzDuck	7	Animation	June 17, 2016	
Morris the Cow	7	Animation	June 17, 2016	
Toasty Tales	7	Animation	June 17, 2016	
Oasis	8	Science fiction	March 17, 2017	
The Legend of Master Legend	8	Comedy	March 17, 2017	
Budding Prospects	8	Comedy	March 17, 2017	
The New V.I.P.'s	8	Animation	March 17, 2017	
A Kid Called Mayonnaise	Fall 2017 (I)	Teen sitcom	September 1, 2017	
Skyward	Fall 2017 (I)	Science fiction	September 1, 2017	
Will vs. The Future	Fall 2017 (I)	Science fiction	September 1, 2017	
Sea Oak	Fall 2017 (II)	Comedy	November 10, 2017	
Love You More	Fall 2017 (II)	Comedy	November 10, 2017	
The Climb	Fall 2017 (II)	Comedy	November 10, 2017	
