= List of television shows set in Boston =

This is a list of television shows set in Boston, Massachusetts:

== A ==
- Absentia
- Ally McBeal
- American Gothic

== B ==
- Banacek
- Being Human
- The Best Years
- Between the Lines (short-lived TV series based on 1977 movie with same title)
- Boston Blue
- Boston Common
- Boston Influential
- Boston Legal
- Boston Med
- Boston Public
- Boston's Finest
- Breaking Boston
- Bunker Hil

== C ==
- Chasing Life
- Cheers
- City on a Hill
- Costello
- Crossing Jordan
- Curious George (live-action segments)

== D ==
- Dawson's Creek (later seasons)

== F ==
- Falling Skies
- FETCH! with Ruff Ruffman
- Flipping Boston
- Frasier (2023 TV series)
- Friends and Lovers (see Paul Sand in Friends and Lovers)
- Fringe

== G ==
- Goodnight, Beantown

== I ==
- It's All Relative

== J ==
- James at 15
- John Adams (miniseries)

== L ==
- The Law and Harry McGraw
- Leverage (Seasons 2-4)
- Lucky Louie

== M ==
- The McCarthys
- A Million Little Things

== P ==
- Park Street Under
- Paul Sand in Friends and Lovers
- The Practice
- Proof

== R ==
- The Real World: Boston
- Rizzoli and Isles

== S ==
- Sabrina, the Teenage Witch
- St. Elsewhere
- Save My Life: Boston Trauma
- Sons of Liberty (miniseries)
- Southie Rules
- Spenser: For Hire
- The Suite Life of Zack & Cody
- The Summer I Turned Pretty

== T ==
- Tru Calling
- Two Guys and a Girl
- This Is Family

== U ==
- Unhitched

== W ==
- Wahlburgers (TV series)
- Wayne (TV series)

== Z ==
- ZOOM
