= Cosmic Love (TV series) =

American reality television series

- Genre: Reality
- Created by: Michael Rourke
- Starring: Ophira Edut; Tali Edut; Cree Summer; Noel Allen; Phoebe Davis; Maria Rodriguez; Connor Shennan
- Country of origin: United States
- Original language: English
- No. of seasons: 1
- No. of episodes: 10

Production
- Executive producers: Jess Castro; Viki Cacciatore; Nathan Coyle; Michael Rourke; Hashim Williams
- Cinematography: Dawn Fleischman
- Production companies: Amazon Studios; Hudsun Media

Original release
- Network: Amazon Prime Video
- Release: August 12, 2022

Cosmic Love is an American reality television series. It premiered on Amazon Prime Video on August 12, 2022.

== Summary ==
The dating show follows four single people, each representing an element of the zodiac (air, fire, water, earth), as they search for a match based solely on astrological compatibility, with couples paired based on their astrology charts. Astrologist sisters Ophira Edut and Tali Edut, aka the AstroTwins, are the show's matchmakers, who guide the singles through the Astro Chamber, a luminous orb voiced by Cree Summer.

== Contestants ==
- Connor Shennan
- Maria Rodriguez
- Noel Allen
- Phoebe Davis
- Adrianna Raphaela
- Ana Miranda
- Caleb McDonnell
- Christopher J. Essex
- Chris Ragusa
- Christopher Jones
- Danae DeSpain
- Darren Hopes
- David Christopher
- Jasmine Rodulfo
- Javier McIntosh
- Jazmin Potts
- Morgan Raphael
- Phillip Newhard
- Theresa Vongkhamchanh
- Yana Orlova

== Episodes ==
| No. | Title | Original release date |
|---|---|---|
| 1 | "Astrologically Matched" | August 12, 2022 |
| 2 | "Must Be A Full Moon" | August 12, 2022 |
| 3 | "Mercury Is Totes In Retrograde" | August 12, 2022 |
| 4 | "A Tale of Two Chris's" | August 12, 2022 |
| 5 | "Total Eclipse of the Heart" | August 12, 2022 |
| 6 | "Scorpio Season" | August 12, 2022 |
| 7 | "Proposals of Astronomical Proportions" | August 12, 2022 |
| 8 | "Charting A Future Together" | August 12, 2022 |
| 9 | "A Cosmic Guide to Meeting Your In-Laws" | August 12, 2022 |
| 10 | "Love In The Stars" | August 12, 2022 |

== Production ==
The series was announced on May 4, 2022. Michael Rourke is the show's creator and executive producer. Jess Castro is showrunner and executive producer of the series. Hashim Williams, Nathan Coyle, and Viki Cacciatore are also executive producing. The series was developed by Hudsun Media. There are also plans to have a version of the show filmed in France.

== Release ==
The official trailer was released on July 27, 2022. All 10 episodes of the series premiered on Prime Video on August 12, 2022.
