= Carles Tamayo =

Catalan investigative journalist and YouTuber (born 1995)

- Born: Carles Tamayo Rico; 17 January 1995 (age 31); El Masnou, Catalonia, Spain
- Education: Cinema and Audiovisual School of Catalonia; Escola Superior de Cinema i Audiovisuals de Catalunya
- Occupations: Investigative journalist, filmmaker, YouTuber
- Years active: 2018–present
- Known for: Investigations on sects, cults, fraud, and online scams
- Website: carlestamayo.com

Carles Tamayo (born 1995) is a Catalan investigative journalist, YouTuber, and documentary filmmaker specializing in cults, Internet scams, and social manipulation.

== Background ==
Tamayo graduated in film direction in the Escola Superior de Cinema i Audiovisuals de Catalunya (ESCAC) in 2018.

After working at Catalunya Ràdio, the Teatre Lliure, the Gran Teatre del Liceu, BBC World News, and other audiovisual media, he decided in 2019 to focus on his own independent projects, producing investigative reports that combine elements of documentary and videoblog.

== Investigations ==
=== Infiltration into the Palmarian Church sect ===
In 2019 Tamayo infiltrated the Palmarian Christian Church (Iglesia Cristiana Palmariana de los Carmelitas de la Santa Faz), located in El Palmar de Troya, Andalusia. The sect had emerged in the 1970s under the leadership of the self-proclaimed pope Gregory XVII, creating a schism from the Roman Catholic Church. During his investigation, he spent several days in the community under the supervision of a veteran acolyte named Joaquín, with whom he formed "a strange kind of empathy." Throughout his stay he witnessed methods of manipulation and mind control characteristic of sectarian groups. Once the experience ended, Tamayo recounted his infiltration on his YouTube channel, which at the time had more than 325,000 subscribers. The videos went viral, and members of the sect began to harass him online.

=== Investigation of an ayahuasca-based sect ===
In 2020, Tamayo conducted an undercover investigation into a spiritual organisation centred around the ritual use of ayahuasca, a psychoactive brew traditionally associated with Amazonian shamanism. The group, which operated under the guise of offering "therapeutic" and "transformational" retreats, promoted ceremonies and rituals involving the ingestion of the substance without proper medical safeguards or psychological supervision.

=== Infiltration of IM Mastery Academy commercial sect ===
In 2021 Tamayo carried out an investigation exposing a pyramid scheme associated with the IM Mastery Academy educational network. His reports revealed that the academy's operations combined elements of fraud and sect-like recruitment tactics. After the investigation went public, more than 450 affected individuals filed a collective lawsuit against the organization.

=== Exposure of the Trafficker Digital scheme ===
In 2021, Tamayo conducted an investigation into the online marketing and trading program promoted by Spanish entrepreneur Roberto Gamboa under names such as Trafficker Digital and the Instituto de Tráfico Online (ITO). Through a series of documentary-style videos on his YouTube channel, Tamayo questioned the program's business model, highlighting its reliance on aggressive advertising, extremely high-priced "certifications", and upselling strategies aimed at young job-seekers.

In his reports Tamayo documented alleged manipulative tactics, including promises of rapid financial success, the use of luxury imagery in promotional materials, and pressure to recruit new participants. A later video further detailed inconsistencies in the educational value of the course and the absence of verifiable trading results. Following the publication of Tamayo's investigation, Spanish media reported that Roberto Gamboa had been legally ordered to reimburse a former participant €4,840 for abusive commercial practices related to his courses.

=== MMS investigation ===
In 2020 Tamayo published an investigative report on the controversial herbalist and activist Josep Pàmies, a prominent figure in the Spanish pseudoscience sphere known for promoting unproven and dangerous treatments such as MMS (Miracle Mineral Solution), a chlorine dioxide–based substance marketed as a cure for numerous diseases, including autism and cancer.

Through hidden-camera footage and on-site interviews, Tamayo documented how Pàmies and his organization, Dulce Revolución, continued to disseminate health misinformation despite repeated warnings from medical authorities and public-health agencies in Spain.

The video exposed the sale and promotion of chlorine dioxide as an alleged "natural remedy", as well as the organization's workshops advising followers to ignore conventional medical treatment. Tamayo's investigation highlighted how these practices targeted vulnerable families, particularly in relation to false "therapies" for autistic children.

=== Investigation into Awakened Dreamers ===
In 2019 Tamayo reported on the organisation Awaken Dreamers, a Spanish enterprise marketed as a "movement of young entrepreneurs" that promised wealth, travel, and freedom. The investigation revealed how the group operated as a recruitment funnel into a U.S.-based company offering unlicensed financial-trading education, which in Spain had been labelled a "chiringuito financiero" by the regulatory authority.

=== Public talks and later work ===
In September 2021 Tamayo gave lectures on disinformation and public manipulation, participating in panels and conferences at institutions such as the University of Vic - Central University of Catalonia, the Teruel Summer University, and the CometCon convention in Gijón.

In 2024 he presented the three-part documentary miniseries Hunting a Monster, which follows the daily life of Lluís Gros, a man sentenced to more than 20 years in prison for multiple cases of child sexual abuse, who despite this was not actually doing sentence.

== See also ==
- List of people from Catalonia
