= Buy It Now =

- Genre: Reality television
- Starring: Brian Conley; Rylan Clark-Neal
- Country of origin: United Kingdom
- Original language: English
- No. of seasons: 2
- No. of episodes: 34

Production
- Running time: 43–50 minutes
- Production companies: Studio Lambert; All3Media

Original release
- Network: Channel 4
- Release: 16 April 2018 – 19 December 2019

Buy It Now was a business reality television series where people pitch their product ideas to investors and potential customers for the chance to have their products sold. It was hosted by Brian Conley.

One year after, in 2019, from November 28 to December 19 was aired four episodes of the spin-off of the show named Buy It Now For Christmas hosted by Rylan Clark-Neal where any inventors, creators and sellers of new products had just 90 seconds to pitch their item to an audience of real shoppers, all with a Christmas theme. They provide focus-group feedback, before representatives from three retailers - Amazon Launchpad, Lakeland and JML - decide whether or not to place an order.

== Series overview ==
Series	Episodes	Presenter	Premiere	Finale
1	30	Brian Conley	16 April 2018	25 May 2018
2	4	Rylan Clark-Neal	28 November 2019	19 December 2019

== Mechanics ==
In this show, inventors and sellers of new products have 90 seconds to demonstrate their item in the hope of securing an order with a national retailer.

== International versions ==
Color key

- Currently airing
- Upcoming version or season
- Unknown
- No longer airing/Cancelled

Country	Local name	Network	Presenter	Originally aired
Italy	Buy It Now – Mai più senza	Nove	Gabriele Corsi	9 September 2026 – present
United States	Buy It Now	Amazon Prime Video	J. B. Smoove	29 October – 10 December 2024
