= How to Get a Council House =

- Narrated by: Anthony Read
- Country of origin: United Kingdom
- No. of series: 4
- No. of episodes: 12

Production
- Executive producer: Ros Ponder
- Production company: Studio Lambert

Original release
- Network: Channel 4
- Release: August 1, 2013 – May 24, 2016

How to Get a Council House is a British documentary series shown on Channel 4. It is about the difficulty in gaining council housing, due to the long waiting list and not enough housing.

== Series 1 ==
=== Episode 1 ===
- Air date 1 August 2013

=== Episode 2 ===
- Air date 8 August 2013

=== Episode 3 ===
- Air date 15 August 2013

== Series 2 ==
=== Episode 1 ===
- Air date 16 April 2014

=== Episode 2 ===
- Air date 23 April 2014

=== Episode 3 ===
- Air date 30 April 2014

== Series 3 ==
=== Episode 1 ===
- Air date 8 July 2015

=== Episode 2 ===
- Air date 13 July 2015

=== Episode 3 ===
- Air date 20 July 2015

== Series 4 ==
=== Episode 1 ===
- Air date 9 May 2016

=== Episode 2 ===
- Air date 17 May 2016

=== Episode 3 ===
- Air date 24 May 2016

== Production ==
Development for the series How to Get a Council House was announced on 14 May 2013, when Channel 4 had ordered a new three-part documentary television series originally titled I Want a Council House, the new series would tackle on day-to-day realities of local authority housing teams, homeless persons' units, and families navigating the UK's social housing system with Studio Lambert serving as a producer for the series. Two months later the series had been renamed to How to Get a Council House.
