= Forever Summer: Hamptons =

American reality television series

- Genre: Reality
- Starring: Avery Solomon; Ilan Luttway; Emelye Ender; Frankie Hammer; Juliet Clarke; Hunter Hulse; Lottie Evans; Habtamu "Habs" Coulter; Shannon Sloane; Milo Munshin; Sophia Messa; Reid Rubio
- Country of origin: United States
- Original language: English
- No. of seasons: 1
- No. of episodes: 8

Production
- Executive producers: Jessica Chesler; Josh Halpert; Jesse Light; Morgan Miller; Aaron Rothman; Lynne Spillman
- Production location: The Hamptons
- Production companies: Amazon Studios; Haymaker East

Original release
- Network: Amazon Prime Video
- Release: July 15, 2022

Forever Summer: Hamptons is an American reality television series. It premiered on Amazon Prime Video on July 15, 2022.

== Summary ==
The coming-of-age docusoap follows a group of college-aged friends from different socio-economic backgrounds, who spend their summer working at a seaside restaurant in the Hamptons by day, and partying in town by night.

== Cast ==
- Avery Solomon
- Ilan Luttway
- Emelye Ender
- Frankie Hammer
- Juliet Clarke
- Hunter Hulse
- Lottie Evans
- Habtamu "Habs" Coulter
- Shannon Sloane
- Milo Munshin
- Sophia Messa
- Reid Rubio

== Production ==
On May 4, 2022, Amazon Studios announced they had greenlit the series, for a July release. The series was filmed in the East Quogue and Westhampton Beach areas of the Hamptons in New York. It is produced by Haymaker East (producers of Bravo's Southern Charm) and Amazon Studios, and executive produced by Lynne Spillman, Aaron Rothman, Josh Halpert, Jesse Light, Jessica Chesler and Morgan Miller.

The cast includes Avery Solomon, Ilan Luttway, Emelye Ender, Frankie Hammer, Juliet Clarke, Hunter Hulse, Lottie Evans, Habtamu "Habs" Coulter, Shannon Sloane, Milo Munshin, Sophia Messa, and Reid Rubio. Former congresswoman Nita Lowey, Ilan's grandmother, has a brief cameo at their family home.

== Release ==
The official trailer was released on June 27, 2022. All 8 episodes of the series premiered on Prime Video on July 15, 2022.
