= Always Jane =

- Genre: Docuseries
- Written by: Kaitlin McLaughlin
- Directed by: Jonathan C. Hyde
- Starring: Jane Noury
- Country of origin: United States
- Original language: English
- No. of seasons: 1
- No. of episodes: 4

Production
- Executive producers: James Haygood; Jonathan C. Hyde; Jane Noury; Michael Raimondi; Beth George; Shannon Lords Houghton
- Producer: Katherine LeBlond
- Production locations: Sparta, NJ; Los Angeles, CA
- Cinematography: Jonathan C. Hyde; Jane Noury; Shannon Palmer
- Editors: Rodrigo Brazão; Zachary Kashkett; Meghan Parkansky; Jessica Potter
- Production companies: Amazon Studios; Mutt Film; Union Editorial

Original release
- Network: Amazon Prime Video
- Release: November 12, 2021

Always Jane is an American docuseries directed by Jonathan C Hyde. The series follows two years in the life of Jane Noury, a transgender teenager living in rural New Jersey. Filmed in 2019 and 2020, it premiered on Amazon Prime Video on November 12, 2021.

== Summary ==
Jane Noury lives with her family in rural New Jersey as she nears her high school graduation and prepares for college. A transgender teenager who came out around the age of 15, she is pursuing a career in modeling and acting.

== Production ==
As Noury began to pursue modeling, she and her mother met Jonathan C. Hyde at a brunch for competitors in a model search event. Hyde had intended to make a film about the model search, but upon meeting Noury was inspired by her story and changed his plans.

Of the series Noury said to The Guardian, “This was never planned to happen. It was not supposed to be an Amazon show". “It is a transgender coming of age story but it’s also more about just the behind the scenes of my life and trying to figure out what I want as I get older.”

== Cast ==
- Jane Noury
- Gabriel Golam
- Laura Noury
- David Noury
- Mae Noury
- Emma Noury

== Episodes ==
No.	Title	Original release date
1	"Meet the Nourys"	12 November 2021
Jane is a senior in high school and she's ready to venture out of her small town, Sparta, New Jersey, starting with a modeling competition in Los Angeles.
2	"Far From Jersey"	12 November 2021
Jane and Laura fly across the country to participate in trans modeling agency Slay's first modeling competition.
3	"Life on Pause"	12 November 2021
As Jane's future opens up before her, the COVID-19 pandemic strikes. While quarantined together, the Noury family reflects on Jane's transition story.
4	"Farewell, Sparta"	12 November 2021
Jane's surgery is a success. As she recovers, she has second thoughts about college and what the next few years may hold.

== Release ==
The trailer was released on October 21, 2021. All four episodes of the series premiered on Prime Video on November 12, 2021.

== Reception ==
Adrian Horton of The Guardian wrote, "The series offers a compassionate and understated window into a late adolescent experience still massively underrepresented on-screen." Angie Han of The Hollywood Reporter wrote that it is "in many ways a win for representation, positioning the story of trans teen Jane and her family as a cuddly (and very overt) argument for supporting and protecting trans kids," but concluded that "the docuseries wants for depth and specificity." Indiewire published a critical review of the series, with Kristen Lopez writing, "The problem is the entire affair, too often, feels like inspiration porn. Where the joy for the audience is going to be seeing how inspiring Jane is — and little else."

== See also ==
- Jazz Jennings
