= Buy It Now (American TV series) =

- Genre: Reality television
- Starring: J. B. Smoove
- Country of origin: United States
- Original language: English
- No. of seasons: 1
- No. of episodes: 13

Production
- Running time: 43–50 minutes
- Production companies: Studio Lambert; Amazon MGM Studios

Original release
- Network: Amazon Prime Video
- Release: October 29 – December 10, 2024

Buy It Now is a business reality television series where people pitch their product ideas to investors and potential customers for the chance to have their products sold on Amazon. It is hosted by J. B. Smoove. The show is by Studio Lambert and Amazon MGM Studios, with executive production by Susan House, Jack Burgess, Tim Harcourt, and Stephen Lambert.

== Premise ==
The Wall Street Journal has described the show as "Shark Tank meets Home Shopping Network". Contestants have 90 seconds to convince a live studio audience of 100 everyday customers, as well as a panel of three esteemed judges, to take a liking with their products. If the contestant has 10 green lights or above, after announcing about the products price, and getting two approvals from the panel, their product will be sold and featured in the "Buy It Now" store on Amazon. One contestant from each episode also wins $20,000.

== Episodes ==
No.	Title	Original release date
1	"The Panel Gets Dirty"	October 29, 2024
Panel: Carmen Nestares, Jamie Siminoff, Gwyneth Paltrow "CPR Wrap" — $9.^{99}/97↑99 (YES) "Super Dirt Foods" — $5.^{49}/91↑94 (YES) "Beer Darts" — $29.^{99}/30↓18 (NO) "Beauty Moss ATL" — $24.^{99}/93 (YES)
2	"The Bug Scream"	October 29, 2024
Panel: Michelle Rothman, Jamie Siminoff, Tabitha Brown "Notx CurveBand" — $25.^{00}/22↑24 (YES) "VacDaddy" — $1,295.^{00}/8↓7 (NO) "Maskee" — $25.^{99}/42↑47 (YES) "Swap-N-Scoop" — $19.^{95}/51↑60 (YES)
3	"Turning Up the Spice"	October 29, 2024
Panel: Tanner Elton, Jamie Siminoff, Anthony Anderson "Savepod" — $59.^{99}/73↑78 (YES) "Splatz" — $18.^{99}/66↓38 (NO) "Spice King" — $9.^{99}/80↑89 (YES) "CLIP" — $499.^{00}/33↓31 (NO)
4	"Lions and Ducks and Skunks, Oh My!"	November 5, 2024
Panel: Carmen Nestares, Jamie Siminoff, Christian Siriano "Skunk Skin" — $18.^{00}/53↑79 (YES) "Looky Lou" — $24.^{00}/47↓19 (YES) "RockPro" — $59.^{99}/79↑95 (YES) "Duckeys" — $11.^{99}/27↓13 (YES) "Nanodropper" — $19.^{99}/84↓70 (YES)
5	"Tony Pops Off"	November 12, 2024
Panel: Jenny Freshwater, Jamie Siminoff, Tony Hawk "Clean Camp Dish Wipes" — $12.^{99}/54↑66 (YES) "Sunsa Wand" — $126.^{00}/78↓61 (YES) "Agua Bonita" — $2.^{49}/85↓82 (YES) "HydraLamp" — $169.^{99}/36↓18 (NO)
6	"JB Gets Stuck in the Middle Seat"	November 19, 2024
Panel: Carmen Nestares, Jamie Siminoff, Christian Siriano "Armbie" — $24.^{99}/46↓36 (YES) "Nimble Beauty" — $599.^{00}/80↓51 (YES) "Maddie's Natural Sweetener" — $24.^{00}/78↓35 (NO) "Mixxtape" — $79.^{99}/61↓51 (YES) "Forever Sponge" — $11.^{95}/76↑100 (YES)
7	"A Shocking Game of Golf"	November 26, 2024
Panel: Michelle Rothman, Jamie Siminoff, Tabitha Brown "Whiskee Straw" — $24.^{99}/46↓42 (YES) "SHOCK'D Golf Balls" — $19.^{99}/19↓15 (YES) "Sproos!" — $179.^{00}/68↓29 (YES) "FIRMAGLOW" — $149.^{00}/56↓35 (YES)
8	"The Legacy of Porkchop"	December 3, 2024
Panel: Michelle Rothman, Jamie Siminoff, Gwyneth Paltrow "LitFlask" — $99.^{00}/74↓43 (YES) "ROTO-Q 360" — $149.^{95}/20↓14 (NO) "Goblies" — $25.^{00}/22↑41 (YES) "Fluff Trough" — $53.^{50}/47↓33 (YES)
9	"The Panel Meet Dua Leafa"	December 10, 2024
Panel: Tanner Elton, Jamie Siminoff, Anthony Anderson "Mighty Cricket" — $29.^{99}/22↓20 (YES) "Painless Picasso" — $19.^{99}/76↑89 (YES) "Leaflet" — $100.^{00}/94↓42 (NO) "Liddle Speaker" — $24.^{99}/87↓83 (YES)
10	"The Panel Get Confused - And They Like It"	December 10, 2024
Panel: Jenny Freshwater, Jamie Siminoff, Gwyneth Paltrow "Leopara" — $68.^{00}/77↓43 (YES) "Confusion Snacks" — $5.^{99}/67↓56 (YES) "POP-iT" — $14.^{99}/24↑32 (NO) "AQUA Waterproof Headwear" — $48.^{00}/53↓32 (YES)
11	"The Panel Get Grilled"	December 10, 2024
Panel: Michelle Rothman, Jamie Siminoff, Gwyneth Paltrow "Shezza Socks" — $19.^{95}/56↑65 (YES) "Bola Grills" — $349.^{00}/48↓12 (NO) "Staff" — $32.^{00}/18↓12 (NO) "invisaWear" — $149.^{00}/72↓57 (YES)
12	"Jamie Gets Buff"	December 10, 2024
Panel: Jenny Freshwater, Jamie Siminoff, Tony Hawk "StackTrax" — $295.^{00}/44↓21 (YES) "Spleash" — $34.^{99}/88↑92 (YES) "Doorhickey" — $29.^{99}/51↓41 (NO) "TinyTV 2" — $59.^{95}/50↓24 (YES)
13	"The Panel Find Their Haven in the Woods"	December 10, 2024
Panel: Michelle Rothman, Jamie Siminoff, Gwyneth Paltrow "Haven Tents" — $335.^{00}/29↓13 (YES) "UnStraw" — $10.^{00}/77↑85 (YES) "Ola Bola" — $39.^{99}/17↓16 (NO) "Otter Topper" — $47.^{95}/11↓10 (NO)
