= Hunting a Monster =

Documentary miniseries by Carles Tamayo

- Also known as: Cómo cazar a un monstruo
- Genre: Documentary; True crime
- Created by: Carles Tamayo
- Written by: Carles Tamayo; Ramón Campos
- Directed by: Carles Tamayo
- Starring: Carles Tamayo; Lluís Gros
- Music by: Federico Jusid
- Country of origin: Spain
- Original languages: Spanish; Catalan
- No. of episodes: 3

Production
- Editors: Jorge García Soto; Pablo Barce
- Running time: 55 minutes per episode

Original release
- Network: Amazon Prime Video
- Release: 6 September 2024

Hunting a Monster (Cómo cazar a un monstruo, lit. 'How to Hunt a Monster') is a 2024 documentary miniseries directed by Spanish journalist and YouTuber Carles Tamayo. The series investigates the case of Lluís Gros, a cinema manager from El Masnou, Spain, who was sentenced to 24 years in prison but remained free for an extended period of time. The series was awarded a Premio Ondas and was released by Amazon Prime Video on September 6, 2024.

== Plot ==
Former cinema manager Lluís Gros Martin, already convicted of sexually abusing minors and sentenced to 24 years in prison, reaches out to well-known YouTuber Carles Tamayo, an old acquaintance of his from Tamayo's childhood years. Gros contacts Tamayo portraying himself as an innocent man, requesting a documentary to exonerate himself. Tamayo initially refuses, but later decides to follow up on him, after Gros had managed to evade prison for a few months following his sentencing. Over time, Tamayo collects testimonies from Gros's victims, exposing years of predatory behavior, manipulation, and sexual abuse concealed behind Gros's facade of respect in his community.

Tamayo spends several months investigating the case, conducting interviews, and observing Gros as he continues to live a carefree life in his hometown. The situation suddenly escalates when a warrant for Gros's arrest is issued by the Spanish police. Gros disappears, evading authorities and leaving Tamayo and the victims in a race to track him down. Eventually, through persistent efforts to reunite, Tamayo meets Gros and calls the police to have him arrested. Gros flees the scene after he is made aware that the police were on their way to arrest him, initially avoiding capture due to errors in the preparation of the arrest warrant. The documentary concludes with Gros’s arrest. He is taken into the back of a police car and subsequently transferred to prison, where he begins serving his sentence.

== Episodes ==
The miniseries consists of three episodes, all of which reference the Spanish title of some famous movies, namely A Monster Calls, Bad Education, and The Great Escape.

No.	Title	Directed by	Written by	Original release date	Production code	Running time
1	"The Monster Wants to See Me"	Carles Tamayo	Carles Tamayo and Ramón Campos	September 6, 2024	#YOMOIO1	55 minutes
Lluís Gros, sentenced to 24 years in jail for child abuse at a cinema in El Masnou, asks YouTuber Carles Tamayo to make a documentary about his case to prove his "innocence." Tamayo contacts the plaintiffs and discovers that the incidents leading to Lluís's conviction are part of a longer criminal record spanning over several years.
2	"Bad Education"	Carles Tamayo	Carles Tamayo and Ramón Campos	September 6, 2024	#YOMOIO2	53 minutes
Despite having a final sentence, Gros remains free. Tamayo continues his investigation, meeting with Lluís to understand the situation, and uncovers that Lluís is devising a plan to escape justice. When an arrest warrant is issued against Gros, he disappears.
3	"A Great Escape"	Carles Tamayo	Carles Tamayo and Ramón Campos	September 6, 2024	#YOMOIO3	55 minutes
Gros's whereabouts are unknown, suggesting he might have evaded prison. Tamayo persuades him to meet for a final scene in the documentary and devises a plan to ensure Gros is arrested.
