= The AstroTwins =

American astrologers

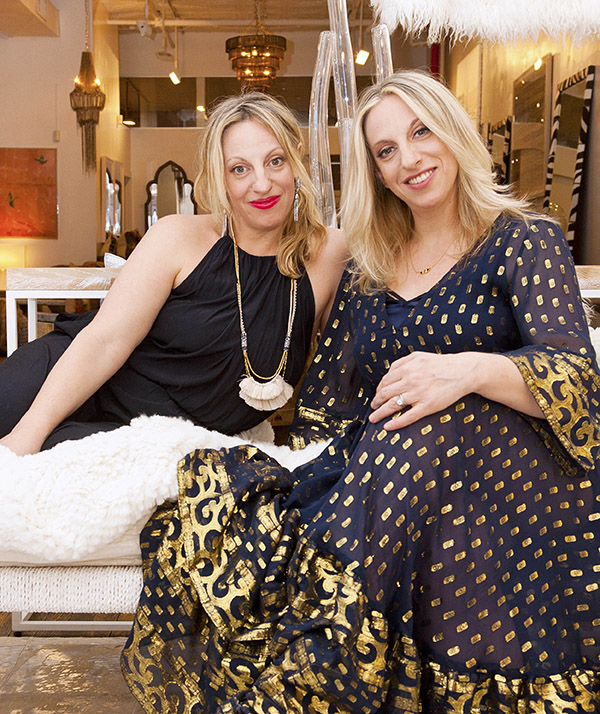
- Born: Ophira Edut and Tali Edut; 2 December 1972 (age 53); Detroit, MI
- Education: University of Michigan, Ann Arbor
- Occupations: Astrologers, writers
- Years active: 1992–present
- Website: astrostyle.com

The AstroTwins (twin sisters Tali Edut and Ophira Edut; born December 2, 1972) are American astrologers and authors. Together, they have written four books on astrology, they are the featured astrology columnists for Elle.com, Refinery29, Elle Australia and MindBodyGreen, and they publish their own website, Astrostyle.com.

== Early life and education ==
Tali Edut and Ophira Edut are identical twin sisters, born and raised in Detroit, Michigan, to an American rabbi mother and Israeli landscaper father. They attended the University of Michigan, where Tali majored in photography and Ophira in computer graphics. They interned at Sassy magazine, after Tali won a contest to art direct an issue of the magazine.

== Career ==
=== HUES magazine ===
In 1992, while at the University of Michigan, the Eduts teamed up with friend Dyann Logwood to produce HUES (Hear Us Emerging Sisters), a magazine geared toward multicultural women. HUES began as a class project for a Women's Studies course, with a print run of 1,000 copies for the first issue. Over the next three years it evolved into a full-color, glossy publication with a readership of 40,000. In 1995, HUES debuted nationally in bookstores and on newsstands, with Gloria Steinem and Rebecca Walker on the advisory board. While publishing HUES, Ophira edited the multicultural body image anthology Adios, Barbie (later renamed Body Outlaws), which was published by Seal Press in 1997. In 1997, the Eduts and Logwood sold HUES magazine to New Moon Publishing in Duluth, Minnesota. Ophira moved to Duluth in May 1998 to work on the magazine, which was published until 1999. In 1999, Ophira became an associate editor for Ms. magazine, joining Tali in New York City.

=== Astrology ===
The Edut twins are self-taught astrologers, who educated themselves on the mathematics, angles and alignments of the stars. In 1992, Ophira's then-boyfriend gave her and Tali an astrological chart as a birthday present, which sparked an interest in the field. They started reading charts for friends as a hobby, and in 2002, they were hired as the official astrologers for Teen People magazine, writing a daily and monthly astrology column until it ceased publication in 2006.

In 2006, they launched their own astrology website, Astrostyle.com, writing under the moniker The AstroTwins. Along with daily, weekly and monthly horoscopes, the site offers love, career and fashion advice as well as a section teaching interpretive astrology. By 2015, the site was receiving over 17 million page views per month. In 2013, they released an iPhone app, Astrostyle Mobile. In 2014, they launched a second site, Momstrology.com, in conjunction with their book of the same name, focusing on astrology advice for mothers.

The AstroTwins have been writing daily, weekly and monthly horoscopes and columns as the official astrologers for Elle.com since 2009; and weekly and monthly horoscopes for Refinery29 since 2013. From 2007 to 2013, they wrote weekly horoscopes on Lifetime Entertainment Services' MyLifetime.com and LifetimeMoms.com. They have also written columns and dispensed advice for People, Interview (Germany), AOL, The Sunday Times, TV Guide, New York Daily News, Redbook, InStyle, Nordstrom.com, Virgin Hotels and on SiriusXM. They have appeared on MTV's Total Request Live, CBS's Live From the Couch, Style's How Do I Look? and on season 6 of Bravo's The Real Housewives of New Jersey. Their web series, Astrologica, premiered in May 2014 on Refinery29, and ran through the end of the year. They have also done readings for celebrities including Beyoncé, Sting, LeAnn Rimes, Stevie Wonder, Avril Lavigne and Jessica Simpson.

Together they have written four books, including Love Zodiac: The Essential Guide For Women, about dating and relationships, and Momstrology: The AstroTwins' Guide to Parenting Your Little One by the Stars, a comprehensive astrological guide to caretaking, with over 500 pages of astrological parenting advice. The book guides mothers through parenting based on their zodiac sign, with a focus on understanding and embracing their child's astrological traits. It was a #1 astrology bestseller on Amazon.com.

== Personal life ==
Ophira lives in New York City. Tali lives in Seattle, Washington.

== Bibliography ==
- Body Outlaws: Rewriting the Rules of Beauty and Body Image, edited by Ophira Edut (Seal Press, 1997)
- Astrostyle: Star-Studded Advice for Love, Life, and Looking Good (Touchstone Books, 2003)
- The AstroTwins' Love Zodiac: The Essential Astrology Guide for Women (Sourcebooks Casablanca, 2008)
- Shoestrology: Discover Your Birthday Shoe (Potter Style / Random House, 2012)
- Momstrology: The AstroTwins' Guide to Parenting Your Little One by the Stars (It Books, 2014)
- The Astrology Advantage: Use Your Horoscope for Personal and Professional Success (Simon & Schuster, 2024)
