= Marília Mendonça: All the Feels =

2026 Brazilian biographical documentary series about Marília Mendonça

- Genre: Documentary
- Directed by: Susanna Lira
- Country of origin: Brazil
- Original language: Portuguese
- No. of seasons: 1
- No. of episodes: 4

Production
- Producers: Rodrigo Olaio; Roberta Oliveira; Nelson Foerster; Rodrigo Letier; Carina Schulze; Aron Berger; Priscila Portella

Original release
- Network: Prime Video
- Release: October 16, 2026 (Note: Although Prime Video lists October 15, 2026, as the series’ release date, media outlets such as Variety and Veja report that its official premiere took place on October 16, with October 15 reserved for a preview screening in Goiânia.)

Marília Mendonça: Sentimento Louco (English: Marília Mendonça: All the Feels) is a Brazilian biographical docu-series directed by Susanna Lira and produced by Chatrone and Kromaki, in co-production with Amazon MGM Studios. Consisting of four episodes, the series premiered on the Prime Video streaming service on October 16, 2026.

== Synopsis ==
How did an ordinary girl from the heart of Brazil become a phenomenon? Through previously unreleased footage, audio recordings and interviews, the series traces Marília Mendonça's meteoric rise from singing at a gas station to becoming one of Brazil's biggest artists.

== Episodes ==
No.	Title	Original release date
1	"Verses for the Brokenhearted"	October 16, 2026
Through unreleased compositions and home recordings, we follow Marília Mendonça as she pursues her dream of becoming a singer. Despite financial hardship and family tensions, songwriting gives her a way to express her feelings and break into a sertanejo industry that still underestimates women. But will this be enough to make her a star?
2	"The Weight of the Crown"	October 16, 2026
At 19, Marília Mendonça leans into songs of heartbreak and betrayal, influenced by strong Northeastern sounds for a live set recorded without an audience. Following an unexpected breakthrough performance and amid a packed touring schedule, she records her next album before a crowd of 45,000 people and becomes one of Brazil's biggest artists. But her grueling touring pace feels unsustainable.
3	"In Every Corner"	October 16, 2026
Marília Mendonça's meteoric rise comes at a cost as her relentless touring schedule takes a toll on her. After falling ill and releasing an underperforming album, she reinvents herself with the ambitious Todos os Cantos project, whose shows draw more than a million people across Brazil. However, an unexpected pregnancy could change the course of her career.
4	"Our Inheritance"	October 16, 2026
The birth of Léo marks a new chapter for Marília Mendonça. As the pandemic puts her shows on hold, she breaks internet records and launches the ambitious new project As Patroas with Maiara and Maraisa. But success and a relentless schedule of performances across the country come at a cost. When a tragic accident cuts her life short, she leaves behind an extraordinary legacy in Brazilian music.
