= This Is Family =

American reality television series

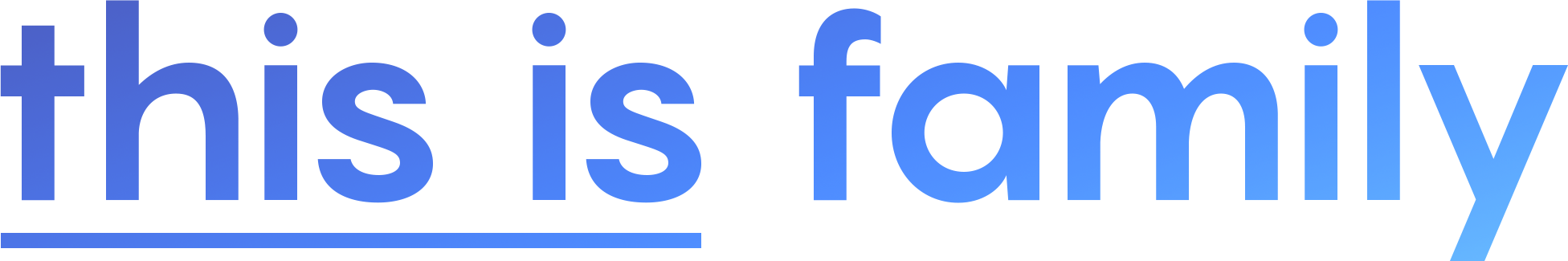
- Genre: Reality television
- Starring: Naseem Nossiff; David Azarian; Joseph Azarian; Annmarie Harb; Annmarie Richa; Sandra Richa
- Theme music composer: Nate Dodge; (seasons 1–3); Daniel John; (season 4)
- Opening theme: "Better Me" by Daniel John
- Composers: Nate Dodge; (seasons 1–4); Daniel John; (season 3); Samuel PK Smith; (seasons 3–4)
- Country of origin: United States
- Original language: English
- No. of seasons: 4
- No. of episodes: 21

Production
- Executive producers: Joseph Azarian; Naseem Nossiff; David Azarian
- Production location: Boston
- Camera setup: Multi-camera
- Running time: 22 minutes (seasons 1–2, 4); 22–42 minutes (season 3)
- Production company: Next Studios

Original release
- Network: Amazon Prime Video
- Release: September 28, 2018 – January 29, 2021

This Is Family is an American reality television series that premiered on Prime Video on September 28, 2018, and moved to Facebook Watch beginning with the fourth season in 2021. The show focuses on the personal and professional lives of the prominent Lebanese American Nossiff-Azarian family through their day-to-day life in Boston. The fourth season premiered on January 29, 2021.

== Cast ==
=== Timeline of cast members ===
Cast member	Seasons			
Cast member	1	2	3	4
Naseem Nossiff	Main	Main	Main	Main
David Azarian	Main	Main	Main	Main
Joseph Azarian	Main	Main	Main	Main
Annmarie Harb	Main	Recurring	Recurring	Recurring
Annmarie Richa	Main	Recurring	Recurring	
Sandra Richa	Main	Recurring	Recurring	Guest
Essie Powers		Guest	Recurring	
Gabrielle Hager	Recurring	Recurring	Guest	Guest
John Nossiff	Recurring	Recurring	Guest	Guest
Aaron Nossiff	Guest	Guest	Recurring	
Christopher Blake		Guest	Recurring	

== Production ==
This Is Family is produced by Boston-based production company Next Studios. The series is executive produced by cast members Joseph Azarian, Naseem Nossiff, David Azarian, and Sandra Richa, as well as Annmarie Richa as a co-executive producer. The series was greenlit on April 27, 2018, and premiered on September 28, 2018 on Prime Video. A second season premiered on March 15, 2019 on Prime Video. On April 14, 2019, cast member Joseph Azarian announced on Twitter that the show would return for a third season on September 27, 2019.

On September 7, 2019, ahead of the season three premiere, the series was renewed for a fourth season.

On September 15, 2019, Next Studios announced on Twitter that This Is Family would be a launch customer for the Sony PXW-FX9 cinema camera.

== Episodes ==
=== Season 1 (2018) ===
No. overall	No. in season	Title	Original air date
1	1	Wedding Crashers	September 28, 2018
Joseph crashes his new Beamer when he "confuses the pedals;" David's birthday is celebrated; Annmarie and Mimo shop for wedding dresses.
2	2	Custer-vention	September 28, 2018
When David's love for history goes too far, Nessie stages an intervention; Joseph attends an entrepreneurial camp; Annmarie and Mimo's illness is discussed.
3	3	Mind Your Business	September 28, 2018
Gaby and Nessie begin shooting their social justice docu-series, Aware; Joseph and Nessie clash when she goes through his phone.
4	4	Sparks	November 16, 2018
Nessie and Joseph hash out their ongoing feud; Nessie works to launch her art business, but is hurt by David's disregard for her hard work; The family is left shaken after gas fires hit their suburban town north of Boston.
5	5	Reunited	December 14, 2018
Annmarie and Mimo, along with her twin sister Sandra, travel from Lebanon to visit the family. Nessie, David, and Joseph host the annual family reunion "Mud Weekend" but struggle to prepare amidst Annmarie, Mimo, and Sandra's arrival.
6	6	Thankful	December 14, 2018
In the season finale, Mimo and Sandra pick up their wedding dress before jetting off to Dallas. With the help of the family hair stylist, Chris, Nessie straightens her hair. Thanksgiving 2018 is celebrated.

=== Season 2 (2019) ===
No. overall	No. in season	Title	Original air date
7	1	Close to Home	March 15, 2019
Furthering her work in social justice, Gaby hosts a fundraiser for underprivileged youth. Mimo and Sandra's father is hospitalized, with Mimo's wedding only a few weeks away. Joseph and Nessie are shocked to learn of the homeless crisis in Boston.
8	2	Sleigh Bells	March 15, 2019
The family's holiday festivities take a dark turn when Nessie receives a chilling message from Annmarie.
9	3	Adel	March 15, 2019
Sandra and Mimo's father, Adel, slips further into illness, leaving the family wondering if he will survive.
10	4	The Big Prank	March 15, 2019
With Nessie's phone obsession at an all-time high, Joseph sets out to teach her a lesson. The family jets off to New York City to visit Peter and Johnny. Gaby, motivated by a disturbing headline, educates herself on social justice.
11	5	A Fresh Start	June 7, 2019
With David gaining weight, Nessie enlists the help of Whole Foods Market to start him on a healthy eating challenge. Following Johnny's move and a recent job opportunity, Peter moves to New York.
12	6	Family (Reunion) Feud	June 7, 2019
Feeling disconnected from her family, Nessie plans a reunion. Nessie becomes impatient with Joseph, causing them to clash.

=== Season 3 (2019-2020) ===
No. overall	No. in season	Title	Original air date
13	1	A Royal Run-In	September 27, 2019
The family jets off to London for the trip of a lifetime. A fight over the itinerary escalates into a major feud between Joseph and Nessie. Meanwhile, Aaron and Chris have some big news to share with the family.
14	2	For Life	September 27, 2019
Nessie's worsening indecisiveness prompts Joseph to "help cure her." Meanwhile, the family attends Aaron and Chris's wedding.
15	3	Sleepless Nights	September 27, 2019
Joseph's lack of sleep begins to affect his personal life, prompting Nessie to plan a getaway to help him relax. Nessie, blindsided by the news of her friend's abuse, enlists the help of the National Resource Center for Domestic Violence to learn how to best support victims.
16	4	Divided We Fall	September 27, 2019
Joseph ventures to New York City to pick up his techie cousin, Patrick. The family is heartbroken to hear of the hateful Boston "Straight Pride Parade." Finding himself in a life-threatening situation, Aaron places a chilling 911 call.
17	5	Embers	December 13, 2019
With Mimo's wedding day looming, the Nossiff family endures a disastrous house fire.
18	6	Fight for Freedom	December 13, 2019
The Nossiff-Azarian family hosts the annual family reunion. Following the seemingly endless Lebanese protests, Nessie's friend is detained.
19	7	Unscheduled Departure	December 13, 2019
Fed up with her neighbors, Nessie makes a drastic move to banish them from her life. Sandra's Thanksgiving trip to the United States takes an unexpected turn for the worse when she falls ill.
20	8	Holiday Blues	May 4, 2020
With Joseph spending more time out of the house, Nessie and David become concerned for his safety. Nessie feels taken advantage of by her art instructor, but struggles to make a change. Christmas 2019 is celebrated.

=== Season 4 (2021) ===
This is the last season of the series available exclusively on Prime Video.

No. overall	No. in season	Title	Original air date
21	1	A New Chapter	January 29, 2021
Joseph graduates high school, but is torn as to which college to attend. COVID-19 arrives in the United States, sending the country into isolation. Meanwhile, Nessie deals with the death of her aunt.

== Soundtrack ==
This Is Family's original EDM soundtrack is produced mainly by composer Samuel PK Smith. According to the BMI repertoire, Smith has composed for television in the past: namely E!'s Keeping Up with the Kardashians. The rest of the soundtrack is produced by hip-hop producer Daniel John and electronic producer/DJ Tim Gunter. The soundtrack has notably been described in reviews as "impressive" and "superb."

Library music is sourced mainly from the boutique Los Angeles-based music library, Lab Hits; as well as InStyle Music, Spacebrother Music Library, and Beat Bosses Music Group.

The series features several artists’ music, including Swedish house composer Tobu, Kaerhart, Tyzo Bloom, Canopy Climbers, and Bird Passengers.

The main title music for the first three seasons of This Is Family was composed for the series by composer Nate Dodge, who also composed the main title for Dash Dolls and is currently the series composer for Total Divas and Total Bellas. Season four's main title music was produced by Daniel John, and is the instrumental version of his song, "Better Me."

== Reception ==
The series was met with generally positive reviews from critics. The show maintains approximately a four star rating on Prime Video.
