= Banijay Entertainment =

Multinational media conglomerate

Banijay Entertainment UK Ltd.
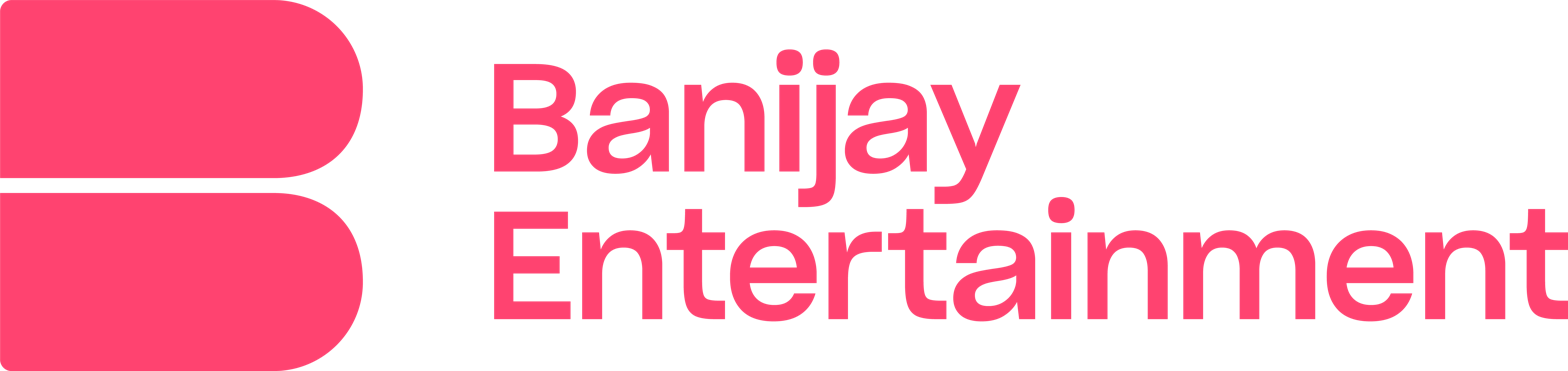
- Trade name: Banijay Entertainment
- Type: Joint venture
- Industry: Entertainment
- Predecessors: All3Media; Banijay Entertainment S.A.
- Founded: 9 July 2026; 4 months ago
- Headquarters: London, England
- Area served: Europe: United Kingdom; France; Germany; Italy; Netherlands; Belgium; Spain; Portugal; Switzerland; Poland; Austria; Sweden; Norway; Denmark; Finland; North America: United States; Mexico; Latin America: Brazil; Colombia; Asia-Pacific: Israel; Australia; New Zealand; India; Worldwide: (via Banijay Rights)
- Key people: Jeff Zucker (chairman); Marco Bassetti (CEO); Jane Turton (Deputy CEO); Thomas Goussett (Group CFO); Nicolas Chazarain (Group Chief Legal Officer); Frédéric Balmary (Chief Business Officer); Lucas Green (Chief Content Officer, Operations); James Townley (Chief Content Officer, Development); Kate Humphreys (Chief Communications Officer); Anne Van Sprang (Group Head of HR)
- Owners: RedBird IMI (50%); Banijay Group (50%)
- Divisions: Banijay America; Banijay Asia; Banijay Benelux; Banijay France; Banijay Germany; Banijay Kids & Family; Banijay Iberia; Banijay Italy; Banijay Nordics; Banijay Philippines (Note: Banijay Philippines is along with Banijay Rights Current show: Pinoy Big Brother and Kapamilya Deal or No Deal.); Banijay Latin America; Banijay Live; Banijay Rights; Banijay UK; Little Dot Studios; Studio Lambert
- Subsidiaries: See § Assets
- Website: www.banijay.com

Banijay Entertainment UK Ltd. is a British multinational television production and distribution conglomerate operated as a 50-50 joint venture between French sports betting and entertainment company Banijay Group and American-based RedBird IMI, itself a joint venture of American private equity firm RedBird Capital Partners and Emirati media investment company International Media Investments. It was formed in 2026 from the merger of the first and second incarnation of Banijay's television production and distribution arm and RedBird IMI's All3Media business.

Reports of a merger emerged in January 2026, and was later announced in March, before completing in July. The company is led by chief executive officer (CEO) Marco Bassetti, formerly CEO of the original Paris-based Banijay Entertainment; and chairman Jeff Zucker, a RedBird IMI executive who chaired All3Media following its 2024 sale. It is headquartered in London, England, where All3Media was based. At the time of the merger, the combined company operated in 25 countries, with a library spanning over 265,000 hours of content.

== History ==
On 13 January 2026, the Banijay Group confirmed reports earlier that month that it was in talks with RedBird IMI to merge their respective Banijay Entertainment and All3Media television production businesses. A merger agreement, also encompassing Banijay's live events business, was announced on 3 March 2026, with the Banijay Group and RedBird IMI confirmed to hold 50% in the combined business, which would be called Banijay Entertainment. The deal closed on 9 July, with the new company, consolidated under Banijay Group, being headquartered at All3Media's London headquarters.

== Programmes ==
Banijay Entertainment has several brands of television programmes and formats aimed at different demographics. Some of its better-known programmes and formats produced by its many subsidiaries (past and present) are:

- 1917
- 1 vs 100
- 100 Knives
- Aarya
- A Beautiful Obsession
- All Together Now
- Banged Up Abroad
- Beat Bugs
- Beat Luke Littler
- Beauty and the Geek
- Best Bakery
- Beforeigners
- Big Bounce Battle
- Big Brother
- The Big Music Quiz
- Bigg Boss
- The Biggest Loser
- Black Mirror
- The Brokenwood Mysteries
- Cash Cab
- Call the Midwife
- Coward
- Cuplables
- Capital
- The Circle
- The Cube
- The Bridge
- The Courtship
- Deadly Women
- Deal or No Deal
- Diva Futura
- Domina
- Domino Challenge
- Domino Day
- Don't Forget the Lyrics
- Drag Race France
- Drag Race France All Stars
- Drawn Together
- FCF
- Fear Factor
- Feel Good
- Fifth Gear
- Fleabag
- The Fifty
- Fort Boyard
- Four in a Bed
- Free Rein
- Fresh Meat
- The Gadget Show
- Geordie Shore
- Gogglebox
- Gold Rush
- Good Luck Guys
- Got to Dance
- Grantchester
- Great British Menu
- Hamnet
- Hands Off Chef
- History Detectives
- History Hit
- Hollyoaks
- Homes Under the Hammer
- Horrible Histories
- How to Look Good Naked
- Hunted
- Identity
- The Island with Bear Grylls
- It's a Knockout
- It's Only TV
- Jamie Vardy's Having a Party
- Joe Millionaire
- Junk Food Flip
- Keeping Up with the Kardashians
- Kitchen Impossible
- Language of Love
- The Legacy
- LEGO Masters
- Legends
- Limitless Win
- Lingo
- Lost in Oz
- Love It or List It
- Love Triangle
- Marie Antoinette
- MasterChef
- Max Headroom
- Maya
- Midsomer Murders
- Minute to Win It
- Mission Unknown
- Motown Magic
- Mr. Bean
- MTV Roadies
- MythBusters
- Ninja Warrior
- Obsessive Compulsive Cleaners
- Once Upon a Time...
- Operation Ouch!
- Paddington Green
- Party Workers
- Peep Show
- Peaky Blinders
- Pointless
- Popstars
- Quizmaster
- Race Across the World
- Ramsay's Kitchen Nightmares
- Reputation
- Rise & Fall
- SAS: Rogue Heroes
- Secret Story
- Sexy Beasts
- Shameless (British TV series)
- Shortland Street
- Simon's Cat
- Sing If You Can
- Skins (British TV series)
- Sort Your Life Out
- Sounds The Same
- Spot On!
- Star Academy
- Starstruck
- Strike!
- Survivor
- Tamasha
- Tattoo Fixers
- Temptation Island
- The Assassin
- The Beatles
- The Gold
- The Magic Faraway Tree
- The Money Drop
- The Missing
- The Only Way Is Essex
- the Rebound
- The Summitt
- The Traitors
- The White Queen
- Three Little Birds
- Trigger Point
- Toast of London
- Totally Spies!
- Trainwreck
- Treasure Hunt
- Undercover Boss
- Undressed
- The Wall
- Watch Your Step
- Wayward
- Wipeout
- Would I Lie to You?
- The Write Offs
- Your Face Sounds Familiar
- Yo Soy (Perú)

== Assets ==
Assets owned by Banijay Entertainment include:

Region/Country	Units
France	Adventure Line Productions; Authentic Prod; B-Prod; Banijay Production Media; Banijay Talent; Beau Soir Productions; DMLS TV; Endemol France; KM Production; Marathon Studio/Terence Films; Montmartre Films; Screenline Productions; Shine Fiction/Banijay Studios France
Germany	Banijay Germany Live; Brainpool Live Entertainment; Nightwash Club; Showdown TV; Banijay Productions Germany; Banijay Media Germany; Brainpool TV; Brainpool Entertainment (formerly Raab TV) (joint venture with Stefan Raab); Cape Cross Studio; Dynamic Ally Pictures (joint venture with Veronica Priefer and Johannes Kunkel); Endemol Shine Germany; Potatohead Pictures; Rainer Laux Productions (joint venture with Rainer Laux); Good Humor; Influence.Vision (also in the Austria); MadeFor; MTS Künstler Management; Only Good People; SR Management GmbH; SRM Music
Austria	Influence.Vision (also in the Germany)
Israel	Endemol Shine Israel; MoviePlus Productions
Italy	Atlantis Film; Aurora TV; Banijay Italia; L'Officina (joint venture with Fabio Fazio); Banijay Studios Italy; Endemol Shine Italy; ITV Movie; Groenlandia Group; Ascent Film; Groenlandia; Lynn
Benelux	All3Media Belgium; Banijay Belgium; Endemol Shine Nederland; IDTV; jonnydepony; NL Film & TV; Posh Productions; Scenery (formerly known as Totem Media); SimpelZodiak (formed by the merge of Simpel Media and Zodiak Nederland); Southfields; Topkapi; TwentyTwo Productions; Werktitel
Nordic countries	Banijay Finland; Metronome Productions A/S (Denmark); Rubicon TV AS (Norway); Filmlance International AB (Sweden); Jarowskij/Yellow Bird (Sweden); Mastiff TV (Denmark/Norway/Sweden); Meter (Sweden); Nordisk Banijay (Norway); Nordisk Film TV (Denmark); OnePost AB
Spain and Portugal	Banijay Iberia; Banijay Iberia Sports; Cuarzo Producciones; Diagonal TV; DLO Producciones; Endemol Portugal; Gestmusic; IMA; Pokeepsie Films; Portocabo; Shine Iberia; Tuiwok Estudios; Zeppelin Television
United Kingdom	3Rock Productions; Aurora Media Worldwide; Bentley Productions; BlackLight (formerly Touchpaper Television); Build Your Own Films; The Comedy Unit; Company Pictures; Coming Up Roses; Conker Pictures; Darlow Smithson Productions (DSP); Double Dutch; Douglas Road Productions; Dragonfly; Dragonfly North; Electric Robin; Esmerelda Productions; The Forge Entertainment; Garrison Drama (formerly Caryn Mandabach Productions); History Hit; Immovable Studios; Initial; IWC Media; Kudos; Kudos North; Kudos Knight; What's The Story Sounds; Lime Pictures; Lion Television; Lion Television Scotland; Little Dot Studios; Mam Tor Productions; Neal Street Productions; New Pictures; North One Television; Objective Media Group; Objective Entertainment; Objective Fiction; OMG North; Coming Up Roses; Tannadice Pictures; Optomen; One Potato, Two Potato; Rabbit Track Pictures; Raw TV; Remarkable Entertainment; Seamonster TV; Shine TV; Sidney Street; Simon's Cat Ltd.; Story Films; Silverback Films; Studio Lambert; Studio Lambert North; Studio Lambert Scotland; Sunburnt Penguin; Tiger Aspect Productions; Two Brothers Pictures; West Road Pictures; Wild Mercury Productions; WING; Workerbee Group; Made In Manchester; Navybee; Ty'r Ddraig; Workerbee Post; Zeppotron
United States	All3Media America; Lion Television; Little Dots Studios; Banijay Studios North America; Barnicle Brothers; Bright Spot Content; Endemol Shine North America; 51 Minds Entertainment; Truly Original; BD4 Studios; Bunim/Murray Productions; Hyphenate Media Group (joint venture with Cris Abrego and Eva Longoria); Objective Media Group; Objective Entertainment; Studio Lambert USA; Inner Drive Entertainment; MindMeld Entertainment
Latin America	A Fábrica (Brazil); A Fábrica Mexico & U.S. Hispanic; Banijay Estúdios; Banijay Latin America; Banijay Mexico & U.S. Hispanic; Endemol Shine Brasil; Endemol Shine Boomdog (Mexico/Colombia)
Australia and New Zealand	Screentime New Zealand; Remarkable Studios NZ; South Pacific Pictures; Kura Productions; Satellite; Endemol Shine Australia
Asia	Banijay Asia; CreAsia Studio; Endemol Shine India
Other countries	B&B Endemol Shine (Switzerland; joint venture with Freddy Burger Management); Endemol Shine Polska
Others	Banijay Live; Balich Wonder Studio; Banijay Live Studio; Lotchi; Banijay Kids & Family; Banijay Kids & Family Digital; Banijay Kids & Family Distribution; Zodiak Kids & Family France; Zodiak Kids & Family Productions UK; Tiger Aspect Kids and Family; Monello Productions; Ollenom Studio; Movimenti Production; Kindle Entertainment; Procidis; The Natural Studios (joint venture with Bear Grylls and Delbert Shoopman); Banijay Rights (formed by the merger of Banijay International, Zodiak Rights, Endemol Shine International, Beyond Rights and All3Media International); Horizons: Powered By Banijay; Banijay Sports; Little Dot Studios; Studio Lambert
Former/Defunct	All3Media (United Kingdom); All3Media International; Angel City Factory (United States); Angelica Films (United Kingdom); Artists Studio (United Kingdom); Assembly Film and Television (United Kingdom); Authentic Entertainment (United States); Baba Funny League (France); Betty (United Kingdom); Bandit Television (United Kingdom); Beyond Productions (Australia); Blockbuster Media (Netherlands); Bossa Studios (United Kingdom); Broadcasters (Finland) (Brand abandoned in 2016 and replaced by Banijay Finland brand); Brown Eyed Boy (United Kingdom); Bwark Productions (United Kingdom); Castaway Television Productions (United Kingdom); ChannelFlip (United Kingdom); Cut & Mustard (United Kingdom); Depeche Prod (France); DMLS Productions (France); Endemol Shine Group (Netherlands); Endemol (Netherlands); Shine Group (United Kingdom); Endemol Production (France); Endemol Shine Beyond (Germany); Fearless Minds (United Kingdom); Food Productions (France); Fortune Cookie Production (France); Friday TV (Sweden); Gétévé Productions (France); Good Times (Germany); H2O Productions (France; sold to Cyril Hanouna in 2026); Connecting Prod; H2O Divertissement; H2O Fictions; H2O Jeux; Lodition; Studio Maboul; Human Factor Television Productions (Netherlands); JES Prod (France); John Stanley Productions (United Kingdom); Kanakna (Belgium); Mag5 (Sweden); Magnolia TV S.p.A. (Italy); Dry Media (Italy); Magnolia TV España (Spain); Mastiff Media Polska; Mastiff Russia; Meter Television (Sweden); Noisy Pictures (Germany); Non Stop People (France); Neon Ink Productions (United Kingdom); Palm Plus (Netherlands); Panda Television (United Kingdom); Pineapple Entertainment (Denmark); Princess Productions (United Kingdom); Red Rooster Film & Television Entertainment (United Kingdom); RDF Television (United Kingdom); Definitely; Fizz (United Kingdom); Little Wonder (United Kingdom); RDF West (United Kingdom); Remarkable Factual (United Kingdom); Sharp Jack TV (United Kingdom); Shauna Events (French talent agency; sold to Magali Berdah in November 2022); Shinawil (Ireland, 49%; stake sold in 2015); Second Star Productions (United Kingdom); Sol (India); Stephen David Entertainment (United States); STO-CPH (Sweden); Survivor Central Productions (France); Tele Images Productions (France); Triple Brew Media (United Kingdom); Tooco (France; sold to Aurélien Lipiansky and Mikaël Moreau in 2024); Unstoppable Film & Television (United Kingdom); WeiT Media (Russia); Wonder (United Kingdom); Watchmaker Productions (United Kingdom); YAM 112003 (Italy); Yasuke Production (France); Yellow Bird (Sweden); Zig Zag Productions (United Kingdom); Zoo Productions (United States); Zodiak Media (France)
