= Sunflower TV =

Ukrainian-language children's channel

Sunflower TV logo

Sunflower TV (Ukrainian: Соняшник ТБ, romanized: Sonyashnyk TB) is a non-profit YouTube channel which streams Ukrainian-language children's programming. It was launched on 1 July 2022 in response to the Ukrainian refugee crisis.

== History ==
Millions of families were displaced in early 2022 as a result of the Russian invasion of Ukraine. According to a June 2022 UNICEF report, nearly two-thirds of Ukrainian children had been displaced. In response to the Ukrainian refugee crisis, the YouTube channel Sunflower TV was created to offer Ukrainian-language children's television series to refugees across Europe, the United Kingdom, and Ukraine. It launched on 1 July 2022, initially with British and Ukrainian content.

The project involved dozens of regional and multinational media companies including content creators, production companies, broadcasters and distributors. The project was coordinated by UK trade association Producers Alliance for Cinema and Television (PACT) and received support from the London branch of the Ukrainian Institute. The channel is managed by All3Media subsidiary Little Dot Studios, which operates dozens of YouTube channels.

PACT chief executive officer John McVay stated his hope that the channel would provide refugee children "with some kind of light relief or distraction to take their minds off the terrible experiences they've been through". Olesya Khromeychuk, director of the Ukrainian Institute London, felt that the children would benefit from programming in their native language, providing some familiarity while immersed in foreign cultures.

Programs were dubbed rather than subtitled because many of the target audience were not yet of reading age. Program makers paid the cost of dubbing. Many of the British shows had not previously been broadcast in Ukraine and were dubbed specifically for Sunflower TV. Little Dot reached out to displaced Ukrainians to provide their voices for dubbing; refugee children settled in Wales provided their voices for dubs of Boom Cymru's programming.

In December 2022, PACT announced that the channel had received over one million views. That month, the British Academy of Film and Television Arts (BAFTA) held a special screening of Sunflower TV programming for 160 families. The channel then expanded its mandate from pre-school children and sought additional programming for children aged 6–12.

== Programming ==
All programming was provided for free and presented without advertisements. According to BBC Studios, the programming was selected in consultation with child psychologists and Ukrainian mothers. Programming included popular Ukrainian shows, which had shut down production due to the invasion.

Initial programming included:

- Ben & Holly's Little Kingdom
- Brave Bunnies
- Eskimo Girl
- Engie Benjy
- JoJo and Gran Gran
- Kit and Pup
- Mr. Bean: The Animated Series

Additional programming added to the channel:

- Peppa Pig
- Go Jetters
- Thomas & Friends
- Cyw and Friends
