= Endemol Shine Italy =

Italian production subsidiary of Banijay Italia

- Formerly: La Italiana Produzioni Audiovisive (1986–1988); Aran (1988–2000); Aran Endemol (2000-2002); Endemol Italia (2002–2016)
- Type: Subsidiary
- Industry: Television production
- Founded: 1986; 40 years ago
- Founder: Marco Bassetti; Stefana Craxi
- Headquarters: Rome, Italy
- Key people: Leonardo Pasquinelli (CEO)
- Parent: Endemol (2000–2015); Endemol Shine Group (2015–2020); Banijay Italia (2020–present)
- Website: www.endemolshine.it

Endemol Shine Italy (formerly known as La Italiana Produzioni Audiovisive, Aran and Endemol Italia) is an Italian major television production subsidiary of Banijay Italia, in turn to be owned by the international media group Banijay Entertainment based in Rome. It creates and adapts adapts popular entertainment shows, reality TV, major game shows and scripted drama series for Italian television networks and streaming services.

== History ==
Endemol Shine Italy was first established in 1986, when Marco Bassetti had left Mediaset to launch his own production company with politician Stefania Craxi called La Italiana Produzioni Audiovisive in order to produce light entertainment, game shows, talk shows and commercials. Two years later in 1988, Marco Bassetti had renamed his production company to Aran, which then quickly established itself as the leading production company in Italy capable of providing the main TV networks with new programs and content such as sitcoms, soap operas, light entertainment and TV movies.

At the start of January 1998, Dutch entertainment production/distribution company Endemol Entertainment had announced it had taken a 45% majority stake in Milan & Rome-based Italian production studio Aran, marking Endemol Entertainment's first step into the Italian television production market and they had it integrated into its own production subsisidaries and Aran became a subsidiary of Endemol Entertainment, while they had renamed it Aran Endemol and Endemol Entertainment's international dostribution unit Endemol Entertainment International had assumed distribution to Aran's programming internationally. Two years later on March 31, 2000, Endemol Entertainment had taken full control of its Italian production subsidiary Aran Endemol, making it a wholly-owned subsidiary as it coincided with a massive wave of European expansion for Endemol Endemol, including their purchase of a 51% stake in another Italian production company, Palomar, right around the time Spanish multinational telecommunications company Telefónica had brought Aran Endemol's Dutch production & distribution parent Endemol Entertainment in that same year.

On October 29, 2008, Endemol Italia had appointed its head of entertainment, Marco Tombolini, to become its COO when its MD Leonardo Pasquinelli had been appointed vice president of Endemol Italia.

In November 2013, Endemol Italia had partnered with Endemol's fellow global digital video network and production studio Endemol Beyond to launch the latter's Italian production office & division within Endemol Italia.

In January 2018, Endemol Shine Italy had appointed former managing director of Banijay Group-owned Magnolia, Leonardo Pasquinelli, to become its CEO of Endemol Shine Italy and it marked his return to the companu after he depatured under its former name Endemol Italia back in 2014 when he was vice president of that time as he returned as the new CEO of Endemol Shine Italy, succeeding Paolo Bassetti who had depatured Endemol Shine Italy.
