= Banijay Entertainment S.A. =

Multinational media conglomerate

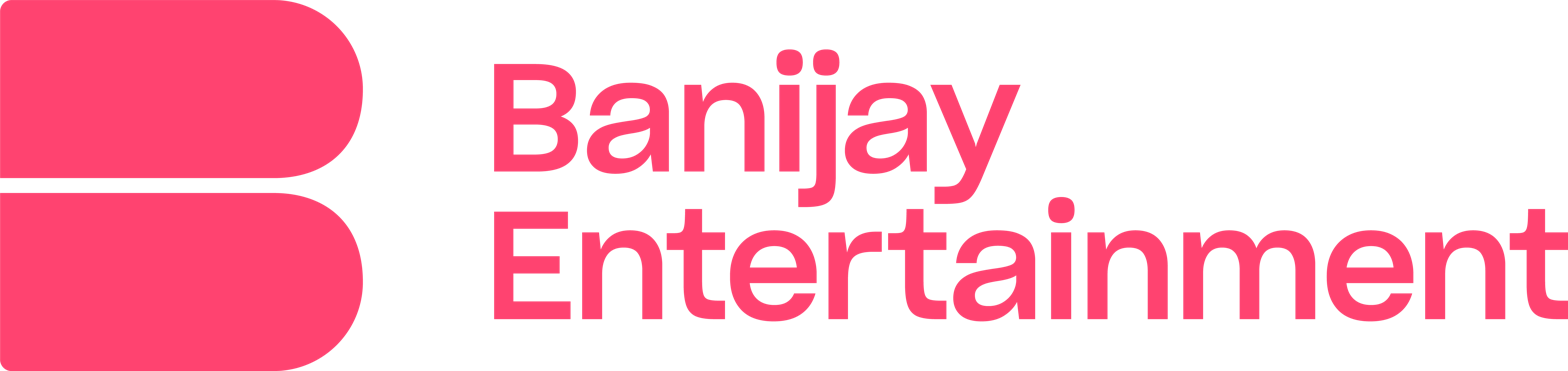
- Logo in use since 2020; also adopted on 15 May 2024 as part of the Banijay Group N.V.
- Formerly: Banijay Group (first incarnation, 2011–2020); Banijay (2020–2024)
- Type: Subsidiary
- Industry: Entertainment
- Predecessors: Zodiak Media; Endemol Shine Group; Tele Images Productions
- Founded: January 2008; 18 years ago
- Founder: Stéphane Courbit
- Defunct: 9 July 2026; 4 months ago
- Fate: Merged with All3Media
- Successor: Banijay Entertainment (second incarnation)
- Headquarters: Paris, France
- Key people: Stéphane Courbit (chairman); Marco Bassetti (CEO); Cédric Brignon (Group CFO); Nicolas Chazarain (Group Chief Legal Officer); Marie Schweitzer (Chief Strategy Officer); Frédéric Balmary (Chief Business Officer); Anne Van Sprang (Group Head of HR)
- Parent: Banijay Group (2024–2026)
- Divisions: Banijay Americas; Banijay Benelux; Banijay France; Banijay Germany; Banijay Kids & Family; Banijay Iberia; Banijay Italy; Banijay Nordics; Banijay Philippines; Banijay Rights; Banijay UK
- Subsidiaries: See § Assets
- Website: www.banijay.com

Banijay Entertainment S.A. (formerly Banijay Group and later Banijay) was a French multinational television production and distribution company. It was the world's largest international content producer and distributor, with over 130 production companies across 23 territories, and a catalogue of over 185,000 hours of original programming. Headquartered in Paris, the company was founded in January 2008 by Stéphane Courbit, former president of Endemol France, and has risen since its inception, to become a €3.2bn turnover business. It was a subsidiary of Banijay Group, a sports betting and entertainment company based in Amsterdam.

The company has expanded over the years through multiple acquisitions, including its purchases of Zodiak Media in 2016, Endemol Shine Group in 2020, and Beyond International in 2022. The group's non-scripted television formats include Big Brother, Survivor, Deal or No Deal, Temptation Island, MasterChef, Don't Forget the Lyrics!, and Hunted. In March 2026, a merger between Banijay Entertainment and RedBird IMI's All3Media business was announced, completing in July. The new company, jointly owned by Banijay Group and RedBird IMI and based at All3Media's London headquarters, continues to use the Banijay Entertainment name.

== History ==
Banijay Entertainment was formed in January 2008 through the successive acquisition of production companies, first in France, then internationally under the leadership of Stéphane Courbit (previous CEO of Endemol France) alongside Groupe Arnault, the Agnelli and De Agostini families and AMS Industries. Their first acquisition was Nagui's production company Air Productions, which was renamed Banijay Production Media ten years later on 9 April 2018.

In January 2009, Banijay Entertainment sold its Madrid-based Spanish production company El Terrat back to its founder Andreu Buenafuente. Four days later in that same month following Banijay's sale of El Terrat, Banijay Entertainment acquired 51% of Spanish production company Cuarzo Producciones on 12 January,

On 2 July 2009, Banijay announced it was expanding its operations into Germany by acquiring a 50% stake in German television producer Brainpool TV. Five days later in that same month of 2009, Banijay Entertainment announced it had expanded its growing television empire and its entry into the American television production industry by launching its American reality TV production outfit Angel City Factory with veteran producers Chris Cowen and Jean-Michel Michenaud.

In October 2009, Banijay Entertainment announced it had entered the Scandinavian television production industry by acquiring the entire Nordisk Film TV television division from multinational media group Egmont Group and its Copenhagen-based film production studio Nordisk Film, alongside its distribution division Nordisk Film TV World and its production company subsidiaries. These included entertainment company Respirator and Finnish production house Solar Television, marking Banijay Entertainment's first entry into the Scandinavian production industry. The company's executives Jacob Houlind and Peter Hannsen continued to manage the company under Banijay Entertainment.

Secondary logo, used as a main logo from 2020 to 2024.

In January 2010, Banijay announced it had bought British indie production company Zig Zag Productions, marking Banijay's entry into the British market. However, in September 2010, Banijay announced it had sold Zig Zag Productions back to its co-founders Danny Fenton and Kevin Utton, resulting in Banijay's exit from the UK market.

In March 2010, Banijay Entertainment established its international distribution division Banijay International, to distribute its own programmes as well as those of producers worldwide. Two weeks later, Banijay Entertainment acquired Los Angeles-based American reality television production company Bunim/Murray Productions for an undisclosed amount, expanding Banijay's American television production operations with co-founder of Bunim/Murray Productions. Jonathan Murray remained as chairman of the acquired company.

In April 2012, Banijay Entertainment announced it had restructured their American production arm and shut down US production company Angel City Factory. Co-founder Chris Rowen departed the subsidiary to join American multimedia production company BermanBraun and all of ACF's development negotiations were moved to Banijay's other US unit, Bunim/Murray Productions.

In September 2012, Banijay Group announced it had entered the Australian and New Zealand television market by acquiring a majority stake in Australian scripted and unscripted production company Screentime along with its New Zealand division Screentime New Zealand and a 49% stake in Irish producer Shinawil (which would be sold back in 2015) further expanding Banijay Group's international television production operations and it also marked the first time Banijay Group had entered into the Australian and New Zealand television business along with Banijay's first with Banijay Group's international division Banijay International representing Screentime's library with Screentime founders Bob Campbell and Des Monaghan continued to be CEOs of the company.

That same year, French celebrity channel Non Stop People and Cyril Hanouna's H2O Productions became new members of the Group,

In April 2013, Banijay Group announced it had hired former Endemol executive and founder of Ambra Multimedia, Marco Bassetti, to become CEO, with Banijay Group acquiring a majority stake in Italian production company Ambra Multimedia marking Banijay Group's first entry into the Italian television market and expanding its international operations into that same country.

In July 2013, Banijay Group expanded its Spanish operations, acquiring Spanish drama and entertainment production company DLO Producciones. This became Banijay Group's second Spanish production label and its first entry into the Spanish scripted genre with DLO's founder José Manuel Lorenzo.

In April 2014, Banijay Group further expanded its American operations by announcing their establishment of its American production division based in Los Angeles, California named Banijay Studios North America with Banijay Group appointing former Endemol North America executive and chairman David Goldberg served as the CEO of Banijay's American production division.

On 9 January 2015, Banijay Group acquired a controlling share in New York City-based American unscripted production outfit Stephen David Entertainment.; However, ten years later in June 2025, Banijay Entertainment announced it had sold back its share in New York City-based production studio Stephen David Entertainment to its founder Stephen David as Banijay Entertainment continued partnered with him to develop new projects.

In June 2015, Banijay Group announced it was in advanced exclusive talks to merge with rival Paris-based Swedish/French global international television production group named Zodiak Media, alongside its production division and subsidiaries that could merge Banijay Group's operation with those of the Zodiak Media company under one international television production and distribution company under the Banijay Group name. A month later in July of that same year, Banijay Group announced it had agreed to merge it operations and production labels with those of the Paris-based Swedish/French independent international television production and distribution company Zodiak Media, the deal would also bring Banijay back to the UK market and expanding into other countries and genres with the founder of Banijay, Stéphane Courbit continuing to work for the newly merged company under the Banijay Group name with former Endemol France president Marco Bassetti becoming Banijay's CEO. A year later in February 2016, Banijay Group announced it had completed its merger with Paris-based Swedish/French international television and distribution company Zodiak Media alongside its production divisions and subsidiaries with Banijay Group becoming the world's biggest leading indie television production and distribution company, with Zodiak's production divisions and companies like RDF Television, Jarowskij and Zodiak Kids became subsidiaries of Banijay Group. This marked Banijay's return to the British television market, its first entry into the Swedish television production industry and Banijay's first entry into the animation production business. Banijay's distribution arm, Banijay International was folded into Zodiak's distribution division Zodiak Rights with the latter name being retained. Vivendi also became a shareholder in 2016.

In July 2016, Banijay Group had announced that it had backed the launch of an Italian production company with former Magnolia executives Fabrizio Ievolella, Danila Battaglini, Francesco Lauber and Leopoldo Gasparotto which was named Dry ("Don't Repeat Yourself") with Banijay Group acquiring a minority stake in the new company, expanding Banijay's Italian operations in that country. The new company was placed within Banijay Group's Italian division.

On 16 January 2017, one year after Banijay and Zodiak Media had completed their merger, Banijay announced it was dropping the Zodiak name from its global international sales distribution division and renaming it as Banijay Rights.

In May 2017, Banijay Group announced it had expanded its British operations and British scripted portfolio by launching a new scripted production label with Phil Trethowan and Ben Bickerton named BlackLight Television.

In July of that same year, Banijay Group announced it had acquired the British-based television production company behind Survivor, Castaway Television Productions, along with the format from owners Charlie Parsons, Lord Waheed Alli and Bob Geldof, expanding Banijay Group's operations and placing the Survivor format under Banijay's distribution arm Banijay Rights. One week later Banijay Group announced it had launched a new British script production company with Jolyon Symonds which was named Fearless Minds.

In January 2018, Banijay Group announced it was expanding its British drama business by launching a new London-based drama label named Neon Ink Productions with former ITV Studios drama executive producers Kate Lewis and Julia Walsh. A week later in that same month, Banijay Group announced it had acquired French digital company Shauna Events in order for Banijay Group to expand it operations in the digital market.

In February 2018, Banijay Group announced it had acquired Britain-based unscripted television production company 7Wonder, marking Banijay Group's first British factual production company acquisition with 7Wonder's founders Alexandra Fraser, Liza Abbott and Simon Ellse continuing to run the company as CEO, chief creative officer and chief financial officer, with the acquired company ending its relationship with Australian television network Seven Network and Banijay's distribution division Banijay Rights taking over 7Wonder's programmes following the acquisition.

At the beginning of March 2018, Banijay Group announced it had expanded its Germany presence by launching a division based in Cologne named Banijay Productions Germany with Arno Schneppenheim founder of Endemol Shine-owned German production company Florida TV leading the new outfit.

In April 2018, Banijay Group announced it had entered a joint venture with Indian film producer Deepak Dhar to launch a new production company named Banijay Asia, to expand Banijay's Indian and Southeast Asian operations with Deepak Dhar becoming CEO and heading the new joint venture division.

In June 2018, Banijay Group announced it was expanding its Italian businesses by launching a scripted content division based in Rome named Banijay Studios Italy with former Endemol Shine Italy executive Massimo Del Frate heading the new division.

In October 2018, Banijay Group announced it had entered advanced talks to acquire rival Dutch-based global production and distribution company Endemol Shine Group, with a deal approved a year later on 26 October 2019. Two days later in that same month Banijay Group announced it had bought French drama producer Terence Films.

In June 2019, Banijay Group had announced its German division, Banijay Germany, had acquired Cologne based independent television production outfit Good Times and placed it under their German operations with Sylvia Fahrenkrog-Petersen the founder of Good Times remaining with the company as managing director.

In October 2019, Banijay Group announced it had teamed up with British adventurer Bear Grylls and production partner Delbert Shoopman to launch a new joint venture production company named The Natural Studios with Bear Grylls and Delbery Shoopan becoming co-CEOs of the new company along with the company's focus on adventure TV series and Banijay's distribution arm Banijay Rights distributing the company's shows globally.

On 8 November 2019, Banijay Group had announced it had merged two of its Italian non-scripted production companies which were DryMedia and Magnolia SPA to form a new Italian unscripted production division dedicated to non scripted content named Banijay Italia and becoming part of Banijay Group's Italian operations. DryMedia founder Fabrizio Ievolella was announced as leading the merged division as CEO alongside Danila Battiglini as chief production officer, Francesco Lauber as CCO and Leopoldo Gasparotto heading the programming of the merged company.

In December 2019, Banijay Group announced its distribution division, Banijay Rights, had acquired Italian-based and Spanish-based European production and distribution company Funwood Media to expand their Spanish and Italian operations in those two markets.

In July 2020, Banijay Group announced that the European Commission (EC) had approved Banijay's purchase of Dutch-based global production and distribution Endemol Shine Group. Two days later on 3 July, Banijay Group announced it had completed its merger with Dutch-based global production and distribution company Endemol Shine Group from The Walt Disney Company and Apollo Global Management turning Banijay Group into a global international production and distribution titan and had upscaled its operations from its then-current 16 territories to 22 with Banijay retaining the Endemol Shine name for most of its labels as it folded Endemol Shine Group into Banijay's production units. Banijay renamed Endemol Shine Nordics to Banijay Nordics and had placed its Scandinavian production subsidiaries (including Zodiak Media's former Scandinavian units like Jarowskij) under the rebranded division. Three days later on 6 July of that year following Banijay's acquisition of Dutch production & distribution company Endemol Shine Group, Banijay Group announced a rebranding, renaming the company by dropping off "Group" from it identity, simplified as "Banijay" and had launched a new identity along with its new iconic "B" logo. The next month, it signed a deal with the production company Nineteen11.

In September 2020, two months following Banijay's completion of acquiring Dutch production & distribution group Endemol Shine Group, Banijay under its German division Banijay Germany announced it had acquired a majority stake in SR Management GmbH with founder Sascha Rinne continuing to be the managing director of the acquired company. Two days later in that same month, Banijay announced it had launched a division dedicated to all areas of commercial activity named Banijay Brands, led by Owain Walbyoff.

In November 2020, Banijay under its French division Banijay France announced it had entered a joint venture with former managing director of Newen Connect, former deputy director of TV sales at EuropaCorp and former senior acquisition manager at Disney EMEA, Malika Abdellaoui, to establish a new scripted production company named Marathon Studio, to increase Banijay France's scripted portfolio, reviving the Marathon name after four years.

In January 2021, Banijay under its German division Banijay Germany announced the Endemol Shine Germany label had launched a reality production label in partnership with renowned TV producer Rainer Laux named Rainer Laux Productions.

In April 2021, Banijay under its Banijay Germany division announced the launch of a new brand and talent label dedicated to live entertainment, marketing, artist management and digital content named Banijay Live Artist Brand. Former MD of Banijay Germany subsidiary Brainpool TV's live artist and brand division, Ingrid Langheld, and Daniel Durst, the chief managing director of Bertelsmann, will be leading the new label as co-managing directors. Later in the same month, Banijay announced it had acquired Paris-based independent animation production company Monello Productions from ITV Studios-owned production company Tetra Media Studios and placed the acquired animation studio under its kids & family production subsidiary Zodiak Kids giving Banijay an animation production studio, as its distribution division Banijay Rights took over Monello's productions from its previous distribution company Kids First Distribution whose 50% stake was acquired by fellow animation studio Watch Next Media.

In May 2021, Banijay under its German division Banijay Germany announced it was expanding its portfolio with label Banijay Productions Germany entering the documentary genre by establishing a new documentary division based in Cologne named Doc.Banijay. Former ARD sports commentator of Bundesliga and the author of documentaries such as Das Leben ist ein Hauch, Marc Schlömer will lead the documentary division. Banijay Germany also partnered with Stephan Denzer in October to found fiction label Good Humor.

In July 2021, Banijay under its French division Banijay France announced it had established a French talent agency label named Banijay Talent with the former founder of French production and publishing company Non Stop Group, Hugues Dangy, leading the new label as president. A week later in that same month after Banijay France launched Banijay Talent, Banijay announced its Iberian division Banijay Iberia had launched a new creative agency label named IMA with Agus Cantero leading the new Iberian creative agency division.

Additionally in that same month, Banijay announced its Benelux division Banijay Benelux had expanded its portfolio by acquiring a majority stake in leading Amsterdam based Dutch sports producer Southfields and will combine it with its sports production label Endemol Shine Sport to strengthen the company's position in the sports genre.

In September 2021, Banijay under its American division Banijay Americas announced it had launched a new Latin American and US Hispanic production studio based in Mexico City, dedicated to premium Latin American content, named Banijay Mexico & U.S. Hispanic, with producer Marie Leguizamo leading the new production studio.

In October 2021, Banijay under its British division Banijay UK announced it had launched a new scripted production label named Double Dutch with producer Iona Vrolyk leading the new label.

In November 2021, Banijay announced it was bringing its three children's production companies Zodiak Kids & Family, Tiger Aspect Kids & Family and Monello Productions into one group by launching a new division named Banijay Kids & Family, with the three children's companies becoming part of the new division. Banijay also announced its Banijay Brands division had secured brand licensing rights to the latter division's catalogue.

On 15 December 2021, Banijay under its global distribution division Banijay Rights announced it had signed a package deal with Viaplay to access to Banijay's Nordic premium drama scripted titles.

In February 2022, Endemol Shine Boomdog announced the launch of its post-production studio. This month also saw the creation of Yasuke Production. This new production company between Endemol France and Teddy Riner will focus on the world of sport. Later this month, a partnership with award-winning French producer Alain Goldman via Pitchipoï Productions and Montmartre Films was confirmed.

In March 2022, Banijay under its Italian division Banijay Italy announced it had acquired Rome-based Italian premium scripted production company Groenlandia Group along with Groenlandia's own labels Ascent Film and Lynn, extending Banijay's Italian operations in that country with film directors, producers and founders of Grøenlandia Group Matteo Rovere and Sydney Sibilia continuing to lead the premium production company under Banijay Italy.

In April 2022, Banijay announced it is further growing its premium scripted offering via a partnership between Banijay Iberia and Pokeepsie Films.

In May 2022, it was announced Banijay will go public through an agreement with a SPAC investment group.

In July 2022, Banijay had announced it had struck a deal with American television production & distribution studio Sony Pictures Television to acquire its German television production division Sony Pictures Film und Fernseh Produktions GmbH (Sony Pictures Television Germany) from Sony Pictures Television in order for Banijay to expand their German television production operations and will go under a name change with Sony Pictures Television Germany bosses Astrid Quentell and Mirek Nitsch continuing to lead the company. Two months later in October of that same year, Banijay completed its acquisition of Sony Pictures Television's German television production division Sony Pictures Film und Fernseh Produktions GmbH (Sony Pictures Television Germany), further expanding Banijay's German television productions operations in Germany with the company being placed under its German division Banijay Germany and became a subsidiary renamed to Noisy Pictures with Astrid Quentell and Mirek Nitsch continuing leading the renamed company as CEOs under Banijay. In August 2023 one year after Banijay acquired Sony Picture Television's German production division Sony Pictures Film und Fernseh Produktions GmbH (Sony Pictures Television Germany) from the former and rebranded to Noisy Pictures, Banijay under its German division, Banijay Germany decided to shutter its production subsidiary Noisy Pictures when the subsidiary's co-CEO Astrid Quentell depatured Noisy Pictures. Its successful series like "Die Höhle der Löwen" (aka The Lion's Den, the German adaptation of Dragon's Den) were moved to Banijay Germany's subsidiary Endemol Shine Germany starting with season 14.

In October 2022, Banijay entered into a Scheme Implementation Deed (Scheme) to acquire Australian production & distribution company Beyond International. The acquisition was completed on 30 December 2022, and Beyond was delisted from the Australian Securities Exchange on 3 January 2023. Two weeks later in that same month, Banijay through its British division Banijay UK acquired Mam Tor Productions, marking Banijay's first British scripted production company acquisition and its first acquisition since the takeover of Dutch production group Endemol Shine Group alongside increasing its British production businesses.

In December 2022, Banijay under its American division Banijay Americas announced it had acquired Brazilian studio A Fábrica.

In January 2023, Banijay under its Dutch division Banijay Benelux announced it had expanded its scripted activities by acquiring a majority stake in Belgian independent scripted production company Jonnydepony, expanding Banijay's Belgium operations.

In February 2023, Banijay Iberia and the football league, LaLiga, announced they were joining forces to launch LaLiga Studios.

On 15 June 2023, Banijay announced it had signed an agreement to acquire a majority stake in Balich Wonder Studio. Building a stand-out, global media and entertainment powerhouse, the deal combined the strengths of the established world-renowned content group, with the pioneering capabilities of the live entertainment player. The following day in June of that same year, Banijay announced its French division Banijay France had launched the scripted production label named Screen Line Productions with Banijay's non-scripted label Adventure Line Productions producer and CEO Alexia Laroche-Joubert and managing director of ALP Frédéric Lussato leading the new scripted production label.

Six days later in that same month, following Banijay's parent company FL Entertainment's investment in The Independents and Banijay's acquisition of Balich Wonder Studio, Banijay's parent company FL Entertainment announced it had launched a live events division dedicated to live events offering named Banijay Events. The creation of the new division will capitalise on the company's expertise and success in content production, as well as expand its capabilities within the wider entertainment industry with former CEO of Banijay France François de Brugada leading the new division. Six days later in that same month, Banijay announced its British division Banijay UK via the Banijay UK Growth Fund had acquired an investment in London-based British drama production company Rabbit Track Pictures with film, TV and stage actor James Norton and scripted executive Kitty Kaletsky continuing to operate the company under Banijay UK.

In July 2023, Banijay announced its German division Banijay Germany had rebranded its creative marketing agency division, Banijay Live Artist Brand (BLAB), to Banijay Media Germany, with its co-managing directors Ingrid Langheld and Daniel Durst continuing to oversee the rebranded agency division along with the introduction of three pillars within the rebranded company which are House of Brands, House of Likes and House of Rights.

Leading entertainment executive and entrepreneur Cris Abrego and celebrated director, producer, and activist Eva Longoria announced on 16 October 2023 they have formed a new media holding company and premium content studio, Hyphenate Media Group. The new venture will invest in creator-led enterprises as well as develop and produce its own slate of original programming. Abrego will be the CEO of the company, and Longoria will be Chief Creative Officer. Media and entertainment powerhouse Banijay, led by Chairman Stéphane Courbit and CEO Marco Bassetti, where Abrego was Chairman of the Americas since 2020, has made a strategic investment in the new business to accelerate its growth.

During a prestigious breakfast in Cannes for MIPCOM 2023 Banijay, unveiled a brand-new global accelerator program, designed to exclusively support women creators with promising unscripted formats. Banijay Launch is geared towards discovering and incubating untapped talent, to support the next generation of global franchise makers.

Banijay UK announced on 24 October its investment in Esmerelda, the new production venture from actor, comedian and writer Sir Lenny Henry. The new scripted start-up will focus on broad appeal drama and comedy, with an emphasis on working with under-represented writers, cast and crew. BAFTA-winning executive producer, writer and director, Jon Sen, joins Sir Lenny as Joint Managing Director.

On 11 January 2024, it was announced that Beyond International's former owner Mikael Borglund had purchased back Beyond Productions from both companies, including all content produced within the ownership. Banijay retained ownership and distribution rights to Beyond's pre-2022 back catalogue, and secured a five-year first-look distribution deal for all new Beyond productions.

On 15 May 2024, Banijay announced it had renamed itself to Banijay Entertainment, as part of FL Entertainment's rebranding to Banijay Group. The group-wide rebrand now includes Banijay Entertainment and Banijay Live — encompassing its production, distribution and live events businesses. Banijay Live focuses on live experiences through Balich Wonder Studio and a minority investment in The Independents, the leading player in live experiences specialises in the production of institutional ceremonies and live events in the sports, luxury and fashion industries. Both divisions are led by CEO Marco Bassetti.

In September 2024, Banijay Entertainment purchased a majority stake in French animation studio Procidis, placing it into its Kids & Family division. That same month, Banijay Entertainment announced its American division Banijay Americas had established a premium documentary production label with former ESPN producer Daniel Silver named BD4. Eight days later in that same month, Banijay Entertainment announced its Nordic division Banijay Nordics was restructuring operations in Sweden by merging the three labels, Jarowskij, Yellow Bird and Meter Television into two labels with Jarowskij's scripted division being merged with Yellow Bird to become Jarowskij/Yellow Bird which will bring together the former's script wing with Yellow Bird's and will become the drama division, with Elin Kvist becoming CEO, whilst Meter Television was merged into Jarowskij's unscripted division effectively becoming Meter/Jarowskij.

In October 2024, Banijay Entertainment announced its Iberian division Banijay Iberia had upped their investment Spanish sports by launching Spanish sports division named Banijay Iberia Sports.

In late-January 2025, Banijay Entertainment announced its live entertainment division Banijay Live had brought multimedia live experience producer Lotchi. A month later in February 2025 following the acquisition of Lotchi, Banijay Live had launched a new unit dedicated to develop their IP portfolio into games and exhibitions named Banijay Live Studio.

In March 2025, Banijay Entertainment through its French division Banijay France announced the merger of its scripted production division Banijay Studios France with fellow scripted production subsidiary Shine Fiction to form a single scripted powerhouse under the Shine Fiction name with chairman and CEO of Shine Fiction Dominique Farrugia named chairman of the merged structure and Banijay Studios France general director Guillaume Thouret became Shine Fiction's new CCO.

On 27 April 2025, Reuters reported that Banijay is in early-stage talks for a takeover offer for British broadcaster ITV plc.

On 3 March 2026, Banijay Entertainment and All3Media announced their intent to merge, which will create a company with a total valuation of US$8 billion and estimated combined revenues of €4.4 billion in 2024. The merged company will be led by Banijay CEO Marco Bassetti, and will be equally owned by Banijay Group and RedBird IMI. The deal closed on 9 July. The new company, headquartered at All3Media's London headquarters, is consolidated under Banijay Group and retains the Banijay Entertainment name.

== Programmes ==
Banijay Entertainment has several brands of television programmes and formats aimed at different demographics. Some of its better-known programmes and formats produced by its many subsidiaries (past and present) are:

- 1 vs 100
- 5 Million Money Drop
- 100%
- Aarya
- All Together Now
- Anything Goes
- Beat Bugs
- Beauty and the Geek
- Best Bakery
- Beforeigners
- Big Bounce Battle
- Big Brother
- The Big Music Quiz
- Bigg Boss
- The Biggest Loser
- Black Mirror
- Capital
- The Bridge
- The Courtship
- Deadly Women
- Deal or No Deal
- Domina
- Domino Challenge
- Domino Day
- Don't Forget the Lyrics
- Drag Race France
- Drag Race France All Stars
- Fear Factor
- The Fifty
- Fort Boyard
- Good Luck Guys
- Got to Dance
- Grantchester
- Hands Off Chef
- How to Look Good Naked
- Hunted
- Identity
- The Island with Bear Grylls
- It's a Knockout
- It's Only TV
- Joe Millionaire
- Keeping Up with the Kardashians
- Kitchen Impossible
- Language of Love
- The Legacy
- LEGO Masters
- Limitless Win
- Lost in Oz
- Love It or List It
- Love Triangle
- Marie Antoinette
- MasterChef
- Minute to Win It
- Motown Magic
- Mr. Bean
- MTV Roadies
- MythBusters
- Ninja Warrior
- Once Upon a Time...
- Party Workers
- Peaky Blinders
- Pointless
- Popstars
- SAS: Rogue Heroes
- Secret Story
- Simon's Cat
- Sing If You Can
- Spot On!
- Sounds The Same
- Star Academy
- Starstruck
- Strike!
- Survivor
- Tamasha
- Temptation Island
- The Summitt
- Three Little Birds
- Totally Spies!
- Treasure Hunt
- Undressed
- The Wall
- Watch Your Step
- Wipeout
- Would I Lie to You?
- The Write Offs
- Your Face Sounds Familiar
- Yo Soy (Perú)

== Assets ==
Assets owned by Banijay Entertainment include:

| Region/Country | Units |
|---|---|
| France | Adventure Line Productions; ALP Music; Survivor Central Productions; Authentic Media; B-Prod; Banijay Content; Banijay Production Media; Base Records; Festival'Air; Fiction'Air; Image On Air; Vision'Air; Banijay Studios France; Banijay Talent; B Creative Studio; Daze MGMT; Lab Agency; Talent Lab; Tasty Agency; Upper Talent; Beau Soir Productions; DMLS TV; DMLS Films; DMLS Productions; Endemol France; 4-3-3 Production; BC11; Endemol France Sport; Puzzle Media; Yasuke Production; KM Production; Marathon Studio; Montmartre Films; Screen Line Productions; Shine Fiction; Société Miss France; Terence Films |
| Germany | Banijay Productions Germany; Doc Banijay; Banijay Media Germany; Brainpool TV; Brainpool Entertainment (formerly Raab TV) (joint venture with Stefan Raab); Brainpool Live Entertainment; Lucky Pics; Cape Cross Studio; Dynamic Ally Pictures (joint venture with Veronica Priefer and Johannes Kunkel); en2rage Management & Consulting GmbH; Endemol Shine Germany; Potatohead Pictures; Rainer Laux Productions (joint venture with Rainer Laux); Good Humor; MadeFor; MTS Künstler Management; Only Good People; SR Management GmbH; SRM Music |
| Israel | Endemol Shine Israel; MoviePlus Productions |
| Italy | 4Friends Film; 4Friends Music; Atlantis Film; Aurora TV; Banijay Italia; L'Officina (joint venture with Fabio Fazio); Nonpanic; Banijay Studios Italy; Endemol Shine Italy; Funwood Media; ITV Movie; Greenboo Production; Groenlandia Group; Ascent Film; Groenlandia; Lynn |
| Benelux | Banijay Belgium; Endemol Shine Nederland; Endemol Shine Scripted; jonnydepony; NL Film & TV; Posh Productions; Scenery (formerly known as Totem Media); SimpelZodiak (formed by the merge of Simpel Media and Zodiak Nederland); Southfields; Topkapi; TVBV |
| Nordic countries | Banijay Factory; Banijay Finland; Metronome Productions A/S (Denmark); Endemol Shine Finland; Rubicon TV AS (Norway); Filmlance International AB (Sweden); Jarowskij (Sweden); Jarowskij Finland; Jarowskij/Yellow Bird (Sweden); Mastiff TV (Denmark/Norway/Sweden); Meter/Jarowskij (Sweden); Nordisk Banijay (Norway); Nordisk Film TV (Denmark); OnePost AB; Respirator (Denmark); Banijay Nordic Mobile |
| Spain and Portugal | Banijay Iberia; Banijay Iberia Sports; Cuarzo Producciones; Dlo Producciones; Endemol Portugal; IMA; Shine Iberia; Magnolia; Diagonal Television; Gestmusic; LALIGA Studios; Zeppelin Television; Tuiwok Estudios; Pokeepsie Films |
| United Kingdom | BlackLight (formerly Touchpaper Television); Caryn Mandabach Productions; The Comedy Unit; Conker Pictures; Darlow Smithson Productions (DSP); Double Dutch; Douglas Road Productions; Dragonfly; Dragonfly North; Electric Robin; Esmerelda Productions; The Forge Entertainment; Immovable Studios; Initial; IWC Media; Kudos; Kudos North; What's The Story Sounds; Mam Tor Productions; OP Media; Rabbit Track Pictures; Remarkable Entertainment; Shine TV; Shiny Button Productions; Sidney Street; Simon's Cat Ltd.; Tiger Aspect Productions; Wild Mercury Productions; Workerbee Group; Made In Manchester; Navybee; Ty'r Ddraig; Workerbee Post; Zeppotron |
| United States | Banijay Studios North America; Endemol Shine North America; 51 Minds Entertainment; Truly Original; BD4; Beyond Media Rights; Beyond Productions; Bunim/Murray Productions; Hyphenate Media Group (joint venture with Cris Abrego and Eva Longoria) |
| Latin America | A Fábrica (Brazil); A Fábrica Mexico & U.S. Hispanic; Banijay Estúdios; Banijay Mexico & U.S. Hispanic; Endemol Shine Boomdog (Mexico/Colombia) |
| Australia and New Zealand | Beyond International; Beyond Action; Beyond Entertainment; Beyond West; Beyond TNC (joint venture with TNC Media); Screentime; Screentime New Zealand; Remarkable Studios NZ; Endemol Shine Australia |
| Asia | Banijay Asia; CreAsia Studio; Endemol Shine India |
| Other countries | B&B Endemol Shine (Switzerland; joint venture with Freddy Burger Management); Endemol Shine Polska |
| International | Banijay Brands; Banijay Branded Entertainment; Banijay Live; Banijay Live Studio; Balich Wonder Studio; Banijay Kids & Family; Banijay Kids & Family Digital; Banijay Kids & Family Distribution; Zodiak Kids & Family France; Zodiak Kids & Family Productions UK; Tiger Aspect Kids and Family; Monello Productions; Ollenom Studio; Movimenti Production; Kindle Entertainment; Procidis; The Natural Studios (joint venture with Bear Grylls and Delbert Shoopman); Banijay Rights (formed by the merger of Banijay International, Zodiak Rights, Endemol Shine International and Beyond Rights); Horizons: Powered By Banijay; Banijay Sports |
| Former/Defunct | Angel City Factory (United States); Artists Studio (United Kingdom); Authentic Entertainment (United States); Baba Funny League (France); Bandit Television (United Kingdom); Beyond Productions (Australia); Blockbuster Media (Netherlands); Broadcasters (Finland) (Brand abandoned in 2016 and replaced by Banijay Finland brand); Bwark Productions (United Kingdom); Castaway Television Productions (United Kingdom); Cut & Mustard (United Kingdom); Depeche Prod (France); Endemol Shine Group (Netherlands); Endemol (Netherlands); Shine Group (United Kingdom); Endemol Production (France); Endemol Shine Beyond (Germany); Fearless Minds (United Kingdom); Food Productions (France); Fortune Cookie Production (France); Gétévé Productions (France); Good Times (Germany); H2O Productions (France; sold to Cyril Hanouna in 2026); Connecting Prod; H2O Divertissement; H2O Fictions; H2O Jeux; Lodition; Studio Maboul; Human Factor Television Productions (Netherlands); JES Prod (France); Kanakna (Belgium); Mag5 (Sweden); Magnolia TV S.p.A. (Italy); Dry Media (Italy); Magnolia TV España (Spain); Mastiff Media Polska; Mastiff Russia; Meter Television (Sweden); Noisy Pictures (Germany); Non Stop People (France); Neon Ink Productions (United Kingdom); Palm Plus (Netherlands); Pineapple Entertainment (Denmark); RDF Television (United Kingdom); Definitely; Fizz (United Kingdom); Little Wonder (United Kingdom); RDF West (United Kingdom); Remarkable Factual (United Kingdom); Sharp Jack TV (United Kingdom); Shauna Events (French talent agency; sold to Magali Berdah in November 2022); Shinawil (Ireland, 49%; stake sold in 2015); Sol (India); Stephen David Entertainment (United States); STO-CPH (Sweden); Tele Images Productions (France); Tooco (France; sold to Aurélien Lipiansky and Mikaël Moreau in 2024); WeiT Media (Russia); Wonder (United Kingdom); YAM 112003 (Italy); Yellow Bird (Sweden); Zig Zag Productions (United Kingdom); Zodiak Media (France) |
