= Struum =

Defunct over-the-top streaming video service

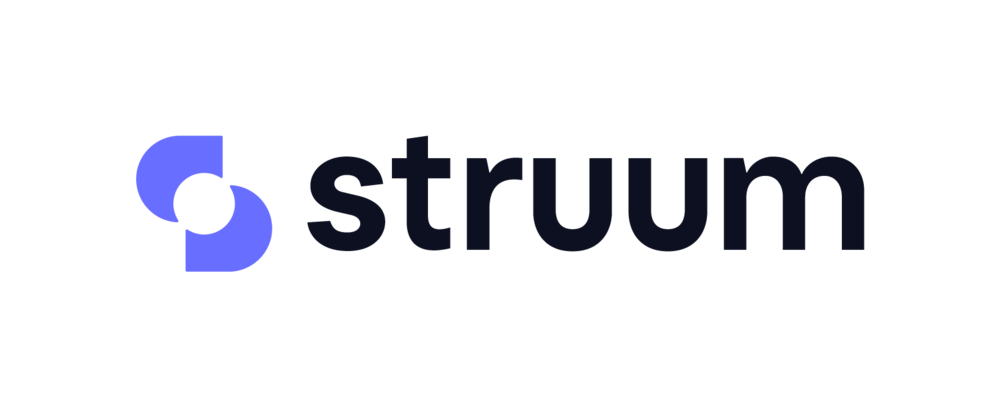
- Website type: OTT video streaming platform
- Founded: April 2020
- Dissolved: February 2023
- Headquarters: Sherman Oaks, California
- Area served: United States
- Key people: Lauren DeVillier, Paul Pastor, Eugene Liew, Thomas Wadsworth, Michael Eisner, Nancy Tellem
- Registration: Required
- Current status: Defunct

Struum (stylized as struum) was an online streaming platform headquartered in Los Angeles, California. The service focused on leveraging a credit-based subscription model that combines the content libraries from over 25 different streaming services.

Based on the ClassPass model, which allowed subscribers to use the facilities of any member health club, the service acted as an aggregator for various small specialty video-on-demand streaming applications, allowing subscribers to use monthly credits to view content from any of the participating services rather than having to individually subscribe to each app.

Its preview product was first launched in the United States on May 25, 2021, on various devices, including iOS mobile/tablet, web browsers, and Chromecast. The service would quietly shutter operations in February 2023 after running out of cash for its operations.

== History ==
Struum was founded in April 2020 by former Disney & Discovery executives Lauren DeVillier, Eugene Liew, Paul Pastor, and Thomas Wadsworth.

After its founding, the platform was built with support of Firstlight Media with an array of cloud-native technologies that allow it to aggregate content from more than 50 providers. Its board grew to include Michael Eisner, former CEO of Disney, and Nancy Tellem, former president of CBS.

The preview product officially launched in May 2021 in the United States via the iOS app store at a subscription price of $4.99 per month for 50 credits. The service was slated to expand into Canada in 2022, in partnership with Corus Entertainment.

Struum would shutter its operations in February 2023 after failing to secure funding for its partners, running out of cash for its company operations, and failing to maintain service operations.

== Content ==
Struum hosted up to 50 content providers for the streaming service:

- Tastemade
- Tribeca
- Cheddar News
- Kocowa
- Dekkoo
- Magellan TV
- History Hit
- Gusto
- Young Hollywood
- Indieflix
- Filmbox
- Echoboom Sports
- Social Club TV
- Cinedigm
- Magnolia Pictures
- Little Dot Studios
- Group 9
- Stingray Music
- Filmhub
- BBC Select
- REVOLT
- France Channels
- InsightTV
- Docubay
- FuelTV
- The Great Courses Signature Collection
- Shout! Factory
- OUTtv
- SVTV
- CGOOD TV
- Alchimie
