= 2000 Murcia katana murder =

Triple homicide in Murcia, Spain

- Arrest of José Rabadán on 3 April 2000.
- Native name: El crimen de la catana
- Location: Murcia, Spain
- Date: 1 April 2000
- Attack type: Mass murder; Mass stabbing; Familicide
- Weapons: Katana; Machete
- Deaths: 3
- Perpetrator: José Rabadán Pardo

On 1 April 2000, 16-year-old José Rabadán Pardo killed his parents and sister in the Santiago el Mayor neighborhood of Murcia, Spain, using a katana and machete. The murders, known as the Katana crime, was the first serious crime case to be tried under the new juvenile law, which had been passed a few months earlier.

Rabádan was sentenced to eight years at a juvenile detention facility and released accordingly on supervised release in 2008.

== Incident and arrest ==
José Rabadán Pardo was a fan of martial arts and bladed weapons. Originally from Murcia, the young man's behavior was described as "reserved" and "polite." A year before committing the murder, Rabadán attempted to run away from home and dropped out of school. He had maintained a regular online chat with a 14-year-old girl from Terrassa, and a few hours before the murders, Rabadán wrote to her about his plans to kill his family.

At 6:30 a.m. on 1 April 2000, Rabadán went to the bedroom of his father, 51-year-old Rafael Rabadán Tovar, and inflicted over 30 fatal slash wounds with a 71 cm long katana as Rafael slept. His mother, Mercedes Pardo Peréz, overheard the murder and was also attacked as she entered the room, being cut around 35 times before dying. Rabadán then sought out his sister, 9-year-old María Mercedes Rabadán Pardo, who had Down syndrome, inside her room. He severely wounded María before the katana broke and ultimately used a machete to kill her. Some of the victims had several of their fingers cut off as they attempted to shield themselves from the attack with their hands. Afterwards Rabadán placed bags over the heads of the corpses and moved María's body into a bathtub in the bathroom, returning to his mother's body to stab her again to ensure her death before taking his mobile phone and 15,000 pesetas, leaving the house around seven in the morning. At 9:00 a.m., Rabadán called police and informed them of three deaths at his address. He later called other emergency services, identifying himself and confessing to the murders.

Rabadán was arrested by the National Police Corps two days later at the Alicante train station, having been tipped off by the 14-year-old girl from Terassa, who had been called by Rabadán and informed of his location after he voiced a desire to visit her. She had already notified police after receiving Rabadán's messages. In custody, Rabadán told police that he only planned to kill his mother and father, but killed his sister so she "wouldn't suffer" by not having her parents. He stated that he had developed an admiration for the video game character Squall Leonhart, the protagonist of the 1999 video game Final Fantasy VIII, which he described as his favorite game, and an obsession with Satanism after partially reading two books on the subject. The katana had been gifted to Rabadán by his parents and a search of his room found additional weapons including a second machete, brass knuckles, nunchaku, numerous shivs, and other blades. Media subsequently nicknamed Rabadán "The Katana Killer" (Spanish: El asesino de la katana).

== Trial and imprisonment ==
Regarding his mental state, Dr. García Andrade stated that Rabadán suffered from "idiopathic epilepsy," which, according to him, would have caused Rabadán to lose control of his actions during the homicide. For his part, Dr. Barcia Selorio also confirms that, despite suffering from epilepsy, she was the victim of a mixture of confusion and outburst motivated by absurd and fantastical beliefs that "triggered behavior disconnected from her personality." While Rabadán's fixation on violent video games was acknowledged, it was determined that there was no indication that the games affected his mental state.

Rabadán was sentenced to eight years in a juvenile detention center, plus an additional two years of supervised release. At the time of the crime, Rabadán was 16 years old, so the adult regime applied due to the regulations in force at that time, prior to the enactment of the new Juvenile Justice Act. For this reason, prior to being transferred to the specialized educational center "La Zarza" Juvenile Center, Rabadán served nine months in an adult prison.

In an initial ruling, it was established that his confinement would end in August 2006, thus beginning the period of supervised release until August 2008. However, through a court order dated 22 December 2005, the juvenile court judge, with the help of the prosecution and the court's technical team, modified the measure and decided to reduce his stay at the center by the last eight months less six days, bringing forward the start of his supervised release to 1 January 2006. This decision was based on the fact that Rabadán had already served three-quarters of his sentence at the center and that extending the measure could negatively affect his personal situation.

Organic Law 5/2000, of 12 January focused on the criminal responsibility of minors, was accepted on 13 January 2001. In the case of José Rabadán, this law was taken into account throughout the execution of his sentence, making him one of the first beneficiaries of this new law.

After his release, Rabadán lived at a rehabilitation centre in Cantabria, where he met and eventually married a priest's daughter. As of 2017, Rabadán lives in Santander with his wife and daughter, working as a stockbroker. He voiced regret for the murders, attributing his rehabilitation to his conversion to Evangelicalism. In November of the same year, a documentary titled Yo fui un asesino (I was a murderer) was published by DMAX and Cuarzo, featuring Rabadán in his first public appearance since his release. Rabadán described how he had a fascination with "dark themes" and a desire to shed his identity by committing an "evil act", also stating that his "body moved by itself" while committing the murders.
