= Banijay UK Productions =

TV production company

Banijay UK Productions Limited
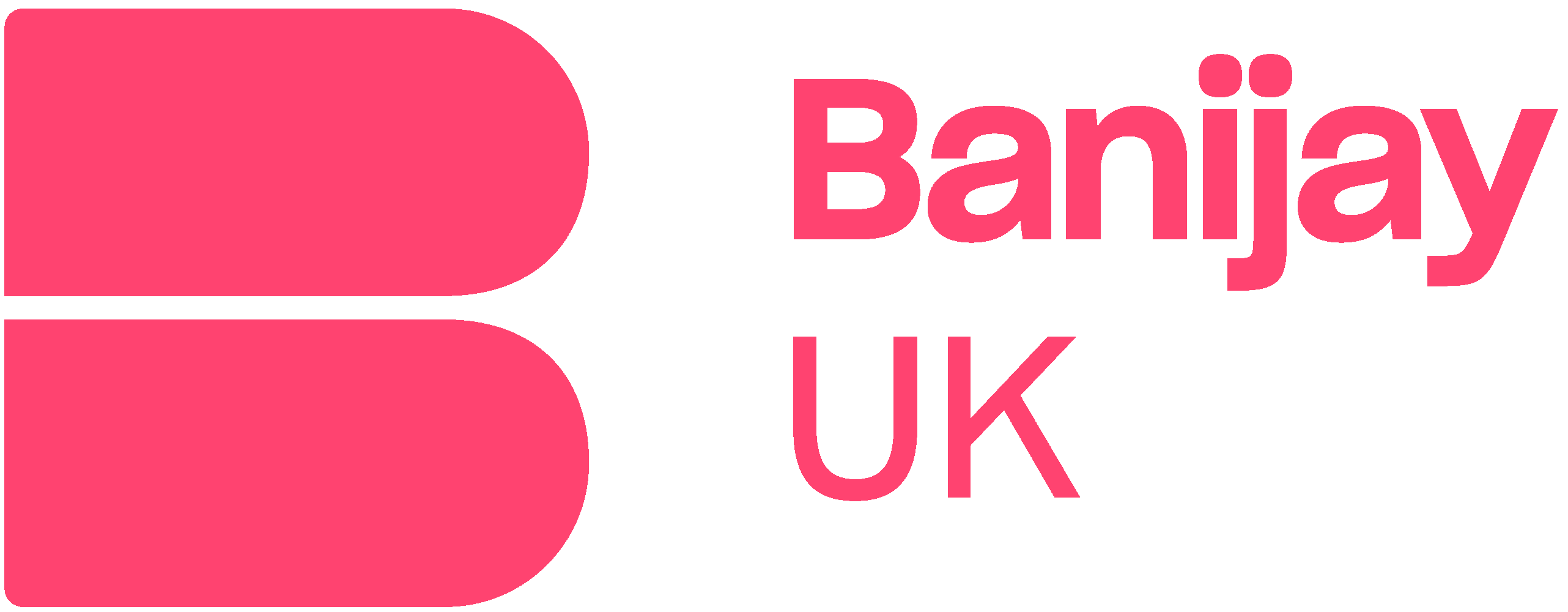
- Logo used since 2023
- Trade name: Banijay UK
- Formerly: Edenspring Limited (Jan–Mar 1983); Edenspring Investments Public Limited Company (1983–1987); Broadcast Communications PLC (1987–1998); GMG Endemol Entertainment PLC (1998–2000); Endemol Entertainment UK PLC (2000–2002); Endemol UK PLC (2002–2011); Endemol UK Limited (2011–2018); Endemol Shine UK Limited (2018–2023)
- Type: Subsidiary
- Industry: Television production
- Founded: 19 January 1983; 43 years ago
- Founders: Joop van den Ende; John de Mol
- Headquarters: Shepherd's Bush, London, England
- Area served: United Kingdom
- Key people: Patrick Holland (executive chair and CEO); Sarb Nijjer (chief operating officer)
- Number of employees: 800
- Parent: Guardian Media Group (1990–1998, 100%; 1998–2000, 50%); Endemol (1998–2000, 50%; 2000–2015, 100%); Endemol Shine Group (2015–2020); Banijay Entertainment (2020–2026; 2026–present)
- Divisions: BlackLight; Company Pictures; Conker; The Comedy Unit; Double Dutch; Douglas Road Productions; Dragonfly; Darlow Smithson Productions; Electric Robin; Esmeralda Productions; The Forge Entertainment; Garrison Drama Limited; Immovable Studios; Initial; IWC Media; Kudos; Lime Pictures; Lion Television; Little Dot Studios; Mam Tor Productions; Maverick Television; Neal Street Productions; New Pictures; North One Television; Objective Media Group; Optomen; Rabbit Track Pictures; Raw; Remarkable Entertainment; Shine TV; Sidney Street; Silverback Films; Simon's Cat; Studio Lambert; Tiger Aspect Productions; Two Brothers Pictures; What's The Story Bounds; Wild Mercury; Workerbee Group; Zeppotron
- Website: banijayuk.com

Banijay UK Productions Limited, trading as Banijay UK, is a British television production company. Since 2020, the company has been a subsidiary of Banijay Entertainment. Banijay UK is most known for producing TV series Big Brother, Celebrity Big Brother and MasterChef.

Banijay UK incorporates a number of production brands, including Artists Studio, Darlow Smithson Productions, House of Tomorrow, Initial, Remarkable Entertainment (previously Brighter Pictures and Cheetah Television), Tiger Aspect, Tigress Productions, Zeppotron, and their digital divisions: Endemol Games and Endemol Digital Studio.

After entering a joint venture with 21st Century Fox, additional companies under the new Endemol Shine UK umbrella include Dragonfly, Kudos, and Princess Productions (now defunct). The various television production brands specialise in a broad range of genres including entertainment, reality series, drama series, specialist factual, arts, live events, music entertainment, documentaries, youth shows and comedy.

== History ==
=== 20th century ===
The UK branch of Endemol originated from Peter Bazalgette's sale of his television company Bazal to the Guardian Media Group (GMG) in 1990. In September 1998, Dutch entertainment production & distribution company Endemol Entertainment (now Endemol) acquired a 50% stake in GMG's British production subsidiary Broadcast Communications alongside Bazal Productions, marking Endemol Entertainment's entry into the UK production business as Broadcast Communications became Endemol's newly UK division and had it renamed to GMG Endemol Entertainment with Bazal founder Peter Bazalgette became creative director of the renamed unit. Endemol would later bought the company outright from GMG in August 2000.

=== 2000–2004 ===
In April 2000, GMG Endemol Entertainment announced that they had acquired a 50% majority stake in interactive TV digital company Victoria Real.

Since 2000, a series of corporate owners and public stock transactions has culminated in the joint venture of 2014 with 21st Century Fox's Shine Group to form the rebranded Endemol Shine UK, effective January 2015.

In April 2001, Endemol UK announced that they've acquired London-based television production company Brighter Pictures a production unit that was founded back in 1992 by producers Gavin Hay and Remy Blumenfeld, the studio had offices based in both Scotland and India. The acquisition of London-based television production company Brighter Pictures had marked Endemol UK's first expansion as Brighter Pictures became a subsidiary of Endemol UK with Brighter co-founders Gavin Hay and Remy Blumenfeld continued leading the subsidiary.

=== 2005–2009 ===
In November 2009, Endemol UK announced that they were expanding their British television production operations by acquiring three British comedy production companies. These included Tiger Aspect Productions and their animation division, Tigress Productions, giving parent company Endemol an entry into animation production. Also included was the acquisition of London and Brighton-based documentary/drama production company Darlow Smithson Productions from American-based global sports and fashion media company IMG under their media division IMG Entertainment.

=== 2010–2014 ===
On 28 July 2014, Endemol UK and their European-based television production and distribution company Endemol announced that they had launched a new production label with Charlie Brooker named House of Tomorrow.

In May 2014, Endemol UK and their parent company Endemol along with its owner Apollo Global Management announced that they're intending to merge Endemol UK's Dutch-based global entertainment production, distribution and parent company Endemol with 21st Century Fox's British-based global production and distribution company Shine Group and Apollo's CORE Media Group to create one global production and distribution company under one group with Endemol's own UK companies will combine with Shine Group's UK production labels. Five months later in October of that same year, Endemol UK's parent company Endemol alongside its owner Apollo announced that they've finalized an agreement with 21st Century Fox to merge Endemol UK's Dutch-based global entertainment production, distribution and parent company Endemol with British entertainment production and distribution company Shine Group to create a global production and distribution company with Endemol UK being part of the merged company.

=== 2015–2019 ===
In March 2015 after the completion of the merger between Endemol and Shine Group to form Endemol Shine Group, Endemol Shine UK and their parent company Endemol Shine Group announced that they launched its first scripted production label after the merger named Bandit Television.

In August 2015, Endemol Shine UK had announced that they had brought a controlling stake in London-based animation production outfit Simon's Cat Ltd with the animation company being fully interrogated into their Endemol Beyond division.

On 4 December 2015, Endemol Shine UK announced that they launched a new production company unit dedicated to food, factual and lifestyle formats with creative director of Masterchef UK Karen Ross named Sidney Street.

In January 2016, Endemol Shine UK announced that they had acquired the short-form and branded content production house Electric Robin and the digital talent management firm OP Talent.

In May 2017, Endemol Shine UK and their parent company Endemol Shine Group had announced that they're shutting down their production label Princess Productions at the end of 2017 after 20 years with its shows such as Sunday Brunch will move to other Endemol Shine labels.

In July 2017, Endemol Shine UK announced that they had struck a deal with Sharp Jack Media founders and former ITV Studios creative executives Elliot Johnson and Amanda Wilson by launching a new London-based entertainment and factual production company named Sharp Jack TV and placing it as their label with their founders becoming joint MDs along with Sharp Jack Media's existing IP and developments becoming part of the group.

=== 2020–2024 ===
On 30 June 2020, the European Commission approved Banijay's purchase of Endemol Shine UK's parent company Endemol Shine Group. A month later in July of that year, French production & distribution company Banijay Group (who owns its British subsidiaries) completed its merger with Endemol Shine UK's Dutch-based global production and distribution parent Endemol Shine Group from The Walt Disney Company and Apollo Global Management turning Banijay Group into a global international production and distribution titan as Endemol Shine UK became Banijay's new British production division with Banijay placing all of its British subsidiaries such as RDF Television and IWC Media (the two were former Zodiak Media subsidiaries) into the acquired Endemol.Shine UK division and had it renamed to Banijay UK although it retained the former name until 2023.

In late-October 2021, Banijay UK announced the launch of its scripted production label called Double Dutch with Banijay-owned Tiger Aspect development executive & drama producer Iona Vrolyk leading Banijay UK's new scripted production unit as its president of the new subsidiary alongside writer Julie Gearey who became a collaborator within Double Dutch as the new label launching its focus on delivering high-end, character-led original series.

On 1 January 2024, Banijay UK announced that RDF Television, RDF West and Fizz would be absorbed into the company, with RDF shows such as Only Connect and Tipping Point being made by Remarkable Entertainment instead.

On 6 June 2024, Banijay UK acquired Caryn Mandabach Productions (CMP) and renamed it Garrison Drama Limited. Caryn Mandabach, who had produced shows in the United Kingdom under the Caryn Mandabach Productions banner, will now produce shows under the Conduit Productions banner, with a first-look deal with Banijay.

== Subsidiaries ==
=== Darlow Smithson Productions ===
Darlow Smithson Productions also known as DSP is a British documentary and drama production subsidiary of Banijay UK that is based in London and Brighton. It was founded in 1988 by documentary producers and directors David Darlow and John Smithson.

In June 2002, Darlow Smithson Productions (DSP)'s co-founder John Smithson acquired full control of the company from its co-founder David Darlow.

In April 2006, American sports and media company IMG through its independent sports producer Trans World International (TWI) (now IMG Studios) announced that it would acquire Darlow Smithson Productions (DSP) in a move that would bring TWI into factual programming.

In November 2009, Darlow Smithson Productions (DSP) alongside British comedy production company Tiger Aspect Productions and its documentary division Tigress Productions were sold by its former American media and sports parent company IMG to Dutch entertainment production group Endemol through its UK division Endemol UK, Darlow.

==== Filmography ====
Title	Years	Network	Notes
Seconds from Disaster	2004–2018	National Geographic	
I Shouldn't Be Alive	2005–2013	Channel 4 Discovery Channel/Animal Planet (United States)	
Ancient Megastructures	2007	National Geographic Channel; History Television (Canada)	co-production with Parallax Film Productions
Richard Hammond's Engineering Connections	2008–2011	BBC Two; National Geographic Channel	
The Diary of Anne Frank	2009	BBC One	
Into the Universe with Stephen Hawking	2010	Discovery Channel UK; Discovery Channel (United States)	
Curiosity	2011–2013	Discovery Channel UK; Discovery Channel (United States)	co-production with Edge West Productions
Sunday Brunch	2012–present	Channel 4	inherited from Princess Productions, Remarkable Television and RDF Television

=== IWC Media ===
IWC Media is a major Scottish/British television production company based that is known for creating popular and award-winning factual TV programming. It is a subsidiary of Banijay UK which turned to be part of French production group Banijay Entertainment, it was formed in 2004 through the merger of Ideal World Productions and Wark Clements. Based in Glasgow and London, it creates popular and award-winning factual, documentary, and reality TV programs for major broadcasters like the BBC, Channel 4, and Sky.

IWC Media was established in March 2004, when London-based British television production studio Ideal World Productions and Glasgow-based Scottish production outfit Wark Clements to establish a new Glasgow-based British/Scottish independent media production company entitled IWC Media, with Wark Clements' co-founder Alan Clements became managing director & chairman of the new British/Scottish independent production outfit IWC Media while Ideal World Productions' co-founders Zad Rogers and Hamish Barbour had been served as creative directors of the new studio. Meanwhile, Eileen Quinn had become IWC Media's head of drama of its drama division and Adam Barker had been promoted to become its director of factual department.

Two moths May 2004 following the establishment of IWC Media by the merger of Ideal World Productions and Wark Clements back in March of that year, IWC Media had signed a first-look two year drama distribution partnership with FremantleMedia via Fremantle International Distribution to develop & distribute IWC Media's drama programming output produced by IWC Media's drama division starting with Meet the Magoons.

In October 2005, RDF Media Group who previously partnered with IWC Media was in exclusive talks to acquire IWC Media in order for RDF to expand their regional production outputs. The deal would could expand RDF's factual production activities with the Scottish production company. Two months later in December of that same year, RDF Media Group completed their acquisition of IWC Media with Alan Clements remained CEO and president of the acquired company

IWC Media alongside its Swedish/French production & distribution parent Zodiak Media had merged with French-based independent international television production and distribution company Banijay Group in February 2016, with IWC Media's parent Zodiak Media being folded into Banijay Group as IWC Media became Banijay's new British television production subsidiary with Banijay's international distribution arm Banijay Rights started distributing IWC Media's programmes.

==== Productions ====
Title	Years	Network	Notes
Location, Location, Location	2000–present	Channel 4	
Meet the Magoons	2005	Channel 4	
Extreme Fishing with Robson Green	2008–2011	Channel 5	
The Planners Are Coming	2008–2009	BBC One	
Lost Kingdoms of Africa	2010–2012	BBC Four	
Robson's Extreme Fishing Challenge	2012–2014	Channel 5	
Robson Green: Extreme Fisherman	2014–2021	Quest	
Lost Kingdoms of Central America	2014	BBC Four	
Wild Things	2015–2017	Sky One	co-production with Motion Content Group and Mad Monk
The Big Scottish Book Club	2019–present	BBC Scotland	
Shelf Isolation	2020–present	BBC Scotland	
Susan Calman's Grand Day Out	2021–present	Channel 5	co-production with Motion Entertainment
Susan Calman's Grand Week By the Sea	2021–2023	Channel 5	
Once Upon a True Crime	2022	Crime & Investigation	co-production with Motion Content Group
The Agency: Unfiltered	2023–present	BBC Scotland	
Fortress Britain	2023	Channel 4	co-production with Brainchild Productions and Brightside Media
Outrageous Homes	2024–present	Channel 4	Took over production from Beyond Productions North

=== Mam Tor Productions ===
Mam Tor Productions is a British drama production company that is part of Banijay UK.

== Awards and nominations ==
Year	Association	Category	Nominees	Result
2017	Diversity in Media Awards	TV Moment of the Year	Black Mirror – San Junipero	Nominated
2017	Diversity in Media Awards	Production Company of the Year	Tiger Aspect Productions	Nominated
