= All3Media =

British media company

All3Media Limited
- Final logo used from 2021 to 2026
- Type: Private
- Industry: Television production
- Founded: 1993; 33 years ago
- Founders: Steve Morrison; David Liddiment; Jules Burns; John Pfeil
- Defunct: 9 July 2026; 3 months ago
- Fate: Merged with Banijay Entertainment; brand retained on production divisions
- Successor: Banijay Entertainment; Studio Ramsay Global
- Headquarters: London, United Kingdom
- Key people: Jane Turton (CEO); Sara Geater (COO); Jeff Zucker (chairman)
- Owner: Bridgepoint Group (2003–2006); Permira (2006–2014); Discovery, Inc. (2014–2022, 50%); Warner Bros. Discovery (2022–2024, 50%); Liberty Global (2014–2024, 50%); RedBird IMI (2024–2026)
- Divisions: All3Media America; All3Media Belgium; All3Media Deutschland; All3Media International
- Subsidiaries: Company Pictures; Lime Pictures; Maverick Television; Neal Street Productions; North One Television; Objective Media Group; Optomen; Raw; South Pacific Pictures; Studio Lambert; Two Brothers Pictures
- Website: all3media.com

All3Media Limited, formerly known as Chrysalis Visual Entertainment and Chrysalis TV Group, was a British worldwide independent television, film, and digital production and distribution company based in London. The All3Media group consists of more than 40 production and distribution companies and labels from the United Kingdom and all other parts of Europe (IDTV in the Netherlands and All3Media Deutschland in Germany), New Zealand (South Pacific Pictures) and the United States. The company merged with Banijay Entertainment on July 9, 2026.

== History ==
In December 1993, Chrysalis Visual Entertainment took full control of British drama production company Red Rooster by acquiring the remaining 50% stake that they didn't own, making Red Rooster a fully-owned subsidiary of Chrysalis Visual Entertainment while the British TV production group appointed Oscar-winning filmmaker and film producer David Puttnam to become its key advisor for Chrysalis' TV production group and the main parent group Chrysalis Group itself.

In 1998, Chrysalis Visual Entertainment bought a 33% stake in the New Zealand independent production company South Pacific Pictures,marking Chrysalis Visual Entertainment's first entry into the New Zealand production market.

In February 2001, Chrysalis Visual Entertainment restructured its British-based entertainment production subsidiaries with Chrysalis Visual Entertainment's drama programming output coming under scripted production subsidiary Bentley Productions. Chrysalis Visual Entertainment also formed a new production division entitled Chrysalis Entertainment with Chrysalis' production units: Assembly Film and Television, Red Rooster Film & Television Entertainment, Tandem Television and Watchmaker Productions, being placed into the new production unit based in Notting Hill, with Managing Director of Watchmaker Productions, Elaine Bedell, becoming MD of the new unit Chrysalis Entertainment.

In May 2001, Chrysalis Visual Entertainment expanded into the Irish production industry by acquiring a 50% stake in Dublin-based Irish production company Eclipse Television & Video.

In June 2001, Chrysalis Visual Entertainment was renamed to Chrysalis TV Group.

By December 2001, Chrysalis TV Group increased its stake in South Pacific Pictures from 33% to a 60% majority stake and made it a subsidiary.

Chrysalis TV Group was renamed to All3Media in 2003 after it was acquired from Chrysalis with the backing of the Bridgepoint Group. The "3" refers to a consortium led by ex-Granada plc chief Steve Morrison, his fellow colleagues Jules Burns & John Pfiel, who were Granada's managing directors of group operations, and former ITV programming chief David Liddiment.

At the start of January 2004, All3Media established its international formats sales division to handle adaptations of All3Media's formats to international broadcasters in other countries.

In 2004, All3Media acquired Lion Television alongside its Scottish division and Lion's American productions offices based in both Los Angeles & Miami and its Beijing production office (via a joint venture with Chinese television broadcaster Phoenix Television) in order for All3Media to expand the group across the Atlantic and the Asian regions that would give turnover of at least £115m. Lion's American offices became All3Media's own American and Chinese production services while Lion Television's co-founders Jeremy Mills and Richard Bradley continued leading Lion Television.

In June 2005, the company acquired Mersey Television the creator of the soap operas Brookside and Hollyoaks in the company's 10th acquisition since 2003. It was renamed as Lime Pictures in 2006.

In 2006, All3Media was acquired by Permira and the All3Media management team including chief executive Steve Morrison.

In February 2007, All3Media announced that they were expanding their operations to Germany by making an agreement to acquire Cologne-based German independent television production company MME Moviement, with All3Media's German division Pertus Zehnte being renamed to All3Media Deutschland. In June 2007, All3Media announced that they had acquired the Birmingham-based independent production company behind 10 Years Longer, Maverick Television, for an undisclosed sum, expanding All3Media's British television production portfolio. Maverick Television would continue to operate independently within All3Media under its own name. Two months later, All3Media announced that they had acquired Andrew O'Conner's magic & comedy production company Objective Productions, bringing All3Media's number of companies to 12 and expanding its scripted operations into the comedy genre. Its founders Michael Vine and Andrew O’Connor continued leading the acquired comedy production studio.

In June 2008, All3Media announced that they had acquired the American-based unscripted television production company Zoo Productions, making the company's first American acquisition as the group would start producing American versions of its programming, while its founders Barry Poznick and John Stevens would continue to lead Zoo Productions. All3Media International would distribute Zoo Productions's future programming worldwide.

In August 2010, All3Media announced that it had acquired independent unscripted television production company Optomen Television along with its American television production division, Optomen Productions US, and its joint venture production subsidiary with TV chef Gordon Ramsay, One Potato Two Potato, for £40m, expanding All3Media's television production operations into the cooking portfolio.

In June 2012, All3Media announced it had sold its cooking-based production subsidiary Cactus TV (which All3Media had brought under its former name, Chrysalis TV Group, back in August 1994) back to its co-founders Amanda Ross and her husband Simon Ross for an undisclosed sum, effectively returning as an independent production company operating at a new studio in South London.

In December 2012, All3Media announced that they had launched a US production arm in Los Angeles named All3Media America.

In 2013, it was named the top UK independent producer, with a turnover of £473m.

On 8 May 2014, it was announced that Discovery, Inc. and Liberty Global would acquire All3Media, in a joint venture valued at US$930 million. In March 2015, All3Media announced that they had made a deal to acquire Sam Mendes' film, TV & theatre production company Neal Street Productions.

In January 2016, All3Media announced that they had acquired Charlie Pattinson's British drama production company New Pictures to expand their drama development output and their British television production operations, with Patterson continuing to run the company within All3Media. On 26 April 2016, British chef and producer Gordon Ramsay formed a partnership with the All3Media group, and they launched a joint venture called Studio Ramsay. The company would be fully owned by Ramsay, but had support from the All3Media company to develop and produce unscripted shows, with All3Media handling distribution rights to the shows. However, five years later, on 4 August 2021, Gordon Ramsay announced a major overall deal with Fox Entertainment by launching a new production company called Studio Ramsay Global, with All3Media selling their stake in the partnership of Ramsay's then-current company Studio Ramsay to Fox Entertainment.

In February 2017, All3Media announced that they had acquired British television production company Two Brothers Pictures, with the company's founders Harry and Jack Williams continuing to lead the acquired company and All3Media International, the international division of All3Media, acquiring distribution rights to the shows that Two Brothers produced. Also on 3 May of that year, All3Media acquired two production companies, Raw and Betty TV, from its former owner Discovery Communications.

On 11 January 2018, the company's American arm launched production company Woodland Park Productions, which would produce unscripted content and would be under All3Media's American division. In December 2018, All3Media announced that they had entered the sports production genre by acquiring British international sports production company Aurora Media Worldwide. In May 2019, All3Media announced that they had launched scripted production label West Road Pictures, with Blood producer Jonathan Fisher as their managing director.

On 15 October 2019, the company launched a new factual production company Angelica Films with former BBC and Field Day executive Sally Angel. But on 31 October 2022, Angelica Films left All3Media, becoming an independent company once again. On 24 September 2020, BBC Studios announced their intention to sell their stake in their German joint venture with All3Media, Tower Productions, and launch their own German division, BBC Studios Germany Productions. The sale took effect at the end of 2020. In December 2020, All3Media announced that they had acquired leading natural history film and television production company Silverback Films, the producer of the Netflix series Our Planet.

On 17 May 2021, it was announced that Discovery, which co-owned All3Media, would be acquiring AT&T subsidiary WarnerMedia and merging with it to form Warner Bros. Discovery. On 11 June 2021, All3Media acquired NENT Studios UK from Nordic Entertainment Group (now known as Viaplay Group). They later merged its operations with All3Media's international division. The Warner Bros. Discovery merger was completed by 8 April 2022. In August 2022, All3Media announced that they had merged two of their subsidiaries, which were Birmingham-based production company Maverick Television and the Glasgow-based division of Objective Media Group named Objective Media Group Scotland, to form a factual and factual entertainment production company within Objective Media Group named 141 Productions.

On 31 May 2023, co-owner Warner Bros. Discovery announced it was selling its stake to ITV plc. While the deal didn't reach an agreement in July 2023, with Mediawan, Banijay, and Sony remaining as potential buyers, ITV later told investors that they were "no longer actively exploring a deal but still continuing to monitor the situation". Banijay was reported to be a potential buyer as of August. After the auction for All3Media began in September 2023, three frontrunners emerged in the final stages of auction the next month: Goldman Sachs, Peter Chernin's The North Road Company and Banijay, with Sony and Fremantle dropping out of contention. On 12 December 2023, RedBird IMI, a joint venture between New York-based private equity firm RedBird Capital Partners and Abu Dhabi-based International Media Investments (IMI), was reported to be the frontrunner, with the company in advanced talks with Warner Bros. Discovery and Liberty Global to acquire the company for around £1 billion ($1.26 billion) in a deal that could be completed before the end of the year. It was also reported that Banijay had dropped out of contention the previous week, with the North Road Company and Goldman Sachs also exiting.

On February 16, 2024, RedBird IMI confirmed that they would be acquiring All3Media from Warner Bros. Discovery and Liberty Global for £1.15 billion, with the deal expected to close sometime in the second or third quarter of the year, pending regulatory approval. On May 16, 2024, the sale was announced to have been completed, making it the single largest acquisition made by RedBird IMI. RedBird IMI's CEO Jeff Zucker was made chairman of All3Media, while Jane Turton and Sara Geater would remain CEO and COO of the company respectively.

On 4 November 2024, All3Media strengthened its scripted portfolio with the establishment of a new scripted production subsidiary named Sunburnt Penguin which would produce comedy and drama programming with former Merman co-founder and producer Clelia Mountford serving as president.

On 23 November 2024, Sky News reported that CVC Capital Partners, TF1, RedBird Capital Partners, All3Media, Mediawan, and Kohlberg Kravis Roberts had been linked to a potential takeover bid for ITV plc and a possible break-up of core assets including ITV Studios and ITVX.

On 30 January 2025, Reuters reported that RedBird IMI were in early-stage talks with ITV plc to merge the All3Media and ITV Studios production businesses.

In September 2025, All3Media established a new unscripted label known as Seamonster TV, led by Lime Pictures executives Mirella Breda and Sam Pollard; the unit was designed as a "feeder label" that would focus on developing formats to license to outside producers, rather than producing them in-house. On September 11, 2025, All3Media closed its scripted studio Seven Stories.

On 3 March 2026, All3Media and Banijay Entertainment announced their intent to merge, which would create a company with a total valuation of US$8 billion and estimated combined revenues of €4.4 billion. The merged company would be led by Banijay CEO Marco Bassetti, and would be equally owned by Banijay Group and RedBird IMI. The merger was completed on 9 July 2026, with All3Media-branded units like All3Media America (with the exception of All3Media International, which was folded into Banijay Rights) retaining their current names.

== Companies ==
All3Media operates a diverse portfolio of over 40 production and distribution companies globally. Its subsidiaries are organized into functional and geographic divisions:

Scripted and Film

- Company Pictures
- Lime Pictures
- Neal Street Productions
- New Pictures
- Seven Stories (Closed 2025)
- South Pacific Pictures
- Two Brothers Pictures

Unscripted and Factual

- 141 Productions
- Aurora Media Worldwide
- Lion Television
- Maverick Television
- North One Television
- Optomen
- Raw
- Silverback Films
- Studio Lambert

Entertainment and Comedy

- IDTV (Netherlands)
- Objective Media Group
- West Road Pictures

Digital and International

- All3Media Deutschland (Germany)
- All3Media International
- Little Dot Studios

The group's 2026 merger with Banijay involves the integration of these labels into a larger combined creative network.

== Important rights held ==
- Call the Midwife
- The Circle
- The Cube
- Fleabag
- The Gadget Show
- Gogglebox
- Great British Menu
- The Traitors
- Hollyoaks
- Homes Under the Hammer
- Lingo
- Midsomer Murders
- The Max Headroom character - held by All3Media as of November 2007.
- Operation Ouch!
- Peep Show
- Shameless (British TV series)
- Shortland Street
- Skins (British TV series)
- Undercover Boss

== See also ==
- List of All3Media television programmes
