= Tele Images Productions =

French animation studio

- Formerly: Tele Images Kids (1999–2010)
- Type: Subsidiary
- Industry: production de films institutionnels et publicitaires
- Founded: 1983; 43 years ago
- Founders: Simone Harari; Philippe Alessandri
- Defunct: 2016; 10 years ago
- Fate: Kids merged into Zodiak Kids Studios and Television folded into Banijay Entertainment
- Successor: Banijay Entertainment; Banijay Kids & Family
- Parent: Tele Images Group (1983–2006); Marathon Group (2006–2008); Zodiak Media (2008–2011); Zodiak Kids Studios (2011–2016)
- Website: teleimages.fr (archived 5 December 2013)

Tele Images Productions (formerly Tele Images Kids) was a French television production company established in 1983 by Simone Harari that produces children's television programs in animation and live-action, with Philippe Alessandri joining in 1998 to spearhead animation production.

The company became part of Marathon Group in 2006, which was then acquired by Zodiak Media in 2008 and subsequently placed under Zodiak Kids Studios in 2011 until it was merged into its final parent in 2016.

== History ==
In January 2000, Tele Images announced that they had joined forces with GTV Productions president Christian Charret with the buy out of the remaining shares of GTV Productions from French film studio Gaumont in order for Gaumont to focus on its film production activities and had it merged with GTV Productions as the latter became a subsidiary of Tele Images whilst retaining the GTV name being retained as Tele Images began distributing GTV's programming library and its series worldwide through Tele Images' distribution division Tele Images International.

In June 2004, Groupe Tele Images announced that they have acquired Adventure Line Productions from Studio Expand after Canal+ announced that they are selling their Studio Expand companies.

By September 2005, Groupe Tele Images and their former British-based European parent firm company Bridgepoint Capital (who had brought Tele Images back in December 1998) announced that they've established a deal with another French animation production company Marathon Media to have the two companies merge together into creating the biggest major production and distribution group based in France with Tele Images along with its subsidiaries GTV Productions and Adventure Line Production will become part of the group. The following year in January 2006, Groupe Tele Images had completed their merger with Marathon Media into forming the biggest production distribution group with the combined entity was subsequently named Marathon Group, with founder Simone Harari stepping down in the process.

In July 2007, Italian publisher De Agostini had announced that they have purchase Tele Images' parent company Marathon Group, which included Tele Images, By the following year in May 2008, Tele Images' parent company Marathon Group and its owner De Agostini had announced that they have made a deal to acquire Swedish-based Scandinavian international television production and distribution company Zodiak Television AB that could bring Tele Images along with its parent company Marathon Group into the acquired production and distribution company. Five months later in November of that same year, Tele Images' parent company Marathon Group and its owner De Agostini had announced that they have completed their acquisition of Swedish-based Scandinavian international television production and distribution company Zodiak Television AB with Tele Images and its parent company being folded into the acquired company as they turned Zodiak Television AB from European production empire into a single entertainment powerhouse and had changed the latter's name to Zodiak Entertainment with Tele Images becoming part of the rebranded company

In September 2010, Tele Images Kids had announced that they have rebranded as Tele Images Productions following their diversification into the television drama and series with the producer of Tele Images' former parent group Marathon Group. Arnaud Figaret had been named producer and vice-president of the rebranded company.

In February 2011, Zodiak Media Group had announced that they have regrouped Tele Images Productions alongside fellow French animation studio Marathon Media and British television production studio The Foundation under Zodiak Kids.

In late-November 2014, Tele Images Productions and their parent Zodiak Kids had announced that the latter's founder and president & the CEO of Zodiak Media's other production subsidiary Marathon Images Philippe Alessandri was stepping down as their president after founded Tele Images 16 years with Benoît Runel was being succeeded by their parent Zodiak Kids as they named him the new managing director of Zodiak Kids France and will run Tele Images Productions and Zodiak Kids' other subsidiary Marathon Media.

In 2016, Banijay merged with Zodiak, with Banijay as the surviving entity. Tele Images was merged into Zodiak Kids Studios shortly afterwards.
