= FCF =

FCF may refer to:

== Sport ==
- Cape Verdean Football Federation (Portuguese: Federação Caboverdiana de Futebol)
- Catalan Football Federation (Catalan: Federació Catalana de Futbol)
- Colombian Football Federation (Spanish: Federación Colombiana de Fútbol)
- FC Flora, a football club in Tallinn, Estonia
- FC Fredericia, a football club in Denmark
- 1. FC Frankfurt, a football club in Germany
- FC Fyn, a defunct Danish football club
- Fan Controlled Football, a professional indoor football league created in 2017

== Other uses ==
- Fair Consideration Framework, in Singapore
- False Creek Ferries, in Vancouver, Canada
- Family Care Foundation
- FCF Minerals Corporation, a Philippine mining company
- Felidae Conservation Fund
- Feline Conservation Federation
- First Commonwealth Bank
- Free cash flow
- Fremont Correctional Facility, in Colorado, United States
- Frontiersmen Camping Fellowship
- For Coloring Food, used to indicate food colors approved by FDA. See Food Coloring.
- Fairchild Channel F, a video console
- Future Commando Force
