= Banijay Iberia =

Iberian production division of Banijay Entertainment

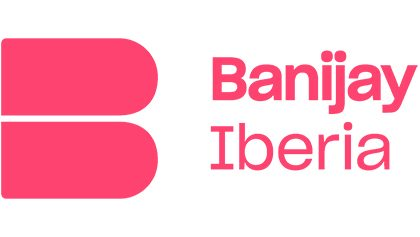
- Formerly: Endemol Shine Iberia (2015–2020)
- Founded: February 15, 2015; 11 years ago
- Headquarters: Av. de Burgos, 89, Edificio 1, Modulo B, Planta Baja, Fuencarral-El Pardo, 28050 Madrid, Spain
- Key people: Pilar Blasco (CEO)
- Parent: Endemol Shine Group (2015–2020); Banijay Entertainment (2020–)
- Divisions: Banijay Iberia Sports
- Subsidiaries: Cuarzo Producciones; Diagonal TV; DLO Producciones; Endemol Portugal; Gestmusic; IMA; LALIGA Studios; Pokeepsie Films; Portocabo; Shine Iberia; Tuwiok Estudios; Zeppelin Television

Banijay Iberia, formerly known as Endemol Shine Iberia, is the Iberian major television production and entertainment powerhouse in Spain and Portugal that is a division of French entertainment production group Banijay Entertainment. Formed in March 2015 and led by CEO Pilar Blasco, it brings together top independent fiction and unscripted production labels across the Iberian region as part of the global Banijay Entertainment group.

== History ==
Logo used until 2020.

Banijay Iberia was first established in March 2015, when Dutch production and distribution company Endemol Shine Group announced that it had established a production & creative hub based in both Madrid & Barcelona that brings all of its production companies in Spain and Portugal, which were Endemol Portugal, Shine Iberia, Diagonal TV, Gestmusic, Telegenia, Zeppelin Television and Tuiwok Studios, into one Iberian production division entitled Endemol Shine Iberia with the new production division had appointed Endemol Spain MD Pilar Blasco to become its president & CEO of the new production unit while Jordi Bosch became chairman of the new production hub and Javier Garcia became CFO & CCO.

In July 2020, Endemol Shine Iberia's parent Endemol Shine Group had been merged with French international television production giant Banijay Group, turning the latter company into a global international production and distribution titan and had upscaled its operations from its then-current 16 territories to 22 while Banijay had rebranded Endemol Shine's Iberian production arm Endemol Shine Iberia as its own Iberian production division renamed Banijay Iberia with Banijay's own Spanish production subsidiaries Cuarzo Producciones, Portocabo and DLO/Magnolia had been placed to Endemol Shine Iberia. Two weeks later in that month following the acquisition of Endemol Shine Iberia's Dutch international production parent Endemol Shine Group by Banijay Group and the renaming of Endemol Shine Iberia to Banijay Iberia of that same month, Banijay Iberia had appointed Pilar Blasco to become president of the newly named Banijay Iberia division as president & CEO.

In October 2024 one year after Banijay Iberia had collaborated with Spanish professional association football league La Liga to establish a joint-venture production subsidiary La Liga Studios back in 2023, Banijay Iberia had upped their investment Spanish sports during the MIPCOM Cannes by launching its own Spanish in-house sports production division named Banijay Iberia Sports, the new Spanish sports production arm Banijay Sports would focus on developing & produce original sports-related programming content with Banijay Iberia Sports had appointed Spanish personality, radio contributor, and sports commentator Gonzalo Miró to lead Banijay Iberia's newly created Sports production arm as director.

== Subsidiaries ==
=== Diagonal TV ===
Diagonal Televisió, S.L.U. (also known as Diagonal TV) is a prominent Spanish audiovisual production company that is a subsidiary of Banijay Iberia, based in Barcelona, the company established on November 12, 1997, by Jaume Banacolocha and the company specializes in creating popular television series, miniseries, and feature films.

==== Television productions ====
Title	Years	Broadcaster	Notes
El súper: Historias de todos los días	1996–1999	Telecinco	co-production with Zeppelin Television and Estudios Picasso
Amar en tiempos revueltos	2005–2012	La 1	
90-60-90, diario secreto de una adolescente	2009	Antena 3	
Amar es para siempre	2013–2024	Antena 3	A continuation of Amar en tiempos revueltos by Josep Maria Benet i Jornet, Antonio Onetti and Rodolf Sirera
Luimelia	2020	Atresplayer Premium	
Return to Las Sabinas	2024–2025	Disney+	

=== DLO Producciones ===
DLO Producciones (Day Light On) is a prominent Spanish television and film production company based in Madrid, founded in 2011 by José Manuel Lorenzo, it has been part of the French international media group Banijay Entertainment since 2013 under its Spanish production arm Banijay Iberia, and is widely recognized for producing high-profile scripted drama series and feature films for major networks and streaming platforms.

In July 2013, French international productiom group Banijay Group had acquired Spanish drama and entertainment production company DLO Producciones in order to expand its Spanish production operations, it became Banijay Group's second Spanish production label and its first entry into the Spanish scripted genre with DLO's founder José Manuel Lorenzo had continued to run the studio under Banijay.

==== Filmography ====
Title	Years	Network	Notes
Dime Quién Soy: Mistress of War	2020–2021	Movistar+ Peacock (United States)	co-production with Telemundo International Studios and Beta Film
El Inmortal. Gangs of Madrid	2022	Movistar+	co-production with Telemundo International Studios

=== Shine Iberia ===
Shine Iberia is the major television production subsidiary of Banijay Iberia, founded in June 2011. It produces and develops original entertainment formats, adapts international hits, and produces television drama and documentaries across Spain and Portugal.

Shine Iberia was formed at the start of June 2011, when its former British production/distribution parent Shine Group announced that they've expanding their operations into Spain and Portugal by setting up a new regional Iberian production division based in Madrid, Spain & Lisbon, Portugal, which was named Shine Iberia & it would produce major television programs, original content, and local adaptations of successful international formats from Shine Group's catalog for the Spanish & Portuguese markets with Macarena Rey, the general director of BocaBoca Productions, will be heading the new division as its CEO.

In July 2023, Shine Iberia announced that its production manager Helder Marques had been promoted to become managing director of Shine Iberia's programming made in Portugal and would oversee all of Shine Iberia's programming made in Portugal as an executive producer.

==== Filmography ====
Title	Years	Channel	Notes
The Voice Portugal	2011–present	RTP1	Took over production from CBV and ITV Studios
MasterChef	2013–present	La 1	
The Voice Kids	2014–present	RTP1	co-production with Talpa Media (season 1); Took over production from ITV Studios starting with season 5.
Jugamos en Casa	2015	La 1	
MasterChef Celebrity	2016–present	La 1	
Mesaluisa	2020	SIC Mulher	
Bosé	2022	Paramount+	Originally ordered at Movistar Plus+; co-production with ViacomCBS International Studios, Elefantec Global and Legacy Rock Entertainment
Generacion Porno	2023	ETB 2 & TV3	

=== Tuiwok Estudios ===
Tuiwok Estudios is the leading digital content production company and talent management agency division of Banijay Iberia that is based in Madrid, Spain, the studio focuses on online video strategies, multi-platform digital creation, and influencer-driven content & it creates original video content, branded campaigns, and web series for digital platforms and streaming services such as YouTube and Tiktok.

It was established in April 2013, when Banijay Iberia, known as Endemol Spain at that time, had entered the online digital video and influencer marketing genre & had partnered with YouTube to establish its own leading digital content production subsidiary and talent management agency entitled Tuiwok Estudios, the new digital production subsidiary would focus on producing original digital content across all genres including comedy, reality, talent, and lifestyle format with Felipe Jiménez Lunas leading the new subsidiary as director as Tuiwok Estuduos had launched four YouTube channels called Tuiwok Comedia, Tuiwok Talenta, Tuiwok Estillo and Tuiwok Reality,.
