= Cuarzo Producciones =

Spanish television production company

Cuarzo Producciones S.L.
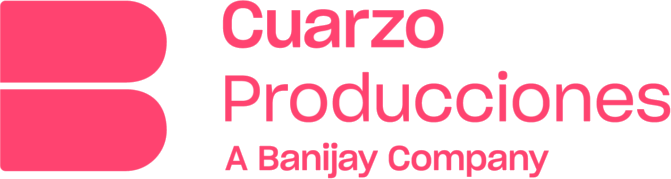
- Type: Subsidiary
- Founded: December 2000; 25 years ago
- Founder: Ana Rosa Quintana
- Headquarters: Madrid, Spain
- Owner: Banijay Entertainment (2010–)
- Parent: Banijay Iberia
- Website: www.cuarzotv.com

Cuarzo Prodcciones S.L. is a Spanish television production company that was founded in December 2000 by Spanish journalist & television presenter Ana Rosa Quintana and currently owned by French production group Banijay Entertainment under their Spanish division Banijay Iberia.

In January 2009, French production & distribution group Banijay Group took a 51% majority stake in Cuarzo Productions, this marked Banijay Entertainment's entry into the Spanish television market and its fifth European acquisition.

== Filmography ==
Title	Years	Network	Notes
¿Dónde estás corazón?	2003–2011	Antena 3	
Herederos	2007–2009	La 1	
Vaya Par	2009	Antena 3	
Cuarto milenio	2011–2018	Cuarto	
Sex Academy	2011–2012	Cuarto	
Se enciende la noche	2013–2014	Telecinco	
¡Mira quién Salta!	2013–2014	Telecinco	co-production with DLO Producciones
¿Te lo vas a comer?	2018–present	La Sexta	
