= Little Dot Studios =

British digital network & production company

- Type: Subsidiary
- Industry: Digital Media
- Founded: 21 March 2013; 13 years ago
- Founders: Andy Taylor; Selma Turajlic
- Owner: All3Media (2013-2026); Banijay Entertainment (2026-present)
- Parent: Banijay UK (2026-present)
- Website: www.littledotstudios.com

Little Dot Studios is a British digital content agency, production company, and media network owned by All3Media. Founded in March 2013 by Andy Taylor and Selma Turajlic, Little Dot Studios specializes in digital strategy, social video management, production, and monetization for major brands, boasting over 135 owned-and-operated digital channels and 7 FAST channels.

== History ==
It was established on 21 March 2013, when All3Media had entered the digital media business when its commercial and digital media director Andy Taylor and head of interactive media at All3Media's international distribution arm All3Media International, Selma Turajlic, to form a digital content studio entitled Little Dot Studios that would focus on producing & distributing premium content for platforms like YouTube and managing digital brands for broadcasters with Andy Taylor and Selma Turajlic became co-president of the content studio while Little Dot Studios would manage All3Media's 50 programming-related channels.

On 4 March 2020, Little Dot Studios had acquired London-based sports production company & content agency WING to strengthen its sports content creation, digital distribution, and high-end film production capabilities, the acquisition of WING had marked Little Dot Studios' first acquisition and the entry into the content agency genre with WING became a subsidiary of the digital company.

In August 2020, Little Dot Studios had acquired the streaming service History Hit from its co-founder & historian Dan Snow with him would work with Little Dot Studios to create online content for the acquired streaming service History Hit.

In March 2026, Little Dot Studios under its American division Little Dot Studios US had partnered with Fred Rogers Productions to establish a new dedicated YouTube channel that would bring the latter company's iconic TV series Mister Rogers' Neighborhood to YouTube for the first time with Little Dot Studios's American division would overseeing & manage the new channel.
