= Banijay Rights =

French television production company

- Formerly: MTV Mastiff International (2003–2005); Zodiak Television World (2005–2008); Zodiak International Distribution (2008–2010); Zodiak Rights (2010–2017)
- Type: Division
- Industry: Distribution
- Predecessors: Banijay International (2009–2017); Beyond Rights; Endemol Shine International; RDF Rights; All3Media International
- Founded: 2003; 23 years ago
- Headquarters: Paris, France
- Area served: Worldwide
- Parent: Zodiak Media (2003–2016); Banijay Entertainment (2016–2026; 2026–present)
- Website: www.banijayrights.com

Banijay Rights (formerly known as MTV Mastiff International, Zodiak Television World, Zodiak International Distribution and Zodiak Rights) is the international distribution division of French production company Banijay Entertainment that distributes programmes produced by Banijay's production companies and by third-party programmes.

== History ==
Banijay Rights had its beginnings in September 2003, when Swedish and later French production group MTV Produktion AB launched its own in-house international distribution division that would distribute all of MTV Produktion AB's programming worldwide called MTV Mastiff International.

One year later in February 2004, MTV Mastiff International appointed Janne Ingdal Andersen to handle format sales for the Asian markets, Israel and the Baltic countries.

In late-August 2007 when Zodiak Television World's parent Zodiak Television announced the acquisition London-based British production & distribution unit Bullseye Television from Roth Media, Bullseye's distribution division Bullseye Distribution was merged into Zodiak Television World as they planning to move from its distribution offices from its home country of Sweden to London, England Three months later in October of that year, Zodiak Television World named former SDI Media and Disney executive John Coleman to become their operation manager along with Sarah Coursey joining Zodiak Television World as their head of formats and acquisitions.

In February 2016 when Zodiak Rights' parent company Zodiak Media merged with French production and distribution company Banijay Group to become the world's largest indie production company, Banijay Group's own international distribution division Banijay International had been folded into the acquired Zodiak's international distribution division Zodiak Rights whilst retaining its name as CEO Tim Mutimer became head of distribution at Banijay's newly merged distribution unit Zodiak Rights.

In January 2017 one year after the merger of French production company Banijay Group with Swedish/French production & distribution company Zodiak Media.

In December 2019, Banijay Rights announced the acquisition of Italian/Spanish production and distribution company Funwood Media.

In January 2023, Banijay Rights' parent company Banijay announced it had completed its acquisition of Australian production & distribution company Beyond International alongside its distribution arm Beyond Rights with Beyond International's programming catalogue being placed into Banijay Rights as it had merged Beyond's distribution division into Banijay Rights who had started distributing Beyond's back catalogue.
