= Coming Up Roses =

Coming Up Roses may refer to:

== Film ==
- Coming Up Roses (1986 film)
- Coming Up Roses (2011 film)

== Songs ==
- "Coming Up Roses" (Curve song), 1998
- "Coming Up Roses" (Harry Styles song), 2026
- "Coming Up Roses", a song by Elliott Smith from his eponymous 1995 album
