= Simon's Cat =

British animated cartoon series by Simon Tofield

- The front cover of the Simon's Cat book
- Genre: Physical comedy Slapstick; Animated sitcom
- Created by: Simon Tofield
- Developed by: Simon's Cat Ltd.
- Directed by: Simon Tofield
- Voices of: Simon Tofield
- Country of origin: United Kingdom
- Original language: English
- No. of episodes: 150

Production
- Running time: 1–4 minutes
- Production companies: Simon's Cat Ltd. Tandem Films; ChannelFlip

Original release
- Network: YouTube
- Release: 4 March 2008 – present

Simon's Cat is a British animated web series released in 2008 by writer and creator Simon Tofield, who then expanded Simon's Cat into a book series. The films and books feature a hungry, white cat who uses creative schemes and tactics on his owner in an attempt to get food.

Following the success of its first animated films, it was announced in January 2009 that Simon's Cat would be published in book format. Canongate Books released the first book on October 1st 2009 in the United Kingdom, which was later released in 26 other countries. Since then, 9 more titles have been released.

In June 2012, Walt Disney Animation Studios began releasing specially-made shorts of Simon's Cat. In addition to the shorts, the Daily Mirror ran a Simon's Cat newspaper strip, which ran from 2011 to 2013. Later, in August 2015, it was announced that Endemol Shine UK had acquired a stake in Simon's Cat.

In May 2016, Simon's Cat partnered with the American children's television program Sesame Street as part of their Love to Learn campaign.

Later on, many game developers made a variety of games based on Simon's Cat. In June 2017, the game Simon's Cat Crunch Time was created. In February 2018, Simon's Cat Dash was created, but as of 2023, this game is no longer available to download. In June 2018, the game Simon's Cat Pop Time was created. In April 2021, the Apple Arcade game Simon's Cat Story Time was developed.

== Background ==
Simon Tofield, who has over 14 years of experience with animating commercials for companies such as Marmite and Tesco, came up with the idea for his first short film as a way of teaching himself how to animate using Adobe Flash. He also revealed that the inspiration for the series came from his experiences with his four cats – Teddy, Hugh, Jess, and Maisie, with Hugh being the primary inspiration.

=== Production ===
The series is animated with Adobe Flash Professional (now Adobe Animate) and TVPaint. The pictures are hand-drawn electronically, using an A4-size Wacom Intuos 3 graphics tablet. The animation is completed before the sound is recorded, which is unusual for western animation.

== Characters ==
- Cat: A hungry, white cat, the main character and the star of the show. His antics include his quest for food. His signature gesture is to point at his mouth or bowl and meow when hungry, and other ways of vexing his "owner", Simon. Besides eating, he also enjoys chasing birds, mice, and catching fish out of Simon's pond. His efforts in these endeavors create a significant amount of the humour in the book. He has not been officially named, although writer Simon says that he is based on his own cat, Hugh (in the show, Simon has been hinted to call his cat Gilbert).
- Simon Tofield: A human, the long-suffering owner of Cat and a graphic artist. He is shown as good-natured, gentle, easily startled, and accident-prone. As shown in the episodes "Scary Legs", "Scaredy Cat", "Spider Cat" and "Bat Cat", he has arachnophobia. Simon is from Leighton Buzzard, Bedfordshire.
- Kitten: A kitten, the playful little brother and the sidekick of Cat, who first appeared in the episode "Double Trouble". He was brought home by Simon in October 2011. In spite of his tender age, he appears to be considerably smarter and more cunning than his big brother. Kitten will point to his mouth or bowl and mew when hungry, just like his big brother. Like Cat, Kitten has not been officially named, but is based on Tofield's fourth cat, Teddy. Full-colour media reveal that Kitten is light grey.
- Simon's Sister's Dog (named Oscar): A dog who first appeared in the episode "Fed Up!", in which he is fed underneath the table by Simon and the family. He also appears in the book and he likes to play fetch. It is revealed that his name is Oscar.
- Bird: A bird or robin whom Cat chases. He generally outsmarts him. And is also featured as a squeaking toy bird or even a Christmas ornament.
- Hedgehog: A hedgehog who lives in Simon's back garden. Cat likes to annoy him by impaling objects such as apples, leaves, and tennis balls onto his prickles. He has children and he also has a girlfriend named Daisy, who is a hedgehog like him.
- Bunny: A rabbit who lives in Simon's garden. She has the ability to hop and run in circles around Cat.
- Squirrel: A squirrel who lives in a tree in Simon's backyard. He loves to pelt Cat with acorns when he chases him.
- Garden Gnome: A garden gnome who likes to go fishing. He is similar to the one broken by Cat in the episode "Let Me In". He is seen holding either a fishing rod, a net or sometimes a checkered flag in the episode "Ready, Steady, Slow!". Cat often tries to get him to help in his schemes to catch food. Cat considers him a friend, apparently unaware that he is an inanimate object.
- Toad: A toad who lives in Simon's garden. He is similar to Frog.
- Frog: A frog who lives in Simon's garden. He appears in some episodes as well, and he is differentiated from Toad in the "How to Draw... Frogs and Toads" video as well as in the "Simon Draws" section of the Kitten Chaos book.
- Chloe: A girl cat who wears a heart collar. She is the love interest of Cat. Chloe is depicted as demure and somewhat snobbish, as well as exhibiting a finicky appetite, munching on a trail of cat treats or even butterflies, but angrily refusing Mouse offered by Cat.
- Mouse: A mouse who is often chased by Cat. Despite their adversarial relationship, he aids Cat in an elaborate plot intended to impress Chloe in the episode "Smitten", later helping him to get food in another.
- Maisy: A Tabby cat who likes Cat, even though it is shown that he has grown to be terrified of her.
- Crow: A crow who sometimes annoys Cat.
- Jazz: A grumpy territorial Persian cat and arch-nemesis of Cat whom Cat often gets into fights with.
- Teddy: A stray cat living in a box whom Cat befriends. As of late 2022, he appears to have found a forever home. Though he lives with a neighbour, the story of Teddy is actually based on one of Simon's own rescue cats.
- Muffin: A puppy who first appeared in the episode "Pup sitting". He is playful when Simon feeds him dog treats. He is shown to be energetic, but also scared of rain and lightning.
- Tess: Tess is the owner of Teddy and a neighbour of Simon.
- Simon's Sister: She is the owner of Muffin and, like Simon, is from Leighton Buzzard, Bedfordshire.

== Episodes ==
=== Main series ===
This is a comprehensive list of all the Black & White (rarely in colour) episodes of Simon's Cat including holiday specials. There are 150 episodes of Simon's Cat, ranging from episodes published between 2008 and 2026.

No.	Title (Simon's Cat in...)	Original YouTube airdate
1	"Cat Man Do"	4 March 2008
Simon's Cat goes to extreme measures to get Simon out of bed in the morning so he can fix Cat his breakfast. "Cat Man Do" won the "Best Comedy" award at the British Animation Awards 2008. First appearance of Simon and Simon's Cat.
2	"Let Me In"	4 March 2008
Cat goes to great lengths to get through the glass rear door until Simon comes to let him in.
3	"TV Dinner"	15 July 2008
Cat just won't leave his master alone for a second as he attempts to watch television. The episode was shown on BBC2's The Culture Show on 15 July 2008 before being released on YouTube.
4	"Fed Up! (Christmas Special)"	8 December 2008
Originally made for the Royal Society for the Prevention of Cruelty to Animals' 2008 "Give Animals A Voice" campaign under the title "Simon's Sister's Dog in: Fed Up!" which did not feature the cat: a lesson in over-consumption goes to an eagerly overeating dog and the family as they drop scraps to eat at the dinner table. (Christmas episode) First appearance of Simon's Sister's Dog
5	"Fly Guy"	24 July 2009
A game of Cat and Fly has undesired results for Simon.
6	"Hot Spot"	28 September 2009
Cat has to find a way to get under the warm glow of his master's drawing lamp. It was released shortly before its book's release.
7	"Snow Business"	10 February 2010
A day of play turns cold when Cat discovers that it is snowing. First appearance of the Bird.
8	"The Box"	18 August 2010
Leaving an empty box unattended around Cat will produce undesired results.
9	"Cat Chat"	7 October 2010
The last thing this hedgehog wants for a gabbing partner is a cat with a short attention span. First animated appearance of the Hedgehog character.
10	"Lunch Break"	12 November 2010
Cat's clever move of pulling the tablecloth out from underneath the dishes could use a little work.
11	"Santa Claws (Christmas Special)"	10 December 2010
Cat's Christmas gives him new trees to climb and new ornaments to paw at. First episode to include theme music at beginning and end.
12	"Sticky Tape"	28 February 2011
Cat meets a new, transparent adversary.
13	"Hop It! (Easter Special)"	21 April 2011
Cat tries to "Easter" into a new routine.
14	"Hidden Treasure"	16 June 2011
A game of catch the ball turns into a treasure hunt when Cat's ball hides itself in the gaping darkness beneath the refrigerator.
15	"Cat & Mouse"	2 September 2011
Cat messes around with the computer mouse.
16	"Double Trouble"	7 October 2011
Cat gets a new hungry flatmate. First appearance of the Kitten.
17	"Catnap"	23 November 2011
Kitten nuzzles in on a sleeping Cat.
18	"Fowl Play (Christmas Special)"	14 December 2011
Cat has plans for Christmas dinner.
19	"Shelf Life"	14 March 2012
Cat causes mischief when walking along a shelf.
20	"Tongue Tied"	25 May 2012
Cat meets a toad.
21	"Window Pain"	9 July 2012
Cat and Kitten thwart Simon's attempts to clean a window.
22	"Ready, Steady, Slow!"	4 August 2012
Cat and friends cheer on a snail race.
23	"Springtime"	4 October 2012
Cat scales to new heights in search of supper.
24	"Fetch"	29 October 2012
Cat plays a disastrous game of fetch with Simon's Sister's Dog.
25	"Nut Again"	23 November 2012
Cat is tormented by a playful but malicious squirrel.
26	"Icecapade"	7 December 2012
Cat tries to catch a fish trapped under a frozen pond, only to be thwarted by the kitten. First appearance of the Gnome.
27	"Feed Me"	4 February 2013
Cat can't wait to be fed.
28	"Screen Grab"	12 April 2013
Cat and Kitten entertain themselves with Simon's flatscreen TV.
29	"Flower Bed"	14 June 2013
Cat waits impatiently to be fed while Simon plants a flower garden.
30	"Suitcase"	2 August 2013
Cat packs Simon's suitcase.
31	"Mirror Mirror"	13 September 2013
Cat sees his own reflection in a mirror on a door.
32	"Scary Legs (Halloween Special)"	25 October 2013
Cat tries to kill a spider, which Simon is afraid of, but the spider doesn't die.
33	"Christmas Presence (Christmas Special part 1)"	7 December 2013
Cat finds a robotic singing Santa Claus dummy.
34	"Christmas Presence (Christmas Special part 2)"	17 December 2013
The Santa Claus dummy is used by Cat to get Kitten out of Cat's bed.
35	"Smitten (Valentine's Day Special)"	3 February 2014
Cat falls in love with another cat and decides to impress her. First appearance of Chloe and the Mouse.
36	"Crazy Time"	3 April 2014
Cat causes another mess in Simon's home, this time from a sudden frenzy.
37	"Pawtrait"	5 June 2014
Cat sabotages Simon's attempt to take a photo of the Kitten.
38	"Hot Water"	31 July 2014
Cat causes a mess in the bathroom while Simon takes a shower.
39	"Washed Up"	5 September 2014
Cat chases a spider into the laundry room, and then tries to take a nap, with disastrous results.
40	"Scaredy Cat (Halloween Special)"	9 October 2014
Cat manages to terrify Simon during Halloween.
41	"Let Me Out"	6 November 2014
Cat wants to be fed, but ruins his owner's morning while waiting for him to come out of the bathroom.
42	"Catnip (Christmas Special)"	4 December 2014
Cat has fun with a catnip toy.
43	"Butterflies (Valentine's Day Special)"	12 February 2015
Simon's Cat tries to impress Chloe by bringing her a box full of butterflies.
44	"April Showers (April Fool's Special)"	2 April 2015
Simon's Cat tries to catch a bird in the lawn on a rainy day, but Kitten scares the bird away and locks the cat outside.
45	"Pizza Cat"	20 August 2015
Cat wants Simon's pizza.
46	"Box Clever"	1 October 2015
Cat does everything possible to avoid a visit to the vet. It's also used in the 12 minute film, "Off to The Vet" (in color).
47	"Pug Life"	5 November 2015
Cat has trouble eating around the cone of shame, and is annoyed by a friendly Pug.
48	"Snow Cat (Christmas Special)"	3 December 2015
A clever cat gets creative out in the cold.
49	"Tough Love (Valentine's Day Special)"	5 February 2016
A curious cat lands himself in big trouble when he meets another female cat. First appearance of Maisy
50	"Fast Track"	8 April 2016
Simon plays slot cars, but Cat spoils the fun.
51	"Field Trip"	13 May 2016
Cat is let loose in the wild.
52	"Muddy Paws"	3 June 2016
Simon's Cat tries to clean the Kitten.
53	"Laser Toy"	15 July 2016
Simon plays with his cat, using a laser toy.
54	"Fish Tank"	5 August 2016
Simon's Cat becomes rivals with a sneaky fish.
55	"Trash Cat"	2 September 2016
Simon's Cat attempts to get a discarded roast chicken out of the trash.
56	"The Monster (Halloween Special)"	21 October 2016
Simon's Cat is frightened by a vacuum cleaner.
57	"Bed Sheets"	2 December 2016
Simon attempts to make up his bed, but the cat and the kitten make it impossible.
58	"Little Box (Christmas Special)"	16 December 2016
Simon's Cat discovers a small box that is trouble for him, but perfect for the Kitten.
59	"Dinner Date: Starters (Valentine's Day Special part 1)"	10 February 2017
A culinary cat helps Simon unpack his groceries.
60	"Dinner Date: Main Course (Valentine's Day Special part 2)"	17 March 2017
Simon's Cat is at it again – spoiling tireless owner Simon's dinner plans.
61	"Dinner Date: Just Desserts (Valentine's Day Special part 3)"	28 April 2017
It's finally time for Simon to serve dinner to his date, but Simon's Cat seems to have other plans.
62	"Copy Cat"	2 June 2017
An inquisitive kitten learns "how to cat". Simon's Cat tries to fool the Kitten in a game of Simon Says.
63	"Waiting Game"	30 June 2017
A curious cat perseveres through the elements.
64	"Bed Head"	4 August 2017
When poor Simon is under the weather, a concerned cat practices his bedside manner.
65	"Scratch Post"	1 September 2017
The claws come out in a case of sibling rivalry.
66	"Spider Cat (Halloween Special)"	6 October 2017
Simon's Cat finally gets into the attic, and gives Simon a spooky surprise while he's there. (Also includes "Scary Legs" and "Scaredy Cat" shorts)
67	"Hambush"	2 November 2017
Simon makes himself a ham sandwich, but Simon's Cat "ham-pers" his attempts. Episode includes "Trash Cat" and "Pizza Cat" shorts.
68	"D.I.Y."	16 November 2017
A curious cat helps his owner with home improvements.
69	"Fast Food (Thanksgiving Special)"	23 November 2017
Simon's Cat and Kitten join forces to gobble down a festive feast.
70	"Kitten Crazy Time"	30 November 2017
Simon's Cat discovers Kitten has his own "crazy time" too.
71	"Fireworks"	8 December 2017
An anxious cat tries to hide from the festive celebrations.
72	"Christmas Yarn (Christmas Special)"	15 December 2017
A playful cat leaves his owner out in the cold.
73	"Head Over Heels (Valentine's Day Special)"	9 February 2018
Simon's Cat has once again fallen in love with Chloe.
74	"Purrthday Cake (A 10th Birthday Special)"	2 March 2018
A loving owner treats his cat to a special birthday cake... full of cat food. This episode commemorates the show's and character's 10th anniversary.
75	"The Tree"	16 March 2018
Simon comes to his cat's rescue after discovering him up a tree meowing for help. This episode is based on a gag that Tofield drew for his book only to happen to him in real life.
76	"Polished Paws"	6 April 2018
Simon polishes and prepares his dining table, but Simon's Cat comes sliding on through.
77	"Stretched Out"	4 May 2018
Simon's Cat takes his time stretching out, even when his master offers him food.
78	"Crow"	27 May 2018
A cawing Crow is determined to disturb Simon's Cat's peace and quiet. First appearance of the Crow.
79	"Armchair Fan"	15 June 2018
Simon's plan to watch the 2018 FIFA World Cup is ruined by his four legged armchair fan.
80	"The Snip"	29 June 2018
An unprepared cat learns what "the snip" means. This short serves as a PSA for viewers to spay and neuter their pets.
81	"Borderline (Jazz Trilogy, Part 1/3)"	10 August 2018
Simon's Cat goes paw to paw with a territorial challenger. First appearance of Jazz
82	"On the Fence (Jazz Trilogy, Part 2/3)"	17 August 2018
A relentless feline nemesis doesn't know when to give up.
83	"Showdown (Jazz Trilogy, Part 3/3)"	24 August 2018
Simon's Cat and the Kitten go paw to paw with Jazz in a final showdown.
84	"Spooked! (Halloween Special)"	12 October 2018
Simon's Cat is seriously spooked by something in his master's bedroom.
85	"Kitten vs. Snake (Halloween Special)"	2 November 2018
The Kitten confronts something "slithery"... and plush.
86	"Festive Feast (Thanksgiving Special)"	16 November 2018
Simon's Cat bites off more than he can chew.
87	"Winter Games (Christmas episode)"	16 December 2018
A competitive cat tries his paw at some Winter Games.
88	"Staircase"	27 January 2019
A mischievous cat plays a dangerous game with Simon on the stairs.
89	"Blind Date (Valentine's Day Special)"	10 February 2019
A romantic cat climbs to new heights in order to find a date.
90	"Bathtime (Missing Cat, Part 1/4)"	29 March 2019
A cute messy cat has an unpleasant bathtime experience.
91	"Hide and Seek (Missing Cat, Part 2/4)"	17 May 2019
A sulking cat plays a game of hide and seek with his cute cat crush, Chloe.
92	"Lost (Missing Cat, Part 3/4)"	14 June 2019
A lost cat scrambles for shelter as his owner searches everywhere for him.
93	"Found (Missing Cat, Part 4/4)"	12 July 2019
Simon makes an attempt to find his cat, who was struggling to find shelter from the rain and was getting hungry. All 4 parts were then re-released back-to-back as a full-colour film two months later.
94	"Sunny Spot"	16 August 2019
Cat's favorite sunny spot is rudely interrupted by his arch nemesis Jazz.
95	"It's a Dog's Life"	4 October 2019
Cat's curiosity has him encountering canines. The short title is based on Tofield's book "Simon's Cat: It's A Dog's Life".
96	"Bat Cat (Halloween Special)"	11 October 2019
Simon is scared of a moth and tries to get the cat to get rid of it. In the process, Simon's flat is invaded by bats.
97	"Kitten vs. Birds"	15 November 2019
The Kitten meets three birds and gets mocked by them.
98	"Christmas Crow (Christmas Special)"	15 December 2019
Cat attempts to decorate a Christmas tree. The Crow makes it difficult.
99	"Lovestruck (Valentine's Day Special)"	7 February 2020
Simon's Cat prepares a feast for Chloe but the Kitten spoils the preparations.
100	"Ambush"	17 April 2020
Cat has had enough of Simon being home all the time. ('At home special' inspired by the COVID-19 pandemic social isolation measures)
101	"The Beginning (Origin Story, Part 1/3)"	29 May 2020
The first meeting of Simon and Baby Simon's Cat wasn't love at first sight, but like any other love story, they were made for each other.
102	"Baby Steps (Origin Story, Part 2/3)"	26 June 2020
Baby Simon's Cat is finally home and ready to familiarize himself with his surroundings.
103	"S.O.S. (Origin Story, Part 3/3)"	24 July 2020
Baby Simon's Cat is here to stay!
104	"Scary Stories (Halloween Special)"	9 October 2020
Cat and the Hedgehog have a good time scaring each other!
105	"Paws for Thought (Thanksgiving Special)"	20 November 2020
Cat pauses for thought when he sees someone in need. First appearance of Teddy.
106	"Little Angel (Christmas Special)"	4 December 2020
Simon's Cat finds the perfect gift for an old friend.
107	"Perfect Pitch (Valentine's Day Special)"	5 February 2021
Chloe gets an earful when both Cat and Jazz try to serenade her!
108	"Technical Hitch"	23 April 2021
When Simon has an important skype meeting, his cat seems determined to intervene.
109	"House Guest (Pupsitting: Part 1/3)"	21 May 2021
Simon agrees to take care of a friend's puppy, and his cat is less than thrilled.
110	"Hounded (Pupsitting: Part 2/3)"	25 June 2021
Simon's Cat tries to cope as the puppy messes up every aspect of his life.
111	"Purrfect Storm (Pupsitting: Part 3/3)"	30 July 2021
Simon's Cat finally starts getting used to the puppy, just in time to say goodbye.
112	"The Monster Returns (Halloween Special)"	22 October 2021
Cat and the Kitten work together to defeat the Monster that lives in the closet!
113	"Bugged"	19 November 2021
Cat tries to play with a ladybug, only for the ladybug to turn the tables and start playing with him!
114	"Light Lunch (Christmas Special)"	10 December 2021
Cat is determined to try some of Simon's lunch.
115	"Cast Adrift"	25 February 2022
Snow is not a cat's best friend.
116	"Royal Gift"	2 June 2022
Chloe's nap is interrupted by several uninvited guests at the door.
117	"The Shadow (Teddy's Tale Part 1)"	7 July 2022
When Cat notices Teddy following him, he decides to show him a trick or two on how to get food.
118	"Tricks of the Trade (Teddy's Tale Part 2)"	4 August 2022
Cat tries to find a home for Teddy.
119	"Homeward Bound (Teddy's Tale Part 3)"	8 September 2022
When Teddy goes missing, Cat searches the whole neighborhood to find him.
120	"Spa Day"	10 November 2022
All Cat wants is a drink of water, but he gets more than he bargained for.
121	"Tree Trouble (Christmas Special)"	15 December 2022
Simon's new Christmas tree is not as cat and kitten proof as he'd hoped for.
122	"Love is in the Air (A Valentine's Special!)"	2 February 2023
Cat and the Kitten both learn the hard way that felines and dandelions don't mix.
123	"Luck of the Drawer"	13 April 2023
Cat wants a nap IN the drawer. Simon wants Cat OUT of the drawer.
124	"The Trip (Cat Sitting Part 1)"	11 May 2023
Simon goes on a camping trip, leaving his sister to look after Cat and Kitten. Neither are thrilled. First appearance of Simon's Sister.
125	"Packed Lunch (Cat Sitting Part 2)"	22 June 2023
Simon has troubles on his camping trip, while his sister has troubles looking after Cat and Kitten.
126	"Home Sweet Home (Cat Sitting Part 3)"	3 August 2023
While Simon learns the great outdoors are not for him, it turns out as much as she likes them, Simon's sister is allergic to the Cat and Kitten.
127	"Haunted House (Halloween Special)"	5 October 2023
Cat thinks the Kitten is trying to mess with him, but is it someone . . . or something . . . else?
128	"Oh Deer! (A Christmas Special)"	14 December 2023
While Simon tries to wrap presents, Cat takes an interest in one particular toy.
129	"4 A.M. Zoomies"	7 March 2024
At 4:00 in the morning, Simon tries to sleep, but Cat and Kitten want to play.
130	"Kitten Surprise (The Kitten Origins Part 1)"	16 May 2024
A flashback episode showing how Cat and Kitten first met.
131	"Finders Keepers (The Kitten Origins Part 2)"	13 June 2024
In the continuing flashback, Cat shows Kitten how to be a house pet.
132	"Forever Ever (The Kitten Origins Part 3)"	11 July 2024
Cat tries to find the missing Kitten, only for Simon to find him in the most painful way possible!
133	"Nightmare at the Vets (Halloween Special)"	3 October 2024
A Vet has a nightmarish encounter with the worst patient ever.
134	"The Heist (Thanksgiving Special)"	7 November 2024
No turkey is safe from Cat and the Kitten!
135	"Wreck the Halls (A Christmas Special)"	12 December 2024
Through trial and error, Simon gets Cat what he REALLY wants for Christmas.
136	"Food Fight"	7 February 2025
Both Cat and the birds he's hunting give as good as they get.
137	"Hangry Cat"	6 March 2025
Simon wants to finish his model ship building, but Cat wants to be fed.
138	"Tail Break (Back to the Vet Part 1)"	1 May 2025
Simon takes Cat to the vet after an accident causes his tail to break.
139	"Fight and Flight (Back to the Vet Part 2)"	5 June 2025
Cat tries to escape the vet's office.
140	"Party Animals (Back to the Vet Part 3)"	3 July 2025
Cat returns home after an all-night party with the other animals at the vet.
141	"Face Plant - Catnip Chaos"	16 October 2025
Cat finds his zen place courtesy of a wild catnip plant.
142	"Secret Santa (Christmas special)"	4 December 2025
Teddy delivers some Christmas presents to Cat and Kitten.
143	"Pain in the Glass"	5 February 2026
Cat uses a mirror to play a trick on Kitten.
144	"Wet Cat"	30 April 2026
Cat causes trouble for Simon after coming inside from the rain.
145	"Flying the Nest (Kitten Quest: Part 1)"	28 May 2026
When the squeaky toy bird goes missing in the woods, Kitten ventures out to find it.
146	"Mission Impawsible (Kitten Quest: Part 2)"	2 July 2026
Kitten continues searching for his missing toy.
147	"Belly of the Beast (Kitten Quest: Part 3)"	23 July 2026
Kitten finds his missing toy, but the adventure is not over yet.
148	"Tale's End (Kitten Quest: Part 4)"	20 August 2026
Kitten brings his missing toy home.
149	"Prints of Darkness (Halloween special)"	8 October 2026
Cat takes a disliking to a printer.
150	"Nature Calls"	5 November 2026

=== Off to the Vet and Colour Episodes ===
In the summer of 2015, a crowdfunding campaign was launched to raise funds to allow Simon and his team to make a 13-minute colour episode of Simon's Cat. Everybody who contributed at least £5 was offered free access to the clip and other perks. The campaign was successful and the clip was released to supporters in August 2015. In January 2017, the clip went on sale (unlike the other episodes, Off to the Vet previously was not offered for free viewing). It was released for free viewing on 26 October 2017. It was then re-released in black & white on 26 April 2018 at the request of fans who were curious to see what the film would be like in the series' signature black & white style.

No.	Title (Simon's Cat in...)	Original YouTube airdate
1	"Off to the Vet (4 parts)"	27 October 2017
After a minor accident, Simon takes his cat to the vet. It goes as well as one would expect.
2	"MISSING CAT (3 parts)"	26 September 2019
Angry with Simon, Cat runs away!
3	"Cat Fight (3 parts)"	19 March 2020
Cat has a territorial rivalry with the neighboring Persian, Jazz.
4	"The Origins Story (3 parts)"	25 September 2020
How Simon and his cat first met.
5	"Love Story"	12 March 2021
Cat never stops trying to impress Chloe. Comprises the episodes "Smitten", "Butterflies", "Perfect Pitch", "Blind Date", and "Head Over Heels".
6	"Pupsitting (3 parts)"	21 September 2021
Simon babysits a puppy. Cat is less than thrilled.
7	"Crazy Kitten"	21 April 2022
Antics of the Kitten. Comprises the episodes "Double Trouble", "Catnap", "Icecapade", "Screen Grab", "Suitcase", "Pawtrait", "April Showers", and part 3 of "Cat Fight".
8	"Creepy Capers"	6 October 2022
Simon's Cat celebrates Halloween. Comprises the episodes "The Monster", "Batcat", "Scary Stories", "Scary Legs", "Monster Returns", "Scaredy Cat", and "Spooked.
9	"Teddy's Tale (3 parts)"	22 November 2022
Cat tries to help his new friend Teddy find food and a forever home.
10	"Cat Sitting (3 parts)"	14 September 2023
Simon goes on vacation, leaving Cat and Kitten in the care of his sister.
11	"CAT OLYMPICS"	1 August 2024
Cat and Kitten have their own Olympics. Comprises an original beginning, the Beyond the Fence TV Advert, and the episodes Hop it!, Ready Steady Slow!, Fetch, part of The Shadow, Polished Paws, Kitten vs. Snake, and 4am Zoomies.
12	"Cozy Christmas"	5 December 2024
Simon's Cat Celebrates Christmas. Comprises the episodes Santa Claws, Sticky Tape, Little Angel, Oh Deer!, Light Lunch, and Catnip
13	"LIFE IS BETTER WITH CATS"	3 April 2025
Comprises the episodes Luck of the Drawer, Bed Sheets, Cat and Mouse, Spa Day, The Snip, and Laser Toy.

=== Simon's Cat Logic ===
A series of animated cartoons with embedded live footage that explains cats' traits and behaviour and what can be done to keep them happy and healthy. It is introduced and narrated by Simon Tofield (animated intro, live throughout the episode) and features cat behaviourist Nicky Trevorrow (live). Each episode is illustrated with animations of cats and excerpts from Simon's Cat episodes as well as Behind the Scenes footage.

No.	Title (Simon's Cat Logic)	Original YouTube airdate
1	"Why Do Cats Have A 'Crazy Time'?"	28 January 2016
Why do cats run wildly around the house, jump on and off furniture, etc.
2	"Do Cats Fall in Love?"	12 February 2016
Do cats form lifelong relationships?
3	"In or Out? Why Are Cats So Indecisive?!"	21 April 2016
Why do cats seemingly hate closed doors but lose interest once the door is opened?
4	"Why Do Cats Love Boxes?!"	19 May 2016
Why do cats love to get into empty boxes and other small spaces?
5	"Why Do Cats Sleep in Unusual Places?!"	16 June 2016
What draws cats to sleep in various odd places and do cats have dreams?
6	"How Do Cats Stay So Clean!?"	21 July 2016
Ways cats keep themselves clean.
7	"Things You Didn't Know About Feeding Time!"	18 August 2016
How to make the feeding of a cat easier for her human companion and more attractive for the cat.
8	"Things You Didn't Know About Ragdolls!"	16 September 2016
All about ragdolls.
9	"Why Do Cats Like Hunting?"	20 December 2016
How much wild cats have to hunt to stay alive, why even domestic, well-fed cats hunt.
10	"Do Cats Really Hate Water?"	10 March 2017
Do cats really stay away from water? Also recommendations on the shape and placement of cat's water bowl.
11	"Is Your Cat Talking To you?"	16 June 2017
Find out how cats communicate using body language.
12	"Learn To Speak Cat"	28 July 2017
Do people wonder what cats are trying to say when they meow?
13	"How can I entertain my cat?"	22 September 2017
This logic episode has information about how cats play, and good ways for owners to play with their cats.
14	"Are Black Cats Unlucky?"	27 October 2017
Simon introduces his new kitten Poppy; and Nicky dispels myths about black cats being unlucky.
15	"What do cats want for Christmas?"	24 November 2017
This episode presents seasonal safety tips for cats, and what to get your cat(s) for Christmas.
16	"Why do cats go crazy for Catnip?"	22 December 2017
Ever wondered why many cats go crazy for catnip?
17	"Territorial Behaviour!"	16 February 2018
Simon and Nicki give tips on how cats defend their territories and what cat owners can do to help them stay safe and happy.
18	"When Your Cat Goes Missing"	10 June 2018
Nicky shares advice on what to do when your cat goes missing. Simon talks about the moment Teddy disappeared.
19	"Cats on the Move"	5 October 2018
Nicky and Simon give tips on how to make moving less stressful for cats and their owners.

=== Simon's Cat – Sketches ===
Simon Tofield released a new series titled Simon's Cat – Sketches. Unlike its main shorts series, these episodes are faster to make, giving it a looser look and feel, while keeping the humour and relatable comedy intact. This series features fresh gags, adventurous characters and new locations.

No.	Title (Simon's Cat Presents...)	Original YouTube airdate
1	"UFO"	5 August 2018
Simon's Cat has a close encounter with a UFO (Unidentified Fluttering Object).
2	"Primal Instinct"	9 September 2018
Simon's Cat draws on his primal instinct to go hunting.
3	"Windy Day"	23 November 2018
Simon's Cat braces himself for a windy day.

== Awards ==
Date	Award	Episode	Category
March 2008	British Animation Awards	"Cat Man Do"	Best Comedy
2008	Festival international des Très Courts	"Cat Man Do"	Prix Animation
2008	Leicester Short Film Festival	"Cat Man Do"	Best Animation
2008	Bradford Animation Festival	"Cat Man Do"	Special Jury Prize
September 2008	Animae Caribe	"Let Me In"	Most Outstanding Animation

Also, Simon's Cat: Pop Time, a video game for iOS, Android and Amazon Kindle, was nominated for "Best Casual Game" and "Best Puzzle Game" at The Independent Game Developers' Association Awards 2018; another game for iOS and Android, Simon's Cat Dash, was nominated for the "Heritage" award.

== Bibliography ==
All books authored by Simon Tofield.

- Simon's Cat (2009) ISBN 978-1-84767-481-4
- Simon's Cat: Beyond the Fence (2010) ISBN 978-1-84767-484-5
- Simon's Cat in Kitten Chaos (2011) ISBN 978-0-85786-078-1
- Simon's Cat: Feed Me! (2012) ISBN 978-0-85786-277-8
- Simon's Cat vs. The World! (2012) ISBN 978-0-85786-080-4
- Simon's Cat: Wake Up! (2013) ISBN 978-0-85786-773-5
- Simon's Cat: Play Time! (2013) ISBN 978-0-85786-771-1
- The Bumper Book of Simon's Cat (2013) ISBN 978-0-85786-079-8
- Off to the Vet... and Other Cat-astrophes (2015) ISBN 978-1-78211-587-8
- Simon's Cat: It's A Dog's Life (2019) ISBN 978-1-78689-700-8
