= Marco Bassetti =

Italian manager and entrepreneur

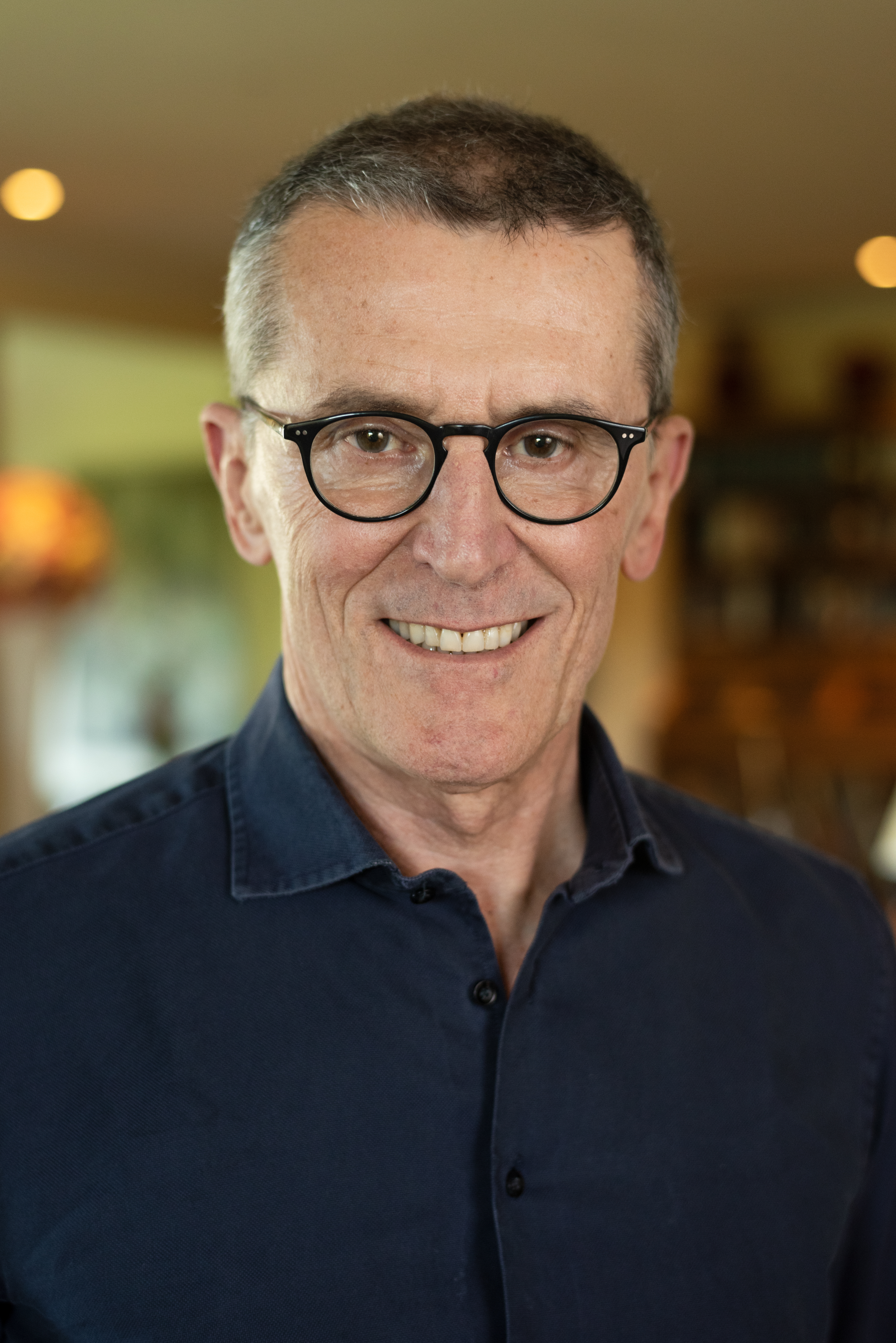
- Born: July 10, 1957 (age 68); Varese, Italy

Marco Bassetti (born July 10, 1957 in Varese, Italy) is an Italian manager and entrepreneur.

In the early 1980s, he started working as executive producer for Mondadori's Retequattro, later moving to Mediaset. In 1986, he founded his own production company La Italiana Produzioni, producing light entertainment, game shows, talk shows and commercials. In 1989, he founded Aran, which soon became a leading Italian production company; supplying all major Italian networks with series, sit-coms, soap operas, light entertainment programs and TV movies.

From 1994 to 1997, he was also chief executive officer of the joint venture with Grundy Italy, which later became Pearson TV Italy. In December 1997, he founded the company Endemol Italy and worked as Managing Director and then President of Endemol Italy until May 2004 when he stepped down in order to dedicate more time to several entrepreneurial activities in Italy and abroad. He remains a member of Endemol's International Board.

In October 2007, he returned to Endemol Group as Chief Operating Officer and in August 2009 he was appointed President of the Endemol Group. When the company decided to restructure the debt, he took over the responsibility of CEO of the Group. After a successful turnaround in April 2012, he stepped down. He founded a new company, Ambra Multimedia, in November 2012.

In April 2013 he joined Banijay Entertainment as Chief Executive Officer.

== Links ==
- Official website
