= Eva Longoria filmography =

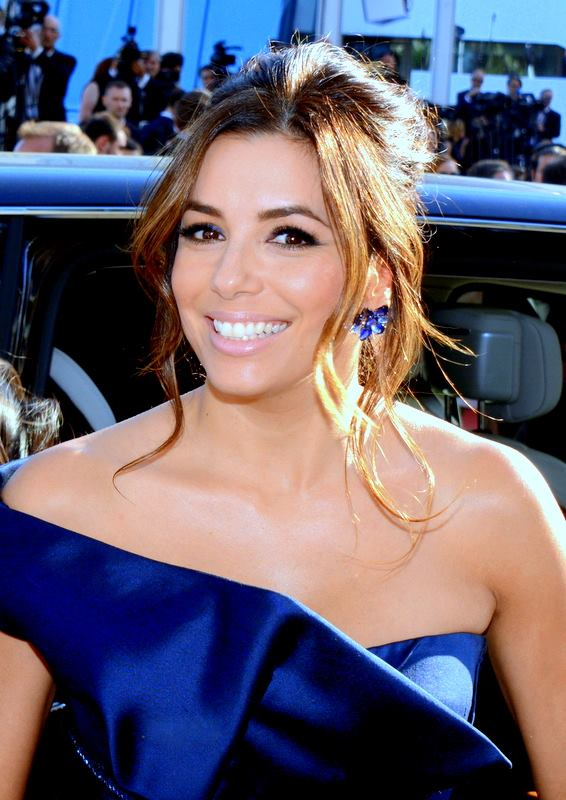
Longoria at the 2015 Cannes Film Festival

The following is the complete filmography of American actress, producer, director and business woman Eva Longoria.

== Film ==
Year	Title	Role	Notes	Ref.
2003	Snitch'd	Gabby		
2004	Señorita Justice	Detective Roselyn Martinez		
2004	Carlita's Secret	Carlita / Lexus		
2005	Harsh Times	Sylvia		
2006	The Sentinel	Jill Marin		
2007	The Heartbreak Kid	Consuela Cantrow		
2008	Over Her Dead Body	Kate Spencer		
2008	Lower Learning	Rebecca Seabrook		
2010	Morning Glory	Herself	Uncredited cameo	
2011	Without Men	Rosalba Viuda de Patiño		
2011	Arthur Christmas	Chief De Silva	Voice role	
2012	For Greater Glory	Tulita Gorostieta		
2012	Foodfight!	Lady X/Priscilla	Voice role	
2012	The Baytown Outlaws	Celeste Martin		
2012	Crazy Kind of Love	Marion Hughes		
2013	A Dark Truth	Mia Francis		
2013	In a World...	Herself		
2014	Frontera	Paulina Ramirez		
2015	Any Day	Jolene		
2015	Visions	Eileen		
2016	Lowriders	Gloria Alvarez		
2016	Un Cuento de Circo & A Love Song	Angela		
2018	Overboard	Theresa		
2018	Dog Days	Grace		
2019	Dora and the Lost City of Gold	Elena Márquez		
2020	Sylvie's Love	Carmen		
2021	Rita Moreno: Just a Girl Who Decided to Go for It	Herself	Documentary	
2021	The Boss Baby: Family Business	Carol Templeton	Voice role	
2022	Unplugging	Jeanine Dewerson		
2022	Aristotle and Dante Discover the Secrets of the Universe	Soledad Quintana		
2022	Tell It Like a Woman	Ana		
2025	Alexander and the Terrible, Horrible, No Good, Very Bad Road Trip	Val Garcia		
2025	War of the Worlds	Sandra Salas		
2025	The Pickup	Natalie Pierce		
2025	Christmas Karma	the Ghost of Christmas Past		
2025	Oh. What. Fun.	Zazzy Tims		
2026	The Last Sunrise	Isolde Pera		
2026	Call My Agent! The Movie	Herself		
TBA	All-Star Weekend †	Asia	Completed	

Key
†	Denotes films that have not yet been released

== Television ==
Year	Title	Role	Notes	Ref.
2000	Beverly Hills, 90210	Flight Attendant #3	Episode: "I Will Be Your Father Figure"	
2000	General Hospital	Brenda Barrett Lookalike	1 episode	
2001–2003	The Young and the Restless	Isabella Braña	Regular role	
2003–2004	Dragnet	Detective Gloria Duran	Main role (renamed L.A. Dragnet for season 2)	
2004	The Dead Will Tell	Jeanie	Television film	
2004–2012	Desperate Housewives	Gabrielle Solis	Main role	
2005	Saturday Night Live	Herself	Host, episode: "Eva Longoria/Korn"	
2006	George Lopez	Brooke	Episode: "George Vows to Make Some Matri-Money"	
2008	Childrens Hospital	The New Chief	Episode 1.10	
2009	Fort Boyard	Herself	Contestant in Episode 1 of Season 20	
2010	MTV Europe Music Awards 2010	Herself	Host, TV special	
2013	MasterChef	Herself	Episode: Top 11 Compete	
2013	Welcome to the Family	Ana Nunez	Episode: "The Big RV Adventure"	
2013	The Simpsons	Isabel Gutierrez	Voice role, episode: "The Kid Is All Right"	
2013–2014	Mother Up!	Rudi Wilson	Main voice role	
2014–2015	Brooklyn Nine-Nine	Sophia Perez	4 episodes (season 2)	
2015–2016	Telenovela	Ana Sofia Calderón	Main role	
2015–2016	Versus	N/A	Short films, as producer, director	
2016	Lip Sync Battle	Herself	2 episodes	
2016	Devious Maids	Herself	Episode: "Once More Unto the Bleach"	
2016	Maya & Marty	Various	Episode: "John Cena, Nick Jonas, Eva Longoria and Ben Stiller"	
2017	Decline and Fall	Margot Beste-Chetwynde	Miniseries	
2017	Empire	Charlotte Frost	3 episodes	
2018	Jane the Virgin	Herself	Episode: "Chapter Seventy-Five"	
2018	BoJack Horseman	Yolanda's Mother	Voice role, episode: "Planned Obsolescence"	
2019	Grand Hotel	Beatriz Mendoza	3 episodes	
2020	Flipped	Fidelia	2 episodes	
2020	Game On: A Comedy Crossover Event	Gia	1 episode	
2022	The Proud Family: Louder and Prouder	Melrose Avanúñez	Voice role, episode: "Raging Bully"	
2023	Eva Longoria: Searching for Mexico	Host	6 episodes	
2024	Land of Women	Gala	Also executive producer	
2024	Only Murders in the Building	Herself portraying Mabel	Recurring role (Season 4)	
2025	Eva Longoria: Searching for Spain	Host	8 episodes	
2025	Necaxa	Herself	10 episodes, also executive producer	
2026–present	Eva Longoria: Searching for France	Host	8 episodes	

== Producer ==
Year	Title	Notes	Ref.
2010	The Harvest	Executive producer	
2013	Ready for Love	Executive producer	
2013–2014	Mother Up	Executive producer	
2013–2016	Devious Maids	Executive producer and director	
2014	John Wick	Producer	
2014	Food Chains	Executive producer	
2015	Go, Sebastien, Go!	Producer and director	
2015–2016	Telenovela	Executive producer	
2019	Grand Hotel	Executive producer	
TBA	Call My Agent!	Producer, Spanish language	

== Director ==
Year	Title	Notes	Ref.
2014	Devious Maids	Episode: "Sprinkles"	
2016	Jane the Virgin	Episode: "Chapter Forty-Seven"	
2016	Telenovela	Episode: "The Hurricane"	
2017–2019	Black-ish	3 episodes	
2017–2019	The Mick	2 episodes	
2018	LA to Vegas	Episode: "#PilotFight"	
2019	Grand Hotel	2 episodes	
2020	The Expanding Universe of Ashley Garcia	Episode: "No Scientific Basis Whatsoever"	
2021	Why Women Kill	Episode: "Scene of the Crime"	
2023	Flamin' Hot	Feature directorial debut	
TBA	Call My Agent!	First and second episode, Spanish language	
TBA	The Fifth Wheel	Feature film	

== Music videos ==
Year	Title	Artist	Ref.
1999	"Shake Your Bon-Bon"	Ricky Martin	
2005	"Unpredictable"	Jamie Foxx	
2006	"A Public Affair"	Jessica Simpson	
2007	"Balance-toi"	Tony Parker	
2009	"Desde cuando"	Alejandro Sanz	
2011	"I Like How It Feels"	Enrique Iglesias	
