= George Dewey (film producer) =

American film producer

- Occupations: Creative executive Film producer
- Relatives: Thomas E. Dewey (grandfather)

George Dewey is an American creative executive, film producer and entrepreneur. He is best known as the co-founder and president of Maximum Effort, a production and marketing company founded with actor Ryan Reynolds.

Dewey has worked on film, television, and marketing projects including Deadpool, John Candy: I Like Me, Free Guy, Spirited, Aviation Gin, Mint Mobile and Welcome to Wrexham. He also serves on the board of directors of Wrexham A.F.C.

== Early life ==
Dewey is the grandson of politician Thomas E. Dewey, who served as governor of New York from 1943 to 1954.

== Career ==
Dewey began his advertising career as an intern at McCann Erickson in 1995. He later became executive creative director at the agency's New York office, where he worked on accounts including Verizon Wireless, the United States Army, Avis, Black & Decker, and the United Nations.

He later joined 20th Century Fox, where he served as senior vice president of digital marketing. During his time at Fox, Dewey worked on marketing campaigns for films including Deadpool, The Martian, Kingsman: The Golden Circle, and Gone Girl. Dewey subsequently became president of digital at Annapurna Pictures before joining Ryan Reynolds' production company, Maximum Effort Productions, in 2018 as president.

=== Maximum Effort ===
Dewey co-founded Maximum Effort with Ryan Reynolds in 2018. The company operates in film production, television, and marketing. Maximum Effort gained attention for its "fastvertising" approach to advertising and branded content, particularly through campaigns connected to Deadpool, Aviation Gin, Peloton, and Mint Mobile.

In 2021, the marketing division of Maximum Effort was sold to the advertising platform MNTN, while Reynolds continued serving as chief creative officer for the company.

In 2025, Reynolds and Dewey reached an agreement to reunite the marketing and production divisions of Maximum Effort as an independent entity.

=== Wrexham A.F.C. ===
Dewey has been involved in the marketing and media operations of Wrexham A.F.C., the Welsh football club owned by Ryan Reynolds and Rob McElhenney. He served as executive producer of the documentary series Welcome to Wrexham. In April 2025, Dewey was appointed to the board of directors of Wrexham A.F.C. Limited following approval by the English Football League (EFL).

== Filmography ==
=== Film ===
Year	Title	Credit	Notes
2019	Truce	Writer	Short film
2019	Becoming Pikachu	Writer	Short film
2020	Match Made in Hell	Writer	Short film
2021	Meet Bryan Breynolds	Executive producer	Short film
2021	Free Guy	Executive producer	
2022	The Adam Project	Executive producer	
2022	Spirited	Producer	
2022	Shotgun Wedding	Executive producer	
2024	IF	Executive producer	
2024	Deadpool & Wolverine	Executive producer	
2025	John Candy: I Like Me	Producer	
2026	Mayday	Executive producer	
2026	Man in Motion: The Rick Hansen story	Executive producer	Documentary film

=== Television ===
Year	Title	Credit	Notes
2021	Ryan Doesn't Know	Executive producer	
2022–2025	Welcome to Wrexham	Executive producer; writer	22 episodes; wrote 1 episode
2023	Discontinued	Executive producer	10 episodes
2024	The House From...	Executive producer	
2025	Underdogs	Executive producer	Miniseries; 5 episodes
2025	Necaxa	Executive producer	10 episodes

== Awards and nominations ==
Year	Award	Category	Work	Result	Ref.
2022	Hollywood Music in Media Awards	Best Music Themed Film, Biopic or Musical	Spirited	Nominated	
2023	Primetime Emmy Awards	Outstanding Unstructured Reality Program	Welcome to Wrexham	Won	
2024	Primetime Emmy Awards	Outstanding Unstructured Reality Program	Welcome to Wrexham	Won	
2024	Producers Guild of America Awards	Outstanding Producer of Non-Fiction Television	Welcome to Wrexham	Won	
2025	Primetime Emmy Awards	Outstanding Unstructured Reality Program	Welcome to Wrexham	Nominated	
2026	Producers Guild of America Awards	Outstanding Producer of Televised or Streamed Motion Pictures	John Candy: I Like Me	Won	
