= John Andretti =

American race car driver (1963–2020)

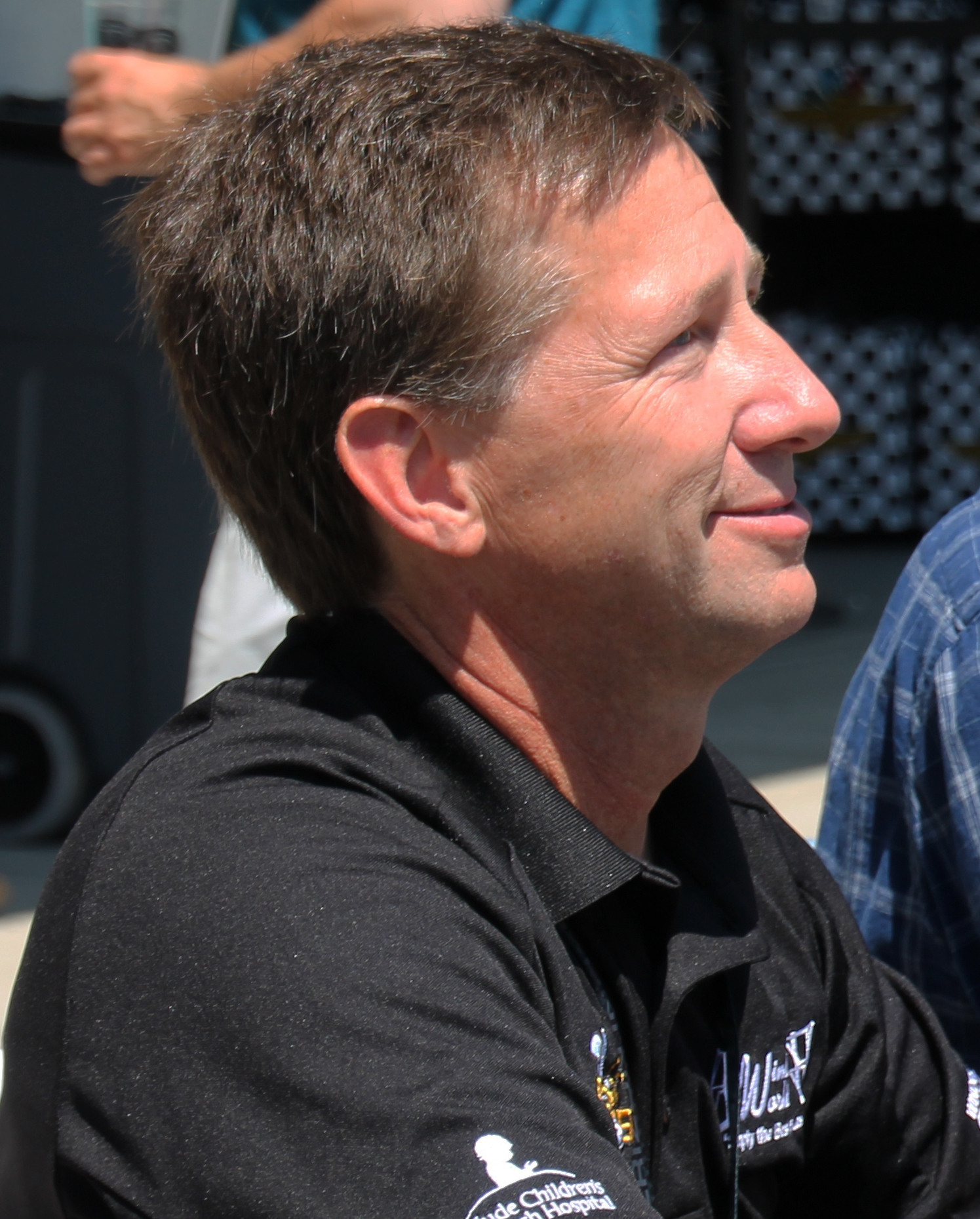
- Andretti at Indianapolis Motor Speedway prior to the 2015 Indianapolis 500
- Born: John Andrew Andretti; March 12, 1963; Bethlehem, Pennsylvania, U.S.
- Died: January 30, 2020 (aged 56); Mooresville, North Carolina, U.S.
- Cause of death: Colorectal cancer
- Achievements: First driver to compete in the Indianapolis-Charlotte double

NASCAR Cup Series career
- 393 races run over 17 years
- Best finish: 11th (1998)
- First race: 1993 Tyson/Holly Farms 400 (North Wilkesboro)
- Last race: 2010 Daytona 500 (Daytona)
- First win: 1997 Pepsi 400 (Daytona)
- Last win: 1999 Goody's Body Pain 500 (Martinsville)
Wins	Top tens	Poles
2	37	4

NASCAR O'Reilly Auto Parts Series career
- 37 races run over 3 years
- Best finish: 12th (2006)
- First race: 1998 Goody's 300 (Daytona)
- Last race: 2007 Orbitz 300 (Daytona)
Wins	Top tens	Poles
0	4	0

NASCAR FedEx Freight Truck Series career
- 6 races run over 2 years
- Best finish: 46th (2005)
- First race: 2005 O'Reilly Auto Parts 250 (Kansas)
- Last race: 2008 Mountain Dew 250 Fueled by Winn-Dixie (Talladega)
Wins	Top tens	Poles
0	3	0

IndyCar Series career
- 10 races run over 5 years
- 2011 position: 42nd
- Best finish: 30th (2008)
- First race: 2007 Indianapolis 500 (Indy)
- Last race: 2011 Indianapolis 500 (Indy)
Wins	Podiums	Poles
0	0	0

Champ Car career
- 73 races run over 8 years
- Years active: 1987–1994
- Best finish: 8th (1991, 1992)
- First race: 1987 Road America 200 (Elkhart Lake)
- Last race: 1994 Indianapolis 500 (Indy)
- First win: 1991 Gold Coast Indy Car Grand Prix (Surfers Paradise)
Wins	Podiums	Poles
1	2	0
- Statistics up to date as of May 26, 2012.

John Andrew Andretti (March 12, 1963 – January 30, 2020) was an American professional race car driver. He won individual races in CART, IMSA GTP, Rolex Sports Car Series, and NASCAR during his career. A member of the Andretti racing family, he was the son of Aldo Andretti, older brother of racer Adam Andretti, nephew of Mario Andretti, and the cousin to CART drivers Michael and Jeff Andretti. He was also the first cousin once-removed of Marco Andretti.

== Early life and education ==
Andretti was born on March 12, 1963, in Bethlehem, Pennsylvania, to "Corky" and Aldo Andretti. As a member of the Andretti racing family, he was encouraged and supported by his family during his racing career. Starting with kart racing at a young age, he later graduated to junior stock car racing and USAC-sponsored midget car racing.

Andretti attended Moravian College in Bethlehem, where he graduated in 1985 with a degree in business management. He later reflected that he likely would have been an investment banker or stock broker if he had not started racing.

== Career ==
=== 20th century ===
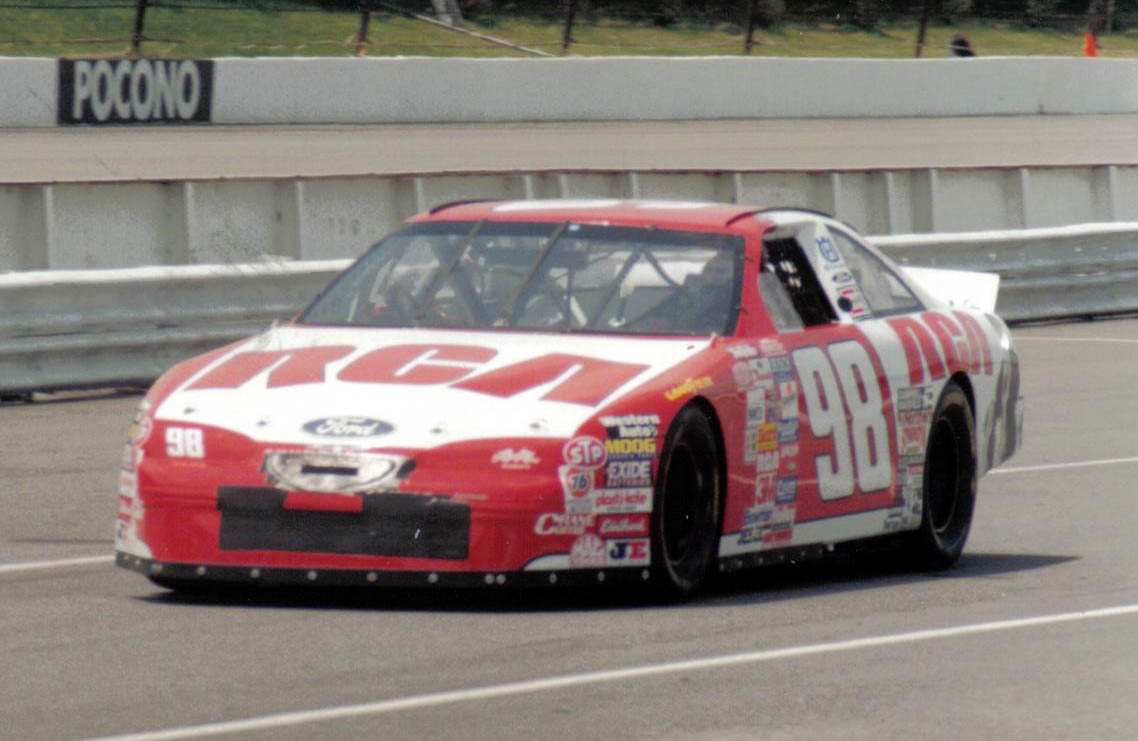
Andretti's 1997 race car at Pocono Raceway

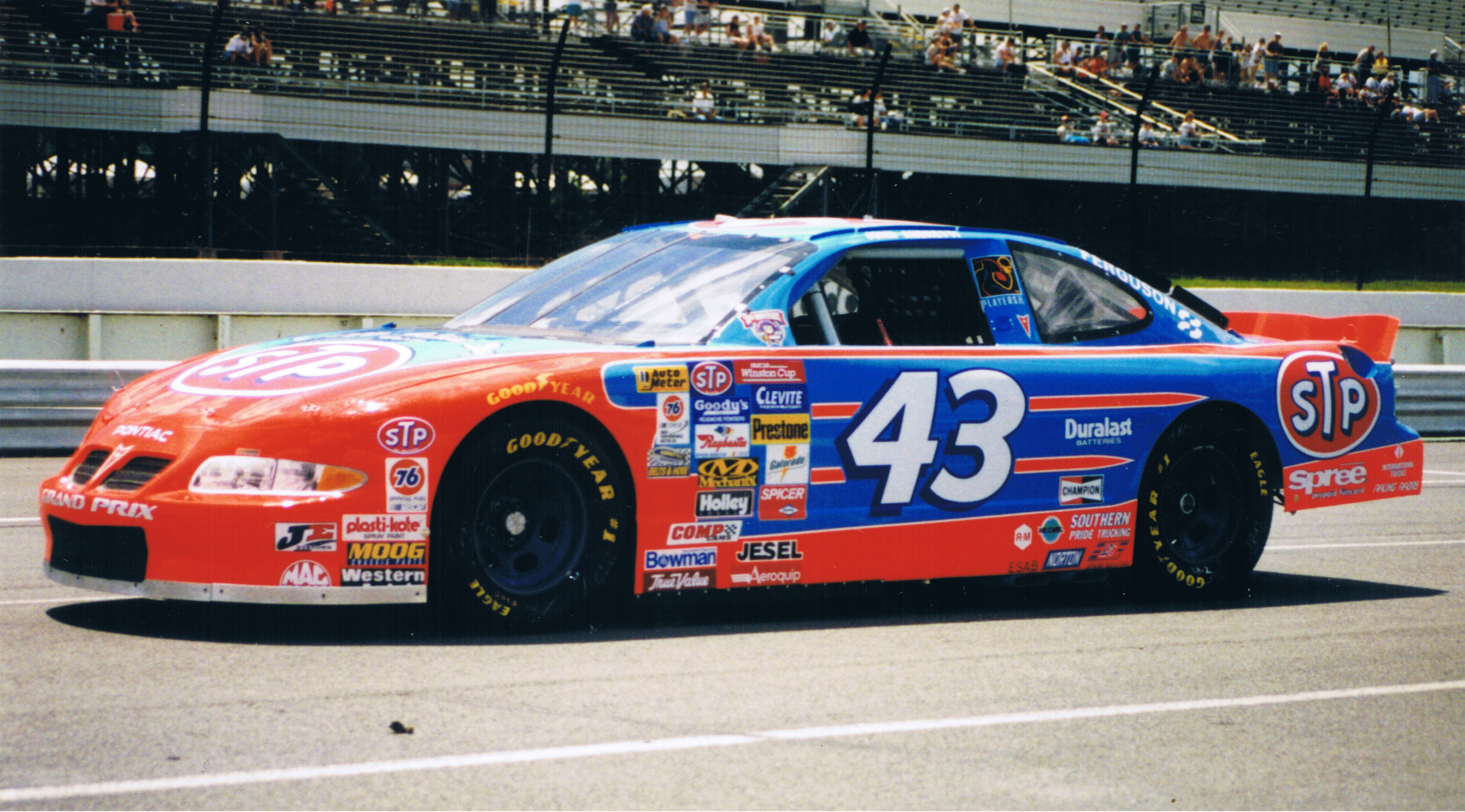
Andretti in the Petty Enterprise No. 43 Pontiac at Pocono Raceway in June 1998

In 1986, Andretti joined the BMW North America team for the 1986 IMSA GTP season. Paired with Davy Jones, he won that year's Watkins Glen International race.

The following year, in 1987, Andretti joined CART's PPG Indy Car World Series. In his debut at the Indianapolis Motor Speedway in the 1988 Indianapolis 500, he reached as high as seventh place in the race before falling to 21st place following mechanical problems.

In 1989, Andretti drove the Miller High Life/BF Goodrich Porsche 962 to victory in the 24 Hours of Daytona, then called the Sunbank 24 at Daytona, along with co-drivers Bob Wollek and Derek Bell. Later in the 1989 IMSA season, Andretti and Wollek won the Pontiac Grand Prix of Palm Beach, driving the same Porsche 962. Andretti finished fifth in points (112) in the 1989 IMSA season, first among Porsche drivers.

In 1991, Andretti won the only race of his CART career, the Gold Coast Indy 300 in Surfers Paradise, Australia. He finished a career-best fifth in the 1991 Indianapolis 500. The 1994 Indianapolis 500 was his last Indianapolis 500 appearance until his return in 2007.

In 1993, Andretti drove the Taco Bell Express Top Fuel Dragster, reaching the semi-finals in his first national event at Atlanta during the FRAM Southern Nationals, clocking a career-best speed of 299 mph (481 km/h). In that race, he beat 1992 T/F Champion Joe Amato in Round 1 and Mopar Express Lube driver Tommy Johnson Jr. in Round 2, but lost to Mike Dunn in Darrell Gwynn's La Victoria Salsa Car in the semi-finals.

Andretti made his Winston Cup debut in 1993, driving the No. 72 Tex Racing Chevy for Tex Powell at North Wilkesboro Speedway, where he started 31st and finished 24th. After running three more races in 1993, he began the 1994 season driving the No. 14 Financial World-sponsored Chevy for Billy Hagan. On May 29, he became the first driver in history to race in both the Indianapolis 500 and the Coca-Cola 600 on the same day. He finished tenth at Indy and 36th in the Coca-Cola 600 after suffering mechanical failures. In the middle of the season, he switched to the No. 43 STP-sponsored Pontiac for Petty Enterprises. His best finish was eleventh place, at Richmond Raceway. He ended the season thirty-second in points and fifth in the Rookie of the Year battle.

In 1995, Andretti began driving for Michael Kranefuss in the No. 37 Kmart/Little Caesars-sponsored Ford Thunderbird. He won his first career pole at the Southern 500 and finished in the top-ten five times. He ended the season 18th in points. During the 1996 season, he switched to the No. 98 RCA-sponsored Ford owned by Cale Yarborough after Jeremy Mayfield, the previous driver of the No. 98 car, moved to Kranefuss' team. He placed fifth at the Hanes 500. In 1997, he scored his first career win at the Pepsi 400 and finished 23rd in points. He returned to the No. 43 Petty car in 1998. Although he did not win any races in 1998, he registered ten top-ten finishes and placed a career-best eleventh in points. He won his second career race in 1999 at Martinsville Speedway, where he made up a lost lap and took the lead with four laps to go. He also won the pole at Phoenix Raceway.

=== 21st century ===
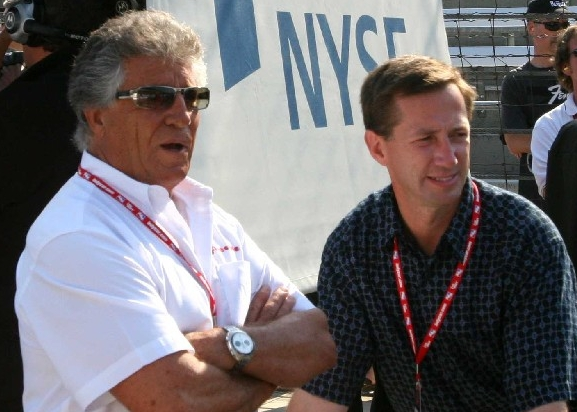
Andretti with uncle Mario at the 2007 Indianapolis 500

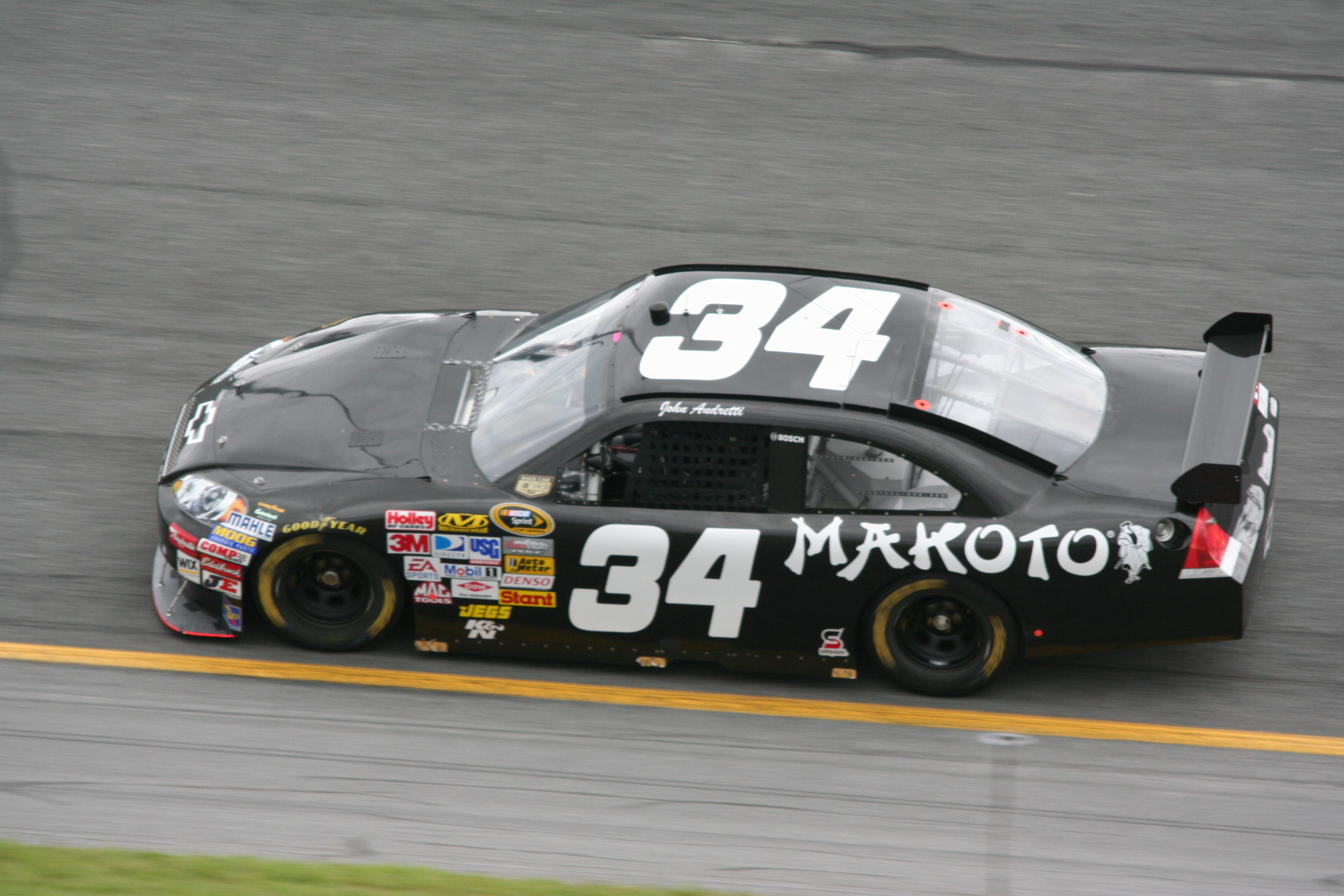
Andretti's Sprint Cup car at the 2008 Daytona 500

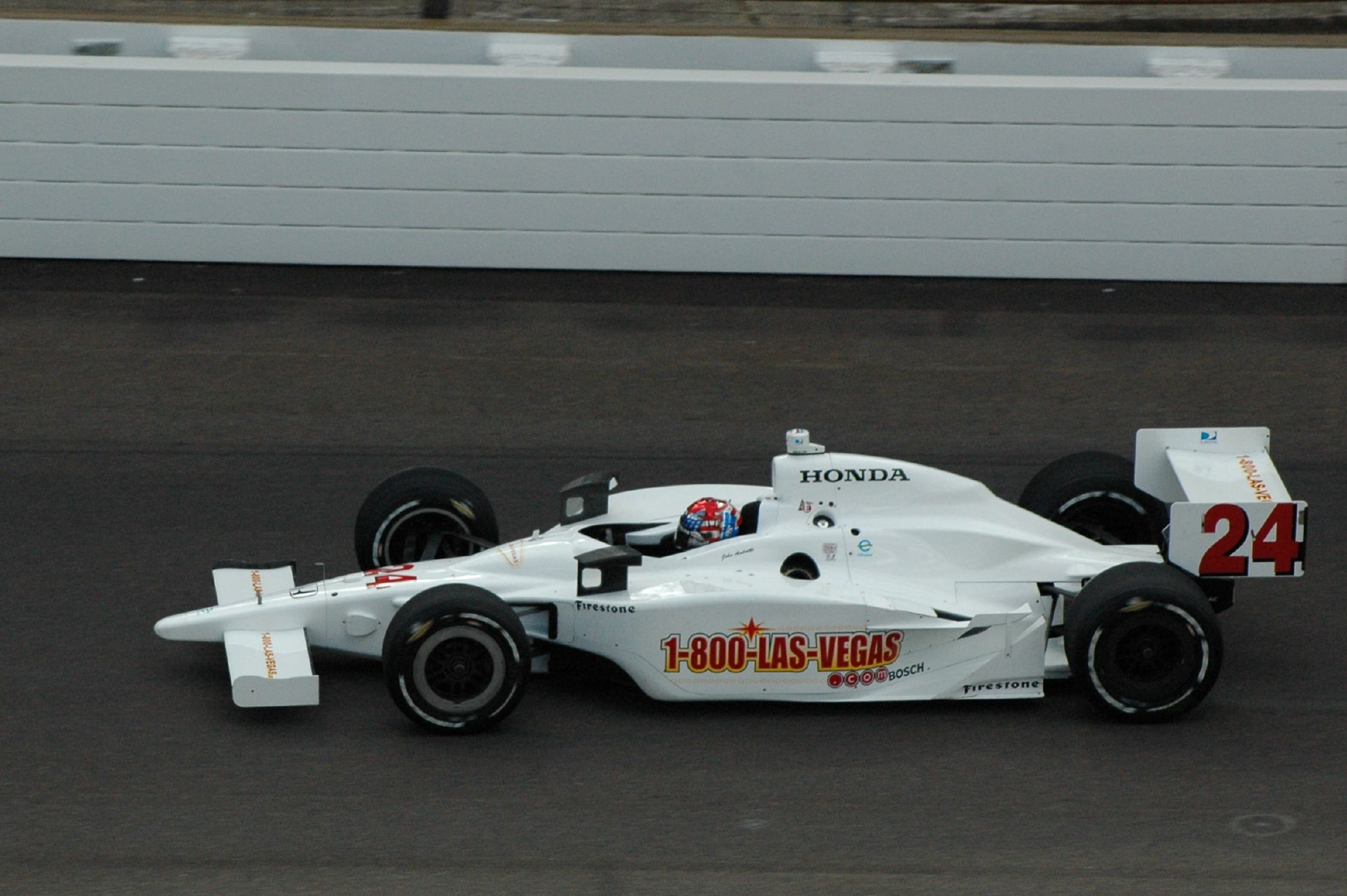
Andretti driving the Roth Racing No. 24 car in practice for the 2008 Indianapolis 500

Midway through the 2000 season, Cheerios became Andretti's primary sponsor. This was the precursor to Petty Enterprises' switch to Dodge as their manufacturer, and with the team pulling double duty trying to keep the Pontiacs they were currently racing and prepare the Dodges that were coming in, things began to fall apart for the organization. He fell to twenty-third in points after finishing in the top ten twice. Over the next two seasons, Andretti posted three top ten finishes including a notable second at Bristol where he finished second to Elliott Sadler (this was the last 1-2 finish for Petty Enterprises and Wood Brothers Racing), before he was released midway through the 2003 season. He ran a couple of races for Haas CNC Racing and Richard Childress Racing before finishing the season in the No. 1 Pennzoil-sponsored Chevy for Dale Earnhardt, Inc. His best finish that year was eighth at California.

In 2001, Andretti teamed up with Kyle Petty to win the GT Class in the six-hour sports car race at Watkins Glen.

Andretti started the 2004 season driving the No. 1 part-time for DEI, but departed midway through the season. He ended the year driving the No. 14 Victory Brand-sponsored Ford Taurus for ppc Racing and finished twenty-second at Charlotte Motor Speedway. Andretti started 2005 still driving with ppc, but the team was forced to dissolve due to a lack of funding. He drove four races in the Craftsman Truck Series for Billy Ballew Motorsports, and finished eighth at Memphis Motorsports Park. He also attempted a handful of Cup races for Morgan-McClure Motorsports' No. 4 Lucas Oil-sponsored Chevrolet, finishing twenty-eighth at Michigan International Speedway, one lap down.

In 2006, Andretti returned to ppc to drive their No. 10 Busch Series car. Before the season, his only Busch start came in 1998 at Daytona, where he finished thirteenth in the No. 96 Chevy fielded by the Curb Agajanian Performance Group. Despite having made over three-hundred Cup starts with two victories, Andretti applied for and was accepted as a contender for Rookie of the Year. He finished twelfth in points, and runner-up to Danny O'Quinn for the award.

In 2007, Andretti drove the No. 10 FreedomRoads/Camping World/RVs.com-sponsored Car for Braun Racing at Daytona through their affiliation with ppc Racing. When funding for the team became questionable, Andretti left Braun Racing. The team used various drivers in 2007 in an attempt to maintain a two-car team. Andretti drove four races for Petty Enterprises in the No. 45 car, where he filled in for Kyle Petty, who was working as a broadcaster for Turner Network Television's race coverage. He also briefly drove part-time for Front Row Motorsports. He finished the season in the No. 49 Paralyzed Veterans of America-sponsored Dodge for BAM Racing.

In 2007, Andretti returned to the Indianapolis 500 for the first time since 1994 when he competed in the Indy 500 and the Coca-Cola 600 in the same day. He drove the third entry from Panther Racing, with Camping World as the sponsor. On May 19, he qualified for the 91st Indianapolis 500 with an average speed for the four lap qualifying run of 221.756 mph (356.882 km/h). He started in 24th on the eighth row, but crashed on lap 95 and finished 30th.

In 2008, Andretti replaced Jay Howard in the Roth Racing No. 24 Dallara-Honda. Andretti qualified for his ninth Indy 500 on May 17 with a four-lap average of 221.550 mph (356.550 km/h). This placed him 21st on the grid; he finished on the lead lap in 16th place. Andretti continued in the No. 24 car in the Milwaukee Mile and Texas Motor Speedway races, and on June 6 he was offered a deal that would keep him in the car the rest of the season. He did not accept.

Also in 2008, Andretti returned to 24 Hours of Daytona in the Rolex Sports Car Series. Team drivers for the Vision Racing the Porsche Crawford Prototype included Ed Carpenter, A. J. Foyt IV, and Vítor Meira. The team finished 25th, their first Porsche Crawford Prototype entry in the 24 Hours of Daytona.

Andretti drove for Front Row Motorsports in 2008, driving the No. 34 Chevrolet Impala SS in the Sprint Cup Series. He raced his way into the 2008 Daytona 500 in the second Gatorade Duel race. He drove in the first ten races of the season in the 34 before leaving to focus on his IndyCar team.

Andretti qualified seventh at the Texas Motor Speedway race, where he finished sixteenth. He began the race at Iowa Speedway with a rough 23rd position start, but steadily worked his way through the field to capture an 11th-place finish, the best for a Roth Racing machine. His final start for the team was at Richmond International Raceway the following week, where he was knocked out by a crash. Roth Racing contracted to a single car for the rest of the season and then ceased operations. Andretti finished 30th in the 2008 IndyCar points standings.

In 2009, Andretti returned full-time to the 34 in a partnership between Front Row and Earnhardt Ganassi Racing. The No. 34 was sponsored by Window World, myAutoloan.com, and Taco Bell. He did not have a full-time ride for 2010, but drove the No. 34 Front Row Motorsports entry to a 38th-place finish after an accident on lap 117 in the Daytona 500, his final NASCAR race.

In April 2009, Andretti and Richard Petty announced a joint venture with Dreyer & Reinbold Racing, whereby Andretti would return to Indianapolis to drive the No. 43 car in the 93rd Indianapolis 500. As in his previous two trips to Indianapolis, Andretti did not race the Indy/Charlotte double, and also missed the Southern 500 and the Coca-Cola 600 to prepare for the race. Andretti qualified for the race on bump day in 28th, and finished in nineteenth place, the final car on the lead lap. Andretti returned to drive the No. 34 at Front Row Motorsports immediately after the Indianapolis 500, and returned for the Dover 400 in June.

In March 2010, Andretti announced that he would join forces with Richard Petty and Window World for two events. The No. 43 returned as the entry, which was backed by Andretti Autosport, owned by John's cousin Michael. The team's first race was the RoadRunner Turbo Indy 300 at Kansas Speedway on May 1. Andretti qualified fifteenth but finished ninth, one lap down. The team also competed in the 94th Indianapolis 500 on May 30. After failing to qualify on pole day, Andretti made the race on bump day qualifying 28th for the second consecutive year. Andretti crashed out of the race on lap 65, and was credited with a 30th-place finish.

In 2011, Andretti ran in the centennial Indianapolis 500, partnered with Window World, Petty, and Andretti Autosport, where he finished 22nd.

In 2012, Andretti returned to the Rolex 24 at Daytona with Yellow Dragon Motorsports with support from long-time sponsor Window World. His co-drivers were Taylor Hacquard, Anders Krohn and his son Jarett. The team retired with engine issues during the overnight hours and finished 50th overall in what ended up being Andretti's final professional race.

=== Philanthropy and broadcasting ===
Andretti was active in the Indianapolis-area community, working with 93.1 WIBC, and Dave "The King" Wilson, and General Mills to hold the Race for Riley, benefiting James Whitcomb Riley Hospital for Children. In 2007, Andretti began co-hosting The Driver's Seat with John Kernan on Sirius Satellite Radio's NASCAR channel 90.

== Personal life ==
Andretti's son, Jarett, currently races a GT Porsche in the IMSA WeatherTech Championship with co-driver Gabby Chaves. Jarett formerly competed in the USAC National Sprint Car Championship and the GT4 America Series.

== Illness and death ==
In April 2017, Andretti disclosed that he had stage four colon cancer. His cancer battle, originally diagnosed as Stage III-A cancer, was widely publicized, with him starting a Twitter hashtag called #CheckIt4Andretti, promoting preventative colonoscopies. After months of undergoing chemotherapy, Andretti was deemed cancer-free in late 2017. However, in May 2018, the cancer reemerged, and metastasized further. He went through another round of chemotherapy for the rest of the year, which ended in January 2019. The cancer relapsed again in late March 2019.

On January 30, 2020, Andretti died of colon cancer in Mooresville, North Carolina, at age 56, eleven months before the death of his father.

After his death, #CheckIt4Andretti became a foundation to provide colonoscopies for those without health insurance.

In 2021, Andretti Motorsports announced a partnership with Jarrett and Unite Health Share Ministries for the "Steer Clear of Cancer" campaign, to raise donations for the foundation during Colon Cancer Awareness Month.

== Motorsports career results ==
=== American open–wheel racing results ===
(key) (Races in bold indicate pole position)

==== PPG Indycar Series ====
Year	Team	Chassis	Engine	1	2	3	4	5	6	7	8	9	10	11	12	13	14	15	16	17	Rank	Pts	Ref
1987	Curb Racing	March 87C	Ford Cosworth DFX	LBH	PHX	INDY	MIL	POR	MEA	CLE	TOR	MCH	POC	ROA; 6	MDO; 10	NAZ; 11	LAG; 7	MIA; 8			17th	24	
1988	Curb Racing	Lola T88/00	Ford Cosworth DFX	PHX; 14	LBH; 20	INDY; 21	MIL; 18	POR; 17	CLE; 8	TOR; 22	MEA; 25	MCH; 24	POC; 14	MDO	ROA	NAZ; 16	LAG	MIA			31st	5	
1989	Vince Granatelli Racing	Lola T88/00	Buick 3300 V6t	PHX	LBH	INDY; 25	MIL	DET	POR	CLE	MEA	TOR; 25	MCH; 24	POC; 17	MDO	ROA	NAZ; 19	LAG; 12			33rd	1	
1990	Porsche Motorsports	March 90P	Porsche Indy V8	PHX; 17	LBH; 21	INDY; 21	MIL; 7	DET; 22	POR; 21	CLE; 5	MEA; 7	TOR; 13	MCH; 7	DEN; 6	VAN; 5	MDO; 13	ROA; 22	NAZ; 19	LAG; 8		10th	51	
1991	Hall/VDS Racing	Lola T91/00	Chevrolet 265A	SRF; 1	LBH; 18	PHX; 11	INDY; 5	MIL; 2	DET; 6	POR; 19	CLE; 15	MEA; 4	TOR; 5	MCH; 6	DEN; 7	VAN; 7	MDO; 10	ROA; 19	NAZ; 9	LAG; 19	8th	105	
1992	Hall/VDS Racing	Lola T92/00	Chevrolet 265A	SRF; 6	PHX; 6	LBH; 20	INDY; 8	DET; 21	POR; 5	MIL; 9	NHA; 5	TOR; 5	MCH; 6	CLE; 12	ROA; 6	VAN; 15	MDO; 4	NAZ; 18	LAG; 5		8th	94	
1993	A. J. Foyt Enterprises	Lola T92/00	Ford XB	SRF	PHX	LBH	INDY; 10	MIL	DET	POR	CLE	TOR	MCH	NHA	ROA	VAN	MDO	NAZ	LAG		28th	3	
1994	A. J. Foyt Enterprises	Lola T94/00	Ford XB	SRF	PHX	LBH	INDY; 10	MIL	DET	POR	CLE	TOR	MCH	MDO	NHA	VAN	ROA	NAZ	LAG		29th	3	

==== IndyCar Series ====
Year	Team	No.	Chassis	Engine	1	2	3	4	5	6	7	8	9	10	11	12	13	14	15	16	17	18	19	Rank	Pts	Ref
2007	Panther Racing	33	Dallara IR-05	Honda	HMS	STP	MOT	KAN	INDY; 30	MIL	TXS	IOW	RIR	WGL	NSH	MDO	MCH	KTY	SNM	DET	CHI			35th	10	
2008	Roth Racing	29	Dallara IR-05	Honda	HMS	STP	MOT^{1}	LBH^{1}	KAN	INDY; 16	MIL; 19	TXS; 16	IOW; 11	RIR; 21	WGL	NSH	MDO	EDM	KTY	SNM	DET	CHI	SRF^{2}	30th	71	
2009	Dreyer & Reinbold Racing	43	Dallara IR-05	Honda	STP	LBH	KAN	INDY; 19	MIL	TXS	IOW	RIR	WGL	TOR	EDM	KTY	MDO	SNM	CHI	MOT	HMS			37th	12	
2010	Andretti Autosport	43	Dallara IR-05	Honda	SAO	STP	ALA	LBH	KAN; 9	INDY; 30	TXS	IOW	WGL	TOR	EDM	MDO	SNM	CHI	KTY	MOT	HMS			32nd	35	
2011	Andretti Autosport	43	Dallara IR-05	Honda	STP	ALA	LBH	SAO	INDY; 22	TXS	TXS	MIL	IOW	TOR	EDM	MDO	NWH	SNM	BAL	MOT	KTY	LVS^{3} C		42nd	16	

^{1} Run on same day.
^{2} Non-points-paying, exhibition race.
^{3} The Las Vegas Indy 300 was abandoned after Dan Wheldon died from injuries sustained in a 15-car crash on lap 11.

==== Indianapolis 500 results ====
Year	Chassis	Engine	Start	Finish	Team
1988	Lola T88/00	Ford Cosworth DFX	27	21	Curb Racing
1989	Lola T88/00	Buick	12	25	Vince Granatelli Racing
1990	March 90P	Porsche Motorsports	10	21	Porsche
1991	Lola T91/00	Chevrolet 265A	7	5	Hall/VDS Racing
1992	Lola T92/00	Chevrolet 265A	14	8	Hall/VDS Racing
1993	Lola T92/00	Ford XB	24	10	A. J. Foyt Enterprises
1994	Lola T94/00	Ford XB	10	10	A. J. Foyt Enterprises
2007	Dallara	Honda	24	30	Panther Racing
2008	Dallara	Honda	21	16	Roth Racing
2009	Dallara	Honda	28	19	Richard Petty/DRR
2010	Dallara	Honda	28	30	Richard Petty/Andretti Autosport
2011	Dallara	Honda	17	22	Richard Petty/Andretti Autosport

=== Complete Bathurst 1000 results ===
Year	Team	Car	Co-driver	Class	Position	Laps
1988	Garry Rogers Motorsport	Holden Commodore VL	(Australia) Garry Rogers	Gr.A	DNF	37

=== 24 Hours of Le Mans ===
Year	Team	Co-Drivers	Car	Class	Laps	Pos.	Class Pos.
1988	(Germany) Porsche AG	(United States) Mario Andretti (United States) Michael Andretti	Porsche 962C	C1	375	6th	6th

=== 24 Hours of Daytona ===
Year	Team	Co-drivers	Car	Class	Laps	Position	Class Pos.
1989	(United States) Miller High Life/BF Goodrich 962	(United Kingdom) Derek Bell (France) Bob Wollek	Porsche 962	GTP	621	**1st**	**1st**
1993	(United Kingdom) Jaguar Racing	(Australia) David Brabham (United States) Davy Jones (Denmark) John Nielsen	Jaguar XJR-12	LM	92	58th ^{DNF}	**2nd** ^{DNF}
2008	(United States) Vision Racing	(United States) Ed Carpenter (United States) A. J. Foyt IV (United States) Tony George (Brazil) Vítor Meira	Crawford DP08	DP	615	25th ^{DNF}	12th ^{DNF}
2012	(United States) Yellow Dragon Motorsports	(United States) Jarett Andretti (Canada) Taylor Hacquard (Norway) Anders Krohn	Mazda RX-8	GT	270	50th ^{DNF}	36th ^{DNF}

=== NASCAR ===
(key) (Bold – Pole position awarded by qualifying time. Italics – Pole position earned by points standings or practice time. * – Most laps led.)

==== Sprint Cup Series ====
NASCAR Sprint Cup Series results
Year	Team	No.	Make	1	2	3	4	5	6	7	8	9	10	11	12	13	14	15	16	17	18	19	20	21	22	23	24	25	26	27	28	29	30	31	32	33	34	35	36	NSCC	Pts	Ref
1993	Tex Racing	72	Chevy	DAY	CAR	RCH	ATL	DAR	BRI	NWS	MAR	TAL	SON	CLT	DOV	POC	MCH	DAY	NHA	POC	TAL	GLN	MCH	BRI	DAR	RCH	DOV	MAR	NWS; 24	CLT; 31	CAR; 39	PHO; 40	ATL; DNQ							50th	250	
1994	Hagan Racing	14	Chevy	DAY; 42	CAR; 24	RCH; 30	ATL; 42	DAR; 38	BRI; DNQ	NWS; 31	MAR; 35	TAL; 29	SON; 19	CLT; 36	DOV; 22	POC; 35	MCH; 36	DAY; 35	NHA; 27	POC; 25	TAL; 40	IND; 28	GLN																	32nd	2299	
1994	Petty Enterprises	43	Pontiac																					MCH; 17	BRI; 30	DAR; 16	RCH; 11	DOV; 25	MAR; 21	NWS; 17	CLT; 24	CAR; 25	PHO; 43	ATL; 13						32nd	2299	
1995	Kranefuss-Haas Racing	37	Ford	DAY; 27	CAR; 13	RCH; 10	ATL; 20	DAR; 10	BRI; 19	NWS; 17	MAR; 32	TAL; 41	SON; 11	CLT; 17	DOV; 39	POC; 30	MCH; 4	DAY; 33	NHA; 33	POC; 38	TAL; 34	IND; 12	GLN; 7	MCH; 37	BRI; 19	**DAR**; 12	RCH; 7	DOV; 39	MAR; 13	NWS; 17	CLT; 13	CAR; 25	PHO; 15	ATL; 15						18th	3140	
1996	Kranefuss-Haas Racing	37	Ford	DAY; 38	CAR; 38	RCH; 12	ATL; 21	DAR; 40	BRI; DNQ	NWS; 34	MAR; 36	TAL; 9	SON; 11	CLT; 27	DOV; 33	POC; 16	MCH; 24	DAY; 23	NHA; 40	POC; 23	TAL; 39	IND; 19	GLN; 26	MCH; 31	BRI; 38	DAR; 5														31st	2621	
1996	Cale Yarborough Motorsports	98	Ford																								RCH; 36	DOV; 14	MAR; 5	NWS; 24	CLT; 39	CAR; 26	PHO; 19	ATL; 24						31st	2621	
1997	Cale Yarborough Motorsports	98	Ford	DAY; 25	CAR; 34	RCH; 31	ATL; 15	DAR; 25	TEX; 12	BRI; 24	MAR; 28	SON; 30	**TAL**; 4	CLT; 30	DOV; 29	POC; 40	MCH; 37	CAL; 21	DAY; 1*	NHA; 14	POC; 24	IND; 17	GLN; 20	MCH; 35	BRI; 11	DAR; 37	RCH; 22	NHA; 17	DOV; 15	MAR; 29	CLT; 32	TAL; 3	CAR; 31	PHO; 39	ATL; 22					23rd	3019	
1998	Petty Enterprises	43	Pontiac	DAY; 18	CAR; 13	LVS; 41	**ATL**; 20	DAR; 13	BRI; 19	TEX; 42	MAR; 18	TAL; 33	CAL; 31	CLT; 7	DOV; 12	RCH; 22	MCH; 20	POC; 13	SON; 3	NHA; 6	POC; 12	IND; 7	GLN; 8	MCH; 9	BRI; 38	NHA; 3	DAR; 14	RCH; 5	DOV; 9	MAR; 37	CLT; 12	TAL; 21	DAY; 14	PHO; 6	CAR; 34	ATL; 32				11th	3682	
1999	Petty Enterprises	43	Pontiac	DAY; 43	CAR; 19	LVS; 12	ATL; 28	DAR; 9	TEX; 38	BRI; 4	MAR; 1	TAL; 9	CAL; 17	RCH; 39	CLT; 19	DOV; 13	MCH; 8	POC; 28	SON; 3	DAY; 19	NHA; 18	POC; 42	IND; 37	GLN; 29	MCH; 10	BRI; 40	DAR; 18	RCH; 9	NHA; 41	DOV; 41	MAR; 43	CLT; 17	TAL; 32	CAR; 7	**PHO**; 8	HOM; 16	ATL; 33			17th	3394	
2000	Petty Enterprises	43	Pontiac	DAY; 22	CAR; 12	LVS; 25	ATL; 18	DAR; 20	BRI; 33	TEX; 32	MAR; 14	TAL; 11	CAL; 25	RCH; 18	CLT; 31	DOV; 13	MCH; 9	POC; 21	SON; 43	DAY; 14	NHA; 40	POC; 41	IND; 42	GLN; 37	MCH; 27	BRI; 20	DAR; 37	RCH; 11	NHA; 7	DOV; 22	MAR; 13	CLT; 18	TAL; 20	CAR; 23	PHO; 28	HOM; 37	ATL; 19			23rd	3169	
2001	Petty Enterprises	43	Dodge	DAY; 39	CAR; 21	LVS; 37	ATL; 14	DAR; 6	BRI; 2	TEX; 31	MAR; 35	TAL; 37	CAL; 26	RCH; 34	CLT; DNQ	DOV; 19	MCH; 37	POC; 39	SON; 30	DAY; 22	CHI; 23	NHA; 23	POC; 27	IND; 14	GLN; 14	MCH; 26	BRI; 21	DAR; 21	RCH; 30	DOV; 19	KAN; 39	CLT; 26	MAR; 33	TAL; 34	PHO; 39	CAR; 29	HOM; 22	ATL; 25	NHA; 36	31st	2943	
2002	Petty Enterprises	43	Dodge	DAY; 37	CAR; 15	LVS; 36	ATL; 36	DAR; 22	BRI; 34	TEX; 22	MAR; 42	TAL; 38	CAL; 24	RCH; 20	CLT; 15	DOV; 32	POC; 31	MCH; 23	SON; 10	DAY; 24	CHI; 22	NHA; 25	POC; 23	IND; 26	GLN; 11	MCH; 20	BRI; 19	DAR; 42	RCH; 29	NHA; 22	DOV; 29	KAN; 14	TAL; 18	CLT; 23	MAR; 13	ATL; 43	CAR; 18	PHO; 14	HOM; 39	28th	3161	
2003	Petty Enterprises	43	Dodge	DAY; 34	CAR; 39	LVS; 18	ATL; 29	DAR; 38	BRI; 31	TEX; 19	TAL; 14	MAR; 30	CAL; 8	RCH; 30	CLT; 39	DOV; 34	POC; 23	MCH	SON	DAY	CHI																			38th	2379	
2003	Haas CNC Racing	0	Pontiac																			NHA; 41	POC; 33		GLN; 19	MCH	BRI	DAR												38th	2379	
2003	Dale Earnhardt, Inc.	81	Chevy																					IND; 43																38th	2379	
2003	Dale Earnhardt, Inc.	1	Chevy																										RCH; 14	NHA; 12	DOV; 34		KAN; 19	CLT; 30	MAR; 31	ATL; 22	PHO; 16	CAR; 30	HOM; 42	38th	2379	
2003	Richard Childress Racing	90	Chevy																													TAL; 15								38th	2379	
2004	Dale Earnhardt, Inc.	1	Chevy	DAY; 13	CAR; 29	LVS	ATL	DAR	BRI	TEX	MAR	TAL	CAL	RCH	CLT; 19	DOV	POC	MCH	SON	DAY; 43	CHI; 16	NHA																		45th	818	
2004	Dale Earnhardt, Inc.	8	Chevy																				POC; RL^{†}	IND	GLN	MCH	BRI	CAL	RCH	NHA	DOV	TAL	KAN							45th	818	
2004	Ppc Racing	14	Ford																															CLT; 22	MAR	ATL; 25	PHO; 31	DAR; DNQ	HOM; 20	45th	818	
2005	Ppc Racing	14	Ford	DAY; 31	CAL; 29	LVS; 28	ATL; DNQ	BRI	MAR	TEX	PHO	TAL	DAR	RCH	CLT	DOV	POC	MCH	SON	DAY	CHI	NHA	POC	IND	GLN															55th	304	
2005	Morgan-McClure Motorsports	4	Chevy																							MCH; 28	BRI	CAL; DNQ	RCH	NHA	DOV	TAL	KAN	CLT	MAR	ATL	TEX	PHO	HOM	55th	304	
2007	Front Row Motorsports	37	Dodge	DAY	CAL; 34	LVS; DNQ	ATL; DNQ	BRI	MAR	TEX; DNQ	PHO; DNQ	TAL; DNQ	RCH	DAR	CLT	DOV	POC																							48th	932	
2007	Petty Enterprises	45	Dodge															MCH; 27	SON	NHA; 42	DAY; 28	CHI; 18	IND	POC	GLN															48th	932	
2007	BAM Racing	49	Dodge																							MCH; 37	BRI; 40	CAL; 37	RCH; 37	NHA; DNQ	DOV; 37	KAN; 33	TAL; 33	CLT; 42	MAR; 33	ATL; 28	TEX; DNQ	PHO; DNQ	HOM; DNQ	48th	932	
2008	Front Row Motorsports	34	Chevy	DAY; 40	CAL; 35	LVS; DNQ	ATL; DNQ	BRI; DNQ	MAR; DNQ	TEX; 40	PHO; DNQ	TAL; DNQ	RCH; DNQ	DAR	CLT	DOV	POC	MCH	SON	NHA	DAY	CHI	IND	POC	GLN	MCH	BRI	CAL	RCH	NHA	DOV	KAN	TAL	CLT	MAR	ATL	TEX	PHO	HOM	62nd	149	
2009	Front Row Motorsports	34	Chevy	DAY; 19	CAL; 31	LVS; 28	ATL; 29	BRI; 34	MAR; 35	TEX; 26	PHO; 38	TAL; 27	RCH; 32	DAR	CLT	DOV; 34	POC; 35	MCH; 33	SON; 30	NHA; 16	DAY; 27	CHI; 30	IND; 32	POC; 30	GLN; 30	MCH; 28	BRI; 30	ATL; 31	RCH; 29	NHA; 26	DOV; 27	KAN; 33	CAL; 19	CLT; 36	MAR; 26	TAL; 23	TEX; 24	PHO; 34	HOM; 33	36th	2597	
2010	Front Row Motorsports	34	Ford	DAY; 38	CAL	LVS	ATL	BRI	MAR	PHO	TEX	TAL	RCH	DAR	DOV	CLT	POC	MCH	SON	NHA	DAY	CHI	IND	POC	GLN	MCH	BRI	ATL	RCH	NHA	DOV	KAN	CAL	CLT	MAR	TAL	TEX	PHO	HOM	71st	49	
^{†} - Relieved Dale Earnhardt Jr. during race

===== Daytona 500 =====
Year	Team	Manufacturer	Start	Finish
1994	Hagan Racing	Chevrolet	15	42
1995	Kranefuss-Haas Racing	Ford	38	27
1996	Kranefuss-Haas Racing	Ford	6	38
1997	Cale Yarborough Motorsports	Ford	32	25
1998	Petty Enterprises	Pontiac	17	18
1999	Petty Enterprises	Pontiac	36	43
2000	Petty Enterprises	Pontiac	30	22
2001	Petty Enterprises	Dodge	26	39
2002	Petty Enterprises	Dodge	16	37
2003	Petty Enterprises	Dodge	12	34
2004	Dale Earnhardt, Inc.	Chevrolet	29	13
2005	Ppc Racing	Ford	42	31
2008	Front Row Motorsports	Chevrolet	22	40
2009	Front Row Motorsports	Chevrolet	37	19
2010	Front Row Motorsports	Ford	33	38

==== Busch Series ====
NASCAR Busch Series results
Year	Team	No.	Make	1	2	3	4	5	6	7	8	9	10	11	12	13	14	15	16	17	18	19	20	21	22	23	24	25	26	27	28	29	30	31	32	33	34	35	NBGNC	Pts	Ref
1998	Andretti-Laird Racing	96	Chevy	DAY; 13	CAR	LVS	NSV	DAR	BRI	TEX	HCY	TAL	NHA	NZH	CLT	DOV	RCH	PPR	GLN	MLW	MYB	CAL	SBO	IRP	MCH	BRI	DAR	RCH	DOV	CLT	GTY	CAR	ATL	HOM					93rd	124	
2005	Ppc Racing	10	Ford	DAY	CAL	MXC	LVS	ATL	NSH	BRI	TEX	PHO	TAL	DAR	RCH	CLT	DOV	NSH	KEN	MLW	DAY	CHI	NHA	PPR	GTY	IRP	GLN	MCH	BRI	CAL	RCH	DOV	KAN	CLT	MEM	TEX	PHO	HOM; DNQ	NA	-	
2006	Ppc Racing	10	Ford	DAY; 34	CAL; 19	MXC; 23	LVS; 42	ATL; 20	BRI; 9	TEX; 19	NSH; 28	PHO; 34	TAL; 16	RCH; 19	DAR; 15	CLT; 17	DOV; 19	NSH; 18	KEN; 15	MLW; 12	DAY; 10	CHI; 25	NHA; 18	MAR; 7	GTY; 26	IRP; 27	GLN; 5	MCH; 30	BRI; 14	CAL; 29	RCH; 16	DOV; 19	KAN; 23	CLT; 25	MEM; 35	TEX; 15	PHO; 25	HOM; 16	12th	3562	
2007	Ppc Racing	10	Toyota	DAY; 39	CAL	MXC	LVS	ATL	BRI	NSH	TEX	PHO	TAL	RCH	DAR	CLT	DOV	NSH	KEN	MLW	NHA	DAY	CHI	GTY	IRP	CGV	GLN	MCH	BRI	CAL	RCH	DOV	KAN	CLT	MEM	TEX	PHO	HOM	147th	46	

==== Craftsman Truck Series ====
NASCAR Craftsman Truck Series results
Year	Team	No.	Make	1	2	3	4	5	6	7	8	9	10	11	12	13	14	15	16	17	18	19	20	21	22	23	24	25	NCTC	Pts	Ref
2005	Billy Ballew Motorsports	15	Chevy	DAY	CAL	ATL	MAR	GTY	MFD	CLT	DOV	TEX	MCH	MLW	KAN; 9	KEN	MEM; 8	IRP; 36	NSH; 11	BRI	RCH	NHA	LVS	MAR	ATL	TEX	PHO	HOM	46th	465	
2008	Billy Ballew Motorsports	15	Toyota	DAY	CAL	ATL	MAR	KAN	CLT	MFD	DOV	TEX	MCH	MLW	MEM	KEN	IRP	NSH	BRI	GTW	NHA	LVS; 4	TAL; 14	MAR	ATL	TEX	PHO	HOM	53rd	291	

== Bibliography ==
- Andretti, John (September 1, 2020). Racer: John Andretti. Octane Press. ISBN 978-1642340211.
