= Maximum Effort =

American film production company

Maximum Effort Productions, Inc.
- Logo used since 2020
- Type: Private
- Industry: Film, television, advertising
- Founded: 2018; 8 years ago
- Founder: Ryan Reynolds; George Dewey
- Headquarters: New York City, U.S.
- Key people: Ryan Reynolds (president); Ashley Fox (co-president); Johnny Pariseau (co-president)
- Website: maximumeffort.com

Maximum Effort Productions, Inc. is an American film production company and digital marketing agency founded by Canadian actor Ryan Reynolds alongside George Dewey in 2018. The company's name is a reference to a catchphrase from Reynolds' 2016 film Deadpool. In 2025, the company was named one of Time's 100 most influential companies.

== History ==
Reynolds and Dewey launched Maximum Effort in 2018, after having collaborated on the marketing campaign for the first two Deadpool films. They worked on a series of successful low-budget ads to promote the 2016 film and its 2018 sequel, which at the time were the highest-grossing R-rated films ever. Dewey, formerly senior vice president of digital marketing at 20th Century Fox and president of digital marketing at Annapurna Pictures, was named president of the company, and Reynolds is creative director.

Maximum Effort's marketing arm was acquired by advertising software company MNTN in June 2021, with Maximum Effort Marketing keeping its name while operating as an agency within MNTN. Reynolds was named MNTN's chief creative officer, and Dewey MNTN's chief brand officer. MNTN was founded in 2009 as Steelhouse, rebranding itself in 2021. In September 2024, Bloomberg News reported that MNTN was planning to go public in 2025, with Morgan Stanley to organize its initial public offering; however, in MNTN's IPO filing (i.e. Form S-1) with the Securities and Exchange Commission, which was filed February 28, 2025, MNTN disclosed that it has agreed to divest "its interest in Maximum Effort to an affiliate of its original owner" and in connection with the transaction, MNTN provided a line of credit of up to $5.0 million, which was drawn upon. The sale closed on April 1, 2025. The filing also notes that MNTN will enter into a creative services agreement with Maximum Effort; however, as of May 14, 2025, no agreement has been reached.

== Film and television production ==
Maximum Effort was one of the production companies on the 2018 film Deadpool 2, directed by David Leitch and starring Reynolds and Josh Brolin, on 2021's Free Guy, directed by Shawn Levy and starring Reynolds and Jodie Comer, on 2022's The Adam Project, directed by Levy and starring Reynolds, Mark Ruffalo, Jennifer Garner and Walker Scobell, and on 2024's Deadpool & Wolverine, directed by Levy and starring Reynolds, Hugh Jackman, Morena Baccarin, Brianna Hildebrand and Garner.

Maximum Effort Productions projects include the musical Spirited, directed by Sean Anders and starring Reynolds and Will Ferrell. The company also produces the FX docuseries Welcome to Wrexham. In May 2021, Maximum Effort Productions closed a three-year first-look development deal with Paramount Pictures for all their feature films. In August 2022, it was announced Maximum Effort would launch a free ad-supported streaming TV channel, which launched in June 2023 on FuboTV and other platforms. The first original program on the channel was entitled Bedtime Stories with Ryan and premiered June 20, 2023. In June 2023, it was announced that Maximum Effort had made a deal with Welsh language channel S4C to show six hours of Welsh language programming per week which Reynolds has referred to as "Welsh Wednesdays". The channel shut down in January 2025.

In February 2023, Maximum Effort announced the development of a 1.2 million-square-foot studio to be built in Markham, Ontario, Canada, just outside of Toronto. In March 2025, the company signed a first-look deal with 20th Television.

In August 2025, Maximum Effort was announced as a production company on Close Personal Friends, a comedy film directed by Jason Orley and produced for Amazon MGM Studios. The film stars Brie Larson, Lily Collins, Jack Quaid and Henry Golding.

In November 2025, Maximum Effort was announced as a production company involved with Eloise, a live-action comedy film based on the children's book series. MRC acquired the rights to the Eloise property in 2019, while Netflix acquired the rights to the film in 2025. The film stars Mae Schenk as Eloise and Reynolds in an original villainous role.

In 2026, Maximum Effort was a production company on Mayday, an Apple Original Films action comedy starring Reynolds and Kenneth Branagh, which was released on September 4, 2026. It received positive reviews from critics and performed strongly on streaming following its release. It was the number one movie on Apple TV in 100 countries as of September 13. On the review aggregator website Rotten Tomatoes, 83% of 103 critics' reviews are positive. The website's consensus reads: "A spirited adventure that gets a lot of mileage from clever quips and Kenneth Branagh's extremely amusing performance, Mayday thaws Cold War tensions with good-natured aplomb."

In June 2026, Maximum Effort was announced as a producer on an untitled action comedy for Netflix. It starred Kevin Hart and Henry Cavill and directed by McG, alongside producing companies such as Shaw Levy's 21 Laps and Hart's Hartbeat. In September, Maximum Effort announced Spy School, a television series in development for Disney+ based on Stuart Gibbs' book series. The series is being produced by Maximum Effort under its first-look deal with 20th Television.

== Marketing ==
Maximum Effort Marketing has created ads for Reynolds' brands Aviation Gin and Mint Mobile, films such as Deadpool 2 and Free Guy, and for Match.com, R.M. Williams, and the NAACP Legal Defense Fund. One of the Aviation Gin spots went viral, as a spoof on a Peloton holiday commercial that had received significant backlash, with both ads starring the same actress, Monica Ruiz. A spot for Mint Mobile featured Rick Moranis, in a rare public appearance for the actor, and an advertising stunt for Aviation Gin and Laughing Man Coffee had a faux Twitter war between Reynolds and Hugh Jackman. A video for Match.com went viral at the end of 2020, as it featured Satan dating the year 2020 and debuted a snippet of Taylor Swift's "Love Story (Taylor's Version)".

In December 2021, following the release of the Sex and the City revival series And Just Like That..., and the death of Mr. Big on a Peloton bike, shares in Peloton fell. Maximum Effort quickly devised an advertisement for Peloton featuring Chris Noth. Reynolds provided the voiceover promoting the health benefits that cycling can have, and noting that Chris Noth/Mr. Big was still alive.

The company has gained recognition for its ability to produce ads quickly, an approach Reynolds calls "Fastvertising." In 2025, Maximum Effort produced a "fastvertsing" response video starring Gwyneth Paltrow for Astronomer after a viral scandal involving its CEO.

Maximum Effort led the creative effort for Pantalones Organic Tequila's launch campaign, featuring co-founders Matthew McConaughey and Camila McConaughey. The campaign included the "Buckle Up" advertisement and materials across out-of-home, digital, audio, and in-store media. In May 8, 2026, the company was credited as the agency on "The Most Interesting Mother in the World," a Mother's Day campaign for Pantalones Organic Tequila featuring Matthew McConaughey, his mother Kay "MacMac" McConaughey, and Camila Alves McConaughey. The campaign was named Campaign US's "Ad of the Week."

Following the rescue acquisition of Coyote vs. Acme from Warner Bros. Pictures by Ketchup Entertainment, Maximum Effort was hired by Ketchup to assist with marketing the film. Maximum Effort largely leaned on the film's controversy involving it almost being written off by Warner Bros. for tax purposes as part of the marketing. The company built the campaign around the film's underdog story and "ACME as the bad guy" concept, and extended the messaging across trailers, television, digital, social media and other content. The campaign accompanied the film's theatrical release, which surpassed $100 million at the worldwide box office.

=== Non-profit ===
In September 2022, Maximum Effort partnered with Brooks Bell and the Colorectal Cancer Alliance on the "Lead From Behind" campaign, featuring Ryan Reynolds and Rob McElhenney undergoing and filming their colonoscopies to raise awareness of colorectal cancer screening. The initiative continued with subsequent nonprofit marketing campaign videos by featuring celebrities including Terry Crews, Dak Prescott and Katie Couric.

In December 2024, Maximum produced Ryan Reynolds’ annual Christmas video supporting the Hospital for Sick Children (SickKids). The video featured Reynolds as Deadpool, his daughter Inez Reynolds as Kidpool, and Lynda Carter.

In December 2025, Maximum Effort created and produced Ryan Reynolds' annual holiday fundraising video supporting the SickKids Foundation. The video featured Los Angeles Dodgers first baseman Freddie Freeman and SickKids patient ambassadors.

In September 2026, Maximum Effort produced a public service announcement in partnership with the Michael J. Fox Foundation, featuring Michael J. Fox and Harrison Ford to raise awareness about supporting people living with Parkinson’s disease.

== Sports ==
Maximum Effort helps secure major sponsorship agreements, manage commercial partnerships and contribute to the marketing growth for Wrexham AFC.

In May 2024, Maximum Effort made an investment in Homage, a sports and licensed apparel company based in Columbus, Ohio. Maximum Effort was the lead investor in the funding round, and a representative of the company joined Homage's board.

In February 2025, Maximum Effort produced a Super Bowl commercial for STōK Cold Brew featuring Channing Tatum and players from Wrexham AFC. The advertisement, titled "Hollywood Magic," was created to promote STōK’s partnership with Wrexham AFC. In the previous year, Maximum Effort created a regional and streaming Super Bowl commercial for STōK Cold Brew featuring Anthony Hopkins as Wrex the Dragon, the mascot of Wrexham AFC. The advertisement was produced in collaboration with Danone's internal Harvest Creative group and directed by Bryan Rowland.

In May 2026, Maximum Effort was announced as the production company behind a Disney+ docuseries following the SailGP's BONDS Flying Roos from Australia and its co-owners Hugh Jackman and Ryan Reynolds. The series is produced by Maximum Effort and Eureka Productions in partnership with SailGP and the BONDS Flying Roos team.

== Filmography ==
=== Film ===
Year	Title	Production partners	Distributors
2018	Deadpool 2	Marvel Entertainment, Kinberg Genre, The Donners' Company	20th Century Fox
2021	Free Guy	20th Century Studios, Berlanti Productions, 21 Laps Entertainment, Lit Entertainment Group	Walt Disney Studios Motion Pictures
2022	The Adam Project	Skydance Media, 21 Laps Entertainment	Netflix
2022	Spirited	Apple Original Films, Gloria Sanchez Productions, Mosaic, Two Grown Men	Apple TV+
2022	Shotgun Wedding	Summit Entertainment, Lionsgate, Mandeville Films, Nuyorican Productions	Amazon Studios
2024	IF	Sunday Night Productions	Paramount Pictures
2024	Deadpool & Wolverine	Marvel Studios, 21 Laps Entertainment	Walt Disney Studios Motion Pictures
2025	John Candy: I Like Me	Amazon MGM Studios, Company Name, Zipper Bros. Films	Amazon Prime Video
2026	Mayday	Apple Studios, Skydance Media	Apple TV
2027	Animal Friends	Legendary Pictures, Prime Focus Studios	Warner Bros. Pictures
TBA	Aunt Roxie	—N/a	Netflix
TBA	Close Personal Friends	Walk-Up Company	Amazon MGM Studios
TBA	Society of Explorers and Adventurers	Walt Disney Pictures	Walt Disney Studios Motion Pictures
TBA	Rachel Nevada	—N/a	Paramount Pictures
TBA	Boy Band	21 Laps Entertainment	Paramount Pictures
TBA	Calamity Hustle	Free Association, Persons Attempting	Warner Bros. Pictures
TBA	Dragon's Lair	Underground Films, Vertigo Entertainment	Netflix
TBA	IF 2	Sunday Night Productions	Paramount Pictures
TBA	Eloise	MRC, HandMade Films, Simon & Schuster	Netflix
TBA	Eight Perfect Murders	Regency Enterprises	TBA
TBA	Gaslight Express	—N/a	Paramount Pictures
TBA	I Eat Poop: A Dung Beetle Story	Paramount Animation	Paramount Pictures
TBA	Starter Villain	—N/a	Paramount Pictures
TBA	The Last Disturbance of Madeline Hynde	TKBC	TBA
TBA	Thunderbolt and Lightfoot	—N/a	Amazon MGM Studios
TBA	Untitled international heist film	21 Laps Entertainment, Genre Films	Netflix
TBA	Untitled Mighty Mouse film	Paramount Animation	Paramount Pictures
TBA	Untitled Colin Trevorrow film	Metronome Film Co.	Paramount Pictures
TBA	Everyday Parenting Tips	Lord Miller	Universal Pictures

=== Short film ===
Year	Title	Production partners	Distributors
2021	Deadpool and Korg React	—N/a	YouTube

=== Television ===
Year	Title	Production partners	Network
2020	Don't	Banijay Studios North America	ABC
2022–present	Welcome to Wrexham	FXP, Boardwalk Pictures, 3 Arts Entertainment, RCG Productions, DN2 Productions	FX
2024	Neon Dimension	Fubo Studios, Maximum Effort Channel	FuboTV
2025	Underdogs	Wildstar Films	National Geographic
2025	Necaxa	Hyphenate Media Group, More Better Productions, 3 Arts Entertainment	FXX
2026	Bedtime Stories with Ryan	TBA	Nick Jr.
TBA	Biker Mice from Mars	The Nacelle Company, Maximum Effort Channel	FuboTV
