= Eva Longoria: Searching for France =

- Genre: Food, travel
- Presented by: Eva Longoria
- Country of origin: United States
- Original languages: English, French
- No. of seasons: 1
- No. of episodes: 8

Production
- Executive producers: Eva Longoria; Cris Abrego; Rachelle Mendez; Shauna Minoprio; Eve Kay; Amy Entelis; Lyle Gamm
- Production location: France
- Production companies: Hyphenate Media Group; Dragonfly; CNN Original Series

Original release
- Network: CNN
- Release: April 12, 2026 – present

Eva Longoria: Searching for France is an American travel and food television series presented by Eva Longoria, which premiered on April 12, 2026, on CNN.

The series follows Eva Longoria as she travels across France, exploring the country's culinary traditions and culture. The series follows Longoria's previous Searching for series for CNN in Spain.

In May 2026, the series was renewed for second season, which will be released in 2027.

== Episodes ==
Season	Episodes	Originally released	
Season	Episodes	First released	Last released
1	8	April 12, 2026	May 10, 2026

No.	Title	Original release date
1	"Paris"	April 12, 2026
2	"Paris Pastry"	April 12, 2026
3	"Provence"	April 19, 2026
4	"Bordeaux"	April 19, 2026
5	"Burgundy"	May 3, 2026
6	"Alsace"	May 3, 2026
7	"France in Seven Courses"	May 10, 2026
8	"Brittany"	May 10, 2026

== Development ==
On May 14, 2025, it was announced during the 2025 Warner Bros. Discovery upfront that CNN had ordered a travel and food series presented by Eva Longoria, based in France. The series is the third installment of Longoria's Searching for series for CNN, following her previous series in Mexico and Spain. On March 10, 2026, it was announced that the 8-episode series was scheduled to release on April 12, 2026.

On May 13, 2026, it was announced that the series was renewed for a second season, and will be released in 2027.

The series is executive produced by Eva Longoria, Cris Abrego, Rachelle Mendez, Shauna Minoprio, Eve Kay, Amy Entelis, and Lyle Gamm. Production companies involved with the series are Longoria and Abrego's Hyphenate Media Group, Dragonfly, and CNN Original Series.
