= Necaxa (disambiguation) =

Club Necaxa is a Mexican football club.

Necaxa may also refer to:

- Club Necaxa (women), the female division
- Necaxa River, Mexico
- Necaxa (TV series), a documentary season about Club Necaxa
- C.D. Necaxa, a Honduran football club
- Necaxa (Mexico City Metrobús), a BRT station in Mexico City
