= Eva Longoria: Searching for Spain =

- Genre: Food, travel
- Presented by: Eva Longoria
- Country of origin: United States
- Original languages: English, Spanish
- No. of seasons: 1
- No. of episodes: 8

Production
- Executive producers: Eva Longoria; Cris Abrego; Rachelle Mendez; Shauna Minoprio; Amy Entelis; Lyle Gamm
- Production location: Spain
- Production companies: Hyphenate Media Group; CNN Original Series

Original release
- Network: CNN
- Release: April 27 – July 6, 2025

Eva Longoria: Searching for Spain is an American travel and food television series presented by Eva Longoria, which premiered on April 27, 2025, on CNN.

The series follows Eva Longoria as she travels and takes a culinary tour around Spain. The series follows Longoria's previous Searching for series in Mexico, and is followed by a series in France.

== Episodes ==
Season	Episodes	Originally released	
Season	Episodes	First released	Last released
1	8	April 27, 2025	July 6, 2025

No.	Title	Original release date
1	"Barcelona and the Catalonia Region"	April 27, 2025
2	"Seville and the Andalusia Region"	May 3, 2025
3	"Madrid"	May 11, 2025
4	"San Sebastián and the Basque Country"	May 18, 2025
5	"Galicia"	June 1, 2025
6	"Asturias"	June 8, 2025
7	"Marbella"	July 6, 2025
8	"Spain's Big Bang"	July 6, 2025

== Development ==
On May 15, 2024, it was announced at the 2024 Warner Bros. Discovery upfront that CNN had ordered a travel and food series presented by Eva Longoria, based in Spain. The series is a follow-up from the previous Searching For travel and food series which Longoria presented in Mexico. On February 24, 2025, it was announced that the 8-episode series was scheduled to release on April 27, 2025.

The series is executive produced by Eva Longoria, Cris Abrego, Rachelle Mendez, Shauna Minoprio, Amy Entelis, and Lyle Gamm. Production companies involved with the series are Longoria and Abrego's Hyphenate Media Group and CNN Original Series.
