= Hyphenate Media Group =

American film and television production company

- Type: Private
- Industry: Production company
- Founded: October 2023; 3 years ago
- Founders: Eva Longoria; Cris Abrego
- Headquarters: Beverly Hills, California, U.S.
- Key people: Eva Longoria (CCO); Cris Abrego (CEO)
- Owner: Banijay America (2023-present)
- Subsidiaries: UnbeliEVAble Entertainment
- Website: hyphenatemediagroup.com

Hyphenate Media Group is an American film and television production company founded in October 2023 by actress, producer, and director Eva Longoria, and television producer, writer, and media executive, Cris Abrego. In October 2023, the company acquired Longoria's production company UnbeliEVAble Entertainment, which was founded in 2005, and became a subsidiary of the company. UnbeliEVAble Entertainment had previously produced the film John Wick (2014), and the television series Ready for Love, Telenovela, and Grand Hotel.

== History ==
=== 2005–2022: UnbeliEVAble Entertainment ===
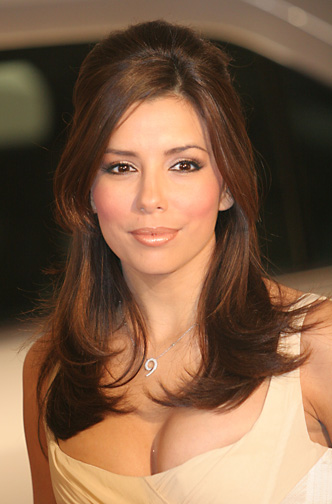
The company's founder Eva Longoria in 2006

In 2005, American actress, producer, and director Eva Longoria founded the production company, UnbeliEVAble Entertainment, in California, United States. In 2012, the company signed a first-look development deal with Universal Television.

In August 2016, the company signed a two-year first-look deal with Universal Pictures from 2016 to 2018. Also in August 2016, Will Rack joined the company as vice president and Jaimie Borislow joined as executive assistant. Before joining the company, Rack was an associate producer at 21 Laps Entertainment. Rack left the company in March 2020. Borislow was promoted to Creative Executive.

In September 2020, the company signed a three-year first-look deal with 20th Television. In April 2021, Adriana Martínez Barrón joined the company as vice president of film, until January 2022. In April 2022, Sandra Condito joined the company as president of television and film, succeeding Ben Spector who left the company also in April 2022. Before joining the company, Condito was the senior vice president of International Production and Development at Sony Pictures.

In March 2022, the company partnered with My Cultura Podcast Network, an iHeartMedia owned podcast network, to create multiple scripted and unscripted podcasts. Podcasts launched through the partnership include: Connections With Eva Longoria, a guests based podcast hosted by Longoria, Sisters of the Underground, a podcast that follows the true story of the Mirabal sisters, and Hungry for History with Eva Longoria and Maite Gomez-Rejón, a food podcast hosted by Longoria and American author Maite Gomez-Rejón.

In September 2022, the company partnered with short-form video social network TikTok, and media company MACRO, to create a content creator incubator called the "Latinx Creatives Grant", which helps selected Latinx content creators on TikTok financially, and with "educational programming and networking opportunities".

=== 2023–present: Hyphenate Media Group ===
In October 2023, Hyphenate Media Group was co-founded by Longoria, and television producer, writer, media executive, and chairman of the Americas at Banijay, Cris Abrego. Longoria will serve as Hyphenate's co-founder and chief creative officer, and Abrego will serve as co-founder and CEO. Banijay also has a strategic investment in the company. Longoria's UnbeliEVAble Entertainment and its filmography was acquired by Hyphenate Media Group, and is now a subsidiary of the new company.

In March 2024, it was announced that Jada Miranda had joined the company as the company's president of television, Karla Pita Loor had joined as chief strategy officer, and Alex Chang joined as chief operating officer. Before joining the company, Miranda was president of scripted television and production at STX Entertainment, and both Loor and Chang join the company from Banijay Americas.

In June 2024, it was announced that Rachelle Mendez had joined the company as head of unscripted, overseeing the development and production of new unscripted television series. Mendez is an 8-time Emmy Award winner.

== Filmography ==
=== Film ===
Year	Title	Director	Gross (worldwide)	Notes	Ref.
2014	John Wick	Chad Stahelski (Note: Stahelski co-directed the film with David Leitch, but the Directors Guild of America awarded sole directorial credit to Stahelski; Leitch is instead listed as a producer.)	$86 million	with Summit Entertainment, Thunder Road Films, 87Eleven Productions, MJW Films, DefyNite Films, and Company Films	
2018	Reversing Roe	Ricki Stern and Anne Sundberg	—N/a	with Lincoln Square Productions and Break Thru Films	
2021	Burros	Jefferson Stein	—N/a	with Ten to the Six Pictures and Artless Media	
2022	La Guerra Civil	Eva Longoria Bastón	—N/a	with DAZN Originals	

==== In production ====
- The Fifth Wheel (with Gloria Sanchez Productions)

==== In development ====
- Anita de Monte Laughs Last (with Searchlight Pictures)
- Attachment Parenting (with Eddie Murphy Productions, Davis Entertainment, and Amazon MGM Studios)

=== Television ===
Year	Title	Network	Notes	Ref.
2013	Ready for Love	NBC; NBC.com/Hulu	with Renegade 83 Entertainment and Universal Television	
2015–2016	Telenovela	NBC	with Tall and Short Productions and Universal Television	
2019	Grand Hotel	ABC	with BT's Fishing Team and ABC Studios	
2021	Let's Get Merried	VH1	with Blue Ice Pictures and MTV Entertainment Studios; TV movie	
2022	Gordita Chronicles	HBO Max	with Osprey Productions, Cinestar, Bons Mots Emporium Inc., Sony Pictures Television, and HBO Max Originals	
2024	Land of Women	Apple TV+	with Bambu Studios	
2025	Eva Longoria: Searching for Spain	CNN	with CNN Original Series	
2025–present	Necaxa	Star / FXX	with More Better Productions, Maximum Effort, and 3 Arts Entertainment	
2026–present	Eva Longoria: Searching for France	CNN	with CNN Original Series	

==== In development ====
- Call My Agent! (with Mediawan and Elefantec Global)
- Confessions On The 7:45 (with Lady Metalmark Entertainment, Unger Productions, 3 Arts Entertainment, and 20th Television)
- NFL Hometown Eats (with NFL Films, Alfred Street Industries, and Skydance Sports)
- Paola Santiago and the River of Tears (with 20th Television)
- Say Hello To My Little Friend (with AMC Studios)
- The Haunting of Alejandra (with Luchagore Productions and 20th Television)

== Podcasts ==
Year	Title	Host(s)	Provider	Genre	Notes	Ref.
2022–present	Connections with Eva Longoria	Eva Longoria	My Cultura Network/iHeartMedia	Guest, society, culture		
2022–present	Sisters of the Underground	—N/a	My Cultura Network/iHeartMedia	History	with School of Humans Audio Productions	
2022–present	Hungry for History with Eva Longoria and Maite Gomez-Rejón	Eva Longoria and Maite Gomez-Rejón	My Cultura Network/iHeartMedia	Food		
