= La Guerra Civil =

2022 American documentary film

- Directed by: Eva Longoria Bastón
- Written by: Bernardo Ruiz
- Produced by: Eva Longoria Bastón
- Production companies: UnbeliEVAble Entertainment; DAZN Originals
- Distributed by: DAZN
- Release date: January 22, 2022 (Sundance Film Festival)
- Running time: 102 minutes
- Country: United States
- Languages: English; Spanish

La Guerra Civil is a 2022 American documentary film directed and produced by Eva Longoria Bastón. The film depicts the rivalry of two boxers, Oscar De La Hoya vs. Julio Cesar Chavez in the 1990s.

The film had its world premiere at the Sundance Film Festival on January 22, 2022. It was released on DAZN.

The film was produced by Longoria Bastón through UnbeliEVAble Entertainment and DAZN Original, but it is not a DAZN Studios production. De La Hoya and Longoria are friends and De La Hoya asked Longoria to make the film. They grew up together.

== Reception ==
A critic describes this as a "lively look at 2 boxers", "clashing national and social identities". Rotten Tomatoes gives La Guerra Civil a 91% Fresh Rating. Another critic writes he's not a boxing fan, but the movie still impressed him. Vogue considers La Guerra Civil one of 2022's best Sundance Films.
