= Colorectal Cancer Alliance =

U.S. non-profit organization

- Founded: 1999
- Purpose: "We exist to end colorectal cancer in our lifetime. As the largest nonprofit dedicated to this disease, we empower a nation of allies who are overcoming colorectal cancer in their lives and communities. "
- Location: 1156 15th St NW, Suite 600, Washington, D.C., U.S.
- Origins: Washington, D.C., U.S.
- Region served: United States
- Method: Patient support, Cancer research, public policy, education and prevention.
- Key people: Michael Sapienza, Chief Executive Officer; John Woerner, Chair, Board of Directors; Avi Benaim, Vice Chair, Board of Directors
- Employees: 49
- Website: colorectalcancer.org

Colorectal Cancer Alliance is the largest and oldest colorectal cancer non-profit organization in the US.

The Colorectal Cancer Alliance offers a variety of patient support services including grant programs, monthly webinars, a helpline, chat forum and a Buddy Program, which provides both survivors and caregivers with a chance to connect with someone who has gone through a similar experience. The organization serves as a source of information about colorectal health. The Colorectal Cancer Alliance also distributes colorectal cancer awareness merchandise and printed materials.

The organization received its sixth straight 4-star rating from Charity Navigator, and maintains the 'Accredited Charity' status from the Better Business Bureau. The organization is tax-exempt under section 501(c)(3) of the Internal Revenue Code. It is eligible to receive contributions deductible as charitable donations for federal income tax purposes.

== History ==
The Colorectal Cancer Alliance was founded on March 18, 1999, as the Colon Cancer Alliance, after being incorporated in the state of Delaware. Its foundation was the result of a group of 41 survivors, caregivers and friends "who saw the need to educate the public about colon cancer and provide support to those affected by the disease."

The organization's first annual meeting occurred in Washington, D.C., after which a new board of directors took office.

In early 2016, the Colon Cancer Alliance merged with the Chris4Life Colon Cancer Foundation, a research-focused colon cancer nonprofit organization founded in 2010. After the merger, the Colon Cancer Alliance retained its name, and became the largest colorectal cancer-focused nonprofit organization in the United States.

As of November 1, 2017, the foundation was officially re-branded as the Colorectal Cancer Alliance.

== Programs and services ==
The Colorectal Cancer Alliance provides services in the areas of patient and family support, research funding and prevention efforts. The organization also promotes the National Colorectal Cancer Awareness Month observed in March of every year, and the Dress in Blue Day, held on the first Friday of every March.
