= The Fifth Wheel (upcoming film) =

American comedy film

- Directed by: Eva Longoria
- Screenplay by: Paula Pell; Janine Brito
- Produced by: Kim Kardashian; Paula Pell; Jessica Elbaum; Will Ferrell; Cris Abrego
- Starring: Kim Kardashian; Nikki Glaser; Brenda Song; Fortune Feimster; Jack Whitehall; Will Ferrell
- Production companies: Gloria Sanchez Productions; Hyphenate Media Group
- Distributed by: Netflix
- Country: United States
- Language: English

The Fifth Wheel is an upcoming American comedy film produced by and starring Kim Kardashian. It is set to be directed by Eva Longoria and written by Paula Pell and Janine Brito with Pell also producing. The film will be released on Netflix.

== Cast ==
- Kim Kardashian
- Nikki Glaser
- Brenda Song
- Fortune Feimster
- Jack Whitehall
- Casey Wilson
- Scott MacArthur
- Will Ferrell as Brad La Cadabra, a magician

== Production ==
In November 2023, Deadline Hollywood reported there was a competitive market for a Kim Kardashian and Paula Pell produced comedy film written by Pell and Janine Brito, and starring Kardashian alongside a female ensemble cast. On November 26, 2023, after multiple bids from five studios, Netflix won the bid, and was confirmed to be moving forward with the film.

In May 2025, Eva Longoria signed on to direct the film with Jessica Elbaum, Will Ferrell, and Cris Abrego joining to produce.

In December 2025, Nikki Glaser, Brenda Song and Fortune Feimster joined the cast. In January 2026, Jack Whitehall, Casey Wilson and Scott MacArthur joined the cast with filming underway in Los Angeles, California. Set photos in early March 2026 revealed that Ferrell would also be a part of the cast.
