= Grand Hotel (TV series) =

2019 American drama television series

- Genre: Drama; Mystery
- Based on: Gran Hotel by Ramón Campos & Gema R. Neira
- Developed by: Brian Tanen
- Starring: Demián Bichir; Roselyn Sanchez; Denyse Tontz; Bryan Craig; Wendy Raquel Robinson; Lincoln Younes; Shalim Ortiz; Anne Winters; Chris Warren; Feliz Ramirez; Justina Adorno
- Composer: Jeff Beal
- Country of origin: United States
- Original language: English
- No. of seasons: 1
- No. of episodes: 13

Production
- Executive producers: Ken Olin (pilot only); Ramón Campos; Teresa Fernández-Valdés; Bob Daily; Bill D'Elia; Eva Longoria Bastón; Ben Spector; Brian Tanen
- Producers: Demián Bichir; Paul Kurta; Robert D. Simon; Sara Saedi
- Cinematography: Yasu Tanida; Alison Kelly
- Editors: Kristin Windell; Troy Takaki; Rebekah Fridman; Craig Bench; L. B. Brodie; Katheryn Rupert
- Running time: 42–43 minutes
- Production companies: UnbeliEVAble Entertainment; BT's Fishing Team; ABC Studios

Original release
- Network: ABC
- Release: June 17 – September 9, 2019

Related
- El hotel de los secretos

Grand Hotel is an American mystery drama television series developed by Brian Tanen, based on the Spanish television series Gran Hotel created by Ramón Campos and Gema R. Neira. The series aired in ABC on June 17, 2019, and stars Demián Bichir, Roselyn Sanchez, Denyse Tontz, Bryan Craig, Wendy Raquel Robinson, Lincoln Younes, Anne Winters, Feliz Ramirez, and Justina Adorno. Grand Hotel is executive produced by Ramón Campos, Teresa Fernández-Valdés, Bob Daily, Bill D'Elia, Eva Longoria Bastón, Ben Spector, and Tanen. Longoria Bastón also appears on the series in a recurring role. Grand Hotel was canceled in October 2019 after one season.

== Premise ==
Set at the Riviera Grand Hotel, the last family-owned hotel in Miami Beach, Grand Hotel follows owner Santiago Mendoza, his glamorous second wife, Gigi, and their adult children, as well as the Riviera's staff.

== Cast and characters ==
=== Main ===
- Demián Bichir as Santiago Mendoza, the patriarch of the Mendoza family and owner of the Riviera Grand Hotel, which he inherited from his late wife Beatriz. He is Javi, Alicia and Jason’s father and Carolina and Yoli's stepfather.
- Roselyn Sanchez as Gigi Mendoza, Santiago's second wife who was also Beatriz's best friend. She is Carolina and Yoli's mother and Javi, Alicia and Jason’s stepmother.
- Denyse Tontz as Alicia Mendoza, Santiago's daughter who recently graduated with an MBA from the Cornell University School of Hotel Administration and steps in to help her father manage the ailing hotel
- Bryan Craig as Javi Mendoza, Santiago's disabled playboy son who wants to take on more responsibility
- Wendy Raquel Robinson as Helen "Mrs. P" Parker, the head of staff at the Riviera
- Lincoln Younes as Danny, a recently hired waiter at the Riviera who is investigating the disappearance of his sister Sky, who worked at the hotel
- Shalim Ortiz as Mateo Aguilar, the hotel manager and Santiago's right-hand man who secretly works for the hotel's creditors
- Anne Winters as Ingrid Danzette, a pregnant housekeeper at the Riviera
- Chris Warren as Jason Parker, Mrs. P's son who is later revealed to be Santiago’s biological son. He also works at the Riviera as a waiter
- Feliz Ramirez as Carolina Renna, Gigi's self-obsessed daughter and Yoli's fraternal twin sister
- Justina Adorno as Yoli Renna, Gigi's queer daughter and Carolina's fraternal twin sister

=== Recurring ===
- Arielle Kebbel as Sky Garibaldi, a line chef at the Riviera Grand Hotel who mysteriously disappeared during a hurricane; it is implied she knows something unpleasant about Santiago's past. Sky was also Yoli's secret girlfriend prior to her disappearance.
- Jencarlos Canela as El Rey, the self-proclaimed "King of Miami" and a famous rapper hired by Alicia to help attract new business to the hotel
- John Marshall Jones as Malcolm Parker, Mrs. P's husband and Jason's adoptive father who is also the head of maintenance and facilities at the Riviera; he is diagnosed with lung cancer, following a collapse
- Matt Shively as Nelson McCormick, a concierge at the hotel who tries to blackmail Mateo over Sky's disappearance, and winds up getting hit by a truck. Mateo then kills him at the hospital to cover up his secret.
- Sabrina Texidor as Marisa, a masseuse at the Riviera who begins to have a secret romantic relationship with Yoli
- Elizabeth McLaughlin as Heather Davis, Danny's longtime girlfriend back home
- Stefanie Sherk as Dr. Sonja Grant, the hotel doctor at Riviera Grand Hotel
- Adrian Pasdar as Felix, Gigi's ex-husband and Carolina's and Yoli's father, who is currently in hiding after scamming countless investors, including Santiago, out of their life savings
- Christina Vidal as Detective Ayala, a detective in Skye’s disappearance who shows up to help Danny

=== Guest ===
- Ken Kirby as Byron, Carolina's fiancé and son of the Chinese family slated to buy the hotel; the sale and the wedding falls through after Byron learns that Carolina cheated on him with El Rey ("Pilot", "Art of Darkness", "Dear Santiago")
- Eva Longoria Bastón as Beatriz Mendoza, Santiago's late wife and Alicia and Javi's mother, whose family has owned the Riviera Grand Hotel for generations ("Curveball", "Art of Darkness", "Dear Santiago")
- Richard Burgi as Michael Finn, the arrogant owner of the Finn Hotel Group and Santiago's primary competitor ("Love Thy Neighbor", "Where the Sun Don't Shine")
- Freddie Stroma as Oliver Phillips, a former classmate of Alicia's who works for Finn as a hotel manager ("Love Thy Neighbor", "Where the Sun Don't Shine")
- Katey Sagal as Theresa Williams, the boss of the crime syndicate to which Santiago owes money ("Groom Service", "Suite Little Lies", "Art of Darkness")
- Cassie Scerbo as Vanessa Clark, a professional cheerleader with whom Jason becomes romantically involved ("Suite Little Lies", "Art of Darkness", "A Perfect Storm")
- Jessalyn Gilsig as Roxanne, Ingrid’s mom who hooked up with Javi (“A Perfect Storm”)

== Episodes ==
No.	Title	Directed by	Written by	Original release date	U.S. viewers (millions)
1	"Pilot"	Ken Olin	Teleplay by : Brian Tanen	June 17, 2019	3.69
During a hurricane, Riviera Grand Hotel's chef de partie Sky is abducted after arguing with Gigi. One month later, Gigi and her husband Santiago reveal they are selling the hotel to investors, upsetting Santiago's children Alicia and Javi. New waiter Danny begins his training under Jason, son of hotel staff director Helen Parker. That night, Danny talks with Alicia, and she gets the idea to have celebrity rapper El Rey move in to attract new customers. However, she catches him cheating with her engaged stepsister, Carolina. Gigi tries buying Alicia's silence, causing Alicia to reveal Carolina's affair to her fiancé. He attacks El Rey, but Danny breaks the altercation up, and Yoli is devastated since El Rey actually liked her more than Carolina. Hotel manager Mateo learns that he impregnated Ingrid, a maid, and insists on an abortion. Ingrid lies to Javi that the child is his, as he forgets many women he sleeps with. Danny admits that he fabricated his resume, but Helen lets him stay after he impresses Santiago. El Rey agrees to Alicia's plan, while Danny, who is secretly Sky's brother, covertly investigates her disappearance. Santiago meets with Mateo, and is reminded that he owes money to Mateo's real employer.
2	"Smokeshow"	Ron Underwood	Brian Tanen	June 24, 2019	3.16
Danny tries accessing Sky's locker, but Helen empties it first. Alicia proposes her plan to Santiago, who initially wants El Rey gone. Mateo requires $500K to extend his loan, so Santiago approves Alicia's idea. Helen fires Ingrid after catching her sleeping on the job, so Ingrid asks Javi for help. Mateo learns of this and confronts Ingrid. Gigi explains to Carolina that she makes her sister feel invisible, prompting Carolina to ask El Rey to meet Yoli. Setting the stage, an overworked Alicia is helped by Danny, who takes the opportunity to steal her ID card. During the show, Danny gets Sky's things, finding a key and news clipping about Beatriz Mendoza's death. El Rey inadvertently starts a fire. The fire disheartens Alicia, until Santiago expresses how well they bonded while planning. Gigi spins the narrative to announce El Rey's residency, prompting increased reservations. Caught snooping, Danny explains to Jason about Sky, asking for help. Danny finds Alicia's keycard and returns it. Yoli tries forgiving Carolina, but Carolina is too focused on Danny at the family dinner. Santiago makes Gigi VP of Public Relations and pays Mateo, who later finds Sky's name tag has been delivered to his office.
3	"Curveball"	Eva Longoria Bastón	Bob Daily	July 1, 2019	2.96
Discovering that Ingrid is driving Sky's car, Danny learns the women were roommates. Javi tries to help secure a promising new client for the hotel, which plays on Santiago's guilt over Javi's accident. Furious at Alicia’s overspending to satisfy El Rey's every whim, Gigi insists that she approve any new expenses. Mateo receives a blackmail letter demanding $200K, and spots a mysterious man outside his office. Gigi suspends Alicia for defying her and takes away El Rey's amenities. Jason and Danny find Sky's credit card in Ingrid's purse, and she confesses to keeping all of Sky's stuff out of sentimentality. Mateo confronts the "blackmailer", who is actually a gay man looking to proposition him. Javi lands the clients, but when Santiago overhears them mocking Javi, he kicks them out. Danny reluctantly takes a drunk Carolina back to the hotel, and Alicia thinks they slept together. El Rey threatens to leave, so Gigi and Alicia bring his mother to the hotel to shame him into behaving. Javi tells Santiago that he is going to be a father. Helen reminds Gigi that Alicia must never know the truth about her mother.
4	"The Big Sickout"	Bill D'Elia	Curtis Kheel	July 8, 2019	2.77
Javi takes a job with hotel facilities to support Ingrid. Santiago cuts the staff's annual bonuses to pay Mateo's blackmailer, triggering a sick-out that plunges the hotel into chaos. Alicia, Yoli, Mateo, and Carolina are put to work and the remaining staff are given double shifts. Alicia breaks things off with Danny over Carolina, but reconsiders after overhearing him reject Carolina's advances. Alicia and Danny kiss. Gigi entertains her old friend Victor Calloway, a magazine editor she hopes will put the Riviera on a magazine cover. Victor reveals that Gigi's fugitive ex-husband, Felix, has asked to be put in touch with her after ten years on the run. Yoli meets Marisa, a masseuse who tells Yoli she is beautiful, and asks her out on a date. Gigi tells Victor that she does not want to see Felix. When Malcolm collapses from dehydration, Helen and Jason turn on Santiago and join the sick-out. To get Helen back, Santiago confesses the truth about why he cut the bonuses, and they make peace with the strikers. Victor goes to Carolina behind Gigi's back. Danny finds the torn-up blackmail letter in Mateo's trash, and later calls his girlfriend back home.
5	"You've Got Blackmail"	Marisol Adler	Davah Avena	July 15, 2019	2.90
Santiago and Gigi learn that Ingrid is the woman Javi got pregnant. Marisa is afraid of losing her job when someone reports her for having an affair in the spa. At first unwilling to do Yoli the favor of dropping her investigation of Marisa, Alicia relents when Yoli confesses that she is romantically involved with Marisa. Mateo has Danny deliver the blackmail money with a tracking device, and both men independently learn that the blackmailer is Nelson, who gets run over by a truck while trying to escape from Mateo. Santiago invites Ingrid to dinner, but she and Javi storm out when Santiago insists she take a paternity test. Ingrid and Javi have sex in a nearby room. Santiago subsequently relents and agrees to put Ingrid up in the hotel with a blank check for expenses. Danny tells a crushed Alicia that his life is too complicated for a relationship with her. Carolina tells Gigi she believes Ingrid and Mateo have a past. Yoli is revealed to have been dating Sky prior to her disappearance. To silence Nelson, Mateo makes sure he flatlines in the hospital.
6	"Love Thy Neighbor"	Arlene Sanford	Geoffrey Nauffts	July 22, 2019	2.73
Noisy renovations at the neighboring Finn Hotel threaten Santiago and Alicia's plans for the annual charity gala at the Riviera. Marisa finds Yoli's photos and letters to Sky in her bedroom. Helen decides to take a job with the Finn, which promises a higher salary and better insurance coverage. Santiago speaks to the construction workers at the Finn and learns that illegal "shortcuts" have been taken to meet deadlines. Alicia takes Oliver, the Finn's assistant manager and a friend of hers from Cornell, as her date to the gala. Gigi secretly runs a paternity test and learns that Mateo is the father of Ingrid's baby. Ingrid is forced to tell a heartbroken Javi that he is not the father. Jason and Danny confront Yoli about her relationship with Sky. She admits to being in a relationship with Sky but swears she knew nothing about her disappearance. Santiago gets the construction shut down, and confers with Helen, who is going undercover at the Finn to protect the Mendozas. Danny breaks up with his girlfriend to pursue Alicia, only to see her kissing Oliver. Yoli dances with Marissa at the gala, coming out as gay to her mother and sister.
7	"Where the Sun Don't Shine"	David Grossman	Sara Saedi	July 29, 2019	2.95
Helen tries to sabotage the Finn Hotel by hiring inferior vendors and staff, but quits when Michael Finn, the hotel's owner, makes an unwanted sexual advance. The Finn lures the Riviera's booming Spring Break partygoers away with free alcohol, but Santiago retaliates by erecting an El Rey billboard that blocks the sun from the Finn's pool. Gigi is apologetic for her cold reaction to Yoli's coming out, but her attempt to smooth things over by throwing a "coming out party" for her daughter only makes things worse. Carolina tells Yoli she knows how to contact their father. The family worries for Javi, who is drowning his sorrows in alcohol and women. Danny overhears Oliver plotting against the Riviera, and warns Alicia, who asks to be left alone. She realizes too late that Michael has stolen El Rey from the Riviera, and breaks up with Oliver for his duplicity. A furious Santiago accepts Mateo's offer to have his people "take care of" his problems with the Finn. El Rey is partying on a balcony at the Finn when it collapses, falling on Ingrid and Javi.
8	"Long Night's Journey Into Day"	Ellen S. Pressman	Nicki Renna	August 5, 2019	2.53
Ingrid and Javi survive, but tests at the hospital reveal to the family that Javi is abusing painkillers. Having discovered that Sky was selling pills for extra money, Danny learns from a hotel employee that her main customer, Javi, may have had something to do with her disappearance. Ingrid loses her baby due to stress, bringing her and Mateo closer together. Javi resists going to rehab until Santiago confesses his guilt over the accident that took Javi's leg. Ingrid confesses to a shocked Jason that she intentionally misled Javi about her pregnancy. She also tells Jason she was with an inebriated Javi the entire night of the hurricane, which clears him of any involvement in Sky's disappearance. Gigi learns the full truth about Santiago's financial troubles from Helen, who has accidentally eaten marijuana cookies. Yoli and Carolina locate Felix, who tricks them into believing he is on the run from the FBI. They agree to hide him at the hotel. Realizing that he has become emotionally consumed by his feelings for Alicia, Danny kisses her and they sleep together.
9	"Groom Service"	Elodie Keene	Desta Tedros Reff	August 12, 2019	2.38
Alicia is ready to tell her family about Danny, but he wants to keep their relationship under wraps to prevent anyone from looking into his real identity. Jason is unhappy when Helen invites Ingrid to stay with the family, but he eventually softens to her. Santiago seeks out Teresa, Mateo's mysterious superior who lent Santiago the money. She rebuffs his request to get out of their arrangement, and is furious over both his visit and Mateo's sympathy for Santiago. The police detectives who handled Sky's case are at the Riviera to investigate the accident at the Finn, and Danny tries to avoid them. One of the detectives was paid by Mateo to drop the Sky investigation, and the other recognizes Danny and agrees to work with him to find out what happened to Sky. Yoli and Carolina ambush Gigi with Felix, who tells his ex-wife that Santiago was the person who reported him to the FBI. Teresa's minion Thomas beats Mateo and pushes him down the stairs. Danny and Alicia reveal their relationship to the family, just as Danny's ex-girlfriend Heather checks into the hotel.
10	"Suite Little Lies"	John Terlesky	Danny Fernandez	August 19, 2019	2.39
Danny is stunned to find Heather at the hotel, wanting to win him back. Alicia befriends Heather, unaware of who she is but is quite upset when she discovers Danny has been lying to her about being single. Santiago discovers Felix is at the hotel and is irate about Gigi hiding him. Theresa offers to forgive Santiago's debt if he hands Felix over to them. Santiago warns Felix to get out of town but Felix goads him into a fight by suggesting Santiago killed Beatriz. After Santiago hits him, Felix uses it to claim to Gigi how unstable he is. After various antics, Javi convinces Jason to get with a cheerleader who is part of a wedding party. Ingrid and Javi decide to keep their distance while Mateo (wanting to keep her safe) also insists Ingrid stay away from him. Danny shows his police ally a photo of Theresa, who she recognizes as a crime boss. Gigi helps Felix escape the hotel. Theresa tells Santiago she wants to stay there in her own office. Marissa confesses to Yoli that she has an illegal alien. Danny comes clean at last to Alicia about being Skye's brother and why he's there and she fires him.
11	"Art of Darkness"	Nicole Rubio	Bob Daily	August 26, 2019	2.48
Since Alicia cannot explain why she wants Danny fired, Helen lets him stay. Alicia makes it clear she does not forgive Danny for lying to her. Felix brings Gigi to a huge house as he reveals he's hidden 50 million in an account in her name. Gigi drugs Felix, getting the code to clean out the account. Santiago courts Byron as a business partner, Byron agrees on the condition Carolina apologize. When Carolina comes to do so, they end up sleeping together. Ingrid is at first jealous of Jason's new relationship with Vanessa but realizes Jason is better off without her. Santiago and Gigi offer money to Theresa to pay off the debt but she makes it clear she's still going to use the hotel for a party. Javi and Alicia track down the hidden room Beatriz used to stay in. Santiago and Gigi realize the "art show" is a cover for Theresa selling women to bidders. Danny is wearing a wire for the cops who immediately raid the party with Mateo pulling Theresa out and later killing her. Yoli tells Gigi she and Skye used to hook up in the room which makes Gigi tear it apart for something Skye must have found.
12	"Dear Santiago"	Barbara Brown	Curtis Kheel	September 2, 2019	2.24
Carolina surprises everyone by announcing she and Byron are engaged again. When Byron claims to have been cut off from his family, Carolina says she can't live a poor life at which point Byron reveals he was testing her and breaks it off. Mateo reveals he killed Theresa to Santiago but will still represent his employers. Helen discovers Malcolm's cancer has spread to his brain. She offers a vacation but he suffers a stroke and Ingrid helps Jason cope with the experience. Javi and Alicia confront Santiago and Gigi with what they know so they confess the truth: Beatriz had suffered from bi-polar disorder and had been tricked by Felix into giving away all the money. She finally killed herself with them hushing it up as a heart attack with Gigi also hiding her suicide note. Danny and Alicia end up finding the note which Skye had hidden which reveals the real reason Beatriz took her life: she had discovered that Helen and Santiago had a one night stand years before and Jason was Santiago's son. Mateo threatens Santiago with a video from the night of the hurricane which Santiago watches to see a blood-stained Gigi crying in the hotel garage.
13	"A Perfect Storm"	Bill D'Elia	Brian Tanen	September 9, 2019	2.17
Santiago’s will now includes Gigi’s daughters. Danny retrieves Sky's phone, finding a recording of Sky and Gigi before she disappeared, incriminating Gigi. Danny confronts her in a locked room, presenting the note. Santiago hears Gigi’s screams, breaks in, and attacks Danny. Gigi stops them, admitting she didn't kill Sky. Santiago reads the note, and makes allusions to the killer. Danny learns from Gigi that Malcolm overheard talk of Santiago's affair, and accidentally killed Sky, striking her in defense of Gigi. Danny refuses to report him out of respect for Jason. After Malcolm’s funeral, Santiago invites Jason to lunch, and argues with Mrs. P. over revealing his paternity. Also, Danny and Alicia go to the beach so Danny can make peace with Sky’s death and her feelings for him come back, then they kiss. Carolina tells Yoli that Felix knows of Santiago's will and is en-route. Ingrid discovers that her mother and Javi hooked up. Mateo consoles her, they hook up, and Mateo leaves to "Make one last mistake". Santiago calls wanting to tell Jason the truth, Mrs. P. opposes. He insists on speaking in person, heading downstairs, where the lights aren't working and the doors are locked. An unseen individual then shoots him in the chest and he collapses.

== Production ==
=== Development ===
On November 21, 2017, it was announced that ABC was developing an American adaptation of the Spanish TV series Gran Hotel. The pilot script for Grand Hotel was set to be written by Brian Tanen who was also set as an executive producer alongside Eva Longoria, Ben Spector, Oliver Bachert, and Christian Gockel. Production companies involved with the pilot include ABC Studios and UnbeliEVAble Entertainment. On February 2, 2018, it was announced that ABC had given the production a pilot order. On February 23, 2018, it was reported that Ken Olin would direct the pilot episode.

On May 11, 2018, it was announced that ABC had given the production a series order. Additionally, it was reported that Ramón Campos and Teresa Fernández-Valdés, producers of the original Spanish series, were joining the series as executive producers. A few days later, it was announced that the series would premiere in the spring of 2019 as a mid-season replacement. On December 12, 2018, it was announced that the series would be held back from mid-season and instead debut during the summer season with a premiere date of June 17, 2019. It was scheduled to air weekly on Mondays during the 10 PM time slot.

On October 1, 2019, Grand Hotel was canceled after one season.

=== Casting ===
In February 2018, it was announced that Roselyn Sanchez and Chris Warren had joined the pilot's main cast. In March 2018, it was reported that Demián Bichir, Wendy Raquel Robinson, Shalim Ortiz, Denyse Tontz, Anne Winters, Bryan Craig, Lincoln Younes, Feliz Ramirez, and Justina Adorno had been cast in the pilot's additional main roles. In September 2018, it was announced that Eva Longoria had been cast in a guest starring role and that Jencarlos Canela would appear in a recurring capacity. On November 15, 2018, it was reported that John Marshall Jones, Richard Burgi, and Adrian Pasdar had been cast in recurring roles. In December 2018, it was announced that Katey Sagal, Freddie Stroma, and Ken Kirby had joined the cast in a recurring capacity. Arielle Kebbel appeared in the series as Sky.

=== Filming ===
Principal photography for the pilot took place over the course of three weeks in March 2018 at the Fontainebleau Hotel in Miami Beach, Florida. After the pilot was filmed in Miami Beach and ABC picked up a full order of episodes, the cast and crew headed to Los Angeles, California, where a mini-replica of the Fontainebleau was constructed. The exterior shots shown throughout the season are still the real Fontainebleau.

== Release ==
On May 15, 2018, the first official trailer for the series was released. On December 20, 2018, a "first look" still image from the series was released.

== Reception ==
=== Critical response ===
On review aggregation Rotten Tomatoes, the series holds an approval rating of 74% with an average rating of 7.01/10, based on 19 reviews. The website's critical consensus reads, "Grand Hotel is a vivacious summer soap, gathering a glamorous ensemble of Latina talent and letting them bounce off each other in delightfully sordid turns of betrayal." On Metacritic, it has a weighted average score of 60 out of 100, based on 9 critics, indicating "mixed or average reviews".

=== Ratings ===
Viewership and ratings per episode of Grand Hotel
No.	Title	Air date	Rating/share (18–49)	Viewers (millions)	DVR (18–49)	DVR viewers (millions)	Total (18–49)	Total viewers (millions)
1	"Pilot"	June 17, 2019	0.7/3	3.69	0.3	1.84	1.0	5.53
2	"Smokeshow"	June 24, 2019	0.6/3	3.16	0.3	1.52	0.9	4.67
3	"Curveball"	July 1, 2019	0.6/3	2.96	0.3	1.47	0.9	4.43
4	"The Big Sickout"	July 8, 2019	0.5/3	2.77	0.3	1.41	0.8	4.18
5	"You've Got Blackmail"	July 15, 2019	0.6/3	2.90	0.3	1.52	0.9	4.42
6	"Love Thy Neighbor"	July 22, 2019	0.5/3	2.73	0.3	1.41	0.8	4.14
7	"Where the Sun Don't Shine"	July 29, 2019	0.6/3	2.95	0.3	1.40	0.9	4.35
8	"Long Night's Journey Into Day"	August 5, 2019	0.5/3	2.53	0.3	1.41	0.7	3.94
9	"Groom Service"	August 12, 2019	0.4/2	2.40	0.3	1.44	0.7	3.84
10	"Suite Little Lies"	August 19, 2019	0.4/2	2.39	0.3	1.41	0.7	3.82
11	"Art of Darkness"	August 26, 2019	0.5/3	2.48	0.3	1.54	0.7	3.97
12	"Dear Santiago"	September 2, 2019	0.4/2	2.24	0.3	1.45	0.6	3.54
13	"A Perfect Storm"	September 9, 2019	0.4/2	2.17	0.3	1.58	0.7	3.79
