= Eva Longoria: Searching for Mexico =

American television series

- Genre: Food, travel
- Presented by: Eva Longoria
- Country of origin: United States
- Original languages: English, Spanish
- No. of seasons: 1
- No. of episodes: 6

Production
- Executive producers: Eva Longoria; Ben Spector; Stanley Tucci; Tom Barry; Eve Kay; Jess Orr; Amy Entelis; Lyle Gamm; Jon Adler
- Production location: Mexico
- Running time: 60 minutes
- Production companies: Raw TV; CNN Original Series

Original release
- Network: CNN
- Release: March 26 – April 30, 2023

Eva Longoria: Searching for Mexico is an American travel and food television series presented by Eva Longoria, which premiered on March 26, 2023, on CNN.

The series follows actress Eva Longoria who travels around Mexico exploring its various cultures, cuisine and history. The series was originally set to be an original for CNN+. It was followed by another series hosted by Longoria, set in Spain.

== Episodes ==
Season	Episodes	Originally released	
Season	Episodes	First released	Last released
1	6	March 26, 2023	April 30, 2023

No.	Title	Original release date
1	"Mexico City"	March 26, 2023
2	"Yucatán"	April 2, 2023
3	"Oaxaca"	April 9, 2023
4	"Nuevo León"	April 16, 2023
5	"Jalisco"	April 23, 2023
6	"Veracruz"	April 30, 2023
