= Land of Women =

2024 television series

- Promotional poster
- Spanish: Tierra de mujeres
- Genre: Comedy drama; Thriller
- Created by: Ramón Campos; Gema R. Neira; Teresa Fernández-Valdés; Paula Fernández
- Inspired by: La Tierra de las Mujeres by Sandra Barneda
- Starring: Eva Longoria; Santiago Cabrera; Victoria Bazúa; Carmen Maura
- Music by: Federico Jusid
- Countries of origin: Spain; United States
- Original languages: Spanish; English; Catalan
- No. of seasons: 1
- No. of episodes: 6

Production
- Executive producers: Ramón Campos; Gema R. Neira; Carlos Sedes; Teresa Fernández-Valdés; Eva Longoria; Ben Spector; Sandra Condito
- Cinematography: Daniel Sosa; Andreu Rebés
- Running time: 42–45 minutes
- Production companies: Hyphenate Media Group; Bambu Studios

Original release
- Network: Apple TV+
- Release: June 26 – July 24, 2024

Land of Women (Spanish: Tierra de mujeres) is a comedy drama thriller television series. It was created by Ramón Campos, inspired by award-winning author Sandra Barneda’s bestselling novel. The series premiered on June 26, 2024 on Apple TV+. Following its release, Land of Women reached the platform's Top 10 list in numerous countries, including Mexico, Costa Rica, Latvia, Bulgaria, Bahamas and Peru.

== Premise ==
A woman is forced to flee with her mother and daughter to Spain after her husband disappears in the wake of his financial dealings unraveling.

== Cast ==
=== Main ===
- Eva Longoria as Gala
- Santiago Cabrera as Amat
- Victoria Bazúa as Kate
- Carmen Maura as Julia
  - Helena Ezquerro as Young Julia

=== Recurring ===
- Amaury Nolasco as Kevin
- Gloria Muñoz as Mariona
  - Carla Campra as Young Mariona
- Ariadna Gil as Montse
- Pep Anton Muñoz as Andreu
- Jim Kitson as Hank
- James Purefoy as Fred
- Ben Temple as Tony
- María de Nati

== Production ==
It was announced in August 2022 that Apple TV+ had ordered the series, which would star Eva Longoria and Carmen Maura. The series would be in English, Catalan and Spanish language.

The series began filming in Garriguella in October 2022, with Santiago Cabrera, Gloria Muñoz and Victoria Bazua cast in series regular roles, and Amaury Nolasco joining in a recurring role.

== Episodes ==
No.	Title	Directed by	Written by	Original release date
1	"Chapter 1"	Carlos Sedes	Ramón Campos; Gema R. Neira; Paula Fernández	June 26, 2024
2	"Chapter 2"	Carlos Sedes	Ramón Campos; Gema R. Neira; Paula Fernández; Marina Velázquez	June 26, 2024
3	"Chapter 3"	Ken Biller	Ramón Campos; Gema R. Neira; Paula Fernández; Marina Velázquez; Curro Serrano	July 3, 2024
4	"Chapter 4"	Ken Biller	Ramón Campos; Gema R. Neira; Paula Fernández; Marina Velázquez; Curro Serrano	July 10, 2024
5	"Chapter 5"	Carlos Sedes	Ramón Campos; Gema R. Neira; Paula Fernández; Marina Velázquez; Curro Serrano	July 17, 2024
6	"Chapter 6"	Carlos Sedes	Ramón Campos; Gema R. Neira; Paula Fernández; Marina Velázquez; Curro Serrano	July 24, 2024

== Reception ==
The review aggregator website Rotten Tomatoes reported an 90% approval rating with an average rating of 6.5/10, based on 20 critic reviews. The website's critics consensus reads, "Breezy and sunny as a trip to Spain, Land of Women is a likable and light showcase for Eva Longoria's screwball charm." Metacritic, which uses a weighted average, assigned a score of 69 out of 100 based on 13 critics, indicating "generally favorable reviews". Variety wrote in a review: "A typical Hallmark-like narrative about a city gal who moves to a small town and ruffles some feathers before finding a place for herself, Land of Women would work much better as a 90-minute film."
