= Mayday (2026 film) =

American action comedy film

- Promotional poster
- Directed by: John Francis Daley; Jonathan Goldstein
- Written by: John Francis Daley; Jonathan Goldstein
- Produced by: David Ellison; Dana Goldberg; Don Granger; Ashley Fox; Johnny Pariseau; Jonathan Goldstein; John Francis Daley
- Starring: Ryan Reynolds; Kenneth Branagh; Marcin Dorociński; Maria Bakalova; David Morse
- Cinematography: Barry Peterson
- Edited by: Jamie Gross; John Lee
- Music by: Colin Stetson
- Production companies: Apple Studios; Skydance Media; Maximum Effort
- Distributed by: Apple TV
- Release date: September 4, 2026
- Running time: 111 minutes
- Country: United States
- Language: English

Mayday is a 2026 American action comedy film written and directed by John Francis Daley and Jonathan Goldstein, and produced by Apple Original Films, Skydance Media, and Maximum Effort. It stars Ryan Reynolds, Kenneth Branagh, Marcin Dorociński, Maria Bakalova, and David Morse.

The film was released on Apple TV on September 4, 2026, and received positive reviews from critics.

== Plot ==
In 1987, US Navy Lieutenant Troy "Assassin" Kelly rescues his wingman who is unable to land on an aircraft carrier. After they safely land, he is asked to fly the SR-71 Blackbird with US Air Force pilot Major Sanders for a covert reconnaissance mission over the Soviet Union. They are intercepted by a MiG and Sanders is killed; Troy maneuvers to collide with the MiG and ejects. After he lands, he is rescued by Nikolai "Nick" Ustinov, a former KGB officer and a fan of American culture. Nick regrets his time in the KGB and hopes to help Troy and one day live in the US. Troy attempts to flee, and is rescued by Nick, who hides him from search efforts from the KGB, led by Alexander Volkov.

Troy agrees to help Nick get asylum to the US if Ustinov helps him to escape Russia. Nick takes Troy on a train, but they are identified by Russian military and are forced to jump off the train. They flee to a dacha and call the US Embassy in Moscow and are told to meet there. As they flee to Moscow, Volkov sees a record of their call. Once Troy and Nick arrive in Moscow, they visit Nick's estranged daughter Anna, but are forced from her apartment when it is attacked by Volkov's agents. At a safe house owned by Anna, she confides to Troy that she is a lesbian, which is illegal in Russia and a reason why she grew apart from her father. Nick tells Troy that he already knew, which was one of the reasons he left the KGB. Troy convinces Nick to tell Anna. Nick and Anna reconcile, with Anna leaving Ustinov a photo of her with her girlfriend and a message asking him to call her once he reaches the US.

The next morning, Troy calls to arrange his rendezvous with the embassy, but they reveal that they will not provide asylum to Nick. Despite this, Troy agrees to meet at the Embassy; unknown to Troy, Nick hears this. Feeling betrayed, Nick hands Troy to Volkov, who interrogates them both; he attempts to force them to sign a confession, with Troy being shown a memo that the US Navy knowingly exposed its shipyard workers to asbestos despite its carcinogenic effects, which affected Troy's father, but Troy refuses to sign. Nick agrees to sign but grabs a pen and stabs Volkov, and he and Troy flee and steal a mobile nuclear launcher. They reconcile when Troy tells Nick why his call sign is "Assassin": it is a joke because he fell into an open deck hatch "ass first twice", and has nothing to do with the role of an actual assassin. They flee to the airport and steal a plane (Type ATR 42), which is boarded by Volkov as they take off. Troy kills Volkov by throwing him off the plane. Troy realizes they cannot make it to friendly territory in Finland in their now-damaged plane, but they land on the USS Carl Vinson which is on manoeuvres, after Troy negotiates immunity for Nick.

After the mission, Troy testifies to Congress about the Naval memo regarding asbestos and is placed on indefinite leave from the Navy. He and Nick eat at McDonalds and talk about taking a trip across the country in Nick's RV.

== Cast ==
- Ryan Reynolds as Troy "Assassin" Kelly
- Kenneth Branagh as Nikolai Ustinov
- Marcin Dorociński as Alexander Volkov
- Maria Bakalova as Anna Ustinov
- David Morse as Harold Kelly
- Clark Johnson as Keith Hardwick
- Wendy Crewson as Karen Meadows
- Louis Cancelmi as Pete Sanders
- Josh Hamilton as Dan Hennessy
- Lovell Adams-Gray as Tomas "Boomer" Garcia
- Alex Mallari Jr. as Danny "Longshot" Bowers
- Alex Ozerov as Viktor

== Production ==
In June 2023, it was announced that an original action adventure film titled Mayday was in development for Apple TV+, with Jonathan Goldstein and John Francis Daley writing and directing as well as Ryan Reynolds (who would also produce through Maximum Effort) and Kenneth Branagh in the lead roles. In April 2024, Maria Bakalova, Marcin Dorociński, Lovell Adams-Gray and Clark Johnson were added to the cast. David Morse also joined the cast of the film.

Principal photography began in Montreal on March 4, 2024, and wrapped on May 8, under the working title Blackbird. The final stage of filming was in Budapest.

== Release ==
Mayday was released on Apple TV on September 4, 2026.

== Reception ==
On the review aggregator website Rotten Tomatoes, 83% of 106 critics' reviews are positive, with an average rating of 6.3/10. The website's consensus reads: "A spirited adventure that gets a lot of mileage from clever quips and Kenneth Branagh's extremely amusing performance, Mayday thaws Cold War tensions with good-natured aplomb." Metacritic, which uses a weighted average, assigned the film a score of 60 out of 100, based on 24 critics, indicating "mixed or average" reviews.
