= National Colon Cancer Awareness Month =

Annual health campaign

National Colon Cancer Awareness Month (USA)
- Observed by: United States
- Liturgical color: Blue
- Significance: Recognition of colorectal cancer
- Begins: Annually on March 1
- Ends: Annually on March 31
- Date: March
- Related to: Colorectal Cancer Alliance

National Colon Cancer Awareness Month is an annual celebration observed in the United States during the month of March, to increase awareness of colorectal cancer. In the United States it is organized by the Colorectal Cancer Alliance, Fight Colorectal Cancer, the Colon Cancer Coalition, and other organizations and survivor networks.

== History ==
National Colon Cancer Awareness Month (or National Colorectal Cancer Awareness Month) in the United States was first established via Presidential Proclamation, signed by then President Bill Clinton on February 29, 2000.

== Events ==
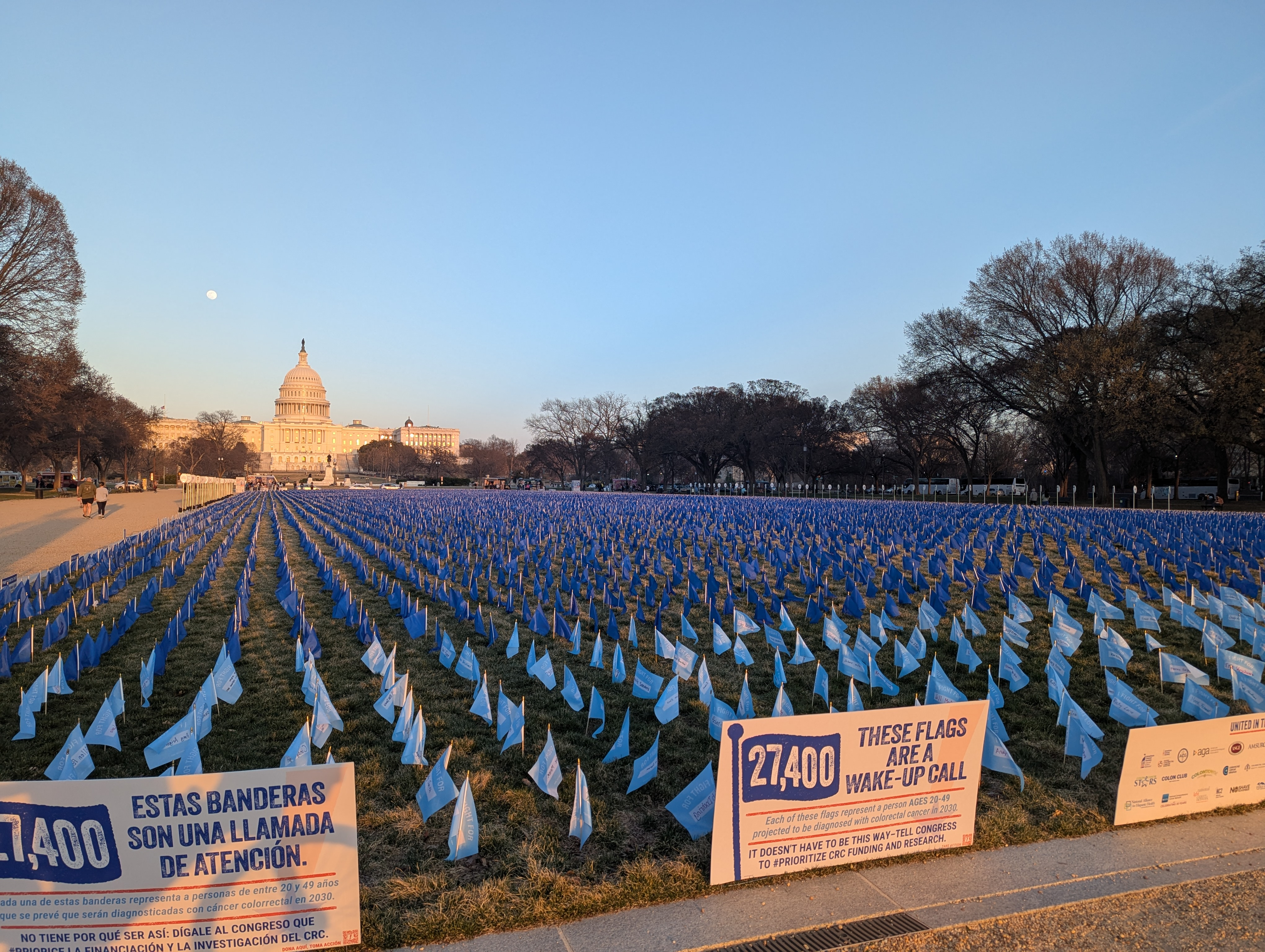
27,400 flags planted on the National Mall in March 2025, representing the estimated number of people who will be diagnosed with colorectal cancer in 2030, as part of a campaign to secure research funding for the disease

A National Colorectal Cancer Awareness Month proclamation was issued by President Barack Obama for three years between 2014 and 2016.

The manner of celebration for national colon cancer awareness month varies, but many organizations host special events to help engage their local communities in raising awareness, such as with the Dress in Blue Day promoted by the Colorectal Cancer Alliance, Blue for CRC by the Colon Cancer Coalition, and Call on Congress by Fight Colorectal Cancer.
