= Amy Entelis =

American television executive

- Born: Amy Lynn Radwell; March 10, 1951 (age 75)
- Education: Vassar College (AB); Columbia University (MS)
- Occupation: Media executive
- Spouse: Charles Entelis

Amy Entelis is the executive vice president (EVP) for talent and content development for CNN Worldwide. She leads the development, production, and acquisition of original, long-form premium content for the network. Entelis is the senior talent executive at CNN and is responsible for the recruitment and development of all on-air correspondents, anchors, and contributors for CNN programming and global platforms.

She was twice one of three EVPs appointed as interim heads of CNN—first, in February 2022, for three months, and then, again, in June 2023 for four months.

== Early life ==
Entelis was born Ami Lynn Radwell on Long Island, NY, the daughter of Jeanne and Louis Radwell. Entelis graduated from Vassar College in 1971, where she majored in psychology, and later attended Columbia University, where she earned a Master of Science in journalism.

== Career ==
=== ABC News ===
After graduation, she worked at ABC News as a producer for the weekly news magazine 20/20 and then as a producer at World News Tonight with Peter Jennings. She spent 30 years at ABC in varying roles culminating in being named senior vice president for talent strategy, development, and research where she managed the recruitment of journalists and hosts for ABC programs including Good Morning America, World News Tonight, Nightline, and 20/20. At ABC she received numerous awards including the National News Emmy, the DuPont-Columbia Award, the Front Page Award from the Newswomen's Club of New York, the Headliner Award, and the Planned Parenthood Award.

=== CNN ===
In 2012, Entelis joined CNN as Senior Vice President of Talent and Content Development. During her tenure, the network launched CNN Films to both co-produce and acquire documentary films; CNN Films Presents, to acquire and re-broadcast documentary films; and CNN Original Series to develop non-fiction series.

She has twice acted as an interim co-head of CNN. In February 2022, she and two other senior EVPs—Michael Bass and Ken Jautz—fulfilled the role for three months, following the sudden departure of CNN president Jeff Zucker, and then, again, in June 2023, following the ousting of his replacement, Chris Licht, for four months.

She is credited with shifting CNN away from a breaking news channel to a broader based one, developing programs such as Anthony Bourdain: No Reservations and United Shades of America; as well as for attaining CNN’s first Academy Award, for its Navalny documentary about then imprisoned Russian political dissident Alexei Navalny. In 2023, Entelis was overseeing documentary series and films, along with recruitment of on-air broadcast talent for CNN.

== Personal life ==
In 1971, Entelis married Charles Franklin Entelis in Malverne, New York. She resides with her family in New York City.

She serves as a member of the Board of Visitors for Columbia University Graduate School of Journalism.
