= Necaxa (TV series) =

- Genre: Documentary
- Showrunner: Alex Fumero
- Directed by: Pyongson "Sunny" Yim; Juan Baldana
- Starring: Eva Longoria; Rob McElhenney; Ryan Reynolds; Diego González; José Hanan; Alexis Peña; Diego Gómez; Emilio Lara; Diber Cambindo
- Countries of origin: United States; Mexico
- Original languages: Spanish; English
- No. of seasons: 1
- No. of episodes: 10

Production
- Executive producers: Eva Longoria; Cris Abrego; Rachelle Mendez; Rob McElhenney; Jackie Cohn; Nick Frenkel; Ryan Reynolds; George Dewey; Kevin Hill; Diana E. Gonzales; Alex Fumero
- Producer: Alex Roa
- Production location: Mexico
- Production companies: Hyphenate Media Group; More Better Productions; Maximum Effort; 3 Arts Entertainment

Original release
- Network: FXX (United States)
- Release: August 7 – September 18, 2025
- Network: Disney+ (Star Hub) (Latin America)
- Release: August 8 – September 18, 2025

Related
- Welcome to Wrexham

Necaxa is an American sports documentary television series that premiered on August 7, 2025 on FXX in the US and on August 8 on Disney+ in Latin America. The series follows Eva Longoria becoming an owner of Mexican association football club Club Necaxa and attempting to change the club's fortunes.

== Background ==
In 2021, a group of investors including Longoria, Mesut Özil, Justin Verlander, and Kate Upton purchased a 50% ownership stake in Club Necaxa.

In April 2024, Necaxa's backers purchased 5% of Wrexham A.F.C. and Wrexham's owners Rob McElhenney and Ryan Reynolds purchased a minority stake in Necaxa.

On July 9, 2024, a documentary series similar to Welcome to Wrexham was ordered from FX and Disney+ Latin America to follow Necaxa's attempt to become one of Mexico's top teams again. It stars Longoria, Mac, and Reynolds, who also serve as executive producers. Filming began on the same day with the working title Bienvenidos a Necaxa.

== Cast ==
As of August 14, 2025

Name	Role
Eva "La Patrona" Longoria	Club Necaxa Investor
Eva "La Patrona" Longoria	Executive producer
Rob McElhenney	Club Necaxa Investor
Rob McElhenney	Executive producer
Ryan Reynolds	Club Necaxa Investor
Ryan Reynolds	Executive producer
Diego "Sheldon" González	Club Necaxa Jefe De Prensa (Press Officer)
José "Pepe" Hanan	Club Necaxa Director Deportivo (Sports Director)
Alexis "El Capi" Peña	Club Necaxa Captain / Defender #4
Diego "Chili" Gómez	Club Necaxa Midfielder #19
Emilio "Pelon" Lara	Club Necaxa Defender #26
Diber "Cambi" Cambindo	Club Necaxa Forward #27

== Episodes ==
No.	Title	Original release date
1	"Welcome to Necaxa"	August 7, 2025
2	"Anxiety"	August 7, 2025
3	"The Fighter"	August 14, 2025
4	"Death"	August 14, 2025
5	"Matador"	August 21, 2025
6	"Pain"	August 21, 2025
7	"Second Chances"	August 28, 2025
8	"Back to the Future "Family""	September 4, 2025
9	"Growing Pains"	September 11, 2025
10	"Living the Dream"	September 18, 2025

== Reception ==
Jack Seale of The Guardian criticized the show for lacking stakes due to the lack of promotion and relegation in Liga MX. He writes that the series focuses on "things that would be quite nice for [Longoria]" but that these are "not enough for us to invest."
