= Beate Eriksen =

Norwegian director and actress (born 1960)

- Born: Beate Marie Eriksen; 19 October 1960 (age 66); Norway
- Occupation: Actress
- Years active: 1985–present
- Spouse: Toralv Maurstad (m. 1999; died 2022)

Beate Marie Eriksen (born 19 October 1960) is a Norwegian actress and director. Eriksen has acted at several Norwegian theatres and is known for her role in the soap opera Hotel Cæsar.

She is the granddaughter of Olympic gymnast Marius Eriksen and the daughter of World War II flying ace Marius Eriksen, Jr. She is also the niece of alpine skier Stein Eriksen and was married to actor Toralv Maurstad.

== Family background ==
Eriksen's father was Marius Eriksen, Jr., a fighter ace during World War II. After the war, Marius Eriksen became Norwegian slalom champion twice, in 1947 and 1948. His father Marius Eriksen, Sr. was a gymnast who won a bronze medal in the 1912 Summer Olympics. Marius Eriksen, Sr. was married to Birgit "Bitten" Eriksen, a pioneer in the Norwegian women's ski movement and an innovator in knitting design. Marius and Bitten's younger son Stein Eriksen was also an accomplished athlete who won a gold medal in giant slalom and a silver for slalom in the 1952 Winter Olympics.

== Career ==
Eriksen graduated from the Norwegian National Academy of Theatre in 1985. After graduating she worked for five years at Oslo Nye Teater and four years at Riksteatret. Since then she has done freelance work for Nationaltheatret (the National Theatre), The Norwegian Opera, the Norwegian Broadcasting Corporation and other establishments. She has also acted in movie and television roles, most prominently in the soap opera Hotel Cæsar. In 2000 she started working as director of the series, the first cast member ever to take on that role. She has directed 100 episodes of the show and 24 episodes of the children's television series Olsenbandens første kupp. Eriksen teaches drama at the Bærum Waldorf School and is the head of its theatre department.

== Personal life ==
Eriksen married actor Toralv Maurstad on New Year's Eve 1999, on a beach in Måløy, Norway. She was 39 and he was 73. In 2001 Eriksen's application for adopting a child was rejected because Maurstad was considered too old. Norwegian adoption rules, under most circumstances, require the age of the adoptive parents to be between 25 and 45, but Maurstad was 74.

== Filmography ==
Actress
| Year | Title | Role | Notes |
|---|---|---|---|
| 1986 | Plastposen | Nurse | |
| 1990 | Destinasjon Nordsjøen | Kari | TV |
| 1994 | Over stork og stein | | |
| 1996 | Familiesagaen de syv søstre | Valborg Løken | TV |
| 1998–2000 | Hotel Cæsar | Ingrid Iversen | TV |
| 2011 | Lilyhammer | Arnes mother | TV |

Director
| Year | Title | Notes |
|---|---|---|
| 1998 | Hotel Cæsar | TV, 100 episodes |
| 2001 | Olsenbandens første kupp | TV, 24 episodes |
