= List of One Born Every Minute episodes =

One Born Every Minute is a British observational documentary series which shows activities taking place in the labour ward. The first series aired on Channel 4 starting February 9, 2010, the second in 2011. Series 7 made its debut on 10 March 2015. This factual series is produced by Dragonfly Film and Television Productions, which is part of Shine Group.

== Series overview ==
Series	Episodes	Originally released	
Series	Episodes	First released	Last released
1	8	9 February 2010	30 March 2010
Special		25 December 2010	
2	12	10 January 2011	28 March 2011
3	14	4 January 2012	4 April 2012
4	14	2 January 2013	3 April 2013
5	10	24 February 2014	28 April 2014
6	10	11 June 2014	13 August 2014
7	7	10 March 2015	21 April 2015
8	7	22 July 2015	2 September 2015
9	9	22 March 2016	18 May 2016
10	11	4 April 2017	27 June 2017
11	10	7 March 2018	9 May 2018

== Episodes ==
=== Series 1 (2010) ===
No. in series	Summary
1	Tracy is in labour with her fourth child
2	Sam is in labour with her first child and is finding the pain unbearable
3	Lisa's baby Jack has been born with his bowel outside his body
4	Kelly is having her fifth baby. Her last one came three minutes after her waters broke.
5	Two young mums-to-be come into the hospital at the end of unexpected pregnancies
6	Two mothers are about to give birth to their first babies
7	The stories of the babies so premature or poorly they need extra care
8	Steff, 19, goes under general anaesthetic for an emergency caesarean
