= Heglund =

Heglund is a surname. Notable people with the surname include:

- Knud Heglund (1894–1960), Danish stage and film actor
- Lili Heglund (1904–1992), Danish film actress
- Nina Heglund (born 1993), Norwegian-British handball player
- Svein Heglund (1918–1998), Norwegian engineer and military officer
