= Cato Guhnfeldt =

Norwegian journalist

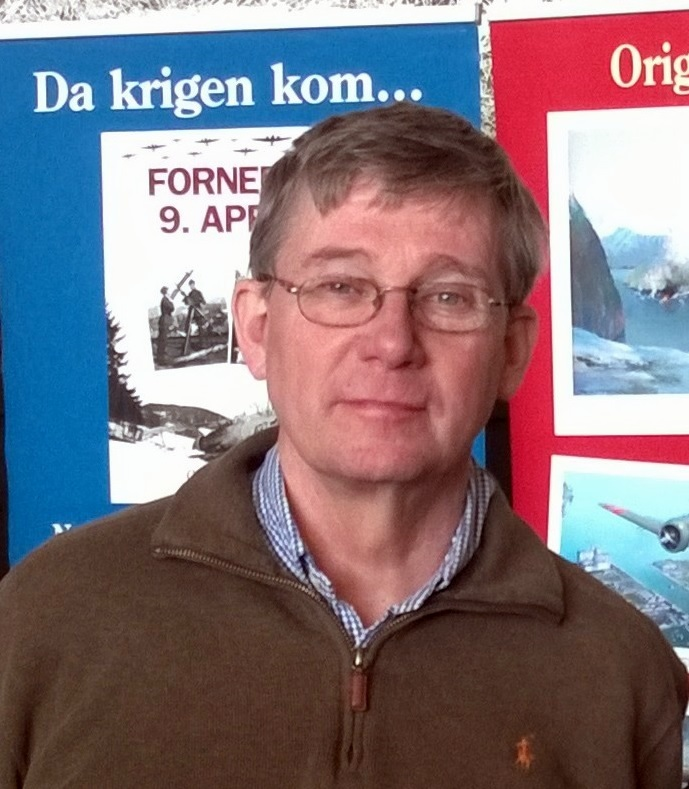
Cato Guhnfeldt

Cato Guhnfeldt (born 18 May 1951) is a Norwegian journalist in Aftenposten and non-fiction writer of Second World War history. He lives in Bærum.

Gunfeldt has a Bachelor of Arts from the University of Oslo, where he majored in political science and history. Since 1980 he has worked as a journalist in Aftenposten.

His first book was Sagaen om de norske Northrop-flyene på Island, published in 1981, about the No. 330 Squadron RNoAF while it was stationed in Iceland during the Second World War. He followed up with Fornebu 9. april in 1990, about the German invasion of Oslo Airport, Fornebu on 9 April 1940. For this and later books he established his own publishing company, Wings Forlag. Guhnfeldt's third book was Bomb Gestapo-hovedkvarteret! about the Oslo Mosquito raid on 25 September 1942. The latter two were compiled based on among other things interviews with four hundred people in seven countries. For the latter two works Guhnfeldt was awarded Fritt Ord Honor Award in 1996 for his "unique, historical authorship built upon meticulous outreaching research".

Later books include a biography of Marius Eriksen (2002), Tarald Weisteen (2004) and Gerd Vold Hurum (2006). He then wrote a series about the Supermarine Spitfire, Spittfire Saga. Two of the volumes have won the Norwegian Aviation Book of the Year, in 2010 and 2011.

== Bibliography ==
- Sagaen om de norske Northrop-flyene på Island: – og ett som ble berget for ettertiden, 1981, Sem og Stenersen. ISBN 82-7046-025-7
- Fornebu 9. april, 1990, Wings. ISBN 9788299219419
- Bomb Gestapo-hovedkvarteret!, 1995, Wings. ISBN 9788299219433
- Marius: skiløper, jageress, krigsfange: Marius Eriksens historie nedskrevet og redigert av Cato Guhnfeldt, 2002, Wings. ISBN 9788299219471
- Nattjager: fra kamp med Norges første pansertog til jakt på Hitlers flyvende bombe Tarald Weisteens historie nedskrevet og redigert av Cato Guhnfeldt, 2004, Wings. ISBN 9788299219488
- En kvinne ved navn "Truls": fra motstandskamp til Kon-Tiki / Gerd Vold Hurum; redigert av Cato Guhnfeldt, 2006, Wings. ISBN 9788299219402
- Spitfire Saga. Pionértid – Bind I, 2009, Wings. ISBN 9788299807104
- Spitfire Saga. Sommeren 1942/Dieppe – Bind II, 2009, Wings. ISBN 9788299807111
- Spitfire Saga. Full innsats – Bind III, 2010, Wings. ISBN 9788299807128
- Spitfire Saga. Mot overtak i luften – Bind IV, 2013, Wings. ISBN 9788299807135
- Spitfire Saga. 132 Wing/Invasjonen; Bind V, 2014, Wings. ISBN 9788299807142
