= Metronome Film & Television =

Swedish television production company

Banijay Nordics
- Formerly: Metronome Film & Television (1996–2014); Shine Nordics (2014–2015); Endemol Shine Nordics (2015–2020)
- Type: Division
- Industry: Television production
- Founded: 2015; 11 years ago
- Headquarters: Sweden
- Parent: Schibsted (1996–2009); Shine Group (2009–2015); Endemol Shine Group (2015–2020); Banijay Entertainment (2020–2026; 2026–present)

Banijay Nordics (formerly Metronome Film & Television, Shine Nordics and Endemol Shine Nordics) is a Nordic media production division of Banijay Entertainment specializing in film and television production through its Scandinavian production subsidiaries. In 2009, it was bought by the Shine Group for £60 million (SEK 764m), which was in turn sold to the News Corporation.

== History ==
In August 1998, Metronome Film & Television announced a partnership with Endemol that would bring Metronome's TV production activities and Endemol Entertainment's own production businesses in a far-reaching strategic alliance in the Nordic territories with Endemol taking a 35% stake in Scandinavian production outfit Metronome Film & Television as the latter merged its Swedish and Danish production units into Metronome.

In March 2015 following Shine Nordics' Shine Group merged with Dutch entertainment production powerhouse Endemol to form Endemol Shine Group a month prior in February of that year, Endemol Shine Group announced a restructuring of its Scandinavian operations by launching a new Nordic production division by renaming Shine Nordics into Endemol Shine Nordics as a new division that would handle Shine Nordics' production companies as Endemol's Norwegian, Danish and Finnish production divisions (Endemol Norway, Endemol Denmark and Endemol Finland) being merged into Shine Nordics' production units with Endemol Shine International co-CEO Gary Carter and former Shine Nordics executives Bertil Rosenlund and Victoria Kjellberg heading Endemol Shine Group's new Nordic production division with Endemol Sweden became part of the new division.

In February 2016 five years before Banijay's acquisition of Endemol Shine Nordics alongside Dutch production parent Endemol Shine Group and following Banijay's merger with Swedish/French production & distribution group Zodiak Media, Banijay placed all of its Scandinavian television production activities including Nordisk Film TV into the acquired Zodiak Nordic division and had it renamed to Banijay Zodiak Nordic as Banijay's new Nordic division with Nordisk Film TV CEO Jacob Houlind was appointed to be the new division's president as Zodiak Nordic's former president Mikael Royson became CFO of the rebranded division.

In July 2020, Endemol Shine Nordics' Dutch production & distribution parent Endemol Shine Group had been merged into French production & distribution company Banijay Group turning the latter into a global international production and distribution titan with Endemol Shine Nordics became Banijay's new Nordics division renamed to Banijay Nordics as Banijay placed all of its Scandinavian production subsidiaries such as Respirator, Yellow Bird and Jarowskij (the two were former Zodiak Media companies) into the rebranded division.

In September 2024, Banijay Nordics restructured its Swedish production operations in Sweden by merging three of its production labels, Jarowskij, Yellow Bird and Meter Television into two labels with Jarowskij's scripted division being merged with Yellow Bird to become Jarowskij/Yellow Bird which will bring together the former's script wing with Yellow Bird's and will become the drama division with Elin Kvist becoming CEO whilst Meter Television was merged into Jarowskij's unscripted division effectively becoming Meter/Jarowskij.

Metronome Spartacus produced the Norwegian soap-opera Hotel Caesar for the Norwegian television corporation TV 2, until it was cancelled on 31 mar 2017.

Outlets under Metronome Film & Television include:

Sweden

- Stockholm-Köpenhamn
- Friday TV
- Filmlance International
- Mekaniken Post Produktion

Norway

- Rubicon TV
- Metronome Spartacus

Denmark

- Metronome Productions
- Studios (Denmark)

Finland

- Metronome Film & Television (Finland)

== Subsidiaries ==
=== Metronome Productions ===
Metronome Productions A/S
- Formerly: Metronome Records A/S (1950-1979)
- Type: Division
- Industry: Television production
- Founded: 1950; 76 years ago
- Founder: Bent Fabricius-Bjerre
- Headquarters: Denmark
- Parent: Metronome Records (1950–1979); Schibsted (1996–2009); Shine Group (2009–2015); Endemol Shine Group (2015–2020); Banijay Entertainment (2020–2026; 2026–present)
- Website: www.metronome.dk

Metronome Productions is the Danish television production division of Banijay Nordics, originally founded in 1950 as Metronome Records, a subsidiary of the Swedish company of the same name. In 1979, Metronome Records was sold to WEA with the Danish division being kept. Since then, the studio has been involved in the production of films and television series and was the longtime Danish distributor for Warner Bros. In 1996, the company was sold to Schibsted and a year later, its film production division was sold to Sandrews to become Sandrew Metronome and in 2009, Shine Group acquired the Metronome Film & Television group.

=== Banijay Finland ===
Banijay Finland
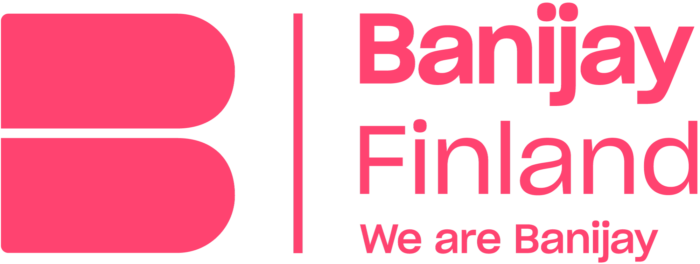
- Formerly: Shine Finland (2009-2015); Endemol Shine Finland (2015-2021)
- Type: Division
- Area served: Finland
- Owner: Shine Group (2009–2015); Endemol Shine Group (2015–2021); Banijay Entertainment (2021–2026; 2026–present)
- Parent: Banijay Nordics (2021-)
- Website: banijay.fi

Banijay Finland is the Finnish television production division of Banijay Nordics which itself is a division of French production & distribution company Banijay Entertainment.

=== Meter/Jarowskij ===
Meter/Jarowskij
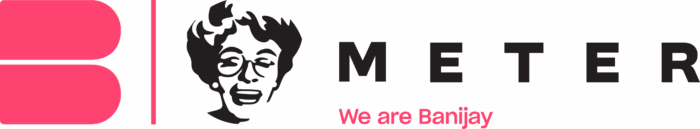
- Formerly: Meter Studios (1990–1992); Meter Film & Television AB (1992–2011); Meter Television AB (2011–2024)
- Type: Subsidiary
- Founded: 1990; 36 years ago
- Founder: Tobias Bringholm; Nicke Johansson; Michael Hagman-Eller; Anders Wåhlmark
- Owner: Shine Group (2009–2015); Endemol Shine Group (2015–2020); Banijay Nordics (2015–); Banijay Entertainment (2020–2026; 2026–present)
- Parent: Jarowskij (2024–)
- Website: meter.tv

Meter/Jarowskij (formerly known as Meter Studios, Meter Film & Television AB and Meter Television AB) is the unscripted entertainment production division of Jarowskij which is a subsidiary of Banijay Entertainment's Nordics division Banijay Nordics that creates and produce non-scripted and unscripted programming.

Meter/Jarowskij was founded as Meter Studios AB in the summer of 1990 by Tobias Bringholm, Nicke Johansson, Michael "Mix" Hagman-Eller and Anders Wåhlmark that was built as a production studio in Södra Hammarbyhamnen in Stockholm was 60% owned by the founders and the rest by other stakeholders. But two years later in March 1992, Meter Studios suffered large debts and the production company was split into two production companies namely Meter Film & Television AB whilst the debts remained in Meter Studios.

In April 2009, Meter Television alongside its production parent Metronome Film & Television had been acquired by British production & distribution company Shine Group.

==== Filmography ====
Title	Years	Network	Notes
Big Brother Sverige	2000–2021	Kanal 5/Kanal 11/Sjuan	
Sveriges Mästerkock	2001–present	TV4	
Hela Sverige bakar	2012–present	Sjuan	
Girls of Stockholm	2025	Amazon Prime Video	co-production with Amazon MGM Studios

== Former subsidiaries ==
=== Endemol Shine Finland ===
Endemol Shine Finland formerly known as Metronome Film & Television Finland and Shine Finland was the Finnish television production subsidiary of Banijay Nordics.

By October 2013, Metronome Film & Television Finland had been renamed as Shine Finland and became a division of British production & distribution company Shine Group as their own Finnish production unit with Metronome Finland managing director Tarja Pääkkönen became the permanent managing director at the rebranded production unit.

In March 2015 when Shine Finland's British parent company Shine Group merged with Dutch entertainment company to form Endemol Shine Group back in February 2015 and the announcement of Endemol Shine Nordics, Shine Finland had merged with Endemol's Finnish production division Endemol Finland and was renamed Endemol Shine Finland as the Finnish division of the newly launched Endemol Shine Finland.

In October 2019, Endemol Shine Finland expanded into the scripted production business by recruiting Max Malka as their scripted head.
