= Arne Austeen =

Norwegian World War II flying ace

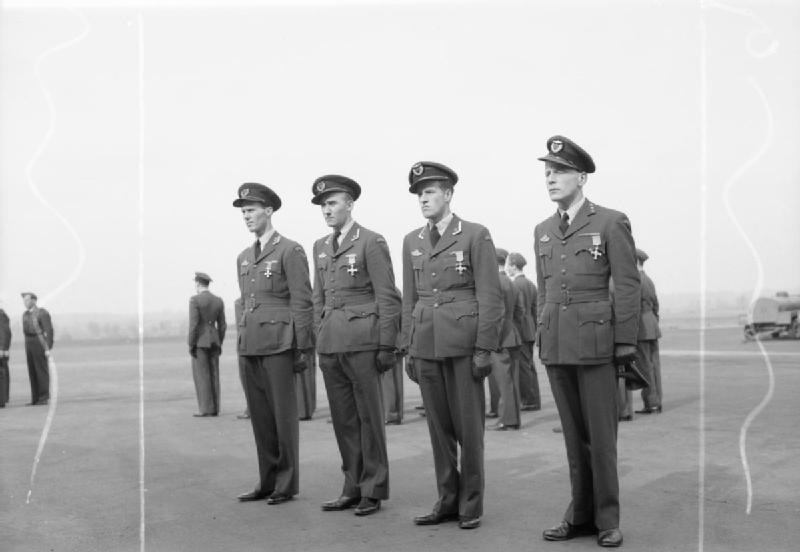
- Arne Austeen (2nd from left) was awarded the Distinguished Flying Cross together with Kaj Birksted, Werner Christie and Nils Jørstad
- Born: 1 July 1911; Stokke
- Died: May 4, 1945 (aged 33)
- Occupation: Flying Ace

Arne Austeen DFC (1 July 1911 – 4 May 1945) was a Norwegian flying ace who was killed during World War II.

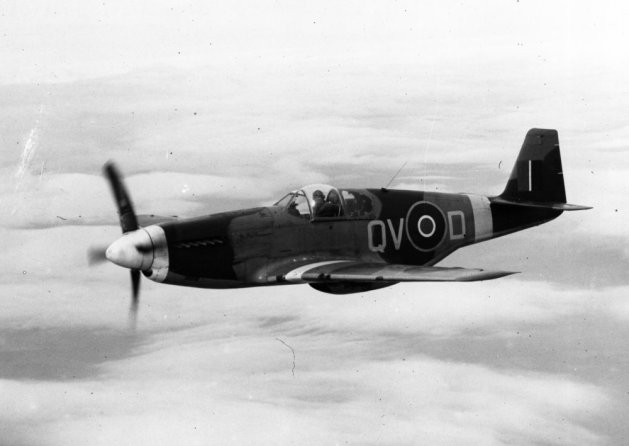
RAF North American Mustang

He was born in Stokke Municipality in Vestfold, Norway to parents from Brunlanes Municipality and Ås Municipality. He took a degree in machine engineering at the Norwegian Institute of Technology, and pilot training in the Norwegian Army Air Service. He settled in Gjøvik where he worked for Øveraasen Motorfabrikk og Mekaniske Verksted (nn).

During the occupation of Norway by Nazi Germany he fled the country during the winter of 1941. Austeen joined the Royal Norwegian Air Force training camp at Little Norway in southern Ontario. In the summer of 1942, Austeen was transferred to the United Kingdom to join the Allied aerial forces. On 14 October 1942, Austeen was decorated with the Distinguished Flying Cross. Promoted to Major, he took over leadership of the No. 331 Squadron RAF from 1 October 1943 to 15 March 1944. In the summer of 1944, Austeen was ordered to Yorkshire as chief engineer. In February 1945, Austeen returned to active service and took command of the British 126 squadron stationed at RAF Bentwaters. He was killed in action in the vicinity of Flensburg Firth during May 1945, shortly before the war's end. No trace was found of Arne Austeen or of his P-51 Mustang.

He was decorated with the St. Olav's Medal With Oak Branch, the War Medal, the Haakon VII 70th Anniversary Medal and the Distinguished Flying Cross. The road Austeens veg in Gjøvik has been named after him.

== Related reading ==
- Jefford, C.G (1988) RAF Squadrons, a Comprehensive Record of the Movement and Equipment of all RAF Squadrons and their Antecedents since 1912 (Airlife Publishing) ISBN 1-84037-141-2
- Shores, Christopher F. & Clive Williams (1966) Aces High: The Fighter Aces of the British and Commonwealth Air Forces in World War II (Shores & Williams)
