= Endemol Shine Group =

Dutch television production company

Endemol Shine Group B.V.
- Final logo used from 2016 to 2020 though EndemolShine continuing logo used for 2016 version for brand retained on production divisions part of the Banijay

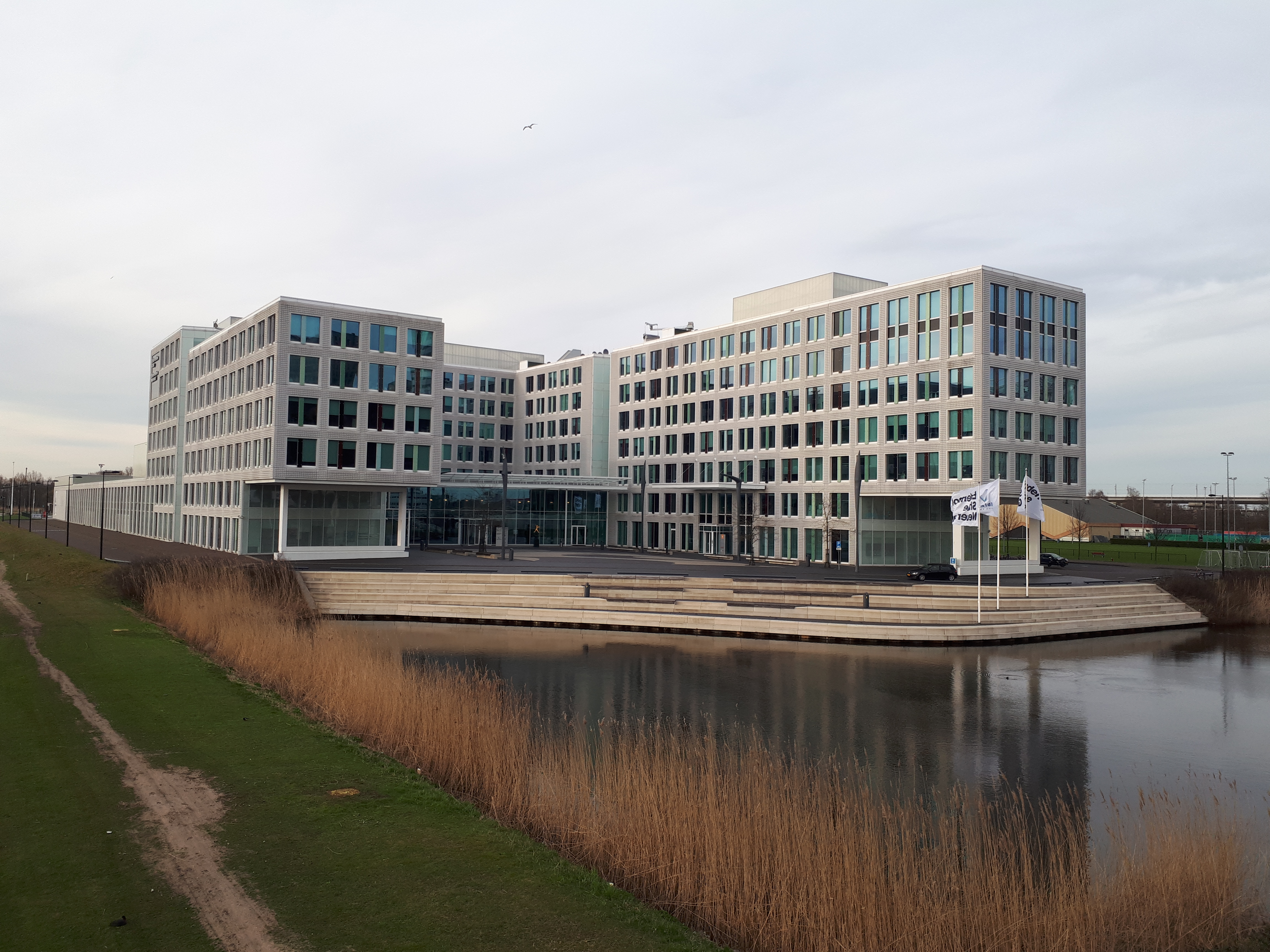
- The global headquarters of Endemol Shine Group.
- Type: In-name-only unit of Banijay Entertainment
- Industry: Television production Film distributor
- Predecessors: Endemol; Shine Group
- Founded: 1 January 2015; 11 years ago
- Defunct: 3 July 2020; 6 years ago
- Fate: Acquired by and folded into Banijay Entertainment; brand retained on production divisions and currently an in-name-only unit of the latter
- Successor: Banijay Entertainment S.A.
- Headquarters: MediArena 1, Amsterdam, Netherlands
- Key people: Sophie Turner Laing (CEO)
- Owners: 21st Century Fox (2015–2019); Walt Disney Direct-to-Consumer & International (2019–2020); Apollo Global Management (2015–2020)
- Number of employees: 6,500 (2016)
- Divisions: Endemol Shine Asia; Endemol Shine Africa; Endemol Shine North America; Endemol Shine Australia; Endemol Shine Brazil; Endemol Shine Boomdog; Endemol Shine Beyond; B&B Endemol Shine; Endemol Shine China; Endemol Shine France; Endemol Shine Finland; Endemol Shine Germany; Endemol Shine Gaming; Endemol Shine Italy; Endemol Shine Israel; Endemol Shine India; Endemol Shine Iberia; Endemol Shine International; Endemol Shine Middle East; Endemol Shine Malaysia; Endemol Shine Nordics; Endemol Shine Nederland; Endemol Shine Polska; Endemol Shine Turkey; Endemol Shine UK
- Subsidiaries: Full list of subsidiaries
- Website: endemolshinegroup.com (archived, now redirects to Banijay.com)

Endemol Shine Group B.V. (stylized as EndemolShineGroup) was a Dutch production and distribution company of scripted and non-scripted content, responsible for programmes such as Big Brother, Deal or No Deal, The Money Drop, Fear Factor, MasterChef, Mr. Bean, Your Face Sounds Familiar, Peaky Blinders, Black Mirror, Humans, Grantchester and Tin Star.

In 2018, Endemol Shine Group had 700 productions on air across 270 platforms and channels. K7 Media report's Tracking the Giants: Top 100 Travelling TV Formats 2018-19 also recognized Endemol Shine Group as the production and distribution company with the most travelled formats in 2018.

Formed in 2015 through a merger of Dutch television studio Endemol and Elisabeth Murdoch's UK-based studio Shine Group, Endemol Shine Group companies included Dragonfly, Kudos, and Princess Productions. It also included Shine TV which was founded in 2001 by Elisabeth Murdoch; and Metronome Film & Television, a Scandinavian-based production group. EndemolShine International was the group's international distribution arm responsible for the distribution of the various formats of the group. The group also established international companies Endemol Shine North America, Endemol Shine Australia, Endemol Shine India, Endemol Shine Germany, Endemol Shine France, and Endemol Shine Iberia.

From 20 March 2019 to 3 July 2020, it was jointly owned by the Walt Disney Company and Apollo Global Management, with each holding a 50% share. On 22 October 2019, French company Banijay announced its intent to acquire Endemol Shine from Disney and Apollo. On 30 June 2020, the European Commission approved Banijay's purchase of Endemol Shine. The purchase was completed on 3 July 2020. Endemol Shine Group now operates in-name-only.

== History ==
=== Merger of Endemol, Shine Group, CORE Media Group ===
On 15 May 2014, private equity firm Apollo Global Management and multinational mass media entertainment company 21st Century Fox had announced that they've confirmed its intention to merge Apollo's Dutch-based entertainment production and distribution powerhouse Endemol and American unscripted production company Core Media Group with 21st Century Fox's own British-based global entertainment production and distribution company Shine Group to form a joint venture global production and distribution company under one roof with funds managed by affiliates of Apollo, Dutch-based entertainment production and distribution powerhouse Endemol, British-based entertainment production and distribution company Shine Group and American production group CORE Media Group. Under the agreement, 21st Century Fox and the funds managed by affiliates of Apollo would jointly own and manage the new joint venture.

Five months later on 10 October 2014, 21st Century Fox and Apollo Global Management had announced that they've finalised their agreement to merge Apollo's Dutch-based entertainment production and distribution company Endemol and American production group CORE Media Group with 21st Century Fox's British-based entertainment production and distribution company Shine Group to create the global production group consists of Endemol, Shine Group and CORE Media Group. Under the terms of the agreement, 21st Century Fox and Apollo will jointly manage the newly created group, with each owning 50 per cent. Sophie Turner Laing, former managing director of Content at BSkyB, would serve as the group's CEO.

On 27 October 2014, two weeks after making the final agreement of the new joint venture Shine Group announced that Tim Hincks would become the president of the new joint venture.

On 29 October 2014, Endemol announced that Cris Abrego and Charlie Corwin will serve as the new joint venture's North America division co-chairmen and Co-CEOs.

On 17 December 2014, 21st Century Fox and funds managed by affiliates of Apollo Global Management, LLC had announced their completion of the transaction to create the group consists of Endemol, Shine Group and CORE Media, under the previously announced terms. On that same day it was announced by Shine Group that the joint venture would be named 'Endemol Shine Group' and it was announced that Endemol's worldwide distribution division Endemol Worldwide Distribution was being merged with Shine's Group international division Shine International under Endemol Worldwide Distribution's CEO becoming president of the newly merged distribution label of the Endemol Shine Group. Both Apollo and 21st Century Fox owning 50% of the joint venture that took place on 1 January 2015.

On 15 January 2015, Endemol Shine Group announced appointing former Endemol UK CEO Lucas Church to be Chairman of Endemol Shine UK, former Endemol UK Chief Operating Officer Richard Johnston becoming CEO of Endemol Shine UK.

In March 2015 following the merger of Endemol Worldwide Distribution and Shine International into one global international distribution division back in December 2014, Endemol Shine Group announced that its global international distribution division had been given a name "Endemol Shine International" which will focus on their distribution hubs across eight counties with former Endemol CEO Cathy Payne heading the combined distribution division along with former Endemol executive Mark Lawrence heading the business in Europe alongside LA-based Matt Creasey which will head up the operations in the Americas, Asia, Australia and New Zealand. Two days later in March of that same year after Endemol Shine Group had given their international distribution division a name, Endemol Shine Group announced a restructuring of their Scandinavian operations by launching a new Nordic division called Endemol Shine Nordics with Endemol's own Nordic division Endemol Nordics being shut down and merged into Shine Nordics with CEO Michael Porseryd stepping down alongside Endemol's Scandinavian operations (Endemol Norway, Endemol Finland and Endemol Denmark) being discontinued as labels and was merged into. Endemol Shine Nordics' own production subsidiary Shine Nordics as Endemol Shine International co-CEO & former Shine Nordics chairman Gary Carter overseeing the new division alongside former Shine Nordics executives Bertil Rosenlund and Victoria Kjellberg.

In succeeding years, Endemol's eye and Shine Group's egg logos were replaced with Endemol Shine Group wordmark-only logo in closing credits of most of its-licensed shows, effectively making Endemol and Shine an in-name-only units of that company.

=== Endemol ===
Endemol was founded in 1994 by a merger of television production companies owned by Joop van den Ende and John de Mol, the name deriving from the combination of their surnames.

Endemol specialised in formatted programming that can be adapted for different countries around the world as well as different media platforms. One notable success has been the Big Brother reality television show, with versions in many countries after the initial Dutch version. Other examples include Deal or No Deal (sold to over 75 countries), The Money Drop (sold in over 50 countries), Fear Factor (sold in 30 countries) and Wipeout (sold in over 35 countries). In recent years the company has also been expanding its English language drama output with shows such as titles such as The Fall, Peaky Blinders, Ripper Street and Black Mirror in the UK and Hell on Wheels in the US. In November 2013, the company launched Endemol Beyond, an international division specializing in original content for digital video platforms such as YouTube.

=== Sale to Banijay ===
In April 2018, Fox and Apollo appointed Deutsche Bank and Aryeh Bourkoff's LionTree to handle a potential sale of Endemol Shine, following Fox's sale to the Walt Disney Company. William Morris Endeavor and Banijay had eyed an acquisition of Endemol Shine, with Banijay reported to have even entered advanced talks to buy the studio.

On 29 August 2018, the RTL Group (which owns Fremantle) withdrew its bid for Endemol Shine. In September 2018, BBC Studios, along with Discovery, Inc. and Liberty Global (which each own 50% of All3Media) announced that they would not bid on the studio. ITV plc provisionally placed a bid on the studio but did not confirm an official bid as the sale is still only a potential scenario at this point. In October 2018, ITV plc withdrew from the auction. Sony Pictures Entertainment, DHX Media (now WildBrain) and Lionsgate also ruled out of the bidding. ProSiebenSat.1 Media (which owns Red Arrow Studios) was reported to be considered for a joint bid with Banijay, but the latter ruled itself out as well.

Endemol Shine later made a statement that they had been in negotiations with several parties and were confident they would have an owner by end of November 2018. However, on 6 November 2018 it was reported that both Fox and Apollo have decided to suspend the selling process as a deal could not be reached by prospective buyers. In the meantime, Fox's 50% stake in the company was given to Disney. The report was published hours before European Commission's clearance of Disney's impending purchase of Fox on certain conditions.

On 22 October 2019, Banijay officially announced its intent to acquire Endemol Shine from Disney and Apollo for over $2.2 billion. On 26 October 2019, Banijay announced it has entered into a definitive agreement to acquire 100% of the equity of Endemol Shine Group. The merger was approved on 26 October 2019, pending antitrust approval.

In November 2019, Endemol Shine Group announced that they're shutting down their Chinese label Endemol Shine China along with their China-based production and developing operations in Beijing with the group decided to license their properties in that country to China-based producers.

A few days later in November of that same year, Endemol Shine Group under their German division announced that they're selling its joint-venture drama producer Wiedemann & Berg Television to Leonine Holding which the latter already brought Wiederman & Berg Film back in April that year will reunite W&B Television with W&B Film. They also announced that they're setting up a new scripted label based in Berlin and will be run by W&B Television's managing director Nanni Erben.

In February 2020, Banijay raised $2,600,000,000 in refinancing for acquiring Endemol Shine.

On 30 June 2020, the European Commission approved Banijay's purchase of Endemol Shine. The purchase was completed three days later, and Endemol Shine was folded into Banijay. For a year, Banijay continued to use the Endemol Shine brand for many of its production divisions.

=== Podcasts ===
In November 2021, it was announced that Endemol Shine will be moving into podcasting for the first time with a partnership with KT Studios with the aim of developing and co-producing original podcasts.

== Companies ==
=== Production ===
==== Asia ====
- Endemol Shine Asia
- Endemol Shine India
- Endemol Shine Israel
  - Reshet (33%)

==== Europe ====
- Endemol Shine UK
  - Artists Studio TV Ltd
  - Bandit Television
  - Cut & Mustard
  - Douglas Road Productions Limited
  - Dragonfly Film and Television Productions Limited
  - Darlow Smithson Productions Ltd
  - Electric Robin
  - Endemol Shine Gaming
  - Fifty Fathoms
  - House of Tomorrow
  - Initial
  - Kudos: Carryover company from Shine Group.
    - Kudos North
    - Vexed Pixie
  - OP Talent
  - Remarkable Entertainment: Carryover company from Endemol
  - Sharp Jack TV
  - Shine TV
  - Shiny Button Productions
  - Sidney Street
  - Silent Boom
  - Simon's Cat Ltd.
  - Tiger Aspect Productions
    - Tiger Aspect Drama
    - Tiger Aspect Kids and Family
    - Tiger Aspect Comedy
  - Tigress Productions
  - Wild Mercury Productions
  - Workerbee: Carryover company from Shine Group as Shine North. In 2018-11-07, Endemol Shine UK announced renaming Endemol Shine North to Workerbee.
  - Zeppotron: Formed in 2000 from a core of the writing and production team behind The 11 O'Clock Show.
    - Definitely: In 2018-09-25, Zeppotron announced the launch of its new label, Definitely.
- Endemol Shine Nordics. Carryover company from Shine Group as Shine Nordics AB. The company was formed in 2015 and incorporated and Group companies in Sweden, Norway, Denmark and Finland including Meter Television, STO-CPH Produktion, Filmlance International, Friday TV, Mag5 Content, Rubicon TV, Metronome Spartacus, Metronome Productions, Endemol Sweden and Shine Finland.
  - Metronome Productions A/S (Denmark)
  - Endemol Shine Finland: Carryover company from Shine Group as Shine Finland
  - Metronome Spartacus AB (Norway)
  - Rubicon TV AS (Norway)
  - Filmlance International AB (Sweden)
  - Meter Television AB (Sweden)
  - Mag5 Content AB (Sweden): Carryover company from Shine Group.
  - Metronome Post AB (Sweden): Carryover company from Shine Group.
  - STO-CPH Produktion AB (Sweden): Carryover company from Shine Group.
  - Endemol Shine Beyond: Carryover company from Endemol as Endemol Beyond. In 2016-04-01, Endemol Shine Beyond announced its renaming to Endemol Shine Beyond.
- Endemol Shine France : Carryover company from Shine Group as Shine France.
- Endemol Shine Germany: Carryover company from Shine Group as Shine Germany.
  - MadeFor Film: In 2020-02-25, Endemol Shine Group announced Endemol Shine Germany's new scripted label MadeFor Film.
- Endemol Shine Italy
  - YAM
- Endemol Shine Nederland
  - Simpel Media
  - NL Film & TV
  - TVBV
  - Human Factor television productions
- WeiT Media (Russia)
- Endemol Shine Poland (Endemol Shine Polska Sp. z o.o.)
- Endemol Shine Iberia: Carryover company from Shine Group as Shine Iberia. In 2015-03-12, Endemol Shine Group announced the launch of Endemol Shine Iberia.
  - Endemol Portugal
  - Shine Iberia
  - Diagonal Television
  - Gestmusic
  - Telegenia
  - Zeppelin Television
  - Tuiwok Studios
- B&B Endemol Shine (Switzerland)

==== North America ====
Are the following

- Endemol Shine North America
  - 51 Minds: Carryover company from Endemol.
  - Authentic Entertainment: Carryover company from Endemol.
  - Endemol Shine Latino
  - Endemol Shine Boomdog
  - Truly Original

=== Oceania ===
- Endemol Shine Australia: Carryover company from Shine Group as Shine Australia.
  - Endemol Shine Banks (joint venture with Imogen Banks)

==== South America ====
Are the following

- Kuarzo Entertainment
- Endemol Shine Brazil

=== Distribution ===
- Endemol Shine International was the sales and distribution branch of the group that was founded on March 2, 2015, through the merger of Endemol Worldwide Distribution and Shine International under then-CEO of the Endemol Shine Group Cathy Payne. It handles the licensing and international distribution of television formats from Endemol Shine to around 150 countries worldwide until July 3, 2020, when it was folded into Banijay Rights after Banijay's acquisition of Endemol Shine Group was completed.

=== Digital and Gaming ===
- ChannelFlip: Carryover company from Shine Group.
  - The Multiverse
  - HuHa!
- Good Catch (United Kingdom)
