= Baby boom (disambiguation) =

A baby boom is a period of high birth rate.

- Mid-20th century baby boom, often referred to as the Baby Boom
- Baby boomers, people born 1946-1964

Baby boom may also refer to:

- Baby Boom (film), 1987
- Baby Boom (American TV series), 1988
- Baby Boom (Singaporean TV series), 2003
- Baby Boom (Israeli TV series), 2014
- Babyboom (EP), 2006, Sonic Boom Six
- "Baby Boom" (song), by Magnus Uggla, 1989
- Baby Boom Galaxy, starburst galaxy
- Boom XB-1 ("Baby Boom"), a scaled-down supersonic demonstrator aircraft

== See also ==
- Boom baby, catchphrase of American basketball commentator Bobby Leonard
