= List of World War II aces from Norway =

This is a list of fighter aces in World War II from Norway. For other countries see List of World War II aces by country

Name	Kills	Awards	Notes
Aanjesen, Ola Gert	7		
Austeen, Arne	6		KIA 4 May 1945
Bache, Knut	5		KIA 7 May 1944
Berg, Rolf Arne	7	War Cross, DFC with bar	KIA 3 February 1945
Bjørnstad, Bjørn	6		
Christie, Werner	10	War Cross, DSO	POW from April 1945
Djønne, Olav	5		
Dogger, Ragnar	6		
Eriksen, Marius, Jr.	9	War Cross, DFM, SA	POW after May 1943
Fearnley, Frederik Arild Sverdrup	7		KIA 25 February 1944
Fossum, Erik Petersen	6		
Gran, Martin Yngvar	10	War Cross, DFC with two bars	
Grundt Spang, Helner Gustav Einer	11	War Cross	
Heglund, Svein	16	War Cross with two swords, DSO, DFC with bar	
Jørstad, Nils Kolbjørn	7		
Lundsten, Leif	5		KIA 9 June 1944
Mehre, Helge Olrik	6	MBE War Cross, DSO, DFC (US)	
Sognnes, Helge	6		KIA 22 June 1943
Weisteen, Tarald	9	DFC with bar	
