= Slalåm under himmelen =

- Directed by: Edith Carlmar
- Written by: Hans Christensen
- Produced by: Sverre Christophersen
- Starring: Per Christensen; Marius Eriksen Jr.
- Cinematography: Sverre Bergli
- Edited by: Sølve Kern
- Music by: Magne Amdahl
- Distributed by: Norenafilm
- Release date: May 16, 1957
- Running time: 83 minutes
- Country: Norway
- Language: Norwegian

Slalåm under himmelen (Slalom beneath the Sky) is a Norwegian drama film from 1957 directed by Edith Carlmar. The filmscript was written by Hans Christensen.

== Plot ==
Three young pilots, who have been trained abroad, return home to Norway, where they begin their professional careers.

== Cast ==
- Per Christensen as Second Lieutenant Sigurd Bakke
- Marius Eriksen Jr. as Lieutenant Colonel Eriksen
- Lisbet Bull as Gerd's aunt
- Grace Grung as the nurse
- Turid Haaland as Mrs. Riesing, Arne's mother
- Jan Halvorsen as Second Lieutenant Thor Granli
- Nils Jørstad as Lieutenant Colonel Jørstad
- Jan Larsen as Major Moe
- Irene Newermann as Sigurd's girlfriend
- Rolf Falkenberg Smith as Lieutenant Colonel Bråtland
- Synnøve Strigen as Gerd, Thor's fiancé
- Anders Sundby as Bakke senior, Sigurd's father
- Wilfred Werner as Second Lieutenant Arne Riesing
- Ingrid Øvre Wiik as Mrs. Berntsen, Riesing's neighbor
