= Sverre Solberg =

Norwegian actor (1960–2014)

Sverre B. Solberg (29 January 1960 – 9 February 2014) was a Norwegian actor.

He was born in Drøbak. He took his education at the National Academy of Theatre, graduating in 1984, and was employed at Rogaland Teater (1984–1990), Oslo Nye Teater (1990–1992) and Det Norske Teatret since 1992. He participated in several television series, notably Vestavind (1994–95), Soria Moria (2000), Fox Grønland (2001) and Hotel Cæsar (2009-2010).
