= Anette Hoff =

Norwegian actress (born 1961)

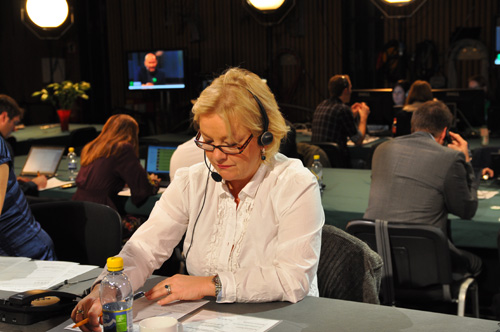
- Hoff in 2011
- Born: 16 May 1961 (age 65); Drøbak, Norway
- Occupation: Actress
- Years active: 1995–present
- Spouse: Nils-Ole Oftebro
- Children: Jonas Hoff Oftebro

Anette Hoff (born 16 May 1961) is a Norwegian actress. She has played hotel manager Juni Anker-Hansen in Hotel Cæsar since 1998. In autumn 2005, spring 2010 and autumn 2011 she took breaks to play on stage. During the 2010 break, she left the show in April 2010 (on TV) and returned in December 2010. Hoff is as of 2020 the longest serving television soap opera actor in Norway.

== Selected filmography ==
Year	Film	Role	Notes
1996	Hamsun	Ellinor Hamsun	
1998–2017	Hotel Cæsar	Juni Anker-Hansen	
