= Baby Boom (Israeli TV series) =

- Genre: Reality Television
- Based on: One Born Every Minute by Dragonfly Film and Television Productions
- Directed by: Yuval Cohen
- Country of origin: Israel
- Original language: Hebrew

Production
- Producer: Assaf Gil

Original release
- Network: Channel 10

Baby Boom (Hebrew: בייבי בום) is an Israeli reality television series which debuted in 2013 on former Israeli television channel Channel 10. The programme depicts the events leading up to a baby's birth within a hospital in the format of a docuseries. It is one of the international versions of the British television programme One Born Every Minute, which premiered three years earlier.

The series featured individual couples who had arrived at Beilinson Hospital located in Petah Tikva, Israel, and follows the full process of childbirth using cameras located throughout the facility in delivery rooms and corridors, documenting various events such as pain during labour, birth complications, and levels of paternal involvement during the process.

== Production ==
Before filming, a selection of couples who are expecting a baby in the near future is contacted and asked to participate. During the first season, the selection was determined by researchers involved in the production, mainly through the reports of gynaecologists who worked in the area. It was reported that for at least one season, ads in newspapers were published asking for pregnant individuals who were due within a certain month to apply. As part of their participation, when childbirth is imminent, the couple contacts the production team as they travel to Beilinson Hospital, where they are met by the technical team and equipped with microphones. Couples have reported being able to make requests regarding the modesty of the final footage used. Completed episodes involve interviews with each couple, and sometimes other relevant individuals, interspersed among footage of the arrival, labour process, and birth of the child.

== History ==
The first season of the show was broadcast on Channel 10 in 2013, and was produced by Assaf Gil under "Gil Productions". The first season of the show involved professor Yariv Yogev, the Director of Maternity Wards, Obstetrics, and Gynaecology departments at Beilinson Hospital from 2011 to 2015. He stated his goal in the involvement of Benilinson Hospital was to increase brand recognition for the facility. He is frequently depicted by the media as the star of Baby Boom. Beilinson Hospital reportedly invested millions of shekels after signing on for the fifth season upgrading the appearance of the maternity ward.

The second season aired November 2015 and included only four episodes. A third season aired 11 November 2015 and took place in Meir Hospital in Kfar Saba, Israel. The fifth season aired its first episode on 28 May 2018. The fifth season was delayed in filming due to low couple participation, with production noting that unless at least 50 couples agreed to participate they would not begin filming. Season five involved doctor Rony Chen, current head of the Maternity Ward at Beilinson Hospital as of 2020.

The show has featured celebrities such as Lihi Griner, a former participant on season three of the Israeli edition of Big Brother who visited one couple while at the hospital in the fifth season, and Eran Tartakovsky (a participant in Big Brother Season 4) as part of a couple from the third season.

== Reception ==
The first episode had 526,000 viewers, with a 19.9% viewership throughout Israel.

The series was controversial and was the focus of media attention regarding concerns relating to possible voyeurism and intrusion of privacy (regardless of the format of the show), the impact on the mother being filmed, how the process of birth and methods of delivery were depicted versus how they may typically take place in hospitals around Israel, and the place of the medical staff during the process of childbirth. However, it has also received praise for its strong emotional impact and ability to evoke excitement.

== Genre Determination Disputes ==
The official categorisation of the programme has been argued by Gil Productions and Channel 10 to be a pure docuseries. However, the submission of "Baby Boom" in the documentary category of the Israeli Academy of Film and Television awards was rejected, with the academy instead defining the programme as a "docu-reality" series. Gil Productions and Channel 10 withdrew their entry without resubmitting it into the suggested category, arguing that there is no intervention in the programme, and the original programme Baby Boom was based on, One Born Every Minute, had successfully won an award in the documentary category in the 2010 British Academy Television Awards, the Israeli Academy's British equivalent. It is commonly described as a "docu-reality" series, or simply as a reality television series, in published media.

== See also ==
- Israeli television
