= The Hotel (British TV series) =

- Genre: Documentary
- Starring: Mark Jenkins (2012—2015)
- Narrated by: Hugh Bonneville
- Country of origin: United Kingdom
- Original language: English
- No. of series: 4
- No. of episodes: 33

Production
- Executive producer: Simon Dickson
- Production location: United Kingdom
- Running time: 60 minutes (inc. adverts)
- Production company: Dragonfly

Original release
- Network: Channel 4
- Release: 17 April 2011 – 15 February 2015

Related
- Hotel GB

The Hotel is a fly-on-the-wall British television documentary series which ran for four series consisting of 33 episodes.

== Format ==
Unlike Hotel, a 1997 BBC docu-soap that offered similar backstage access to the Adelphi Hotel in Liverpool, the series is filmed using fixed cameras positioned in several locations around the complex rather than using a camera crew.

The second and third series of the show were broadcast in the 8pm slot on Sundays on Channel 4, and featured the same hotel, The Grosvenor Hotel in Torquay run by Mark Jenkins.

On 25 May 2014 it was confirmed the show had been commissioned for a fourth series at The Grosvenor's rival hotel, The Cavendish. Mark Jenkins appears in the show as Entertainment Manager; he worked at The Cavendish for five weeks throughout the summer of 2014. The fourth series began airing on 28 December 2014 on Channel 4 in the 8pm slot. The final episode in the series, on 15 February 2015, however, aired in the 7pm slot.

== Transmission and production ==
Series 1 consisting of eight episodes, was filmed at the Damson Dene Hotel in the Lake District over five weeks in the summer of 2010. It was first broadcast in 2011. The second series was filmed at the Grosvenor Hotel in Torquay, owned by manager Mark Jenkins. The second series ran from Sunday 1 January 2012 and aired until 26 February 2012 with 8 episodes and The Hotel at Christmas episode. Due to the popularity of the second series, a third series, also filmed at the Grosvenor Hotel, began on 30 December 2012 and also consisted of 8 episodes. These episodes were filmed throughout the summer of 2012 and as featured in the last episode of the third series, Mark Jenkins sold The Grosvenor to the Richardson Hotel Group.

In May 2014, a fourth series was commissioned by Channel 4. This was filmed in The Cavendish Hotel in Torquay throughout July and August 2014 and saw Mark Jenkins being employed by The Cavendish for five weeks throughout the summer season as their new entertainments manager. The series of eight episodes commenced on 28 December 2014 and concluded on 15 February 2015.

== Episodes ==
=== Transmissions ===
Series	Episodes	Originally aired	
Series	Episodes	Series premiere	Series finale
1	8	17 April 2011	5 June 2011
2	9	1 January 2012	26 February 2012
3	8	30 December 2012	17 February 2013
4	8	28 December 2014	15 February 2015

=== Series 1 (2011) ===
Series One consisted of eight episodes and was set at The Damson Dene Hotel in the Lake District.

Episode No.	Episode	Airdate	Viewing Figures	Channel 4 Weekly Ranking
1	The Proposal	17 April 2011	2,257,000	1
2	The Wedding	24 April 2011	1,817,000	5
3	Kids Eat Free	1 May 2011	1,872,000	8
4	Bedlam and Breakfast	8 May 2011	2,129,000	3
5	There's a Fly in My Soup	15 May 2011	1,981,000	4
6	Do Not Disturb	22 May 2011	2,127,000	5
7	Pillow Talk	29 May 2011	1,340,000	22
8	Damson in Distress	5 June 2011	1,905,000	4

=== Series 2 (2012) ===
Series Two consisted of nine episodes and was set at The Grosvenor Hotel in Torquay.

Episode No.	Airdate	Viewing Figures	Channel 4 Weekly Ranking	Summary
1	1 January 2012	2,205,000	3	The Grosvenor staff oversee the wedding of Mike and Faye despite the absence of Weddings Manager Phillip. Meanwhile, Mr and Mrs Tickle visit from Merseyside.
2	8 January 2012	1,680,000	21	Mark plans a show-biz evening of entertainment and karaoke to boost bar sales. Later life couple Wilf and Mary visit the Grosvenor to celebrate their wedding anniversary.
3	15 January 2012	1,540,000	22	Christian and Patricia holiday in Torquay with his grandchildren at the peak of the summer season. Mark frets over who to award the inaugural title of Employee of the Month.
4	22 January 2012	1,580,000	23	Mark unveils a new programme of poolside entertainment at the Grosvenor. Meanwhile, single drinking buddies David and John visit from Wales.
5	29 January 2012	<1,400,000	>30	Mark and Alison deal with the arrival of a coach party and an overbooked hotel. The Grosvenor launches a new online booking system, but with little enthusiasm from any members of staff.
6	5 February 2012	<1,530,000	>30	Mark and Christian relaunch the Grosvenor's nightclub with a midweek singles night. Two very different honeymooning couples occupy the hotel's bridal suites.
7	12 February 2012	1,500,000	26	The Grosvenor Inn restaurant finds itself with a makeover and a new chef. Meanwhile, Mr and Mrs Suttle visit the hotel on a rare family holiday with their son.
8	19 February 2012	1,791,000	9	Judy and Peter visit the Grosvenor alongside their family and friends. Mark plans a barbecue for the hotel guests but must contend with challenges from the weather.
9*	26 February 2012	1,685,000	7	Preparations are in full swing as Mark plans his first Christmas at the Grosvenor, without the help of Christian or Alison. The kitchen contends with the dietary requirements of the full house of guests for their Christmas Day meal.

* Episode 9 was a Christmas themed episode entitled The Hotel at Christmas.

=== Series 3 (2012–2013) ===
Series Three consisted of eight episodes filmed again at the Grosvenor Hotel and was announced after the success of Series Two earlier in 2012. It saw the owner, Mark Jenkins selling the hotel to The Richardson Group at the end of the series.

Episode No.	Airdate	Viewing Figures	Channel 4 Weekly Ranking	Summary
1	30 December 2012	2,479,000	5	Another summer season has started at The Grosvenor in Torquay. Mark decides to make new ways forward for the hotel by attracting posher guests through the aid of special events. Reservations manager Alison is not convinced but is soon swept along in his maverick mission.
2	6 January 2013	2,551,000	3	As Mark tries to bring the hotel upmarket he decides to invite a former AA Chief Hotel Inspector. With the hotel inspectors high standards and The Grosvenor currently failing on all accounts; the inspector couldn't have chosen a worse time to visit.
3	13 January 2013	2,473,000	6	Mark plans to launch a new 5-star breakfast, with his investment on a new gourmet sausage as the main attraction. Meanwhile, a stag party from Bristol are checking into the hotel.
4	20 January 2013	2,260,000	5	Mark and events manager Christian are still on the hunt for the strippers, for the hotels event of the season – Ladies' Night. Meanwhile, the former hotel inspector returns to check on the efforts to upgrade the hotel.
5	27 January 2013	1,993,000	5	Mark attempts to broaden The Grosvenor's horizons and attract new guests with an Indian themed night, with Indian singing and an Indian feast. Meanwhile, the hotel has some important guests, Indian millionaire Gulu and his daughter Dibna.
6	3 February 2013	1,967,000	5	Mark decides to get tougher on his staff management, and informs events manager Christian that it is about time that he has to become more cost-conscious. Tensions begin to rise when Mark finds out that Christian has made the decision to give the wedding couple the two most expensive things on the menu: duck a l'orange and pink Cava. Mark finally decides to take decisive action and asks to talk to Christian, but their meeting takes an unexpected turn.
7	10 February 2013	2,026,000	6	Mark has come to the decision that he is going to sell the hotel. Meanwhile, the reservations manager Alison's favourite family, the Fountains, make a return visit.
8	17 February 2013	2,073,000	5	Although Mark has put the hotel up for sale, the doors are still open and the staff still have their jobs, but Mark is looking for a buyer before the summer comes to an end. Meanwhile, Mark asks reservations manager Alison to step into his shoes and run the hotel. Alison is far from convinced but agrees to do it 'on a trial basis'.

=== Series 4 (2014–2015) ===
The fourth series of The Hotel began airing on 28 December 2014 on Channel 4. It sees Mark Jenkins, former owner of The Grosvenor Hotel, becoming an entertainment manager for The Cavendish Hotel for one summer season; located opposite The Grosvenor, a few metres down the road.

Episode No.	Airdate	Viewing Figures	Channel 4 Weekly Ranking	Viewing Figures (28 Days)
1	28 December 2014	2,065,000	5	2,100,000
2	4 January 2015	2,015,000	5	2,031,000
3	11 January 2015	1,835,000	8	1,919,000
4	18 January 2015	1,730,000	11	1,770,000
5	25 January 2015	1,496,000	10	1,550,000
6	1 February 2015	1,536,000	10	1,620,000
7	8 February 2015	1,563,000	10	1,610,000
8	15 February 2015	1,535,000	10	1,600,000
