= Kristin Frogner =

Norwegian actress, musician and sculptor (born 1978)

- Born: 25 February 1978 (age 48)
- Occupations: Actress, sculptor and musician

Kristin Frogner (born 25 February 1978) is a Norwegian actress, musician and sculptor. Known for her role in Hotel Cæsar, where she played the role of Charlotte Iversen/Anker-Hansen.

Kristin Frogner lived for a while in Florence, Italy, where she studied at The Florence Academy of Art. She also studied philosophy in Bali and theatre at the Royal Academy of Dramatic Art in London.

== Discography ==
2005: Just Another Girl

2009: Follow the Butterflies
