= Tordis Maurstad =

Norwegian actress (1901–1997)

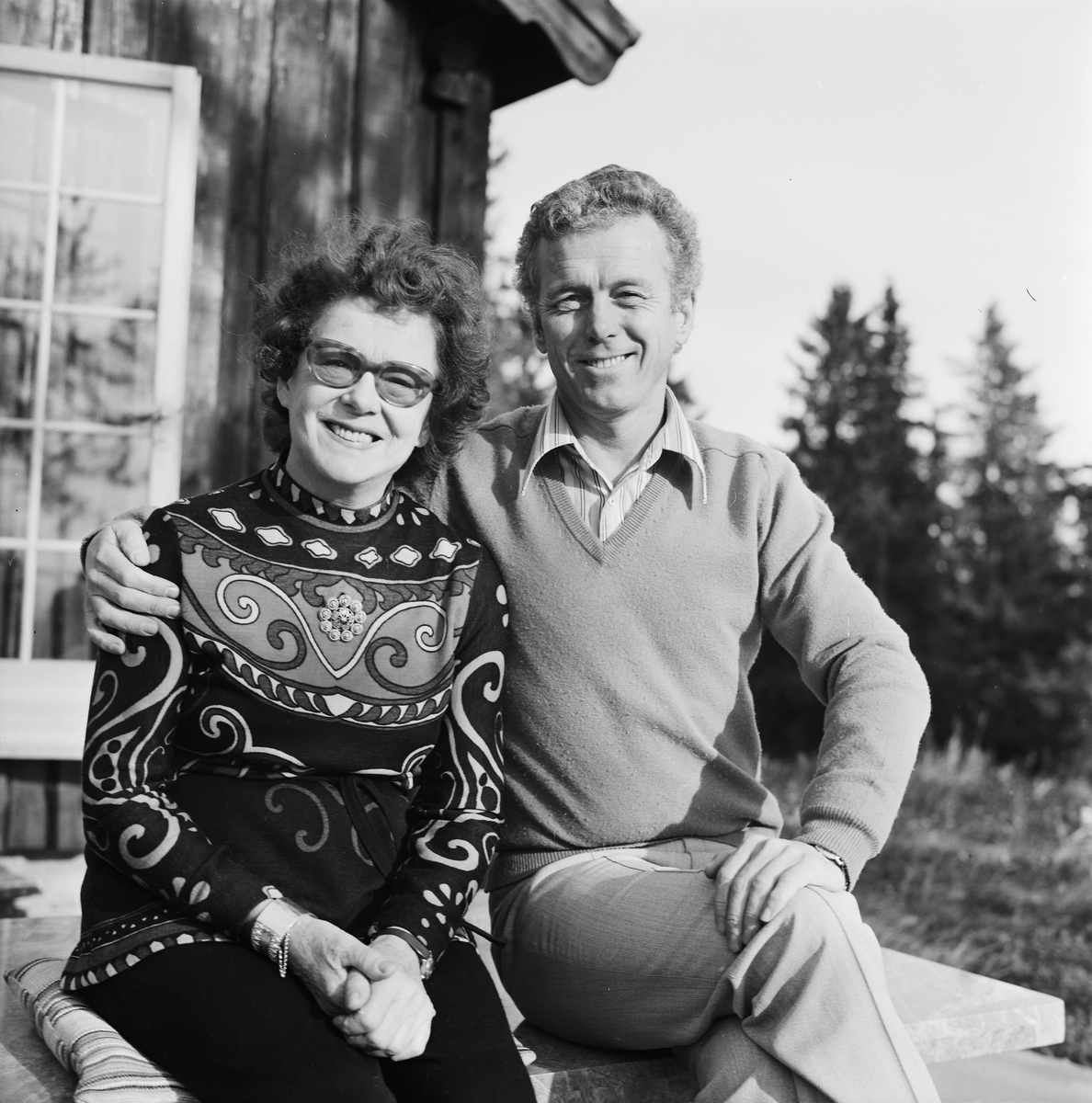
Tordis and Toralv Maurstad in 1973

Tordis Elfrida Maurstad (née Witzøe; 24 December 1901 – 10 January 1997) was a Norwegian stage actress. She was married to Alfred Maurstad, and the mother of Toralv Maurstad. She later married Helge Krog. She made her stage debut in Falkberget's play Fjellsjøheidningen in 1923. She was appointed at Det Norske Teatret in 1923, and worked at this theatre most of her career. She was decorated Knight, First Class of the Royal Norwegian Order of St. Olav in 1963.
