= Hotel Cæsar =

Norwegian soap opera

- Genre: Soap opera
- Created by: Peter Emanuel Falck; Christian Wikander
- Written by: Tom Sterri (2006-12); Arne Berggren (2012-14); Marie Hafting (2014-present)
- Starring: Anette Hoff; Kim Kolstad; Rudy Claes; Kim-Daniel Sannes
- Theme music composer: Anders Neglin
- Country of origin: Norway
- Original language: Norwegian
- No. of seasons: 34
- No. of episodes: 3,123

Production
- Executive producers: Peter Emanuel Falck; Christian Wikander; Tobias Bringholm; Ingemar Olsson
- Running time: 22 minutes

Original release
- Network: TV 2
- Release: 24 October 1998 – 14 December 2017

Hotel Cæsar is a Norwegian soap opera that aired on TV 2 from October 24, 1998 to December 14, 2017. From 1998, the show was broadcast Monday to Friday, except during the autumn of 2006, when the show was only broadcast Monday to Thursday, and from 2010 to December 15, 2016, the show was again broadcast Monday to Thursday on TV 2. From January 2, 2017, the show started broadcasting only online, through TV 2's web player, TV 2 Sumo. The show was cancelled later in 2017, and the last episode was published on TV 2 Sumo on December 14, 2017. It was created by Swedish duo Peter Emanuel Falck and Christian Wikander. The show consists of a total of 3,123 episodes, making it the longest running drama in television in Scandinavia and the second longest running drama in television in the Nordics after Finnish soap opera Salatut elämät (1999–).

== Plot ==
The storyline revolves around a fictional hotel in Oslo, its employees, and the Anker-Hansen family. CEO and widower, Georg Anker-Hansen (Toralv Maurstad) was one of the central figures in the series, and his romance with escort girl Ninni Krogstad (Henriette Lien) was the main story. After Georg died of pancreatic cancer, Ninni inherited the corporation, leading to major conflicts with Georg's dominating mother, Astrid (Sossen Krohg), and his children, Juni (Anette Hoff), Jens August (Kim Kolstad), and Julie (Elin Sogn).

The series was mostly inspired by the history of Janni Spies, who married the much older Danish tourism king Simon Spies and inherited millions when he died. It gave the idea to hotel owner Georg Anker-Hansen and escort girl Ninni Krogstad.

Georg's daughter Juni, due to her alcoholism, was also a central character in the beginning and received great attention in Norwegian media. The show gained even more attention when half-siblings Jens-August (Kim Kolstad) and Charlotte Iversen (Kristin Frogner) began a relationship without knowing that they were siblings.

Later, the series focused on controversial topics such as racism, kidnapping, rape, abortion, trafficking, drugs, pyromania, homosexuality, murder, and more.

In episode No. 1000 of the series, which aired in autumn 2004, Toralv Maurstad made a guest appearance as Georg in some of the characters' dreams.

In January 2006, the series changed its genre and appeared as a more innovative and modern soap opera with more action, humor, sex, violence, and drama. The show received massive media publicity due to its controversial content and early prime time. However, after the sudden change, viewing rates decreased, and as of January 2007, the show gradually returned to its old style.

Years later, it was discovered that Georg's deceased wife, Ingeborg Anker-Hansen, had an affair with Harald Hilldring, which resulted in the birth of Julie Anker-Hansen, who was the artist and outsider of the family. Julie learned about this through her mother's diaries. She also claimed that Georg was responsible for her mother's illness and, among her siblings, was the one who had the smallest problem opposing her family's opinions.

At the start of the series, Jens August came out of prison after serving time for murdering a man who was driving under the influence of alcohol. He also had a past with his father's new girlfriend, Ninni, and their relationship was always tense.

In the summer cliffhanger of 2007, Jens August returned to the series after being deserted on an island for two years. The plane was sabotaged by an assassin sent by Scott Wallace, the brother of Rolv Espevoll, who was introduced to the Anker-Hansens in 1998. Rolv had a brief affair with Juni during his four years of working at the hotel. In 2002, he was set up for a murder, found guilty, and sent to prison. He was released in 2006 and, within a short time, with his brother Scott, kicked out the Anker-Hansens from the hotel and their own concern. Throughout the few months they were in charge, Scott and Rolv developed a tense and hateful relationship. After some tense weeks, Scott wanted to get rid of Rolv and planted a bag of cocaine in his hotel room. Since Rolv had recently been released from jail, this was a crucial move from Scott. After an anonymous call by him to the police, Rolv was arrested and was most likely to be convicted for possession of an illegal substance. Rolv discovered that Scott had framed him. On the day of his trial, he ran off from the court. He visited Juni at Ankerseteren, gagged her, stole a rifle, and ran down to the hotel, where he started shooting in the lobby. He killed 20 people, including two people who were also holding weapons. Daphne wanted revenge on her ex for leaving her. When she pointed the gun at him, Rolv waited behind and shot her. The other one wielding a weapon was Julian, who was threatening his girlfriend, Benedicte, who he had molested recently. Rolv ran into Julian and Benedicte when Julian was about to shoot her. In a cheeky manner, Rolv pointed the rifle at Julian, asking him to apologize to Benedicte for treating her badly. Nevertheless, Rolv shot Julian, who died instantly. Ironically, Rolv then saved two people from getting killed. He then went up to the office, where he pushed Scott out onto the roof and talked straight out about everything he hated about him. Scott was already shot in his arm and was unable to defend himself. Rolv killed himself in the end.

In November 2007, Juni Anker-Hansen and Jens August Anker-Hansen were about to sell Virtual Window, a project developed by businesswoman Nadia Selam-Tefari, who worked at Cæsar. Juni's boyfriend at the moment, Magnus Falsen, presented the Virtual Window to his lodge, Vox Populi, which seemed positive about the project.

Many new main characters were introduced in 2008, including Gaute Ormåsen, who came in 2nd in the Norwegian Idol in 2003. He played the role of the musician and bartender Marius Nordheim. Per Christian Ellefsen joined the cast as the businessman Tom Ivar Johansen. In addition, viewers were introduced to his two daughters, Cecilie and Cathrine.

In November 2008, Tom Ivar died of bone cancer in addition to a fall from the main staircase at Hotel Caesar, after accidentally being pushed down by his daughter Cathrine. Cathrine admitted when Tom Ivar was comatose that she hoped he would die. Cathrine felt that she was always his second daughter after Cecilie, whom he admired and loved openly.

In April 2009, Victoria Lunde, Juni's daughter, returned to the series after spending many years in Belgium. She had become an alcoholic, likely inheriting the condition from her mother. Initially, Victoria kept this hidden, but after several incidents throughout the fall of 2009, Juni realized that her daughter needed help.

In the spring of 2009, Cathrine broke away from the Anker-Hansen Group and started her own hotel chain, the Black Diamond. Jens August joined her after having a serious conflict with his family. However, he later returned to his family.

In October 2009, Jens August's wife, Liv, died when she was hit by a car. Weeks later, she appeared in Jens August's "visions." Juni's ex-husband and Victoria's father, Ragnar Lunde, also had a guest role in the autumn of 2009. He had married an Asian woman and converted to Buddhism. When he left, Victoria joined him to go to rehab in Brussels, Belgium.

In November of the same year, Jens August and Ninni's son, Georg Jr., or "Goggen," returned to Norway after being sent to boarding school in Switzerland at a young age. He later started a relationship with Runa Jørgensen, the step-daughter of his own uncle, Svein. Svein was Ninni's brother and had a rocky relationship with Goggen at the time.

In February 2010, Astrid's centenary was celebrated in the 2000th episode of the show. At the end of this episode, Astrid had a stroke, and it turned out that she had a cerebral hemorrhage. She survived, but lost her ability to speak. However, Astrid died a month later.

That spring, Juni found out that Ingeborg was not her mother, as she had thought over the years. Her real mother was her former nanny, Dagny Dallimore (who came into the series in late 2009). Before Juni was born, her family thought Ingeborg was unable to have a child. Therefore, Dagny agreed to carry Georg's baby. Astrid, Ingeborg, and Georg set it up to make Juni think she was Ingeborg's daughter. Dagny was allowed to continue meeting her daughter as her nanny. But when Astrid and Ingeborg thought Juni and Dagny were too close, they blackmailed Dagny into leaving the country. She moved to Australia, where she married a priest and had another daughter, Rose. Dagny told Juni about this. She also told Juni that Rose had a rough patch in her life and had broken off all contact with Dagny. Juni decided to go to Australia to find her. Meanwhile, Junis daughter, Victoria, had completed her treatment in Brussels and returned to Oslo in April 2010.

That spring, Cathrine's hotel chain, Black Diamond, went bankrupt as a result of the chain's investor, Elliot Hiltun, being arrested for economic crimes, resulting in all their financial assets being frozen.

In the 2010 season finale, a huge fire broke out during a family dinner at Ankerseteren. Three people, Dagny, Ragnhild, and Cecilie, were killed in the fire.

== Cast ==
=== Current cast ===
Character	Actor	Season
Juni Anker-Hansen	Anette Hoff	1998–2005, 2006–2010, 2010–2013, 2013
Ninni Krogstad	Henriette Lien	1998–2000, 2001–2003
Ninni Krogstad	Sølje Bergman	2015–2017
Birte "Bitten" Lillevik	Anne Elisabeth Kokkinn	2000, 2002, 2012, 2013, 2013–
Eva Rosenkrantz	Rudy Claes	2004–2007, 2007–
Jenny Augusta Anker-Hansen	Camilla Aanonli	2005–2006, 2007–2011, 2013, 2013–2015
Jenny Augusta Anker-Hansen	Sofie Asplin	2015–
Storm Liland Anker-Hansen	Kim Daniel Sannes	2006–2011, 2012–
Pelle Krogstad	Nikis Theophilakis	2006, 2007–
Arnfinn Lycke	Nils Vogt	2011–2015
Vanessa Nyman	Marte Sæteren	2011–2012, 2012–2014
Monica Nyman	Hilde Lyrån	2011, 2012–
Harshad Kapoor	Assad Siddique	2013–
Hilde Erichsen	Hanne Dahle	2013–
Sigrid Uldahl	Anne Marie Ottersen	2014–

=== Comings and Goings ===
Character	Actor	On screen
Bjørnar Ness	Fillip Stav	2013, 2013-
Harald Eriksen	Bjørnar Reime Erlandsen	2013–
Rahim Wasti	Junaid Khan	2014–
Rita Rasmussen	Turid Gunnes	2014–
Bingo-Bjørn	Svein Østvik	2014–

=== Former cast members ===
Role	Actors	Years	Season
Åge Nygaard	Karl Sundby	1998–2004, 2010	1–15, 27
Henning Nygaard	Stian Barsnes Simonsen	1998–2000	1–3
Charlotte Iversen	Kristin Frogner	1998-2000, 2001-2004	1–3, 9–15
Alexandra "Alex" Kvamme	Lene Elise Bergum	1998–2001, 2004–2005	1–8, 15–17
Ragnar Lunde	Nicolay Lange-Nielsen	1998–2003, 2009	1–12, 26
Victoria Anker-Hansen	Sofie Cappelen	1998–2000, 2000–2001, 2001, 2002–2004, 2009, 2010	1–4, 5–7, 9, 11–15, 26, 27
Ingrid Iversen	Beate Eriksen	1998–2000	1–3
Solrun Jensen	Gro Solemdal	1998–2000	1–5
Tove Jensen	Kimberly Larsen	1998–2000	1–5
Georg Anker-Hansen	Toralv Maurstad	1998–1999, 2004	1–3, 17
Rolv Espevoll	Tom A. Haug	1998–2001, 2005–2006	1–8, 19–22
Astrid Anker-Hansen	Sossen Krohg	1998–2010	1–24, 24–27
Harald Hildring	Anders Hatlo	1998–2001	1–8
Torill Hammerfest	Guri Schanke	1998–1999, 2000, 2003	1–3, 5–6, 13
Loke Andersen	Mathias Eckhoff (1998–2000)/Ove Christian Owe (2001)	1998–2000, 2001	1–3, 7–8
Linn Fylke	Ulla Marie Broch	1999, 2000–2001	1–2, 4, 5–6
Truls Grande	Trond Halbo	1999	3
Svein Krogstad	Tom Eddie Brudvik	1999, 1999, 2000–2008, 2008–2010	2, 3, 4–25, 25–27
Mercedes Gonzales Nygaard	Pascale Nielsen	2000	3–5
Georg "Goggen" Anker-Hansen Jr.	Tarjei Westby	2000–2005*, 2009–2012	5–19, 26–28
Benedicte Brubak	Ingrid Nordby	2000–2008	4–24
Knut Arne Olsen	Christian Strand	2000–2001	4–9
Thomas Hildring	Martin Garfalk	2000–2001	4–7
Birte "Bitten" Lillevik	Anne Kokkinn	2000, 2002, 2012	4–5, 9–11, 29
Arne Marcussen	Ingar Helge Gimle	2000–2002	5–12
Sidsel Birkeland	Henriette Fuhr Blix	2000–2001	5–9
Bob Affe	Jon Poindexter	2000–2001	5–6
Gjertrud Krogstad	Kari Simonsen	2000–2003, 2005, 2006, 2007, 2010, 2010	6–14, 19–20, 21–22, 24, 27, 27
Hans Christian Hildring	Even Lynne	2001	7–8
Martine Bratlie	Liv-Unni Larsson	2001–2002	7–12
Birger Bahr	Geir Morstad	2001	7–8
Odd Bahr	Christer Norum Buraas	2001–2002	8–11
Hugo Anker-Hansen	Per Christensen	2001–2003, 2003, 2004	8–12, 13–14, 17
Hertug Oscar von Krona	Jesper Malm	2002, 2004–2005, 2007–2008	9–10, 15–20, 24
Mads Færevåg	Dag Vågsås	2002, 2006	10–11, 21–22
Samina Zaman	Urmila Berg-Domaas	2002	10–11
Jerry Hansen	Per Kjerstad Andersen	2002–2003	12–13
Sue-Astrid Wallace	Vanessa Borgli	2003–2004	12–17
Andrine Andersen	Lisa Herstad/Rina Johnsen	2003–2004	12–15
Kofi Nelson	Samuel Noko	2003	12–14
Thomas Lauters	Max Lundqvist	2003	12–14
Harry Trulsen	Tom Sterri	2003–2004, 2005–2006	12–15, 20–22
David Mandelstam	Dagfinn Mørkrid	2003–2004	13–15
Kenneth Dahl	Daniel Karlsson	2003–2005	14–20
Andrew Blom-Gabrielsen	Andrew Raymond Barnes	2003–2011, 2012	14–28
Marianne Halvorsen	Marit Synnøve Berg	2004–2005	15–20
Cato Halvorsen	Morten Røhrt	2004–2005	15–20
May Halvorsen	Ingeborg Sundrehagen Raustøl	2004–2005	15–20
Hans Fredrik Rosenkrantz	Ole-Jørgen Nilsen	2004–2006	15–16, 17–22
Tommy Dahl	Hans Marius Hoff Mittet	2004	15–17
Christian Borchmann	Eindride Eidsvold	2004–2005	15–20
Scott Wallace	Håvard Bakke	2004–2007	17–23
Vilde Mykland	Minken Tveitan	2005–2008	18–25
Philip Guttormsen	Even Rasmussen	2005	18–20
Ellen Lavik	Maren Bergem Owe	2005, 2006–2007	19–20, 23–24
Juan Carlos Brubak	Marcus Mathias Aarnseth	2000–2001, 2002, 2003–2004, 2005–2007	4–9, 10, 13–15, 20–23
Tone Vulvnes	Malin B. Fosvold	2006, 2006, 2007	18–20, 21, 23, 24, 25
Morten Bakke	Steinar Taarn Sande	2006–2007	21–23
Liv Liland Anker-Hansen	Nathalie Tonga	2006–2009	21-–26
Bjørn Ivar Liland	Rune Svendsen	2006–2007, 2008, 2009	21–24, 25, 26
Julian Garcia	Bård Steine	2006	21–22
Thea Liland	Sofie Støren Aschjem	2006–2007, 2008, 2009	21–24, 25, 26
Daphne Flaa	Mona Fastvold Lerche	2006	21–22
Nadia Selam Tefari	Saunet Sparell	2006–2008	21–25
Jens Folden	Knut Hagamark	2006	21–22
Lillebjørn Lien	Vidar Letho	2007	24
Jesper Jackmann	Espen Sandvik	2006–2007	23–24
Anastacia Zalewska	Charlotte Grundt	2006–2007	22–23
Magnus Falsen	Lasse Lindtner	2006–2008	23–24
Jenny Augusta Anker-Hansen	Madeleine Blom	2005–2006, 2007–2011	17–23, 24–28
Fabian Dorik	Bernhard Arnø	2007–2008	24
Mattis W. Kloppen	Gaute B. Skjegstad	2007	24
Louise Fassbinder	Brit Elisabeth Haagensli	2007–2008	24
Jonas Lund Henriksen	Geir Kvarme	2007	24
Viggo Hauge	Nils Ole Oftebro	2008–2009	25–26
Marius Nordheim	Gaute Ormåsen	2008	25
Tom Ivar Hove	Per Christian Ellefsen	2008	25
Cathrine Hove Rosenkrantz	Marianne Westby	2008–2012	25–28
Cecilie Dahr Hove	Jannecke Øinæs	2008–2010	25–27
Belinda Arnø	Caroline Haddeland-Herding	2008	25
Roy Krog	Dag Håvard Engebråten	2008–2009	25–26
Amin Idris	Tarik Moussaid	2008–2009	25–26
Runa Jørgensen	Marita Traaen	2009–2013	26–29
Philip Grøgård	Patrick Børjesson	2009–2011	26–27, 27–28
Christian Torp	Martin Heede	2009–2011, 2012	26–27, 27–28, 28, 28
Andrea Skogli	Karen Sylte Hammeren	2009	26
Alexander Löw	Sverre Solberg	2009–2010	26–27
Elliott Hiltun	Stein Grønli	2009–2010	26–27
Sunita Nissen	Marianne Hatlenes Lie	2009–2010, 2010, 2011	26–27, 27–28, 29
Dagny Dallimore	Frøydis Armand	2009–2010	26–27
Hans-Herman Rosenkrantz	Espen Hana	2009–2010	26–27
Hermine Rosenkrantz	Madelaine Jansen	2009–2011, 2011–2012	26–27, 28
Mona Lizzie Olsen	Janne Formoe	2010–2011	27–28
Pål Gottlieb	Aslag Guttormsgaard	2010	27
Helga Holmberg	Siri Ingul	2010	27
Ragnhild Røed	Mona Levin	2010	27
Tom Lycke	Steinar Johansen	2011–2012	27–29
Toralf Lycke	Svein Erik Brodal	2011	28
Håkon Borgrevinck	Christian Hestø	2011	28
Klaus Kåbøl	Lars Reynert Olsen	2011	28
Lexi	Lene Alexandra Øien	2011	28
Lasse Johansen	Thomas Magnus	2011	28
Hugo Olsen Anker-Hansen	-	2011	28
Veronica Fasting	Dagrun Anholt	2011–2012	28
Otto Antonsen	Axel Aubert	2011–2012	28
Trulte Thorsen	Reidun Sæther	2011–2012	28
Inge Steen	Cornelia Børnick	2012	28
Eirik Larsen	Håkon Sigernes	2012	28
Sol Lillevik	Tina Opsahl	2012	28
Even Lier	Åsmund Tvedtenl	2012	29
Vera Krag	Tonje Larsgaard	2012	29
Rock Young	Rudi Köhnke	2012	29
Lilly Nilsen	Maria Sand Gustavson	2012–2013	29
Willy Wang	Jeppe Beck Laursen	2013–	29–
Edvin Holte	Torgeir Reiten	2013–2015	
