= Shine Group =

Group of TV production and distribution companies

- Formerly: Shine Productions (December 2006-November 2007)
- Type: Subsidiary
- Industry: Television
- Founded: 2006; 20 years ago
- Defunct: 2015; 11 years ago
- Fate: Merged with Endemol to form Endemol Shine Group; Name still in use in Portugal and Spain
- Successor: Endemol Shine Group
- Parent: News Corporation (2011–2013); 21st Century Fox (2013–2015)
- Divisions: Shine Australia; Shine America; Shine France; Shine Finland; Shine Germany; Shine Iberia; Shine International; Shine Latino; Shine Nordics; Shine Network; Shine North; Shine Pictures; Shine 360°
- Subsidiaries: Brown Eyed Boy; Bossa Studios; ChannelFlip; Dragonfly Film and Television; Filmlance International; Friday TV; HEARTLAND ApS; Kudos Film & Television; Lovely Day; Mag5 Content; Meter Television; Metronome Productions A/S; Metronome Post; Metronome Rental; Metronome Spartacus; Princess Productions; Rubicon TV; Shine TV; STO-CPH Produktion AB; Studios A/S
- Website: shinegroup.tv (archived August 2015)

Shine Group was a British international television production and distribution group with 26 production companies across 12 countries creating scripted and non-scripted content in the global marketplace.

Shine Group companies included award-winning genre specialists such as U.K.-based Kudos (drama), Dragonfly (factual), Princess Productions (entertainment and multi-genre) and Shine TV (factual and factual entertainment); U.S. producer Shine America (formerly Reveille); and Metronome Film & Television, the Nordic region’s largest production group. The group also includes Shine 360°, a group-wide ancillary and commercial rights division, Shine International, the dedicated international sales and distribution arm and unscripted formats division Shine Network.

Shine International distributed a catalogue of more than 4,000 hours of broadcast content to more than 200 territories worldwide as of the end of 2013. Internationally distributed shows from the Shine group include MasterChef (now produced in over 40 territories), The Biggest Loser, One Born Every Minute, Minute to Win It and crime drama The Bridge, which was adapted in both the U.S., and the U.K. and France in 2013.

Shine has established businesses in Germany, France, Australia, Spain and Portugal and has expanded into the children’s genre in a joint venture with Teletubbies and In the Night Garden... co-creator Andrew Davenport. Shine also has a digital and direct to consumer business through social gaming producer Bossa Studios and the online original content producers ChannelFlip.

== History ==
Shine was founded in 2001 by Elisabeth Murdoch following her departure from BSkyB the previous year.

In December 2006, Shine Productions announced that they're in advanced negotiations to acquire three British production companies Kudos, Princess Productions and Firefly Film & Television (now Dragonfly) to create a single British production powerhouse group with the three production companies will retain their brands and operate as four separate entities after the merger is completed.

In November 2007, Shine Group announced that they're finalizing a deal to acquire American independent production company Reveille Productions from its founder Ben Silverman that could expand Shine Group's operations into the United States for $200 million. A year later in February 2008, Shine Group announced that they've completed their $200 million acquisition of American production company Reveille Productions and became Shine Group's first acquisition outside of the UK with Reveille Productions being branded as Shine Group's American division along with Reveille's distribution arm being renamed to ShineReveille International as Shine Group's new international division.

In July 2008, Shine Group announced that they launched a film production joint-venture with Arnon Milchan's American-based producer New Regency which was named Shine Pictures with the venture being held by Shine Group CEO Elisabeth Murdoch and New Regency co-chairmen Bob Harper and Hutch Parker.

In March 2009, Shine Group announced that they're going to expand their businesses outside of the UK by launching their first operation in Germany and created a new German division named Shine Germany to produce German-language programming with former VP programmer of RTL 2 Axel Kuehn joining Shine Germany as their CEO alongside executive producer Holger Rettler who became their deputy CEO.

In April 2009, following Shine Group's expansion into Germany, Shine Group announced that they were further expanding their operations into Australia by establishing an Australian production division named Shine Australia with Australian TV producers, founders of Crackerjack Productions and headers of FremantleMedia Australia Mark Fennessy and Carl Fennessy will be heading Shine's Australian operations as their joint CEOs. Three weeks later on April 28 of that same year, Shine Group announced that they've acquired Scandinavian-based Nordic entertainment production powerhouse Metronome Film & Television along with their production companies from its parent company Schibsted ASA, marking Shine Group's expansion into the Scandinavian market while Metronome's CEO Matt Alters and CCO Michael Porseryd continued to remain on board under Shine Group.

In June 2009, Shine Group announced that they've expanding their operation into France by creating their new division named Shine France and had hired former Endemol France chief content officer Thierry Lachkar to become Shine France's CEO.

In August 2009, Shine Group announced that they were restructuring their international sales and distribution arm by merging their ShineReveille International division with Metronome's international sales operations along with Friday TV's distribution arm and rebranding the former company to Shine International as a new international division as part of a global expansion.

In May 2010, Shine Group along with its UK drama production house Kudos Film & Television announced that they've launched a division that would specialise in drama named Lovely Day with Diederick Santer running the new label and will operate in Kudos' London headquarters.

In June 2010, Shine Group announced that they've acquired independent comedy production company Brown Eyed Boy to boost up Shine's comedy output and expanding Shine Group's UK portfolio.

News Corporation (later 21st Century Fox, but assets are now split between The Walt Disney Company and Fox Corporation) acquired Shine Group in April 2011 for $415 million. US pension funds who are shareholders in News Corporation are suing the company accusing Murdoch of nepotism.

In June 2011, Shine Group announced that they've expanding their operations into Spain and Portugal by setting up a new regional Iberian division based which was named Shine Iberia with Macarena Rey the general director of BocaBoca Productions will be heading the new division and the division will produce local adaptations of Shine Group's programmes.

In August 2011, Shine Group announced that they're launched a group-wide global and commercial rights division which was named Shine 360º to handle their consumer products, digital brand extensions and brand-funded entertainment to Shine's properties with Ben Liebmann of Shine Australia running the new division.

In September 2011, Shine Group announced that they're entering the social gaming industry by acquiring London-based social gaming company Bossa Studios, marking the first time Shine Group had entered the social gaming operations.

In March 2012, Shine Group announced that they're launching a new unnamed children's joint venture division and had hired Andrew Davenport as their CEO of Shine's unnamed children's division.

In May 2014, Shine Group's parent company 21st Century Fox announced that they're in exclusive negotiations with Apollo Global Management who owns Dutch entertainment production and distribution company Endemol and American production company CORE Media Group into merging their three respective production companies into one joint-venture global production and distribution company under one group. The deal was finalized in October.

In September 2014, Shine Group announced that their founder and chairman Elizabeth Murdoch was stepping down her entertainment production and distribution company after when Shine Group merger with Endemol and CORE Media Group is completed.

On 17 December 2014, Shine Group announced the joint venture by 21st Century Fox with funds managed by affiliates of Apollo Global Management, LLC, combining Endemol, Shine and CORE Media Group into Endemol Shine Group. As part of the new structure, Former Endemol UK CEO, Lucas Church, has been appointed Chairman of Endemol Shine UK, whilst former Endemol UK Chief Operating Officer, Richard Johnston, becomes CEO of Endemol Shine UK.

== Programming ==
- MasterChef Junior
- The Undriveables
- Grantchester
- Humans
- Restaurant Startup
- Prodigies
- Stripped
- Anything Goes
- Arne Dahl
- Best Bakery
- Beauty and the Geek
- The Biggest Loser
- The Bridge
- Broadchurch
- Bron
- Clash of the Choirs
- The Face
- Got to Dance
- Gracepoint
- The Island
- Lilyhammer
- MasterChef
- Minute to Win It
- One Born Every Minute
- Sandhamn Murders
- Saturday Night Tube
- Secret Street Crew
- The Tunnel
- Vicious
- Utopia
