= One Born Every Minute Australia =

Australian television show

- Also known as: One Born Every Minute
- Genre: Factual television
- Based on: One Born Every Minute
- Narrated by: Jane Hall
- Country of origin: Australia
- Original language: English
- No. of seasons: 1
- No. of episodes: 8

Production
- Executive producers: Debbie Cuell; Sarah Thornton
- Production locations: Westmead Hospital, Sydney
- Camera setup: Fixed-rig cameras
- Running time: 49 minutes
- Production company: Endemol Shine Australia

Original release
- Network: Network 10
- Release: 22 October – 10 December 2019

One Born Every Minute Australia is an Australian observational docuseries that follows the births of expecting families as they prepare for labour at Sydney’s Westmead Hospital. The show, an Australian version of the UK show by the same name, was produced by Endemol Shine Australia and aired via Network 10. The show was first aired on 22 October 2019 and concluded its first season on 10 December 2019. The show consists of one season of eight episodes, with each episode having an average duration of 49 minutes. Over an eight-week period the series was filmed in Sydney’s Westmead Hospital Birthing Unit, where over 5,500 families choose to birth their babies each year. The series follows the birthing journeys of multiple women as they enter into labour, proceed into giving birth and welcome newborn babies. The show was nominated for the ASE (Australian Screen Editors) Award for Best Editing in Factual Entertainment in 2020.

== Content and plot ==
Each episode of One Born Every Minute follows a series of unrelated women and families entering Westmead Hospital to give birth. Each episode generally follows three to four families who enter the hospital while in labour. While in labour, families and doctors discuss many birth-related topics, such as birthing options and any potential birthing complications. Some background information is provided on the birth parents, as well as an overview of any previous and present pregnancies. After the mothers give birth, the series introduces the newly born child along with any other relevant post-birth information.

The series explores many aspects and themes of childbirth. Moderate birthing complications such as breech births and caesarean sections are common themes within the show. Additionally, more serious themes such as congenital birth defects, heart problems and pre and post-natal birth complications are present.

== Production and production history ==
One Born Every Minute Australia premiered on 22 October 2019. The show only has one season with eight episodes, with the final episode airing on 10 December 2019. The show was produced under Australian media company Endemol Shine Australia and broadcast via Network 10 (an Australian free-to-air commercial television network). Beverley McGarvey, chief content officer for Network 10 stated, "We have seen our audiences really embrace and enjoy an insight into the world of genuinely amazing Australians including paramedics and life-guards, so having the opportunity to now get close to the incredible and dedicated teams who help us through childbirth is not only thrilling but is a real privilege and a series we believe will be very special."

The show is narrated by Jane Hall and directed and produced by Michael Bennett, along with producers Debbie Cuell and Sarah Thornton. The series was edited by Karen Crespo. The show used footage from over 60 fixed rig cameras set up around Westmead Hospital Birthing Unit, with the aim to capture the realities of parenthood, nurses, hospital culture and relationships. One Born Every Minute Australia is the Australian version of the UK series One Born Every Minute. The original UK series was sold to several countries, where an Australian and American version of the same name, One Born Every Minute, exists.

== Audience reception ==
One Born Every Minute Australia has had an overall positive response from audiences, with 97% of Google users liking the show. The show also received positive coverage from multiple Australian media outlets, such as the Sydney Morning Herald and Hit Network. The premiering episode of the series received 325,000 metro viewers, with the series receiving 454,000 national views altogether.

== Episode list ==
No.	Title	Original release date
1	"One Born Every Minute"	22 October 2019
In the premiering episode of the series, the scene opens with a montage of births at Sydney’s Westmead Hospital Birthing Unit , where first-time parents Morgan (21) and Jaevus (24) are introduced. The couple are introduced to the audience while discussing the many anxieties of being a first-time parent. The next pregnant couple to be introduced are returning parents Joan (32) and her partner Frank (31). The couple reveal they have been together for fifteen years and are about to welcome their fifth baby. First-time mum Morgan gives birth to her daughter Neriella via a water birth. The third couple of the episode, Maya (40) and Chris (40) are introduced. It is revealed that during Maya’s pregnancy Chris has developed cancer, which has spread from his eye to his liver. As mother Joan is giving birth, the rapid rate of the baby’s birth causes an increased heart rate of the child, where midwives reveal that babies that are born too quickly can come out ‘stunned’, resulting in quickened heart rates. Joan gives birth to a daughter named Luna. It is revealed that Maya’s unborn child has developed medical complications, where at her 20-week ultrasound Maya discovered the unborn child has developed Ebstein’s anomaly, a serious heart condition. Due to these complications, Maya gives birth to baby Ruby via a caesarean section. The episode concludes with the news of new father Chris’s passing away 19 weeks after Ruby’s birth from cancer.
2	"One Born Every Minute"	29 October 2019
Episode two introduces Grant (31) and Akaysha (28), who have entered Westmead Hospital to give birth to a boy. Parents Chris (32) and Elyse (31) are also introduced, who are set to give birth to a breech baby. During Akaysha’s contractions, her unborn child passes meconium while still inside the womb. Due to the risk of meconium on a baby’s health and the risk of a previous caesarean scar reopening, Akaysha undergoes an emergency caesarean section, giving birth to baby Heath. After 25 hours in the hospital in labour, Elyse has a natural breech birth to baby Donovan. Sarah (33) and Liam (36) are introduced, who have a previous son born with congenital anomalies. Sarah gives birth to another boy, Finley.
3	"One Born Every Minute"	5 November 2019
Parents Chris (34) and Alexandra (34) are introduced. The couple had their first son in 2017, where hereditary medical complications in Alexandra’s previous birth led to an emergency caesarean section. Alexandra aims for a natural birth with her current pregnancy. Next, Daniel (34) and Marisa (35) are introduced. The couple have a young girl together and are currently pregnant with a boy. During her pregnancy, Marisa found out she had cancer, where Marisa’s chemotherapy could create complications for the baby’s health and birth. Alexandra gives birth via a caesarean section to baby Charli. Janet (32) and Blake (34) are next introduced, who have two previous children together and are in labour with another. Janet is a midwife herself and gives birth via a water birth to a boy, James. Marisa goes into an induced labour, giving birth to a healthy baby Alejandro. Marisa is given breast milk provided by the Cancer Council for women breastfeeding during chemotherapy.
4	"One Born Every Minute"	12 November 2019
Episode four opens with the scene of a baby born still inside an amniotic sac. Returning parents Kirin (26) and Lauren (26) are introduced, who already have two boys and are expecting another. Due to Lauren developing preeclampsia during her pregnancy, she has been put into an induced labour. First-time parents Thomas (26) and Allara (25) are next introduced. Allara was diagnosed with glycogen storage disease type 3a, creating complications in her ability to give birth due to low energy. Lauren gives birth naturally to baby Noah.
5	"One Born Every Minute"	19 November 2019
First-time parents Jasmin (29) and Jolly (29) are introduced. In the womb, Jolly’s baby is poorly positioned, where the unborn child's spine is against Jolly's back. This is causing increased contractions and labour pain for Jolly. Allara from Episode 4 undergoes an emergency caesarean section, due to a decreased heart rate from her child. Jolly gives birth, however due to the meconium present in the amniotic sac, the newly-born child needs its airways cleared by doctors. Allara gives birth to baby Ashton.
6	"One Born Every Minute"	26 November 2019
Lavinia (19) and her mother Michelle (46) are introduced, where Lavinia is expecting her first child. New parents Jason (31) and Kimberley (31) are also introduced. Upon birth Kimberley’s baby breathes in amniotic fluid, causing breathing difficulties for the child. These complications are fixed, and Kimberley gives birth to baby Harvey. Ella (31) and Jerico (34) are next introduced, where the couple already have one child together and are expecting another. Jerico is the United States for his brother’s wedding. During Ella’s first delivery complications arose due to Ella having an epidural, but needing a caesarean section. During Ella’s current birth similar complications arise, where due to cervical dilation issues Ella undergoes another caesarean section. Ella gives birth to Jayla Sapphire. Lavinia gives birth to Amaziah. The episode concludes with Ella and Jerico reuniting, and Jerico meeting Jayla Sapphire for the first time.
7	"One Born Every Minute"	3 December 2019
Renee (41) and Mark (48) are introduced, where the couple have one previous son together and are expecting another boy. Mark has two other sons from a previous marriage. Next, parents Bianca (29) and Daniel (29) are introduced. Bianca is only 33 weeks pregnant and has entered Westmead’s Birthing Unit due to premature contractions. This will be Bianca’s fourth pregnancy and Daniel’s second, where the couple are expecting twins. Renee gives birth to baby Ashton. Michael (38) and Xy-Za (32) are next introduced, where the couple give birth to baby Aurora. Westmead Hospital midwives aim to stop Bianca going into premature labour, where Bianca is given steroid injections to help mature the baby’s lungs in case the child is born before 34 weeks of pregnancy. It is revealed that one of Bianca’s daughters, Mackenzie, was diagnosed with acute lymphoblastic leukaemia a few weeks into Bianca’s pregnancy. As Bianca is in the hospital for premature contractions, Mackenzie is in the Westmead Children’s Hospital undergoing surgery. Bianca is discharged, returning four weeks later to give birth at a full-term pregnancy. The delivery of the first twin is a natural birth, however after the first child is born the second child twists in the womb due to excess space. Bianca must undergo an emergency caesarean section. Bianca gives birth to twins Brooklyn and Hunter. Unfortunately, Brooklyn died on 18 November 2019 due to SIDS, only 12 weeks after birth.
8	"One Born Every Minute"	10 December 2019
Partners Paul (27) and Rebecca (36) are introduced, along with Steven (30) and Sharn (32). Sharn’s first birth was an uncomplicated birth, however her second pregnancy and birth have complications due to her developing polyhydramnios, a condition that causes excess amniotic fluid in the uterus. Paul and Rebecca have a son, Ethan, and are about to welcome a daughter. Rebecca has a water birth, giving birth to baby Valentina. Ganesh (36) and Arti (34) are next introduced, who are planned to give birth to twins. Sharn gives birth to baby Marley. Arti has a natural birth with both twins Swarit and Taksh.
