= Per Christensen =

Norwegian actor

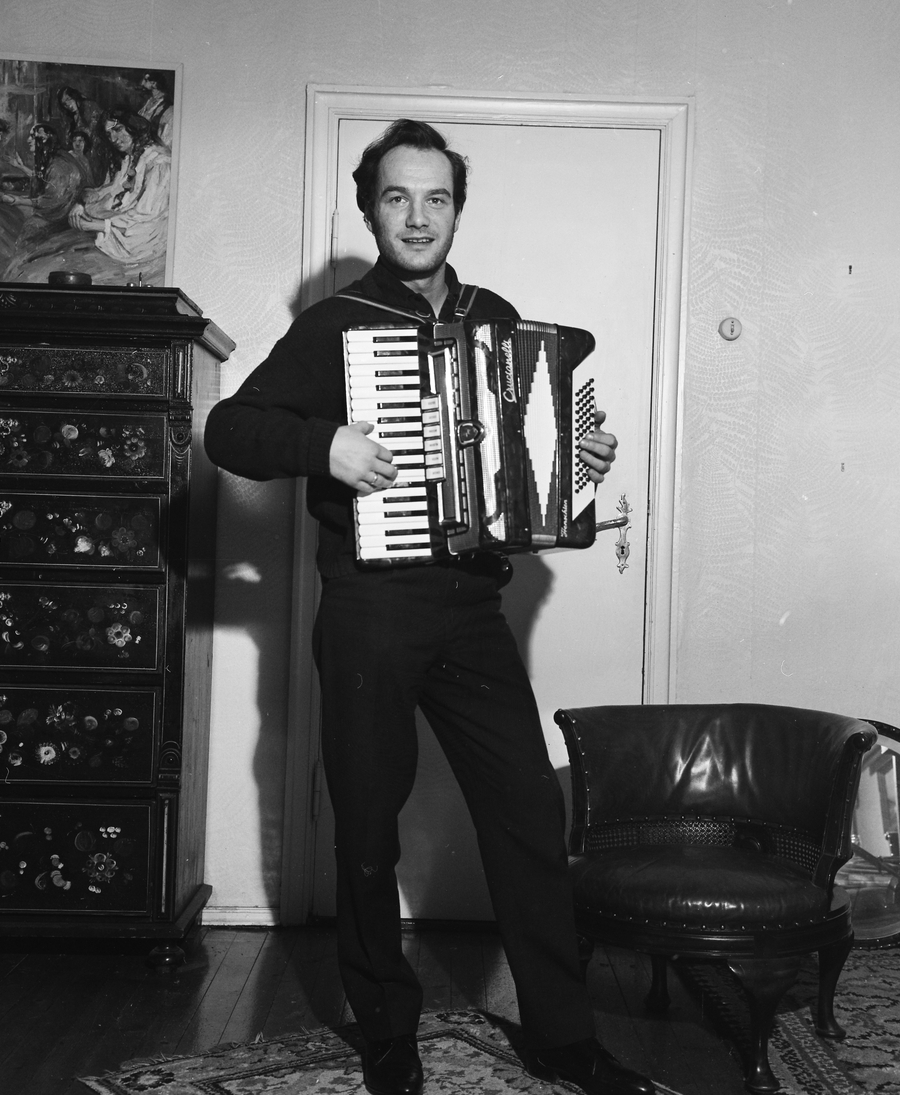
- Christensen in 1964
- Born: 18 July 1934; Norway
- Died: 26 August 2009 (aged 75); Oslo, Norway
- Occupation: Actor
- Years active: 1950–2005

Per Christensen (18 July 1934 – 26 August 2009) was a Norwegian actor. His film credits include Elling, Hotel Cæsar, The Warrior's Heart, and The Passionate Demons.

== Selected filmography ==
- 1957: Slalåm under himmelen
- 1958: I slik en natt as a railway employee
- 1961: Det store varpet as Ola
- 1967: Musikanter as a janitor
- 1973: Lina's Wedding
- 1987: Over grensen as the defense attorney
- 2001: Elling as Alfons Jørgensen
