= Jarowskij =

Swedish television production company

- Type: Subsidiary
- Founded: 1986; 40 years ago
- Founder: Rolf Sohlman
- Headquarters: Stockholm, Sweden
- Key people: Elin Kvist (CEO)
- Parent: Zodiak Media (2004–2016); Banijay Entertainment (2016–)
- Website: www.jarowskij.se/in-english/

Jarowskij is a Swedish TV production company that is part of Banijay Entertainment through its Scandinavian division Banijay Nordics.

== History ==
In April 2001, Jarowskij joined forces with Bavaria Film to jointly produce scripted daily & weekly programmes for the German and Eastern European markets.

By August 2004, Jarowskij and its Finland subsidiary Jarowskij Finland had been acquired by MTV Produktion AB and had it merged with its division MTV Mastiff Production AB, whilst retaining the Jarowskij brand. The acquisition gave MTV Produktion both the biggest Scandinavian production group and an entry into the Finnish television market with MTV's distribution arm MTV Mastiff International started distributing Jarowskij's programmes worldwide.

In May 2008, De Agostini announced that they've made a deal to acquire Jarowskij alongside its Stockholm-based Swedish/Scandinavian international television production and distribution parent Zodiak Television AB in a deal that would bring De Agostini's television subsidiaries together with Zodiak Television AB into one global entertainment production and distribution company.

In February 2016, Jarowskij alongside its production & distribution parent Zodiak Media had merged with Banijay Group had become the world's biggest leading indie television production company with Zodiak Media being folded into Banijay Group as Jarowskij became Banijay's new Swedish television production subsidiary and Banijay Group's first entry into the Swedish television market as Banijay's international distribution arm Banijay Rights started distributing Jarowskij's programmes.

In September 2024, Banijay Entertainment under its Nordic division Banijay Nordics restructured its operations in Sweden by merging three of its labels, Jarowskij, Yellow Bird and Meter Television into two labels with Jarowskij's scripted division being merged with Yellow Bird to become Jarowskij/Yellow Bird which will bring together the former's script wing with Yellow Bird's and will become the drama division with Elin Kvist becoming CEO whilst Jarowskij's unscripted division had merged with Meter Television effectively becoming Meter/Jarowskij.
