= Vanessa Borgli =

Norwegian actress (born 1972)

- Born: 4 October 1972 (age 53); Oslo, Norway
- Occupation: Actress
- Spouse: Ketil Skorstad (2004–present)
- Children: 1

Vanessa Borgli (born 4 October 1972) is a Norwegian actress, known primarily for her role as "Sue-Astrid Wallace" in the soap opera Hotel Cæsar. Borgli grew up in Oslo; her father is a movie producer and her aunt is the actress Pia Borgli. She studied theater in London, and debuted on Norwegian television in the TV series Offshore in 1996. Recently, she has also participated in more serious theater work, such as the church play Jeg så aldri flere sommerfugler her, about the Jewish children in Theresienstadt concentration camp.

Borgli married Ketil Skorstad in 2004, and the couple had their first child in 2005.
