= Toralv Maurstad =

Norwegian actor (1926–2022)

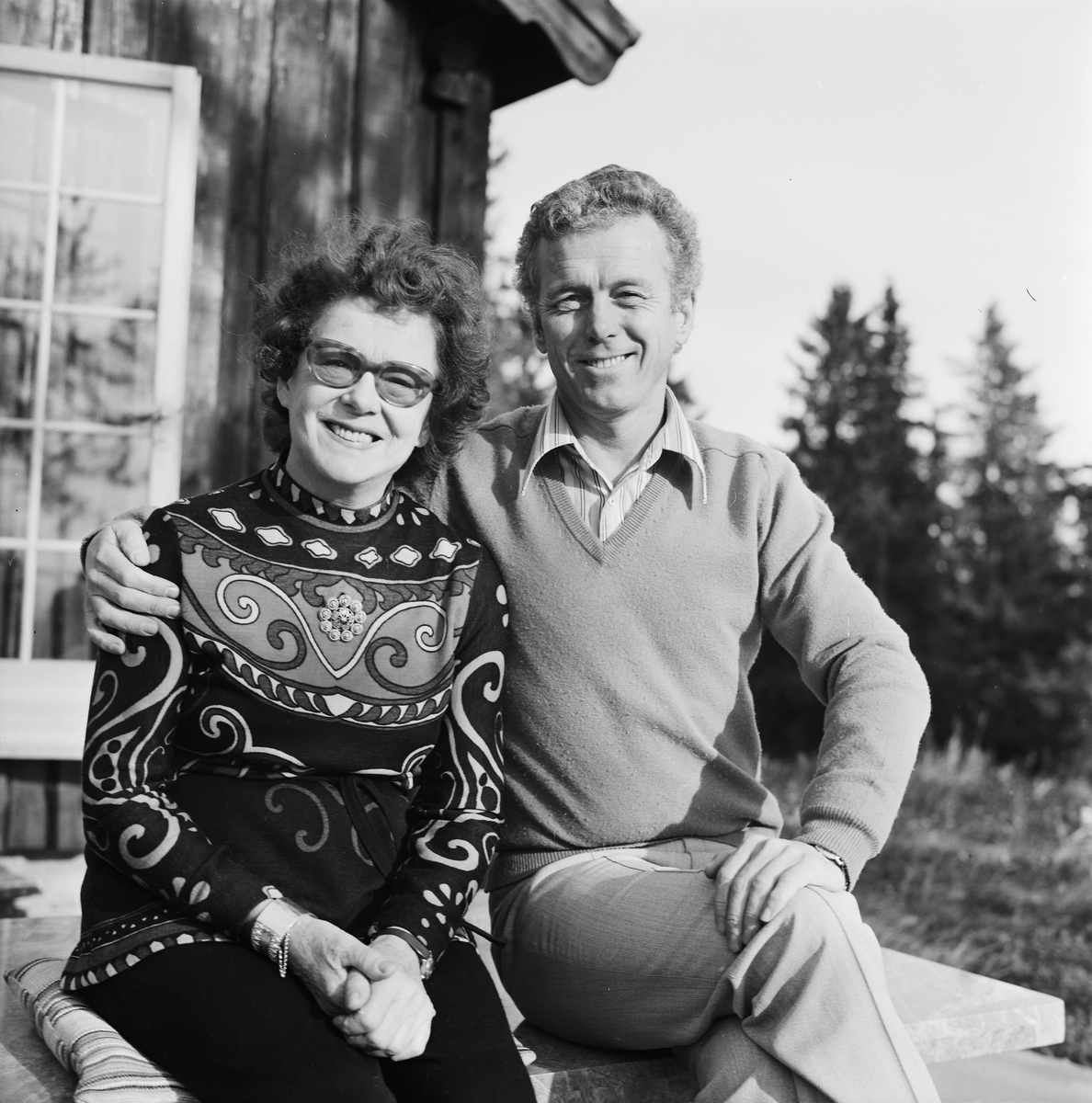
- Tordis and Toralv Maurstad in 1973
- Born: 24 November 1926; Bærum, Norway
- Died: 4 November 2022 (aged 95)
- Occupations: Stage, film and television actor
- Spouse(s): Eva Henning (m. 1954; div. 1970) Anne-Ma Burum (divorced) Beate Eriksen (m. 1999)
- Children: 2
- Parent(s): Alfred Maurstad (father); Tordis Maurstad (mother)
- Relatives: Mari Maurstad (half-sister)

Toralv Maurstad (24 November 1926 – 4 November 2022) was a Norwegian stage, film, and television actor. He was the son of actor Alfred Maurstad and actress Tordis Maurstad (née Witzøe), and half-brother of actress Mari Maurstad. His screen debut came in the 1937 film Fant, which starred his father Alfred.

Maurstad graduated from the Royal Academy of Dramatic Art (RADA) in London in 1949. Through the years he not only worked as a leading actor but was also a respected stage director, and was the head of Oslo Nye Teater (Oslo New Theatre) from 1967 to 1978. He was also head of Norway's National Theatre Nationaltheatret from 1978 to 1986. Maurstad was considered perhaps the greatest interpreter of Henrik Ibsen's Peer Gynt, having played the part numerous times (he even performed excerpts from the play as late as the 2002 Winter Olympic Games in Salt Lake City).

Maurstad's only American film appearance was the 1970 box office and critical disappointment Song of Norway, a musical about the life of composer Edvard Grieg co-starring Florence Henderson. It was based on the 1944 Broadway musical.

A testament to his position in Norwegian theatre came when in the 1970s he co-starred with Liv Ullmann in a critically acclaimed Broadway-staging of Ibsen's A Doll's House in New York City.

In 1974 the King of Norway made him a Knight, First Class of the Royal Norwegian Order of St. Olav and in March 2007, Maurstad was appointed a Commander of the Order of St. Olav.

== Personal life and death ==
Maurstad's first wife was the Swedish actress Eva Henning. They had two sons: Peder Maurstad and Momse Maurstad (who died at six months). He then married Anne-Ma Burum. He married his third wife, actress Beate Eriksen, on New Year's Eve 1999, when she was 39 and he was 73. In 2001, Eriksen's application for adopting a child was rejected because Maurstad was considered to be too old. According to Norwegian rules, people who intend to adopt a child should be between 25 and 45, and Maurstad was 74.

Maurstad died on 4 November 2022, at the age of 95.

Cultural offices
Preceded by Arild Brinchmann	Director of the National Theatre; 1978–1986	Succeeded by Kjetil Bang-Hansen
