= Tarald Weisteen =

Norwegian military officer

Tarald Weisteen DFC* (29 July 1916 – 26 December 2009) was a Norwegian military officer.

He was born in Norderhov. In 1945 he married Anne Margrethe Rørholt, and was thus brother-in-law of Bjørn Rørholt. During World War II he served as a pilot at the No. 331 Squadron RAF, and was decorated with the British Distinguished Flying Cross with Bar and the Norwegian St. Olav's Medal With Oak Branch. He was promoted to colonel in 1963, retiring in 1981.

He was biographed by Cato Guhnfeldt in 2004, in the book Nattjager. He died in December 2009.
