= One Born Every Minute =

- Genre: Reality television
- Narrated by: Steven Hartley (series 3-4); Paul Venables (series 5-8); Jonathan Kydd (series 9-11); Gemma Atkinson (series 12-)
- Country of origin: United Kingdom
- Original language: English
- No. of series: 11
- No. of episodes: 112 (list of episodes)

Production
- Executive producers: Magnus Temple and Nick Curwin (series 1); Peter Moore and Sanjay Singhal (series 2)
- Producers: Series 1: Jonathan Smith (series producer); Series 2: Francesca Newby (director of production), Lucy Bowden (series producer) and Lorraine Charker-Phillips (series director)
- Production company: Dragonfly

Original release
- Network: Channel 4 (2010–2018); E4 (2026–)
- Release: 9 February 2010 – 9 May 2018

One Born Every Minute is a British observational documentary series which shows activities taking place in the labour ward. The programme originally ran for eleven series on Channel 4, premiering on 9 February 2010 and airing its final episode on 9 May 2018.

Channel 4 announced in August 2019 that One Born Every Minute had been cancelled. In April 2026, Channel 4 announced that the series would return (but this time on E4) later in the year and solely filmed at Saint Mary's Hospital in Manchester.

== Production ==
One Born Every Minute has to date achieved the highest ratings of any "fixed rig" multicamera documentary series, with its most popular episodes attracting audiences in excess of five million. The "rig" technique for making factual television was pioneered by Dragonfly founders Nick Curwin and Magnus Temple, in partnership with Channel 4 commissioning editor Simon Dickson, in 2008.

== Awards ==
The first series won a 2010 BAFTA for best factual series; the second series was nominated for a 2011 BAFTA for best factual series. Airlock, who designed the interactive and multimedia material to accompany the series, were nominated for a 2010 BAFTA "New Media Award".

== International versions ==
In February 2011 an American version of One Born Every Minute premiered in the USA on Lifetime Television and in August 2011 a French adaptation named Baby Boom premiered on France's TF1. There have been two seasons of the American show and five of the French. There have been eleven UK series.

Country	Name	Network	Date premiered
France	Baby Boom	TF1	23 August 2011
USA	One Born Every Minute	Lifetime Television	1 February 2011
Sweden	En unge i minuten	TV4	7 March 2011
Israel	Baby Boom	Channel 10	2013
Spain	TBA		
Slovakia	Malé lásky	TV Markíza	2020
Czech Republic	Malé lásky	TV Nova	2017
Denmark	One Born Every Minute	Kanal 4	2018
Australia	One Born Every Minute Australia	Network 10	22 October 2019

== Spoof ==
The 2013 edition of the Comic Relief telethon featured a three-way spoof/mini-episode aired under the One Born Every Minute title and logo: a parody of the show's format with appearances by the cast of Call the Midwife along with Matt Smith as the Doctor from Doctor Who and closing narration by Vanessa Redgrave.
