= Marius Eriksen =

Norwegian gymnast (1886–1950)

- Full name: Emil Marius Eriksen, Sr.
- Born: 9 December 1886 Barbu, United Kingdoms of Sweden and Norway
- Died: 14 September 1950 (aged 63) Oslo, Norway
- Relatives: Marius Eriksen Jr. (son); Stein Eriksen (son); Beate Eriksen (grand daughter)

Gymnastics career
- Discipline: Men's artistic gymnastics
- Country represented: Norway
- Gym: Chistiania Turnforening
Medal record
Men's artistic gymnastics
Representing Norway
Olympic Games
Bronze medal – third place	1912 Stockholm	Team, Swedish system

Emil Marius Eriksen, Sr. (9 December 1886 – 14 September 1950) was a Norwegian gymnast who competed in the 1912 Summer Olympics, in Stockholm, Sweden. He was born in Barbu, Norway and died in Oslo. He was the father of Marius Eriksen, Jr. and Stein Eriksen and the grandfather of actress/ film director Beate Eriksen. Eriksen was part of the Norwegian gymnastics team, which won the bronze medal in the gymnastics men's team, Swedish system event.
