= Kaj Birksted =

Danish flying ace

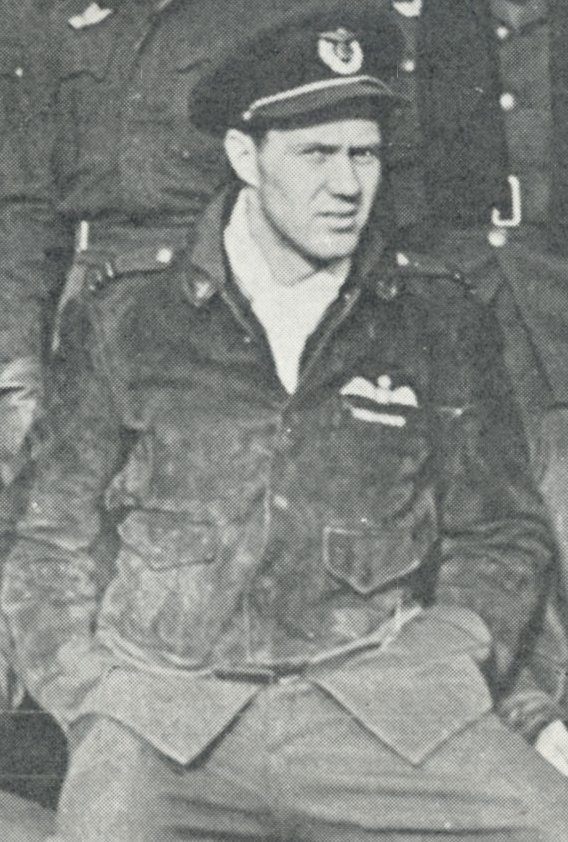
- Birksted in 1942
- Born: 2 March 1915
- Died: 21 January 1996 (aged 80)
- Military career
- Allegiance: Denmark
- Branch: Royal Danish Air Force; Royal Air Force; Royal Norwegian Air Force
- Units: No. 331 Squadron; No. 11 Group
- Awards: DSO, OBE, DFC, War Cross With Sword

Kaj Birksted (2 March 1915 – 21 January 1996) was a Danish flying ace during World War II where he served in the Royal Air Force (RAF), rising to the rank of wing commander in the RAF and lieutenant colonel in the Royal Norwegian Air Force.

== Early life ==
Kaj Birksted was born in Copenhagen, Denmark. Shortly after his birth, his family moved to the United States. The family returned to Denmark 12 years later, where in 1928 Birksted went to Birkerød Boarding school. In 1936, he was admitted to Naval Flying School and was nominated two years later to fly in the reserve. On 22 December 1937, he was appointed Flyverløjtnant-II (flight 2nd lieutenant) and later promoted to Flyverløjtnant-I (flight 1st lieutenant) in January 1940. On 9 April 1940, when the German forces invaded Denmark, he was serving at the Naval Air Station, Slipshavn.

== World War II ==
On the night of 16–17 April 1940, Birksted and fellow officer Charles Sundby escaped by boat from Denmark to Sweden, and then to the United Kingdom. From October 1940, he trained in Canada at Little Norway, the Norwegian flight school where he worked as a student/instructor. On 1 November 1940, Birksted was accepted into the Norwegian Air Force, with the rank of Fenrik (2nd lieutenant), being promoted to Løytnant (lieutenant) on 1 December 1940.

Returning to the UK in March 1941, Birksted attended 56 OTU in mid May 1941, flying the Hawker Hurricane Mk. I. He was then transferred to No. 43 Squadron in late June 1941 and served until 26 July. He was then posted to the Norwegian-manned No. 331 Squadron as a flight commander, then based in Catterick. In April 1942, the squadron moved to North Weald, converting to the Supermarine Spitfire Mk. V. On 19 June 1942 Birksted made his first combat claims: a Focke-Wulf Fw 190 shot down and another damaged. He was promoted to Kaptein (flight lieutenant) on 24 July 1942, and on 19 August participated in the air operations supporting Operation Jubilee at Dieppe.

He then commanded No. 331 Squadron from September 1942 to April 1943. On 14 October 1942, Birksted was decorated with the Distinguished Flying Cross.

On 1 August 1943, Birksted became an RAF wing commander and soon after the equivalent Oberstløytnant in the Norwegian Air Force and appointed as wing leader of No. 132 (Norwegian) Wing, flying the Spitfire Mk. IX. On 26 November 1943, he received the Distinguished Service Order.

Birksted's tour ended in March 1944, and he was attached to No. 11 Group Staff in Uxbridge as an operational planner. On 16 March 1945, he was appointed Wing Commander Flying at RAF Bentwaters, flying the North American P-51 Mustang.

During the war Birksted claimed a total of ten and one shared aircraft confirmed destroyed with five damaged.

== After the war ==
He returned to Denmark after the war, rejoining the newly formed Royal Danish Air Force as a senior staff officer. Birksted was in the Royal Danish Air Force until 1960 with the rank of colonel, after which he took up a position at NATO.

== Other sources ==
- Shores, Christopher F. & Clive Williams (1966) Aces High: The Fighter Aces of the British and Commonwealth Air Forces in World War II (Shores & Williams)
- Ancker, Paul E. (2006) De danske militære flyverstyrkers udvikling 1910-1940 (Syddansk Universitetsforlag)
