= Marius Eriksen Jr. =

Norwegian alpine skier and pilot (1922–2009)

Marius Eriksen
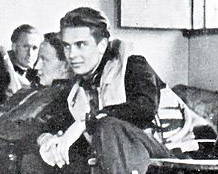
- Eriksen at RAF Catterick in 1942
- Born: 8 December 1922; Kristiania, Norway
- Died: 6 July 2009 (aged 86); Oslo, Norway
- Military career
- Allegiance: Norway
- Branch: Norwegian Army Air Service
- Other work: Alpine skier, actor

Marius Eriksen Jr. (8 December 1922 – 6 July 2009) was a Norwegian skier, fighter pilot, model and actor.

== Biography ==
Eriksen was born on 8 September 1922 in Kristiania (now Oslo) in Norway. His father, also called Marius Eriksen, was a gymnast who competed for Norway at the 1912 Summer Olympics. His mother was Birgit Eriksen. During his early years, Eriksen (junior) gained some success at slalom skiing and ski jumping. Eriksen's younger brother, Stein Eriksen, went on to win an Olympic gold medal in skiing.

Following the outbreak of World War II, Eriksen fled Norway, leaving on 5 November 1940 via Ålesund. After arriving in Scotland, he made his way to Canada, where he underwent flying training at Little Norway, the Norwegian Army Air Service flight training school.

On his return to the United Kingdom, Eriksen served with No. 331 (Norwegian) Squadron RAF and then No. 332 (Norwegian) Squadron RAF as a fighter pilot flying Spitfires. He achieved nine kills, making him one of Norway's aces, before he was shot down off the coast of the Netherlands attempting a head-on attack against a Focke-Wulf Fw 190. Eriksen survived and after being captured on 2 May 1943, he was held as a prisoner of war at Stalag Luft III in Poland until 1945. He began his service with the RAF as a Sergeant, but was later commissioned as a Second Lieutenant. In recognition of his wartime service, Eriksen was awarded the War Cross with Sword, St. Olav's Medal With Oak Branch, Haakon VIIs 70th Anniversary Medal, the Norwegian War Medal, the Norwegian Defence Medal, the British Distinguished Flying Medal, and the American Silver Star.

After the war, Eriksen became the Norwegian champion in alpine skiing in both 1947 and 1948. He also competed in two events at the 1948 Winter Olympics.

== Honours and awards ==
- War Cross with Sword
- St. Olav's Medal With Oak Branch
- War Medal
- Defence Medal 1940–1945
- Haakon VII 70th Anniversary Medal
- Distinguished Flying Medal (United Kingdom)
- Silver Star (United States)
