= Dragonfly (production company) =

British television production company

Dragonfly Film and Television Productions Ltd
- Formerly: Firefly (2004–2008)
- Type: Subsidiary
- Industry: Television production
- Founded: 2004; 22 years ago
- Founders: Nick Curwin; Magnus Temple
- Headquarters: London
- Parent: Shine Group (2006–2015); Banijay UK Productions (2015–present)
- Divisions: Dragonfly North
- Website: www.dragonfly.tv/home/

Dragonfly Film and Television Productions Ltd, trading as Dragonfly, is a British television production company owned by Banijay Entertainment. It has produced factual programmes for BBC One, BBC Two, BBC Three, BBC Four, ITV, Channel 4, Channel 5, Discovery Channel and National Geographic Channel.

== History ==
The company was founded in 2004 by Nick Curwin and Magnus Temple as Firefly Film and Television Productions until December 2008 when it adopted its current name. Its output mainly consists of documentary series such as Kill It Cook It Eat It, The Hotel, World's Toughest Trucker, Beat The Ancestors, Tony Robinson's Crime and Punishment, Ambulance and Eva Longoria: Searching for France.

Its documentary for Channel 4 One Born Every Minute, based on a maternity ward, won the Best Factual Series BAFTA in 2010.
