= Banijay Group =

French entertainment company

Banijay Group N.V.
- Formerly: FL Entertainment N.V. (2022–2024)
- Type: Public
- Traded as: Euronext Amsterdam: BNJ
- Industry: Entertainment
- Incorporated: Amsterdam, Netherlands
- Founded: May 2022; 4 years ago
- Headquarters: Paris, France
- Key people: Stéphane Courbit (chairman); François Riahi (CEO)
- Revenue: ▲€7.4 billion (2026)
- Number of employees: 11,148 (2025)
- Divisions: Banijay Entertainment (50%); Banijay Gaming
- Website: group.banijay.com

Banijay Group N.V. is a French entertainment holding company based in Paris, France, and legally incorporated in Amsterdam, Netherlands. It was formed in May 2022 from a merger with special-purpose acquisition company (SPAC) Pegasus Entrepreneurs, which saw independent television production group Banijay and online sports betting group Betclic go public.

== History ==
In May 2022, it was announced that Stéphane Courbit would take Banijay and Betclic public through a holding company called FL Entertainment that would merge with Pegasus Entrepreneurs, a special-purpose acquisition company backed by European asset management company Tikehau Capital and investment firm Financière Agache, while existing Banijay shareholders such as Vivendi would continue to invest in the new company. Shares began trading on Amsterdam's Euronext stock exchange on 1 July with an enterprise value of €7.2 billion and an equity value of €4.1 billion.

On 15 June 2023, Banijay announced that it would acquire a majority stake in Balich Wonder Studio, a live entertainment production studio. Following the deal and FL's investment in The Independents, FL launched a live events division called Banijay Events that will capitalise on Banijay's expertise and success in content production and expand FL's capabilities within the wider entertainment industry with former Banijay France CEO François de Brugada leading the new division.

In March 2024, FL posted revenues of €4.5 billion for 2023, an increase of 13.8%.

On 15 May 2024, FL Entertainment announced a group-wide rebrand under the Banijay name. FL Entertainment N.V. became Banijay Group N.V., while the Banijay television production arm became known as Banijay Entertainment. Banijay Events also became Banijay Live, while the online sports betting and gaming businesses, consisting of the Betclic and Bet-at-home brands, were housed under Banijay Gaming.

In late January 2025, Banijay Live acquired multimedia live experience producer Lotchi. A month later, Banijay Live launched a new unit dedicated to develop their IP portfolio into games and exhibitions named Banijay Live Studio.

In October 2025, Banijay Gaming agreed to acquire the Tipico gambling brand from CVC Capital Partners for €3 billion (US$3.5 billion). To make sure the deal would receive regulatory approval, Banijay divested its 53.9% stake in Bet-at-home in January 2026. The acquisition was completed on 23 April 2026.

On 13 January 2026, the Banijay Group confirmed reports earlier that month that it was in talks with RedBird IMI to merge their respective Banijay Entertainment and All3Media television production businesses. A merger agreement, also encompassing Banijay Live, was announced on 3 March 2026, with the Banijay Group and RedBird IMI confirmed to hold 50% in the combined business, which would be called Banijay Entertainment. The deal closed on 9 July 2026, with the new company, consolidated under Banijay Group, being headquartered at All3Media's London headquarters.

== Assets ==
=== Current ===
==== Gaming ====
- Betclic
- Tipico
  - Admiral

=== Former ===
- Bet-at-home – divested in January 2026
