= Statscore =

Polish sports data company

STATSCORE Sp. z o.o.
- Formerly: Softnet, softnetSPORT
- Company type: Limited liability company
- Industry: Sports data Sports media Sports betting
- Founded: January 2006; 20 years ago Katowice, Poland
- Headquarters: Katowice, Poland
- Key people: Dariusz Łęczyński (CEO)
- Products: LivematchPro PrematchPro; ScoutsFeed; SportsAPI; Tipster; PointsInPlay; LeagueCenter; TipsterAPI; StatsWidgets ScoreFrame
- Services: Sports data provision, sports media, betting
- Website: www.statscore.com

STATSCORE is a sports data company with headquarters in Katowice, Poland. STATSCORE provides sports statistics, data and live match information to sports organizations, leagues, media outlets, broadcasters and betting operators.

Founded in January 2006 as softnetSPORT, STATSCORE offers a range of products, including sports widgets, live trackers, data visualizations, minisites, data feeds, sports tips, and gamification tools.

STATSCORE's data currently covers around 30 sports all over the world, including soccer, American football, basketball, baseball, volleyball, rugby, ice hockey, tennis, futsal and ski jumping.

STATSCORE employs a global team of scouts which covers more than 10,000 live events per month, and delivers data in real-time.

In 2022, STATSCORE was acquired by LSports, a provider of sports data feeds and services. In 2024, the company underwent a comprehensive rebranding process, which included redesigning its product identities, online presence, visual identity, and logo, as well as opening a new office in Katowice.

== Partners and clients ==
STATSCORE has been a data provider to numerous sports leagues and federations, including Polish Fortuna 1 Liga, Polish Futsal Ekstraklasa, PGNiG Superliga (both men and women competitions), Polska Hokej Liga (Polish Hockey League), and Slovak Slovnaft Handball Extraliga., as well as professional sports clubs, such as Sporting Clube de Portugal. STATSCORE's data has been widely used by sports betting companies, such as EveryMatrix, BtoBet, Altenar, STS, and tipp3. Sports statistics collected by the company have also been employed by media outlets, including Le Figaro and Onet.pl.

In the 2020 season, STATSCORE was the naming rights sponsor of the Polish Futsal Ekstraklasa.

== Awards ==
In 2016, STATSCORE won the Deloitte Rising Stars Award. In 2017 and 2020, the company was shortlisted in two categories at the SBC Awards. In 2018, STATSCORE was recognised as one of the 50 fastest-growing technology companies in Central Europe (Technology Fast 50 CE).
