= EveryMatrix =

Software company

EveryMatrix Ltd
- Type: Private
- Industry: Software Gambling
- Founded: 2008
- Headquarters: Sliema, Malta
- Key people: Ebbe Groes (Co-CEO & co-founder, board member) Jonas Groes (Co-CEO) Stian Hornsletten (CEO Games & co-founder, board member) Norbert Teufelberger (Chairman of the Board) Mark McMillan (Non-executive board director) Gonzalo De Osma Bucero (CFO, board director)
- Number of employees: +1500 (2026)
- Divisions: platform, casino, sports betting, payments, affiliate software
- Website: https://everymatrix.com

EveryMatrix Ltd is a B2B iGaming software provider company founded in 2008 with its headquarters in Malta. EveryMatrix supplies online gambling platforms, products, and software to online casinos, sportsbook operators, and state-owned or private lotteries. EveryMatrix is a member of the European Lotteries Association, World Lotteries Association, and CIBELAE.

EveryMatrix counts Norsk Tipping (Norway), OPAP (Greece), National Lottery (Malta), Veikkaus (Finland), Szerencsejáték Zrt. (Hungary), and Danske Spil among its customers within the Lottery sector, and bet-at-home.com, Tipico, and Flutter Entertainment in regulated markets. EveryMatrix does not operate any B2C business.

== Products ==
EveryMatrix delivers a casino, sports betting, payments, and affiliate/agent management product suite.

EveryMatrix expands into the gaming development vertical by launching Spearhead Studios in 2019, Armadillo Studios in 2021, and acquiring Fantasma Games in 2024.

== Operations ==
EveryMatrix is a private company currently employing over more than 1500 staff across its sixsteen offices in Europe, Asia, and the United States. The company operates within the iGaming sector as a business-to-business software provider.

EveryMatrix was co-founded by Ebbe Groes and Stian Hornsletten. The company is currently led by Ebbe Groes and Jonas Groes, as Co-Chief Executive Officers. In 2019, EveryMatrix appointed Stian Hornsletten as Chief Commercial Officer. In 2024, Stian Hornsletten moved to CEO of the company's Games division.

In 2017, EveryMatrix completed a EUR 4.3 million (US$4.7 million) private strategic investment round and widened its shareholders' base. Following the investment round, Norbert Teufelberger (former CEO of Bwin) is appointed as chairman of the board, joining the two co-founders, Ebbe Groes and Stian Hornsletten, and other company members in the company board.

Each product vertical has its own domain-focused business unit driving product development with its own management (CEO, CTO, development, operations, support). The business units are responsible for product operations and development, whereas the Group is responsible for leading and assisting these units.

== Clients ==
In 2017, Tipico, the largest sports betting operator in Germany, signed with EveryMatrix to develop its casino offering.

In 2017, EveryMatrix won the public tender for Norsk Tipping's procurement of the iGaming Integration Platform after a year-long selection process. EveryMatrix has been selected to supply the service, platform and integration via the CasinoEngine platform to Norsk Tipping's KongKasino, Bingoria, and FLAX brands.

In 2019, the global sports betting, gaming and entertainment provider Flutter Entertainment joined the EveryMatrix client list with its brand Betfair. The agreement sees EveryMatrix selected to provide its CasinoEngine iGaming Integration Platform and a selection of market-specific gaming suppliers in Spain.

In 2020, EveryMatrix won OPAP's casino tender to provide casino services, platform, and front-end, together with RNG and live gaming content, to Greece's former state-owned gambling monopoly. EveryMatrix's CasinoEngine, the iGaming integration and productivity platform, and EveryMatrix's BonusEngine were plugged into OPAP's in-house wallet.

In June 2022, iGaming software provider EveryMatrix and National Lottery plc, a subsidiary of IZI Group plc, signed an agreement with the supplier to provide online games for the National Lottery of Malta.

In October 2022, B2B iGaming technology provider EveryMatrix was awarded the public tender to provide the Finnish state-owned gaming and lottery monopoly Veikkaus with casino content.

In January 2023, EveryMatrix won the Hungarian lottery tender for an online sportsbook platform and services.

== History ==
EveryMatrix was founded in 2008 and opened its first offices in London, Bucharest, and Changsha.

The first version of the EveryMatrix sportsbook went live in 2009, the casino product emerged in 2012, the affiliate and agent management platform made its comeback as an independent product in 2016, and the payment platform became fully certified and operational in 2017.

In 2011, the company opened a new office in Malta and secured a B2B Malta licence (Type 2) for fixed-odds betting, including live betting. EveryMartrix subsequently opened new development offices in Lviv, Ukraine (2013), Yerevan, Armenia (2015) and a new business and commercial hub in Ski, Norway (2018).

In November 2019, EveryMatrix announced the launch of Spearhead Studios, formed by an experienced team that was acquired from Gaming Innovation Group. Based in Marbella, Spain.

2020 finds EveryMatrix increasing its Esports offering during the worldwide ban on real-life sports events. By May 2020, live esports events coverage surpassed 50,000 monthly events monthly across 19 esports via OddsMatrix's Esports Services. A selection of Virtual Sports also became available to operators via CasinoEngine direct API integration.

In August 2020, EveryMatrix recruited online gaming executive Erik Nyman as part of its leadership team to drive the company's expansion in the US market and open the company's first US office.

The company's global workforce reached 500 employees in October 2020 as EveryMatrix opened a new office in Chiang Mai, Thailand after the group acquired TOTOIT, a Thailand-based web development company.

In 2021, EveryMatrix opened Armadillo Studios to announce its first iGaming development investment in the United States. Armadillo Studios is part of EveryMatrix Group and is based at the company's headquarters in Miami, Florida. Armadillo Studios is set to develop online casino games based on U.S. market-specific player preferences.

In May 2022, it was announced EveryMatrix had acquired the Zagreb-headquartered B2B sports betting developer, Leapbit for an undisclosed amount.

== Licences and certifications ==
EveryMatrix Software Limited is licensed and regulated in Great Britain by the Gambling Commission under account number 39383 and the Malta Gaming Authority, licence number MGA/B2B/201/2011.

In 2019, EveryMatrix was granted approval to operate its CasinoEngine platform on the Spanish market by Dirección General de Ordenación del Juego (DGOJ).

In 2020, EveryMatrix filed an application for a US license in New Jersey.

In May 2022, EveryMatrix announced the organisation had obtained its license from the lottery commission in West Virginia after applying in December 2021. The company plans to supply content developed from its two in-house studios Spearhead Studios and Armadillo Studios to operators in the state and will be achieved through EveryMatrix's integration platform for casinos called CasinoEngine.
