= Pierre-Édouard Stérin =

French entrepreneur

- Born: Pierre-Édouard Robert Raymond Marie-Joseph Stérin; 3 January 1974 (age 52); Évreux, Normandy, France
- Education: Paris 1 Panthéon-Sorbonne University, Emlyon Business School
- Occupation: Activist
- Children: 5
- Father: Claude Stérin

Pierre-Édouard Robert Raymond Marie-Joseph Stérin (French pronunciation: [pjɛʁ edwaʁ ʁɔbɛʁ ʁemɔ̃ maʁi ʒɔzɛf steʁɛ̃]; born 3 January 1974, Évreux) is a French entrepreneur, billionaire and conservative activist. He is the cofounder of the gift card company Smartbox, the investment fund Otium Capital, and the philanthropic organization Fondation du Bien Commun.

== Early life ==
Stérin grew up in Normandy in a middle-class family. His father is a chartered accountant and his mother works in a bank. He attended the Lycée Aristide-Briand in Évreux, in the economics stream.

== Career ==
In 2023, Stérin made an unsuccessful joint bid with Daniel Křetínský and Stéphane Courbit for about 37% of Vivendi's publishing division Editis. In 2025, he was part of a consortium that agreed to buy right-wing magazine Valeurs Actuelles.

In 2023, he and François Durvye co-invested €2.5 million to buy Jean-Marie Le Pen's family house in Paris. In 2025, his fortune was estimated at around 1.3 billion euros (1.5 billion dollars).

== Political activities ==
Stérin is close to traditionalist Catholicism. In 2024, he launched the Périclès project, an initiative to strengthen right-wing policies in France. Together with the media entrepreneur and billionaire Vincent Bolloré, he organized the "Summit of Freedoms" ("sommet des libertés") in 2025. At the summit, media makers brought together conservative and right-wing politicians.

== Personal life ==
Stérin is married and has five children. Since 2012, he has lived in Belgium for tax reasons and justifies his move as follows: "I am very critical of the government. So many freedoms are being curtailed, and all the taxes imposed on us are being misused."
