= Birkenstock =

German shoe manufacturer

Birkenstock Holding plc
- Formerly: Birkenstock Group B.V. & Co. KG
- Type: Public
- Traded as: NYSE: BIRK; Russell 1000 component
- Industry: Shoe manufacturing
- Founded: 1774; 252 years ago
- Founder: Johann Adam Birkenstock
- Headquarters: Linz am Rhein, Rhineland-Palatinate, Germany
- Key people: Oliver Reichert (CEO); Michael Chu (chairman)
- Products: Shoes
- Revenue: ▲€1.80 billion (2024)
- Operating income: ▲€421 million (2024)
- Net income: ▲€192 million (2024)
- Total assets: ▲€4.88 billion (2024)
- Total equity: ▲€2.63 billion (2024)
- Owners: L Catterton (72%); Financière Agache (5.5%)
- Number of employees: 7,400 (2024)
- Website: Official website

Birkenstock Holding plc is a German shoe manufacturer known for its sandals and other shoes notable for contoured cork footbeds (soles), made with layers of suede and jute, which conform to the shape of their wearers' feet. Founded in 1774 by Johann Adam Birkenstock and headquartered in Neustadt (Wied), Rhineland-Palatinate, Germany, the company's original purpose was to create shoes that support and contour the foot, compared to the flat soles of many shoes during that time. In 1896, the Fussbett (footbed) was designed, and by 1925, Birkenstocks were sold all over Europe.

In 1966, Margot Fraser first brought Birkenstocks to America. In the United States, they were sold in health stores, thus becoming associated with hippies in the 1970s.

== History ==
=== Early years ===
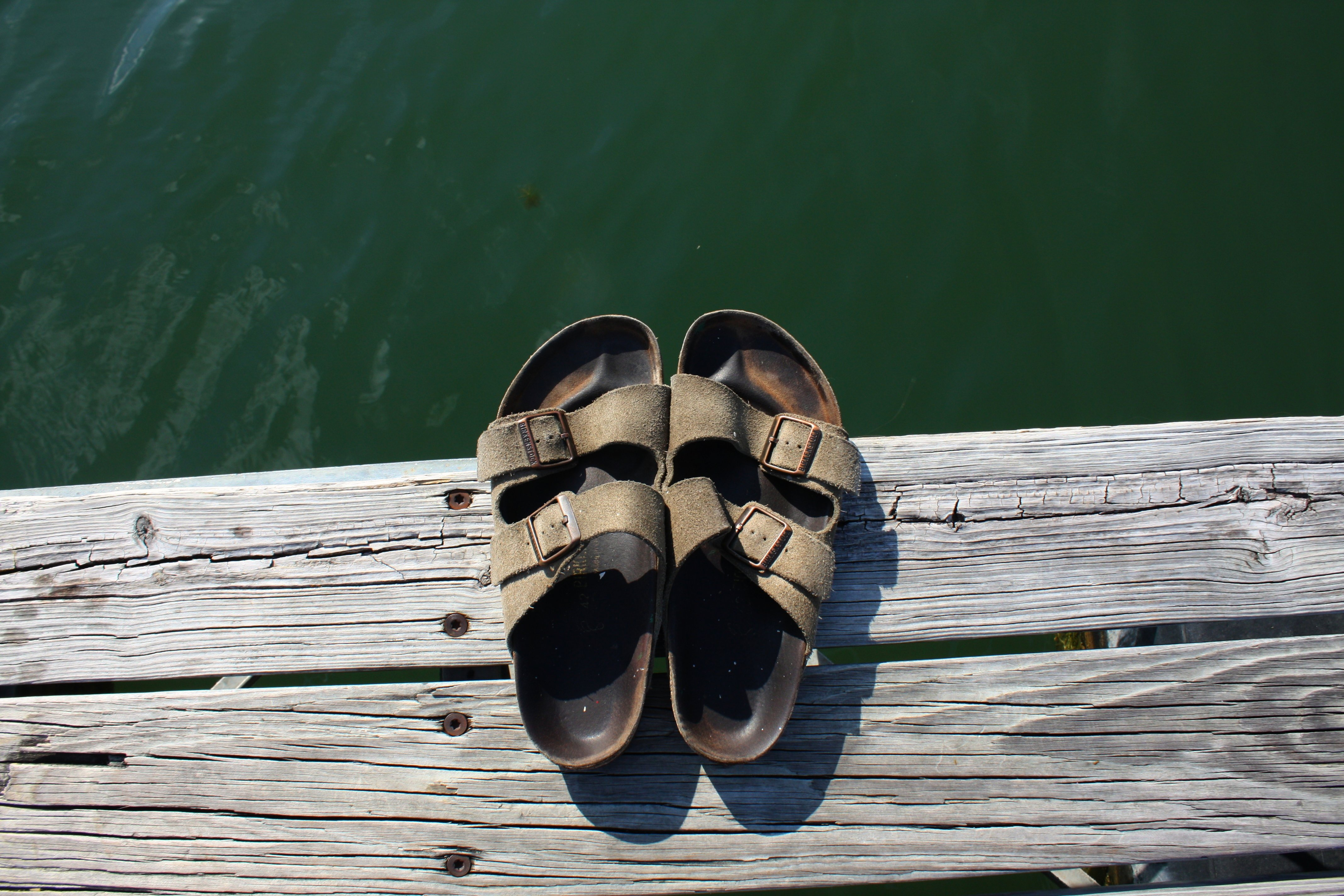
A pair of Birkenstocks near the ocean

The history of the Birkenstock "shoemaking dynasty" can be traced back to the first documented mention of Johannes Birkenstock (1749–1812), registered on 25 March 1774, as a "vassal and shoemaker" in local church archives in the small Hessian village of Langen-Bergheim. Since that time, there have been five generations of master shoemakers or part-time shoemakers, several lines of the Birkenstock family working in the shoemaking trade and finally three generations of shoe manufacturers. In 1774, Johannes Birkenstock had already trained as a shoemaker and settled in the small Hessian town of Langen-Bergheim; he became a master shoemaker shortly afterwards. After his younger brother Johann Adam Birkenstock (born 1754) died in 1790, his son Johannes (1790–1866) grew up with his uncle Johannes and also became a master shoemaker.

His grandson, Konrad Birkenstock (1873–1950), left the Wetterau after also training as a shoemaker and opened an orthopaedic shoemaker's workshop in Frankfurt am Main in 1896 and founded Konrad Birkenstock GmbH a year later. Konrad Birkenstock developed the first contoured insole for use by shoemakers in the production of custom footwear. His success in orthopaedic circles with his insoles and health shoes and the satisfaction of his customers did not lead to financial success. The inventor Konrad Birkenstock concentrated too much on the further development of his material mix in order to further develop healthy walking. When he himself was called to the orthopaedic workshop of the Friedrichsheiner Klinik in Frankfurt am Main – and therefore did not have to do military service – he relocated his business activities. In 1915, Konrad Birkenstock acquired a house in Friedberg (Hesse), where the production of insoles now took place. In 1925 Konrad Birkenstock acquired the Derfelt soap factory in Friedberg, Hesse, thereby expanding production.

As a master orthopaedic shoemaker, Konrad Birkenstock invented a fully plastic last as early as 1897 and a fully plastic flexible insole in 1902. Shoes made on this last and with this insole were called "health footwear" by Konrad Birkenstock. With this invention, Konrad Birkenstock had followed the ideas of the shoe reform, which, in keeping with the times, rethought the human body. His flexible insoles, developed along the same lines for healing purposes, differed from the rigid insoles made of metal that were common at the time. In 1914, Konrad Birkenstock's insoles were recognized as orthopaedic remedies for the first time. He gave two of these insoles the name "footbed". In 1925, Konrad Birkenstock was able to register the "Fussbett" trademark. In the 1920s, Birkenstock insoles were already being supplied to Austria, France, Denmark, Czechoslovakia, Italy, Luxembourg, Belgium, Norway, the Netherlands, Sweden and Switzerland.

Konrad Birkenstock had three sons and one daughter. Over the course of time, they all became involved in the manufacture of orthopaedic insoles, in different companies and in different family constellations. His eldest son Carl (born in 1900) followed in Konrad Birkenstock's footsteps during the First World War. He visited specialist shoe stores and shoemakers and explained to them the use and effect of the "Birkenstock system", as the combination of a fully plastic last and flexible footbed was soon called. Carl continued to develop his father's deposits, was active with his own business in Vienna from 1923 to 1926 and founded Geb. Birkenstock GmbH in Steinhude am Meer together with his brothers Heinrich and Konrad Jr. in 1929. From 1939, Carl Birkenstock continued to run the company, which at that time had 13 employees, alone without his brothers. Carl Birkenstock took the idea of foot health even further than his father and limited sales of his insoles to specialist retailers and shoemakers who had successfully completed his training course. Although he managed to get over 6,000 people to attend this course, this approach still limited his sales options in the long term. However, it was important to him that his flexible insoles were fitted correctly in order to achieve the effect of a foot-health-preserving insole. He wanted to avoid incorrect use at all costs.

Carl Birkenstock joined the Nazi Party (NSDAP) in 1940. Carl continued to sell insoles at least until 1943, the year he unsuccessfully tried to enlist in the Sturmabteilung. Birkenstock attempted to gain government contracts in the early '30s, pitching his products to Hitler Youth, testing his insoles on SS members, and selling to individual soldiers. Six of the owners of Gebr. Birkenstock GmbH in Steinhude im Meer were drafted into the Wehrmacht. However, despite these ties, Birkenstock had no supply contracts between Birkenstock and the Wehrmacht, the Nazi Party or its organizations, or links to the Schuhprüfstrecke of the Sachsenhausen concentration camp, nor is there any record of the firm or company "Aryanizing" Jewish property.

After World War II (1939–1945), the Birkenstock sandal was popular among returning soldiers because of the orthopaedic support. After 1945, Carl Birkenstock continued to pursue his idea of his handmade healthy footwear at his new headquarters in Bad Honnef near Bonn. He wanted to make this "ideal shoe" suitable for mass production, which he tried to realize together with shoe manufacturers until 1961, when he abandoned this idea and retired to writing books on foot health. During this time, the still very small company earned money through the successful sale of the "Blue Footbed" orthopaedic insole. In 1954, Carl's only son, Karl, joined his father's company. While his grandfather Konrad and father Carl Birkenstock worked all their lives on producing orthopaedic insoles that were as individualized as possible for the wearer, the young Karl Birkenstock succeeded in making healthy footwear mass-produced in 1962 with the invention of a standardized, permanently installed, anatomically shaped insole.

In 1963, Karl Birkenstock released his first model, the "Original Birkenstock Footbed Sandal", an athletic sandal with a flexible footbed, which has been called "Madrid" since 1979, laying the foundation for the company's expansion since the 1970s. The shoe was constructed so that the wearer would have to grip their toes to keep the sandals on; this resulted in toning the calf muscle, which became quite useful to athletes, especially among gymnasts. However, the market launch in 1963 was a disaster. No shoe retailer wanted to offer the gender-neutral sandal, which was diametrically opposed to the shoe fashion trend of the time – Italian stilletos – and consequently, orders failed to materialize. The first sales were made through direct marketing in the medical sector. Birkenstock Orthopädie GmbH, as the company was now called, was run jointly by Karl and his wife Gisela. The number of employees in 1970 was 57.

=== Margot Fraser and introduction to U.S. ===
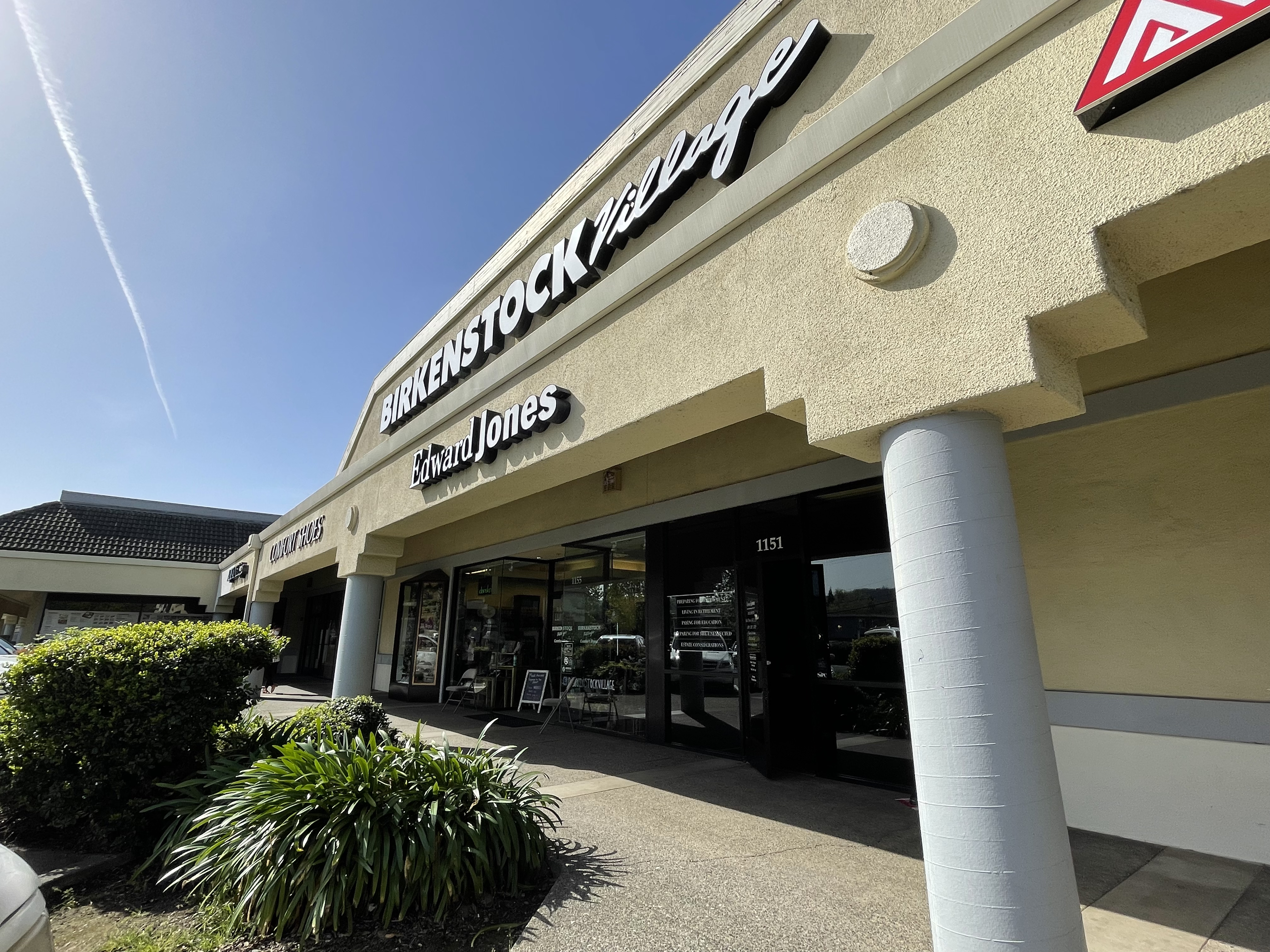
A Birkenstock branded store, Birkenstock Village, in Santa Rosa, California

In 1966, Margot Fraser, a German-American dressmaker who resided in Santa Cruz, California, decided to visit a spa in Bavaria, where she was recommended Madrids to help with a foot ailment caused by tight shoes. Due to Fraser's relief from her foot condition and her enthusiasm for the sandals, Birkenstocks were introduced in the United States—though some hurdles stood in the way of their eventual acceptance by American buyers. Many shoe stores rejected the sandals due to their appearance, leading Fraser to health stores near the granola section. The 1970s brought a spike in sales. In the United States, Birkenstocks were first popular among young men and later on among flower children, a group traditionally associated with American liberalism. The shoe became popular with hippies and others who had a "back to nature" philosophy and appreciated the natural foot shape and foot-friendly comfort of Birkenstocks. Hippies and representatives of the tech movement in California discovered the shoes as an expression of the unconventional. In the 1970s, Fraser successfully continued to sell them from organic supermarkets and quickly expanded with her company, Birkenstock Footprint Sandals, Inc., in Novato, California, which later became Birkenstock USA, in the largest market for Birkenstocks since the 1980s.

Birkenstock sandals became popular in Germany in the 1980s. Since the 1960s, Birkenstock sandals had become popular in the care professions and in the alternative and peace movement, and then also in "middle-class" households as slippers and leisure shoes. They were not developed for the medical sector, but were designed from the outset for young and old as well as all types of occupations and leisure activities. Although derided at the shoe trade fair in 1963, Karl Birkenstock developed the closed sandal "Zürich" the following year, followed by the strappy sandal "Roma" in 1965, the low shoe "Oslo" and the boot "Athen" in the second half of the 1960s. A first plastic model – the "Noppy" massage sandal – saw the light of day in the new decade. In 1973, Birkenstock's most popular sandal, Arizona, was introduced. This was followed in 1976 by the first cork clog, the "Boston", and finally in 1983 by the range of thong sandals, including the "Gizeh".

=== Expansion and present-day ===
In 2005, Fraser's trading company Birkenstock Footprint Sandals, Inc. was renamed Birkenstock Distribution USA, Inc. (BDUSA). The company remained the exclusive importer and distributor of Birkenstock name-brand products in the United States until 2007. In 2007, the owners of Birkenstock Orthopädie GmbH & Co. KG purchased their long-standing distribution partner BDUSA.

In 1986 Nordstrom became the first department store to sell Birkenstock sandals.

The success of Birkenstock sandals in Europe and the USA since the 1970s has led to strong growth for the company. After the German reunification in 1990, Karl Birkenstock seized the opportunity and expanded production into the new federal states. However, growth came at a price: conflicts arose with various trade unions within the company. After Karl Birkenstock retired from the company in the early 2000s, his three sons, Christian, Stephan, and Alexander Birkenstock, took over management and ownership. The handover took the form of a multi-brand strategy, with Alexander, Christian and Stephan Birkenstock each being responsible for their own brands and companies. Each of them had different ideas for the company's future and ended up creating multiple competing product lines and subsidiaries.

Since the 1980s, the fashion world, celebrities and designers have discovered Birkenstock for themselves and outfitted their models with the iconic sandals. The first appearance with André Walker in New York can be traced back to 1983. Pictures of models also adorned covers and articles in well-known fashion magazines. As a result, the sandals also became increasingly popular and mainstream, until the multi-brand strategy gradually eroded customer interest. Serious disputes developed, particularly with the US market and Margot Fraser, over the new competing brands within the Birkenstock Group.

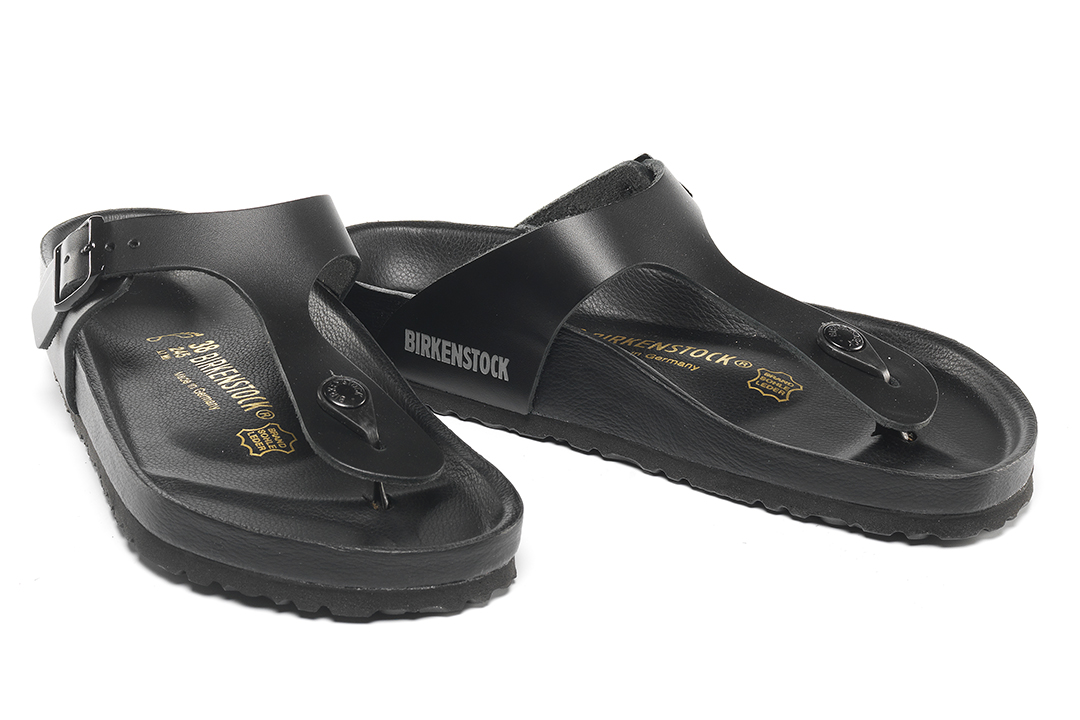
Birkenstock EVA Gizeh

In the early 1990s, "Birks" enjoyed another spike in sales among high-school and college-aged Gen X'ers, in part due to the introduction of Birkenstocks into High Fashion, most notably by Kate Moss. Birkenstocks continued to spread to Britain in the early 2000s due to headlines about Gwyneth Paltrow, who was spotted wearing them. Birkenstocks saw another comeback among teens and young adults in the early 2010s, as well as in the late 2010s due in part to the VSCO girl trend. The company was given PETA's Libby Award for being the "Most Animal-Friendly Shoe Company" in 2018.

In 2013, the company, which had previously consisted of 38 individual companies since the 1990s, was fundamentally restructured to form a single group of companies, the Birkenstock Group. In 2013, Stephan sold his stake to the two brothers; they recruited Oliver Reichert, an outsider, to consolidate various subsidiaries into Birkenstock Group and lead the company.

In February 2021, the American-French investment company L Catterton and the family holding Financière Agache, the private equity firm backed by Bernard Arnault's LVMH, acquired a majority stake in the German sandal manufacturer Birkenstock. The parties have agreed not to disclose the purchase price or other details of the transaction. According to media reports, they had agreed to buy Birkenstock in a deal that valued the company at about €4 billion. Christian and Alex Birkenstock retained minority ownership and remained responsible for production in Germany.

In September 2023, Birkenstock filed for an initial public offering (IPO) in the United States stating that the company would be listed on the New York Stock Exchange under the stock ticker "BIRK". The company completed the IPO and went public on October 11th 2023, raising $1.48 billion at a valuation of $8.64 billion. Following the IPO, L Catterton continued to be a controlling shareholder with an 83% ownership stake. Alex Birkenstock exited his stake following the IPO.

As of 2023, 72% of Birkenstock customers were female.

In September 2024, Birkenstock launched a six-product foot care line, followed in April 2026 by a nail polish collection, marking its expansion into the beauty sector.

== High fashion ==
Birkenstock has been collaborating with fashion brands and designers since the early 2000s. The third collaboration, initially the most significant due to its duration, was with Heidi Klum and began in 2003. In 2012, Birkenstocks were spotted on a Céline runway in Paris. Called "Furkenstocks", this recreation of the Arizona sandal incorporated a mink-covered footbed. The "Furkenstocks" caused a sensation and soon, Birkenstock sandals were appearing in fashion magazines once again. Besides Céline's creative director Phoebe Philo, many other designers have also created their version of the sandal, including Giambattista Valli and Givenchy.

In 2019 Valentino collaborated with Birkenstock to create their version of the sandal featured at Men's Paris Fashion Week.

That same year, the company established 1774, a premium line and showroom based in Paris named after Birkenstock’s founding year. The range focuses on collaborations merging the brand's traditional craftsmanship with international artists. The 1774 logo lettering was created in 2018 by Bruno Michaud of the studio BMD Design.

On 3 June 2021, the Birkenstock Group announced a collaboration with fashion designer Rick Owens. Starting on June 4 of that year, interpretations of the Arizona and Boston models were released. A new Rotterdam style was also presented and released for sale.

In May 2023, as part of its efforts to limit the spread of third-party imitations, Birkenstock began seeking to have its sandal designs deemed as works of art for copyright purposes. (Note: Some of Birkenstock's sandal designs no longer benefited from design protection since this lasts for twenty-five years only; since, however, Karl Birkenstock himself was still alive as of March 2025, the company would have been able to benefit from the longer-lasting protections afforded under copyright law (the creator's life plus another seventy years) had legal proceedings gone its way.) After courts in Cologne had found for and then against the company, proceedings ended in February 2025 when the German Federal Court of Justice definitively ruled that Birkenstock's designs did not qualify for artwork status and instead remained at the level of a practical design item.

== Production ==
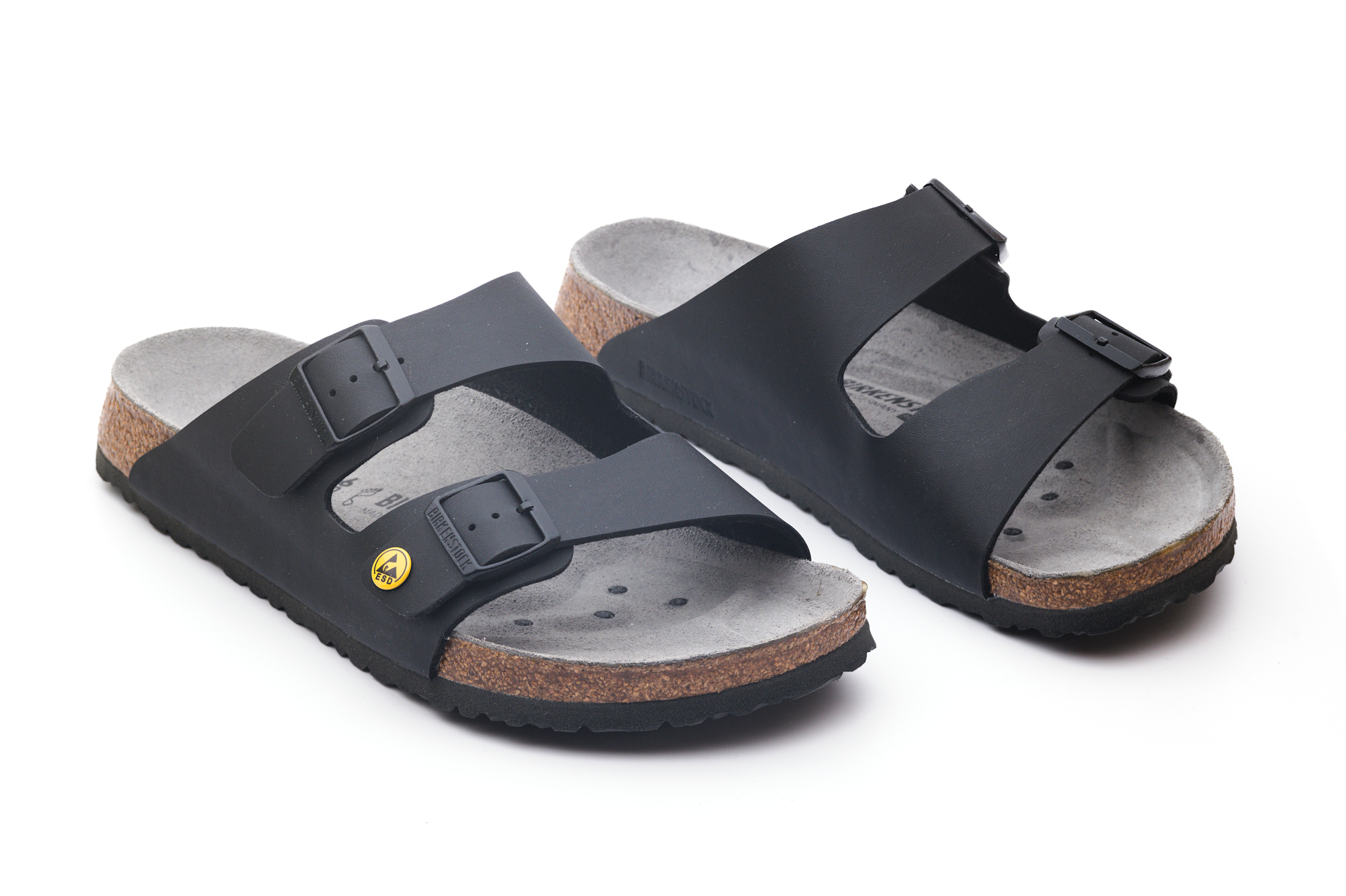
A pair of black Arizona ESD Birkenstocks

The original footbed of the Birkenstock shoe was created in the 1930s and possesses four different layers that complete the shoe. The first layer of the shoe is the shock-absorbent sole, followed by a layer of jute fibers, a firm cork footbed, and another layer of jute. The last layer is the footbed line, which is a soft suede.

In addition to the original footbed, Birkenstock gives the option of a soft footbed. The shoe is made of the same materials as the original footbed, with the addition of a foam insert placed under the suede lining.

In 2015, Birkenstock introduced a lightweight, waterproof shoe called the Birkenstock EVA, made of ethylene-vinyl acetate (EVA).

== See also ==
- List of shoe styles
