= LSports =

Israeli technology company

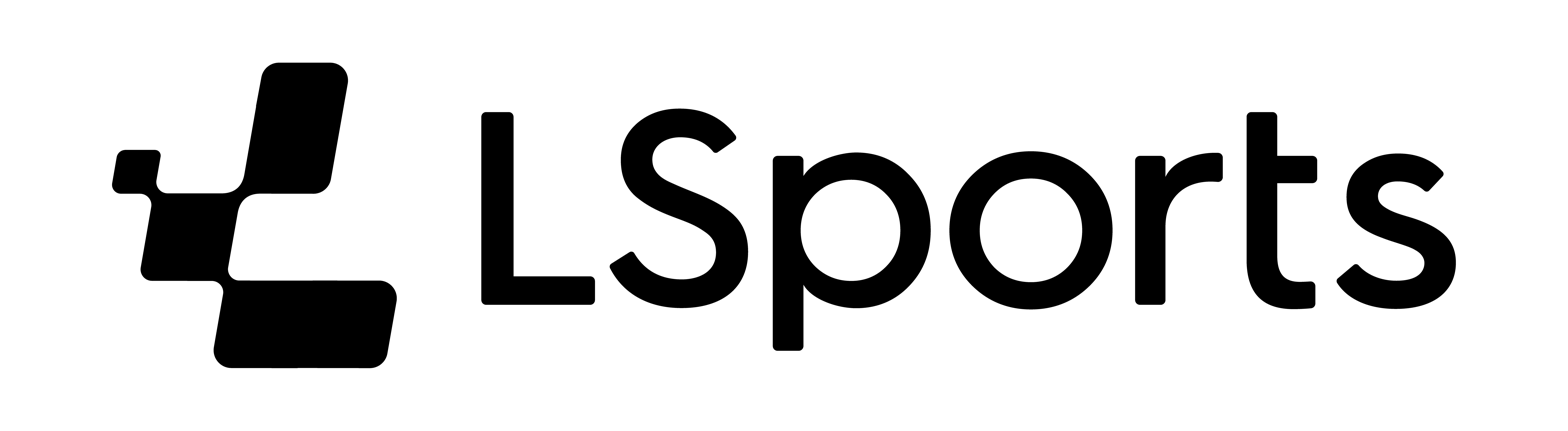

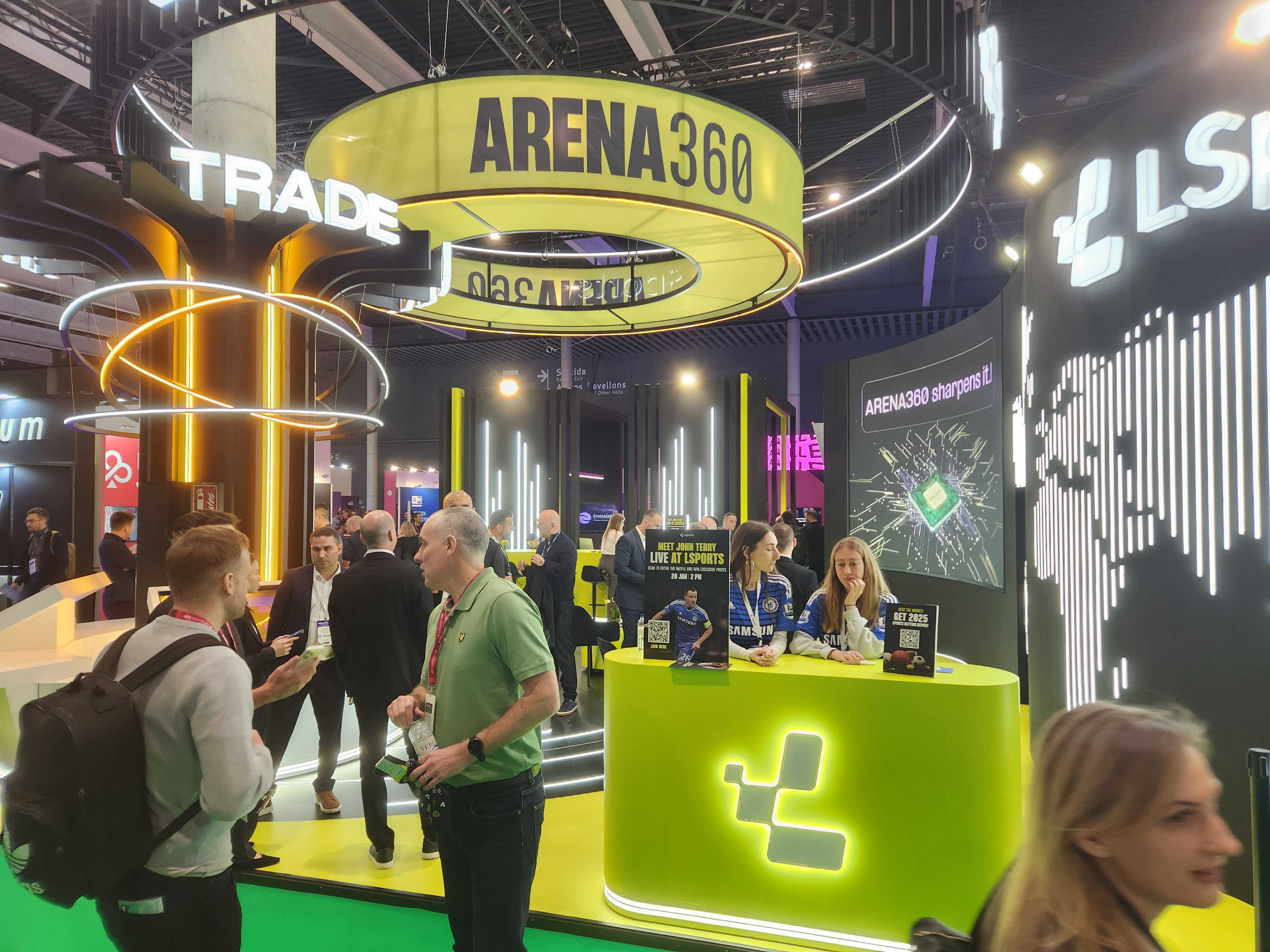
- ICE conference January 19, 2026
- Type: Private
- Industry: Sports data, Sports media, Sports betting
- Founded: 2012; 14 years ago
- Founders: Dotan Lazar, Ido Lazar, Shaul Lazar
- Headquarters: Ashkelon, Israel
- Key people: Dotan Lazar (CEO)
- Services: Real-time sports data solutions, betting services
- Website: www.lsports.eu

LSports is an Israeli technology company that provides real-time sports data technologies. LSports also holds a sports betting license from the Colorado Division of Gaming.

In September 2022, LSports acquired STATSCORE.

== History ==
LSports was founded in 2012 by Dotan Lazar, Ido Lazar, and their father, Shaul Lazar. The company offers services to bookmakers, such as 888, 1Win and SkyBet, and media companies, including ESPN Brasil and WSC Media. In 2020, Dotan Lazar was appointed CEO of LSports, replacing Shaul Lazar. In 2021, the company extended its partnership with the British online gambling firm, 888 Holdings, to provide sports data services for its online gambling platform.

In April 2021, LSports launched the Sports Trading Manager (STM), the company's proprietary automated trading system. STM enables bookmakers to manage their margins, automate odds suspension, and create odds based on competitor data.

In June 2021, LSports entered into a five-year, exclusive data distribution deal with the American Flag Football League, valued at $6 million. In May 2021, LSports signed an exclusive distribution deal with LVision, becoming the sole distributor of LVision's bet stimulation products. In September 2021, the Colorado Division of Gaming granted LSports a sports betting license to provide sports data solutions to operators based in the U.S. state of Colorado. In December 2021, LSports partnered with BetConstruct to provide automated sports betting tips through BetBooster, and in January 2022, the company partnered with Pronet Gaming.

In April 2022, LSports expanded its AI-driven betting tips generator, BetBooster, by adding handball and cricket to its supported sports.

In September 2022, LSports acquired STATSCORE. In October, LSports became the sole provider of Brazilian basketball data until 2031.

In November, LSports was the title data partner for the Qatar 2022 World Cup. The company also began sponsoring the Ashkelon-based basketball team Elitzur Eito in the same year. In April, LSports launched new player prop markets to enhance betting options in the US sports betting market.

In June, LSports launched TRADE, an upgraded version of its STM product, designed to improve sportsbooks with advanced data and automation features.

In January 2024, LSports released a comprehensive guide detailing the new regulations in the Brazilian sports betting market, aimed at helping operators navigate the updated legal landscape and ensure compliance.

In July, LSports received a B2B license in Peru, allowing the company to offer its sports betting data services in the country. This license enables LSports to expand its presence in the Latin American market and provide advanced data solutions to local operators in Peru. In August 2024, LSports became the official technology partner of the International Tennis Federation (ITF).

In 2025, LSports was ranked at number 25 of the best high-tech companies to work for in Israel.

== Services ==
It provides access to over 100 sports, 150,000 leagues, 3 million fixtures, and more than 2,500 betting markets.

LSports consolidated its various products into a unified ecosystem called ARENA360. The platform uses artificial intelligence to automate sportsbook operations, ranging from odds generation, risk management, competitor analysis to player retention.
