= Pong Research =

Pong Research Corporation
- Type: Corporation, formerly: Private
- Industry: Computer hardware; Mobile Device Accessories
- Defunct: 2014
- Fate: Changed Name
- Successor: Antenna79, Inc.
- Area served: Worldwide
- Website: BRINKcase.com

Pong Research Corporation was a cell phone accessories company that invented the Pong Case, a cell phone case with an embedded antenna that reduces exposure to cell phone radiation.

== History ==
Pong Research was incorporated in 2011 and in 2014 relocated to Leesburg, Virginia to Encinitas, California. The company was financially backed by Catterton Partners, the leading consumer-focused private equity fund with over $4.5 billion under management. In 2014, the company changed its name to Antenna79, Inc. In 2016 Antenna79 merged with Invisible Gadget Guard, Inc. (a cell phone accessories company specializing in screen protection) to become Penumbra Brands, LLC.

== Technology ==
The Pong Case antenna technology was created by PhD scientists educated at Harvard, MIT, UCLA and the University of Manchester. Using their knowledge of manipulating radiofrequency (RF) electromagnetic fields, Pong invented a coupling and re-radiating antenna that redistributes cell phone near-field radiation. Pong's first product was for the iPhone 3G.

The cases were made of a hard polycarbonate called Lexan and contain a micro-thin, gold-plated coupled antenna system (CAS) that redirects wireless energy away from the user, thus reducing exposure to mobile device radiation well below the FCC Specific Absorption Rate (SAR) limit—without compromising the device's ability to communicate.

The cases use a passive antenna coupling technology works via a micro-thin gold-plated antenna embedded inside the Pong Case that redistributes the RF signal emitted from a mobile device away from the user's head and body without compromising the device's ability to communicate. Pong has 8 patents granted and 20 filings pending.

In 2017 the Pong Case was renamed alara, which stands for "as low as reasonably achievable", in reference to the technology significantly reducing RF exposure without compromising the device's ability to communicate.

== Lab test results ==
In October 2009, Wired magazine tested the product at Cetecom, an FCC-certified lab in Milpitas, California that tests cell phone radiation levels for handset manufacturers. Using a specific anthropomorphic mannequin head filled with a brain-tissue simulating fluid. After a phone call simulation with and without the Pong case, it was found that the specific absorption rate (SAR) was reduced by 64.7% to 0.42 watts per kilogram.
