= L Catterton =

American venture capital and private equity firm

- Type: Private
- Industry: Financial services
- Founded: 1989; 37 years ago
- Founder: J. Michael Chu; Frank Vest; William E. Simon
- Headquarters: Greenwich, Connecticut, U.S.
- Number of locations: 17 offices (worldwide)
- Key people: J. Michael Chu; Scott Dahnke
- Products: Private equity; Growth capital
- AUM: US$33 billion (2023)
- Website: lcatterton.com

L Catterton is an American multinational private equity firm. Founded in Greenwich, Connecticut, in 1989, the fund has made over 250 investments in brands across all segments of the consumer industry. The firm is led by its CEO, Scott Dahnke, and Chairman, Michael Chu. Originally Catterton Partners, the fund merged with Bernard Arnault's family office and LVMH in 2016 to create L Catterton.

In June 2024, L Catterton ranked 39th in Private Equity International's PEI 300 ranking among the world's largest private equity firms.

== History ==
=== Founding and early history ===
Catterton was founded in 1989 as Catterton-Simon Partners by Carl Frischkorn (Catterton Family), his accountant Frank Vest and J. Michael Chu, along with former U.S. secretary of the treasury William E. Simon. Between 1992 and 2002, the company invested in well-known consumer brands including P. F. Chang's, Odwalla, and Baja Fresh. In 2001, the firm changed its name to Catterton Partners.

=== 2002–2016 ===
Catterton Partners logo, 2015

Between 2002 and 2016, Catterton completed investments in numerous consumer growth businesses including Peloton, Build-A-Bear Workshop, Ferrara Candy Company, Outback Steakhouse, Restoration Hardware, Wellness Pet Company, and Kettle Foods.

In 2003, Scott Dahnke joined the firm as a co-Managing Partner. In 2008, the firm launched its first growth fund targeting investments in early to late-stage growth companies. These investments included Vroom, Sweaty Betty, Il Makiage, Sweet Leaf Tea Company, Tula and Pong Research. In 2013, the firm launched its Latin America fund targeting investments in Latin American middle market growth companies. Notable investments in the Latin America strategy include Cholula Hot Sauce and NotCo.

=== 2016–present ===
In January 2016, Catterton, LVMH, and Financière Agache (previously Groupe Arnault), the family holding company of Bernard Arnault, partnered to create L Catterton. The partnership combined Catterton's existing North American and Latin American private equity operations with LVMH and Groupe Arnault's pre-existing European and Asian private equity and real estate operations. The merged firm is now called L Catterton and invests globally from six fund platforms: L Catterton Flagship Buyout, L Catterton North American Growth, L Catterton Latin America, L Catterton Europe, L Catterton Asia, and L Catterton Real Estate. In May 2021, Private Equity International listed L Catterton as the 32nd largest private equity firm in the world based on capital raised over the prior five years.

In 2020, L Catterton raised over $5 billion for its ninth buyout fund and over $950m for its fourth growth fund.

In April 2024, the company bought a majority stake in the makeup retailer Kiko Milano. In June 2024, it acquired Stripes, a beauty and wellness brand focused on menopause health founded by actress Naomi Watts.

In January 2025, L Catterton entered into a strategic partnership with Japanese premium fishing gear maker Megabass, aiming to expand Megabass's production and distribution network to respond to rising demand in Japan and the United States.

== Investments ==
The firm has backed several notable investments, including Birkenstock, Healing Hands Clinic,, Jio Platform, Ainsworth Pet Nutrition, Peloton, Nature's Variety, Pinarello, Freetrade, the Miami Design District, Cover FX, Polène, and Ginza Six.
