= Stéphane Courbit =

French businessman in media and television (born 28 April 1965)

- Born: 28 April 1965 (age 61); Crest, Drôme, France
- Education: ISG Business School Paris; University Institutes of Technology, Valence
- Occupations: CEO at LOV Group; Chairman at Banijay Group

Stéphane Courbit (born 28 April 1965) is a French businessman in the sector of media and television.

In 2022, his net worth was estimated to be €2,200 million euros. He was listed as the 56th-richest man in France.

== Biography ==
=== Beginnings ===
Stéphane Courbit graduated from the ISG Business School of Paris and the University Institutes of Technology of Valence.

In 1990, he took part in the talk show, Ciel, mon mardi !. At the end of the show, he met the host, Christophe Dechavanne, and made him a show proposal. Christophe Dechavanne hired him as an intern at its production company Coyote where Stéphane Courbit became the producer of shows such as Combien ça coûte ?, Coucou c'est nous ! and La Première Fois.

=== Audiovisual production ===
In September 1993, he made a brief appearance on TF1 to work on the show TV Vision produced by Charles Villeneuve.

In the spring of 1994, he collaborated with the French TV presenter Arthur with whom he created the company CASE productions (Courbit Arthur Stéphane Essebag), which would become ASP (Arthur Stéphane Productions).

In 1998 and 2001, Endemol purchased ASP in two sessions and Stéphane Courbit became the president of Endemol France. In April 2001, Endemol France produced Loft Story, a reality television show aired by M6.

== LOV Group ==
At the end of 2007, Stéphane Courbit left Endemol to create his own holding company, LOV Group, focused on activities related to the entertainment and IT industries.

LOV Group operated in four main businesses.

=== Audiovisual production ===
In January 2008, alongside Groupe Arnault, the Agnelli and De Agostini families and AMS Industries, Stéphane Courbit created Banijay Group, a holding company regrouping a dozen of production companies: Air Productions (Nagui), Banijay Productions (formerly ALJ of Alexia Laroche-Joubert), H2O Productions (Cyril Hanouna) in France; Cuarzo in Spain; Brainpool in Germany; Nordisk in Norway; Bunim/Murray in the United States; Screentime in Australia.
In 2007, Courbit invested in Euro Media Group, the European leader in providing audiovisual services that owns the television studios of La Plaine St Denis through Studios de France.
In July 2015, Banijay and Zodiak Media announced their merger, creating the world's largest content production and distribution company not controlled by a media group in February 2016.

=== Online gambling ===
At the end of 2007, Stéphane Courbit created Mangas Capital Gaming, renamed BetClic Everest Group, which acquired four companies in the area of sports gambling, poker and on-line casino: Betclic in 2007, Expekt and Bet-at-Home in 2009.

=== Energy ===
Stéphane Courbit has been a shareholder alongside Jacques Veyrat in Direct Energie, an alternative provider of electricity in France. In July 2011, Direct Energie announced an agreement with Verbund in which Direct Energie would buy 46% of Poweo.

After its merger with Poweo, Direct Energie became France's third energy provider after EDF and Engie (forme GDF-Suez) and the first independent electricity provider. In 2016, Direct Energie supplied electricity and natural gas to over 2 million customers.

In July 2018, French major Total completed its acquisition of a 73% stake in Direct Energie. The deal, worth €1.4 billion ($1.65 billion), was first announced in April. Total will buy Direct Energie's shares for €42 each.

=== Luxury hospitality ===
Stéphane Courbit invested in tourism. LOV Group's subsidiary LOV Hotel Collection owns and/or operates luxury hotels in Courchevel (Les Airelles, acquired in 2007 and Aman Le Mélézin, acquired in 2013), in Saint-Tropez (Pan Dei) and in Gordes (La Bastide de Gordes acquired in the beginning of 2014).

=== Others ===
In 2009, Stéphane Courbit entered the music-label company My Major Company, founded by Simon Istolainen, Michael Goldman, Sevan Barsikian, Anthony Marciano and Boris Pavlovic. He also invested in Le Five, the first network of indoor soccer clubs in France (equity withdrawn in 2016).

== Misuse of mental ability re Liliane Bettencourt ==
On 28 May 2015, the Bordeaux criminal court issued a €250,000 fine to Courbit for wrongfully obtaining €144 million in investment funds from aging L'Oréal heiress Liliane Bettencourt, citing the use of false information and omissions, and in general, misuse of her diminishing mental ability.
