= Tikehau Capital =

French investment company

- Type: Limited partnership
- Traded as: Euronext: TKO
- Industry: Financial services
- Founded: 2004; 22 years ago
- Founder: Mathieu Chabran
- Headquarters: Paris, France
- Area served: France
- Key people: Antoine Flamarion and Mathieu Chabran
- Products: asset management with investment in private debt, private equity, real estate, and capital markets
- Net income: 320,000,000 (2022)
- AUM: €43.2 billion (2025)
- Number of employees: 758 (2024)
- Website: tikehaucapital.com

Tikehau Capital is a French company in the finance and asset management sector, founded in 2004.

== History ==
The company was founded in 2004 by Antoine Flamarion and Mathieu Chabran.

In 2013, Tikehau Capital Partners (TCP) acquired a 35% stake in Duke Street Capital.

In 2017, François Fillon, a former French minister, was recruited as a Senior Advisor and member of the International Advisory Board. The same year, the company was listed on the Paris stock exchange.

In 2019, Tikehau Capital acquired the real estate crowdfunding platform Homunity.

In 2021, the group participated, alongside Financière Agache and banker Jean-Pierre Mustier, in the creation of a SPAC called Pegasus, dedicated to carrying out acquisitions in the financial services sector.

In February 2024, the management announced that the company had exceeded €40 billion in assets under management. In July 2024, in order to "reduce its financial debt", the Casino Group is set to sell real estate assets worth at least €200 million to Tikehau Capital.

In November 2025, Mediapart reported that the company was under investigation following the controversial acquisition of a military company. Also in November 2025, Temasek, a Singapore sovereign wealth fund, sold its stake in Tikehau Capital.

In 2026, Tikehau recorded €53.5 billion in assets under management. The same year, the company announced the acquisition of the French drone specialist Delair.

== Offices ==
Tikehau opened offices in London in 2013, followed by an office in Singapore in 2014, then in Brussels in 2015, Milan, Seoul in 2017, then New York in 2018, and then in Tokyo, Luxembourg and Amsterdam.
