= Cover FX =

American cosmetics company

- Industry: Cosmetics
- Founded: 1999
- Founders: Victor Casale; Lee Graff
- Owners: AS Beauty
- Website: https://www.coverfx.com/

Cover FX is an American cosmetics company headquartered in New York.

== Company history ==
Cover FX was founded in 1999 by chemist Victor Casale and Lee Graff in a Toronto clinic to create cosmetics specializing in skin issues and sensitivities. The line was first sold in 2002 solely through referral by dermatologists. After the company and a client of theirs who had suffered from rosacea were profiled on Citytv, the media and social exposure led them to sell their line in retail stores, initially through Canadian drug store chain Shoppers Drug Mart, before chains in the UK, US, Hong Kong, and Australia.

The company was acquired by L Catterton in 2011, which sold the company to AS Beauty in 2022.

In January 2026, Cover FX announced it would wind down operations, citing mounting industry pressures and a challenging global market.

== Lines ==
In the 2010s Cover FX was picked up by social media influencers, after which it began releasing new products. In 2016 the company began producing highlighters, and in 2017 they added a line of shimmer products called Glitter Drops as well as a sealing spray. In 2018 the company released the Power Play Foundation, a forty color line of semi-matte foundation for oily skin types, as well as a concealer. The company also runs a shade matcher on its website for those looking to match colors to their skin shade. In 2020, it added a virtual try-on aspect to its website. Then, in 2021 the company released a skin moisturizer, as a part of a new skin care line. In 2024 Cover FX partnered with Paris Jackson for the 2024 Grammy Awards, where Jackson used the company's Total Cover Cream Foundation to cover-up the tattoos on her arms during the event. The company then partnered on the same product with several TikTok content creators in February.
