= Michael Chu (private equity investor) =

American private equity executive

J. Michael Chu
- Born: James Michael Chu; July 5, 1958 (age 68)
- Education: Bates College (BA)
- Occupation: Private equity executive
- Title: Global Co-CEO, L Catterton
- Spouse: Elizabeth Kalperis Chu

James Michael Chu (born July 5, 1958) is an American financial businessman. He has been the private equity manager and co-chief executive officer (CEO) of L Catterton since 1989.

== Early life ==
Chu graduated from Bates College in Lewiston, Maine in 1980, earning a bachelor's degree in psychology and economics with highest honours. At Bates, he was a member of the board of trustees from 1995 to 2013.

== Career ==
Chu held various senior financial management positions with The First Pacific Company, a Hong Kong publicly listed investment and management company which he joined in early 1983.

=== L Caterton ===
In 1989, Chu co-founded what would later become L Catterton and subsequently served as one of the firm's Global Co-CEOs.

In 2015, Catterton Partners took on as minor partners Moët Hennessy Louis Vuitton (LVMH) and Groupe Arnault (the family office of Bernard Arnault, bringing together $12 billion in assets as L Catterton. In May 2018, his firm was listed as the 31st largest private equity firm in the world, based on capital raised over the prior five years. In June 2022, L Catterton were ranked 30th in Private Equity International's 2022 PEI 300 ranking.

=== Other memberships and philanthropy ===
Chu is a member of the Committee of 100 (a Chinese-American leadership and philanthropic organization).

In 2016, Chu and his wife made a $10 million gift to Bates College, supporting the creation of a professorship and other initiatives at the institution.

== Personal life ==
Chu is married to Elizabeth Kalperis Chu. They met while studying at Bates College. Their oldest son, Christopher, is a 2012 graduate of the college.
