= Betclic =

Online betting company

- Industry: Online gambling
- Founded: 2005; 21 years ago
- Founder: Nicolas Béraud; Eric Moncada
- Headquarters: 117 Quai de Bacalan, Bordeaux, France
- Key people: Stéphane Courbit and SBM
- Parent: Betclic Everest Group
- Website: betclic.fr

Betclic is a French online gambling company founded by Eric Moncada and Nicolas Béraud in 2005 that offers sports betting, online casino, and online poker. The business is divided into two divisions: France and International. French operations are headquartered in Bordeaux, while their International business operates from Malta.

== History ==
Betclic was created in London by Eric Moncada and Nicolas Béraud in 2005 with a single employee and an investment of 3 million euros. In 2008 Mangas Gaming bought a 75% share of Betclic from its owner for 50 million euros, with SBM buying a 50% share in the company the following year in 2009. In 2010 it was announced that Betclic held 35–40% of the market share in France, being the largest betting company in the country, holding 36% of the market in 2013. During Euro 2012, Betclic saw 2 million bets being placed over the sporting competition, seeing a profit made over that time of 12 million euros. On 31 May 2016, Betclic merged with online poker company, Everest Poker. In October 2016, they moved their London and Paris offices to Bordeaux. In September 2018, Betclic acquired a licence to operate in Poland.

In 2019, the Betclic Group withdrew from the UK online gambling market due to "low performance".

In 2025, Betclic exited the Italian market with Betsson acquiring its local subsidiary and license in the country.

== Sports sponsorships ==
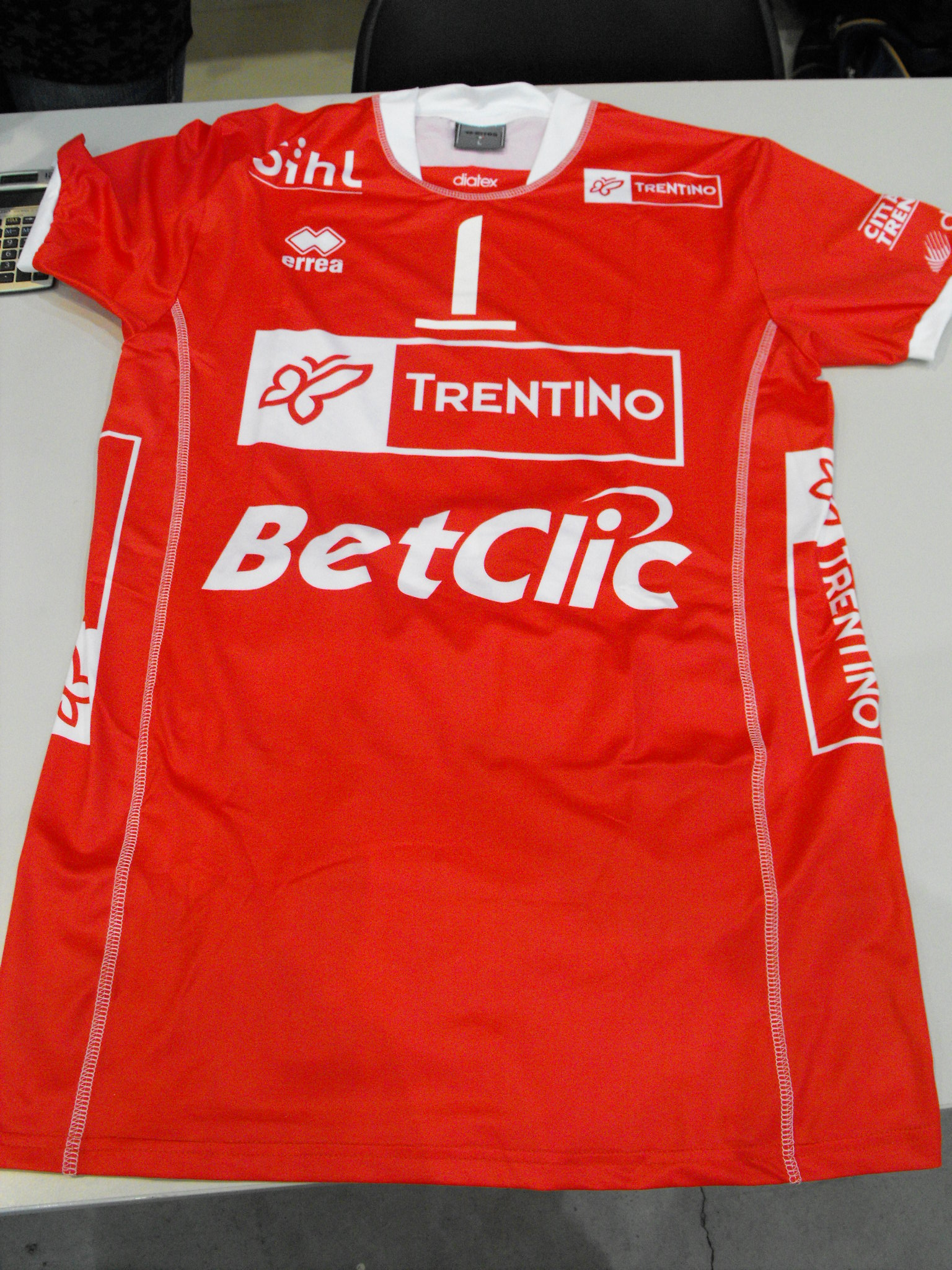
A Maglia Trentino volleyball jersey with Betclic sponsorship on

Betclic's first sporting sponsorship was with Olympique Lyonnais in 2009, appearing in the shirts for the 2010–11 season. From 2010 to 2012, Betclic was the shirt sponsor for both Olympique de Marseille and Juventus. In 2018 they announced a partnership with rugby club Union Bordeaux Bègles. With the new licence to operate in Poland obtained in 2018, Betclic announced shirt sponsorship deals with Polish football champions Piast Gliwice and Polish Cup winners Lechia Gdańsk in the summer of 2019. The Piast sponsorship was to appear on the front of the shirt, with the Lechia sponsorship to appear beneath the player numbers on the back of the shirt.

In 2019, Betclic signed a shirt sponsorship deal with the French Volleyball Federation (FFVolley) ahead of the 2019 European Volleyball Championship.

In 2020, the Ligue de Football Professionnel announced that it would be partnering with Betclic for the 2020/2021 and following three seasons. As part of the partnership Betclic are to become the official sports betting platform for Ligue 1 Uber Eats and Ligue 2 BKT.

In April 2021, Betclic was announced as the official sports betting partner of French rugby union's Top 14 league. Betclic secured a three-season deal set to run until 2024.

In June 2021, Betclic signed a three-season deal with the Ligue national de basket (LNB). The French men's first division championship will be named the "Betclic Élite" as part of the sponsorship. The sponsorship was extended to the Portuguese women's basketball league in October 2021.

In August 2021, it was reported that Betclic had signed a deal with the French Football Federation (FFF) that would see the company named as an official partner. The five-year deal covers the French football seasons until the 2026 World Cup and is estimated to be worth between €5 million and €8 million.

From the 2023-24 season, Betclic will be the presenting sponsor of the Portuguese Primeira Liga, which will be known as Liga Portugal Betclic.

== Partnerships ==
In October 2019, Betclic announced a partnership deal with online casino games supplier EFT interactive. This deal was to supply consumers within the Portuguese, Swedish and .com regulated markets with EGT premium titles through Betclic.

In August 2021, Betclic announced a deal with TVBET that will initially see two TVBET games available to Betclic customers.
