= Tipico =

Sports betting and casino game provider

Tipico Co. Ltd.
- Industry: Gambling
- Founded: 2004
- Headquarters: Tipico Tower, St. Julian's, Malta
- Key people: Axel Hefer, CEO
- Products: Sports betting, casino, games
- Number of employees: 6,000
- Website: tipico.com

Tipico Co. Ltd. is an international provider of sports betting and casino games, headquartered in St. Julian's, Malta. Tipico holds, among other licenses, a German sports betting concession from the Darmstadt Regional Council as well as other gambling licenses from the Malta Gaming Authority. The company also has branches in Germany, Austria, Croatia, Gibraltar, Colombia and the US. More than 1,800 people work for Tipico Group, with more than 6,000 in the whole franchise network. The CEO of Tipico is Axel Hefer.

== Company ==
Tipico Co. Ltd. and Tipico Casino Ltd. were founded in Malta in 2004 by Dieter Pawlik, Oliver Voigt and Mladen Pavlovic. The company group employs more than 1,800 people from 57 different nations and more than 6,000 in the whole Franchise network. In addition to the online business, Tipico operates as franchise system in Germany and Austria more than 1,250 sports betting shops. They also have offices in the US, Croatia, and Gibraltar. Tipico is the market leader in Germany with a market share of over 50 percent and is the sixth largest betting provider in the world. Tipico is one of seven companies, which, according to the Schleswig-Holstein Ministry of the Interior, has been granted a license for sports betting on the first time.

Since 2016 Tipico has a new majority shareholder with the financing company CVC Capital Partners. In the course of the sale, a new CEO was also appointed with the Austrian Joachim Baca. On 9 October 2020, Tipico was granted a German sports betting concession by the Darmstadt Regional Council as part of the very first concession grant.

In June 2024, Tipico sold its product and technology platform representing its U.S sportsbook and online casino to LeoVegas, a subsidiary of MGM Resorts International.

In October 2025, the company accepted a sale to Banijay Gaming, a division of the Banijay Group, for $5.4 billion from CVC Capital Partners. The deal was completed on 23 April 2026.

== Sponsorship ==
In Germany, Tipico was a sponsor of the football league club Hamburger SV. In addition, Tipico has a partnership with the Austrian Bundesliga. Starting from the 2015/16 season there is also a sponsoring partnership with FC Bayern Munich. Since January 2018, Tipico is official partner of the German Football League (DFL). Including the 2020/21 season, Tipico may use the symbols of the Bundesliga and 2. Bundesliga in their communication. It extended its contract with Bundesliga in 2025.

== Brand ambassador ==
Oliver Kahn has been a spokesperson for Tipico since 2013 and has been advertising with the slogan "Your bet in safe hands" for the company. Since the second half of the 2019–20 season, the betting provider has adopted the slogan Tipico - Das Original.

== Player protection ==
According to Tipico, security and player protection are part of the product promise. The provider focuses on the early identification of risky gaming behavior based on scientific models. Derived from this, targeted interventions allow Tipico to offer each customer the level of protection she or he needs to enjoy the respective offers safely. The betting provider has a full-time customer service team, customer protection team and cooperates with external partners from science and the aid and consulting sectors. These include the gambler clinic of the IAP TU Dresden, the Department of Addiction Research at the University of Lucerne, the Gambling Addiction Aid, the online advice center Gambling Therapy and the Glücksfall e.V. association.

Tipico states that it supports the Early Warning System (EWS) of the International Federation of Association Football (FIFA) and informs associations and organisers whenever the company registers suspicious betting activities. In addition, the company cooperates with the integrity department of Sportradar, with Betgenius, with the International Olympic Committee and with the Tennis Integrity Unit of the International Tennis Federation.

== Legal Issues ==
Tipico, alongside, Entain, Flutter Entertainment, and other gambling organisations, are currently facing major consumer claims in Germany. Lawyers claim that tens of thousands of gamblers are due a return of their losses because these betting operators were operating in Germany without a license. The EU Reporter estimates damages could reach around 1 billion Euros.

The gambling companies claim that they were eligible to operate across continental Europe due to their Maltese license, but the German courts have sided with the claimants. As a result, the case will now move up to the European Court of Justice.
