= Bet-at-home.com =

European online gambling and sports betting company

bet-at-home.com AG
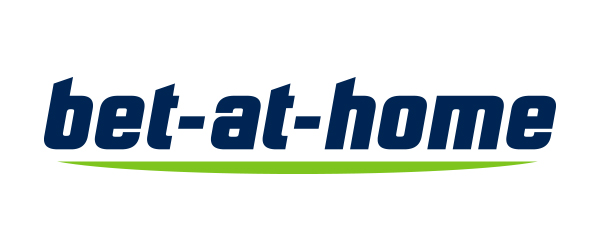
- Type: Joint Stock Corporation
- Industry: Online Sports betting and Gaming
- Founded: 1999 in Wels (Austria), AG (2004)
- Headquarters: Düsseldorf (Germany)
- Key people: Stefan Sulzbacher (CEO)
- Revenue: €48.0 million (as of December 2025)
- Number of employees: 100 (approximate)
- Website: www.bet-at-home.com

bet-at-home.com AG is a European online gambling and sports betting company that was founded in 1999.

== Corporate history ==
bet-at-home.com was founded in December 1999, in Wels Upper Austria, by Jochen Dickinger and Franz Ömer. In March 2000 www.bet-at-home.com went online. Initially the business focused its activities solely on online sports betting. Two months after the website was launched, the Livescore service, www.livescore.cc, was launched and this led to the relaunch of the bet-at-home.com website in 2002. With the start of the new online casino in November 2005, the website was again redesigned. In the following year (2006), bet-at-home.com launched its poker platform. In 2008, the product range broadened with the relaunch of a new online casino. A short while later, in June 2009, bet-at-home.com launched their new product line Games. Since September of the same year, live betting has been offered on various sporting events. Founded in 1999 as a limited company, in May 2004 the capital investments increased and bet-at-home.com transformed into a joint stock corporation. In December of the same year, the corporation was listed on the stock exchange.

Further capital increases in subsequent years followed. Between 2006 and 2009 the corporation held a 60-percent share of Racebets GmbH. bet-at-home.com AG is a part of the "BetClic Everest SAS Group", which is one of the leading French companies in the industry of online gaming and sports betting and that acquired the majority vote in April 2009. bet-at-home.com AG’s shares are listed on the Stock Exchange in Frankfurt, Xetra. In 2012 there was a change from the Open Market to the Entry Standard of the Frankfurt Stock Exchange.

On 31 October 2012 co-founder Jochen Dickinger gave up his position as CEO and was succeeded by Michael Quatember. In August 2013 the new website went online; the second relaunch in the company’s history on the offers at www.bet-at-home.com. In December 2013 a mobile version of the site was launched. In 2015 the company extended its product range by Virtual. The company was approved for the Regulated Market on the Frankfurt Stock Exchange in August 2016. Admission to the "Prime Standard" segment was granted. On 3 February 2017, the shares were admitted to the SDAX. In February 2017, casino games were added to the poker software. In November 2017, the product group "Games" was replaced by "Vegas" and the casino app was introduced. In June 2018, the Sports app was introduced. With the launch of the esports channel in September 2018 the company added a new product.

In October 2021, the online casino, which was offered to customers in Austria by bet-at-home.com Entertainment Ltd. (in liquidation) (the group company whose main operation at that time was the running of the online casino), was discontinued. Due to a lack of positive forecasts for continued business, court proceedings (winding up by the court) were initiated on 23 December 2021 against this Maltese entity. On May 13, 2022, bet-at-home.com Entertainment Ltd. (in liquidation) was deconsolidated from the consolidated financial statements of the Group.

Marco Falchetto has been appointed member of the board of the bet-at-home.com AG with effect from 21 February 2022. Franz Ömer and Michael Quatember left the board at their own request at the regular end of their appointment in late February 2022. With effect from 31 May 2025 Marco Falchetto resigned from office as a member of the management board. Claus Retschitzegger was appointed as his successor. On 20 April 2026, the supervisory board appointed Stefan Sulzbacher as CEO.

On 7 July 2022, the Gambling Commission revoked bet-at-home.com's gambling license in the United Kingdom, citing lack of responsible gaming measures, and Anti-Money Laundering procedure.

In the fourth quarter 2022, the Group was granted a virtual slot machine license in Germany. The sports betting license in Germany, which expired at the end of 2022, was reissued with a validity period until the end of 2027.

== Corporate structure ==
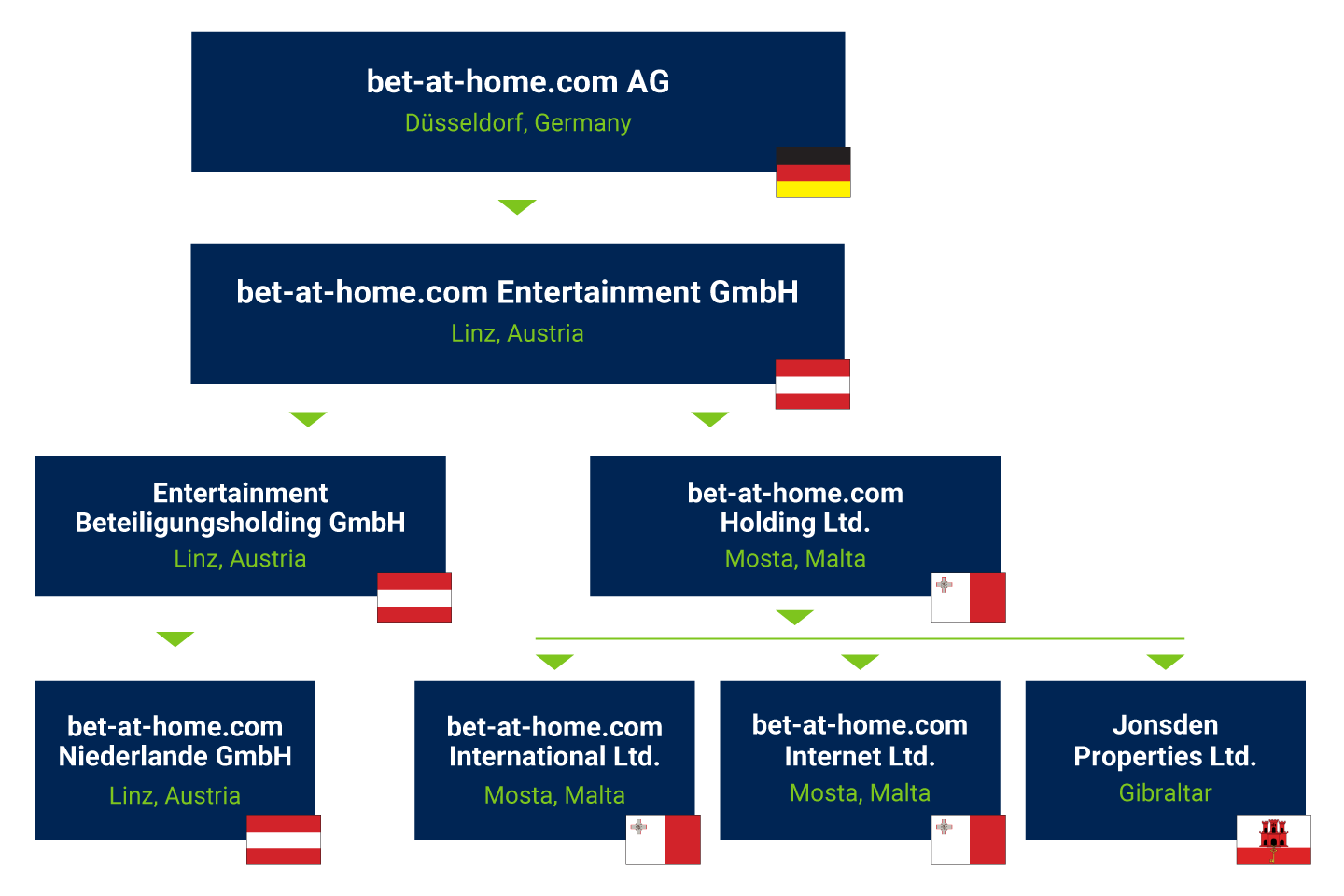
Corporate structure of bet-at-home.com

bet-at-home.com AG, Düsseldorf, as the parent company, is listed on the Regulated Market of the Frankfurt Stock Exchange in the Prime Standard market segment. The company holds 100% of bet-at-home.com Entertainment GmbH. This company, with its registered office in Linz, Austria, provides numerous services in the areas of IT, finance, customer management and law for other Group companies. The company’s international licences for online sports betting as well as its online gaming licences for casino and games are held by bet-at-home.com Holding Ltd. based in Mosta, Malta.
