= Financière Agache =

Family office of the Arnaults

Financière Agache SA
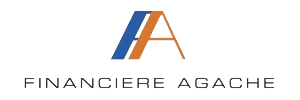
- Type: Private
- Industry: Holding company
- Predecessor: Agache-Willot-Boussac
- Founded: 1984; 42 years ago
- Headquarters: Paris, France
- Key people: Florian Ollivier (chairman & CEO); Frédéric Arnault (managing director)
- Revenue: ▲€86.17 billion (2023)
- Operating income: ▲€22.53 billion (2023)
- Net income: ▲€15.85 billion (2023)
- Total assets: ▲€147.81 billion (2023)
- Total equity: ▲€65.59 billion (2023)
- Owner: Bernard Arnault and family
- Number of employees: 213,268 (2023)
- Parent: Agache SCA
- Subsidiaries: Dior; LVMH; Aglaé Ventures
- Website: www.financiereagache-finance.com

Financière Agache SA is an investment holding company based in Paris that is the controlling shareholder of Dior and LVMH. It is controlled by Agache SCA, a company owned by Bernard Arnault and his family.

Financière Agache acts as a family office for the Arnault family and also holds a portfolio of diversified financial investments.

== History ==
The origins of Financière Agache can be traced back to Agache-Willot-Boussac, a French group that dealt in retailing, fashion and manufacturing. Formed from a series of mergers and acquisitions, it owned assets such as Dior, Conforama and Le Bon Marché. It was close to bankruptcy in the early 1980s.

In 1984, Bernard Arnault, then a young real estate developer had just returned to France from the United States and had heard that the French government was set to choose someone to take over Agache-Willot-Boussac. During his time in New York, Arnault was neighbour to John Kluge who made billions by taking his company Metromedia private and then liquidating it and had also watched the success KKR had with its leveraged buyouts. Arnault won the bidding war for Agache-Willot-Boussac using his family's money as well as backing by Lazard. It was then renamed to Financière Agache.

Financière Agache underwent significant restructuring. Arnault acquired the nickname 'The Terminator' after he laid off 9,000 workers in two years and sold most of the group's assets, with the exception of Dior.

Using the profits from selling assets, Arnault helped bring Louis Vuitton and Moët Hennessy together to form LVMH. In 1989, using Lazard's help once more (which held 10% in Financière Agache at the time), Arnault and Financière Agache were able to gain full control over LVMH.

Using Financière Agache as a platform, Arnault led an aggressive expansion to create the world's biggest luxury conglomerate. Financière Agache owns 96% of family holding company Christian Dior, which holds 42% of LVMH. Brands acquired included Loewe, Sephora, Marc Jacobs, and Celine. Financière Agache also funded Christian Lacroix.

Financière Agache was controlled by Groupe Arnault, a company owned by Arnault. In December 2020, Groupe Arnault changed it name to Agache.

In July 2022, Arnault changed the legal structure of Agache from a Societas Europaea to a joint-stock partnership to ensure family control over LVMH in the long term.

== Managing directors ==
- 1999–2024: Nicolas Bazire
- 2024–present: Frédéric Arnault

== Investment operations ==
Financière Agache issues bonds for financing and acquisition purposes.

Since the 1990s, Arnault has invested in technology companies through his family office. These include Devialet, Netflix, Spotify and Airbnb.

In 2007, Financière Agache first took a 9.8% holding in France's supermarket group Carrefour, alongside Colony Capital and Axon Capital. During that time, it emerged as one of Carrefour's three big shareholders, along with the Motier Holding and Península Participações. Between 2020 and 2021, it sold its entire stake for €724 million after a potential takeover by Couche-Tard did not materialize.

In January 2016, Catterton, LVMH, and Financière Agache partnered to create private equity firm L Catterton. Notable investment include Birkenstock, Jio Platforms and Norwegian Cruise Line Holdings.

In 2017, Aglaé Ventures was established as a venture capital firm under Financière Agache. It was initially set up to invest up to €2 million at a time in France technology companies, as well as helping them to expand internationally.

In May 2020, Financière Agache acquired 27% stake in Lagardère Capital, the personal holding company of Arnaud Lagardère; Arnault had initially invested to help Arnaud Lagardère fight off an activist fund, but he ended up sidelined after Vincent Bolloré ended up becoming Lagardère's lead shareholder. In September 2021, Financière Agache sold its entire stake for a 9.97% stake in Lagardère Group.

In April 2021, Financière Agache co-sponsored a SPAC named Pegasus Europe which raised €483 million. However a target could not be found and it was terminated in April 2023. In December 2021, Financière Agache and its partners publicly listed a second SPAC with an entrepreneurial focus, Pegasus Entrepreneurial Acquisition Company Europe, in Amsterdam; it raised 200 million euros ($226 million). It later backed Pegasus Asia in 2022 which raised S$170 million ($126 million) with plans to invest in tech-enabled sectors.
